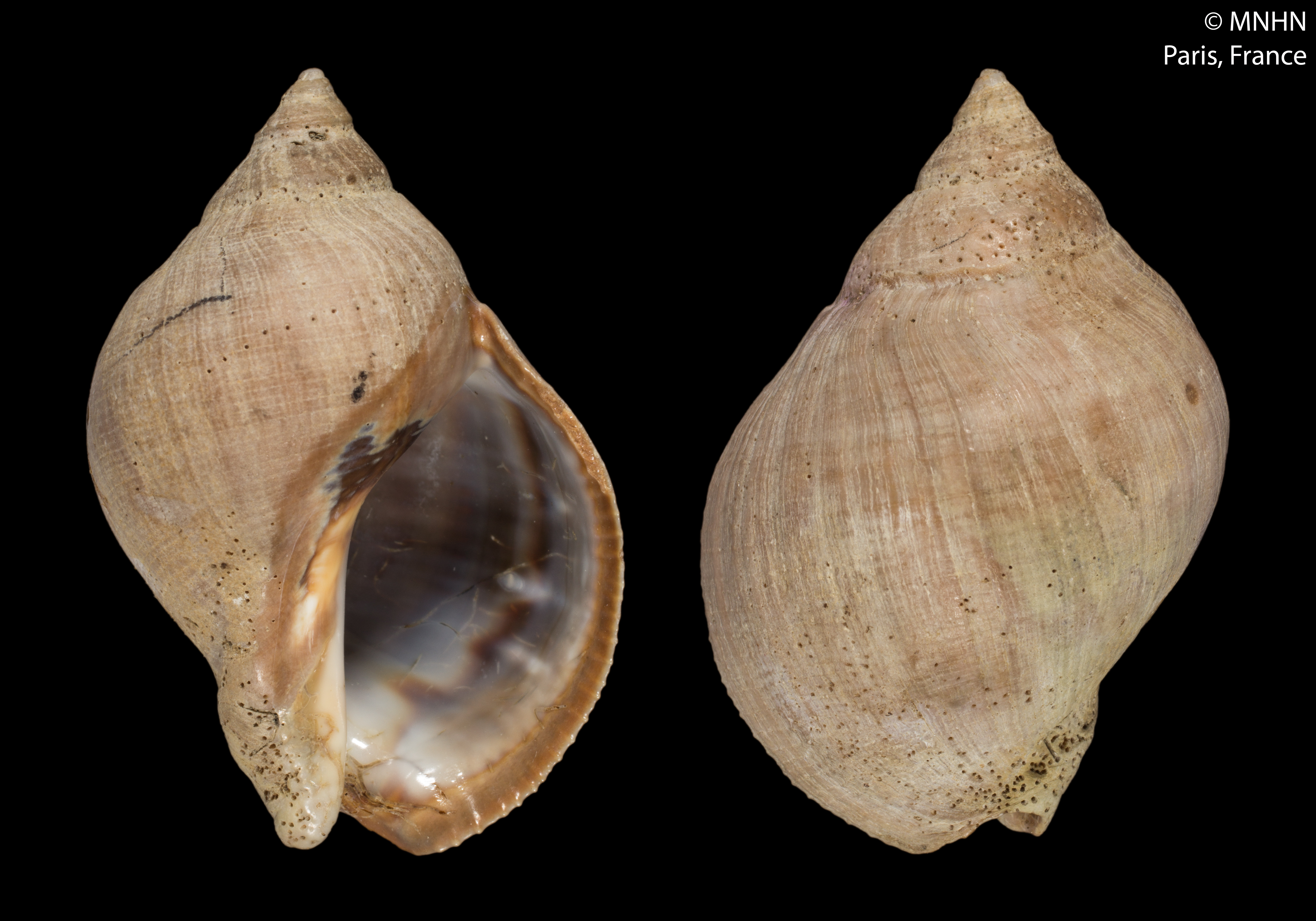
- Thaisella chocolata

Scientific classification
- Kingdom: Animalia
- Phylum: Mollusca
- Class: Gastropoda
- Subclass: Caenogastropoda
- Order: Neogastropoda
- Superfamily: Muricoidea
- Family: Muricidae
- Subfamily: Rapaninae
- Genus: Thaisella; Clench, 1947

Synonyms
- Thais (Thaisella) Clench, 1947

= Thaisella =

Genus of gastropods

Thaisella is a genus of sea snails, marine gastropod mollusks, in the family Muricidae, the murex snails or rock snails.

== Species ==
Species within the genus Thaisella include:

- Thaisella callifera (Lamarck, 1822)
- Thaisella chocolata (Duclos, 1832)
- Thaisella coronata (Lamarck, 1816)
- Thaisella forbesii (Dunker, 1853)
- Thaisella guatemalteca Simone, 2017
- Thaisella kiosquiformis (Duclos, 1832)
- Thaisella mariae (Morretes, 1954)
- Thaisella trinitatensis (Guppy, 1869)
- Thaisella tumulosa (Reeve, 1846)

The following species were brought into synonymy:'

- Thaisella blanfordi (Melvill, 1893): synonym of Indothais blanfordi (Melvill, 1893)
- Thaisella dubia (Schepman, 1919): synonym of Indothais dubia (Schepman, 1919)
- Thaisella gradata (Jonas, 1846): synonym of Indothais gradata (Jonas, 1846)
- Thaisella javanica (Philippi, 1848): synonym of Indothais javanica (Philippi, 1848)
- Thaisella jubilaea (Tan & Sigurdsson, 1990): synonym of Reishia jubilaea (K. S. Tan & Sigurdsson, 1990) synonym of Reishia luteostoma (Holten, 1802) (superseded combination)
- Thaisella keluo (Tan & Liu, 2001): synonym of Reishia keluo (K.-S. Tan & L.-L. Liu, 2001)
- Thaisella lacera (Born, 1778): synonym of Indothais lacera (Born, 1778)
- Thaisella luteostoma (Holten, 1803): synonym of Reishia luteostoma (Holten, 1802)
- Thaisella malayensis (Tan & Sigurdsson, 1996): synonym of Indothais malayensis (K. S. Tan & Sigurdsson, 1996) (superseded combination)
- Thaisella mutabilis (Link, 1807): synonym of Indothais lacera (Born, 1778)
- Thaisella pinangensis (Tan & Sigurdsson, 1996): synonym of Indothais pinangensis (K. S. Tan & Sigurdsson, 1996)
- Thaisella rufotincta (Tan & Sigurdsson, 1996): synonym of Indothais pinangensis (K. S. Tan & Sigurdsson, 1996)
- Thaisella sacellum (Gmelin, 1791): synonym of Indothais sacellum (Gmelin, 1791)
- Thaisella tissoti (Petit de la Saussaye, 1852): synonym of Indothais sacellum (Gmelin, 1791)
- Thaisella wutingi (Tan, 1997): synonym of Indothais wutingi (K. S. Tan, 1997)
