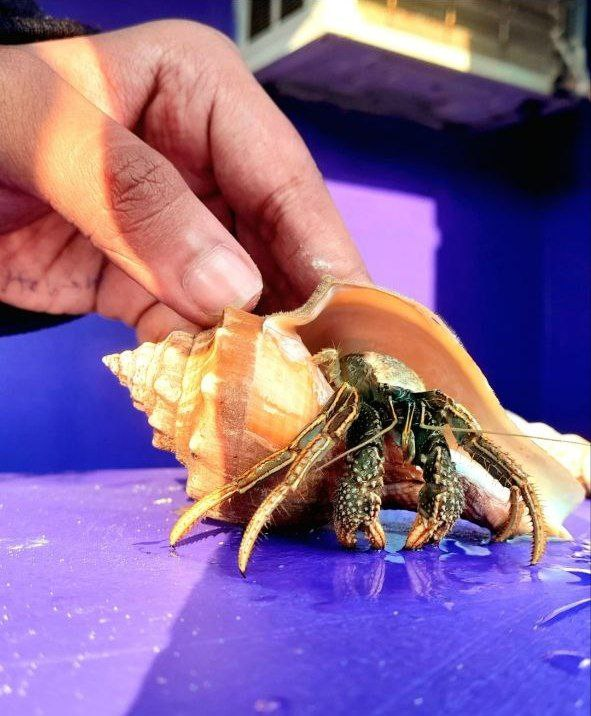
- Clibanarius infraspinatus specimen at Talsari , Odisha within the shell of Volegalea cochlidium

Scientific classification
- Kingdom: Animalia
- Phylum: Arthropoda
- Clade: Pancrustacea
- Class: Malacostraca
- Order: Decapoda
- Suborder: Pleocyemata
- Infraorder: Anomura
- Family: Diogenidae
- Genus: Clibanarius
- Species: C. infraspinatus

Binomial name
- Clibanarius infraspinatus (Hilgendorf, 1869)

Synonyms
- Pagurus (Clibanarius) infraspinatus Hilgendorf, 1869

= Clibanarius infraspinatus =

Species of crab

Clibanarius infraspinatus is a species of hermit crab of the family Diogenidae.

== Range ==
Widely distributed across the Indo Pacific region.

== Shell utilization pattern ==
List of gastropod shells used by the hermit crab species Clibanarius infraspinatus

- Bursa granularis
- Calliostoma tranquebaricum
- Cantharus spiralis
- Cerithium scabridum
- Indothais lacera
- Nassarius stolatus
- Nerita oryzarum
- Tectus niloticus
- Trochus cariniferus
- Nerita articulata
- Cerithidea obtusa
- Cerithidea cingulated
- Telescopium telescopium
- Polinices mamilla
- Polinices didyma
- Natica tigrina
- Natica vitellus
- Tonna dolium
- Gyrineum natator
- Bufonaria rana
- Thais blanfordi
- Nassarius stolatus
- Nassarius foveolatus
- Pugilina cochlidium
- Turricula javana
- Architectonica laevigata
