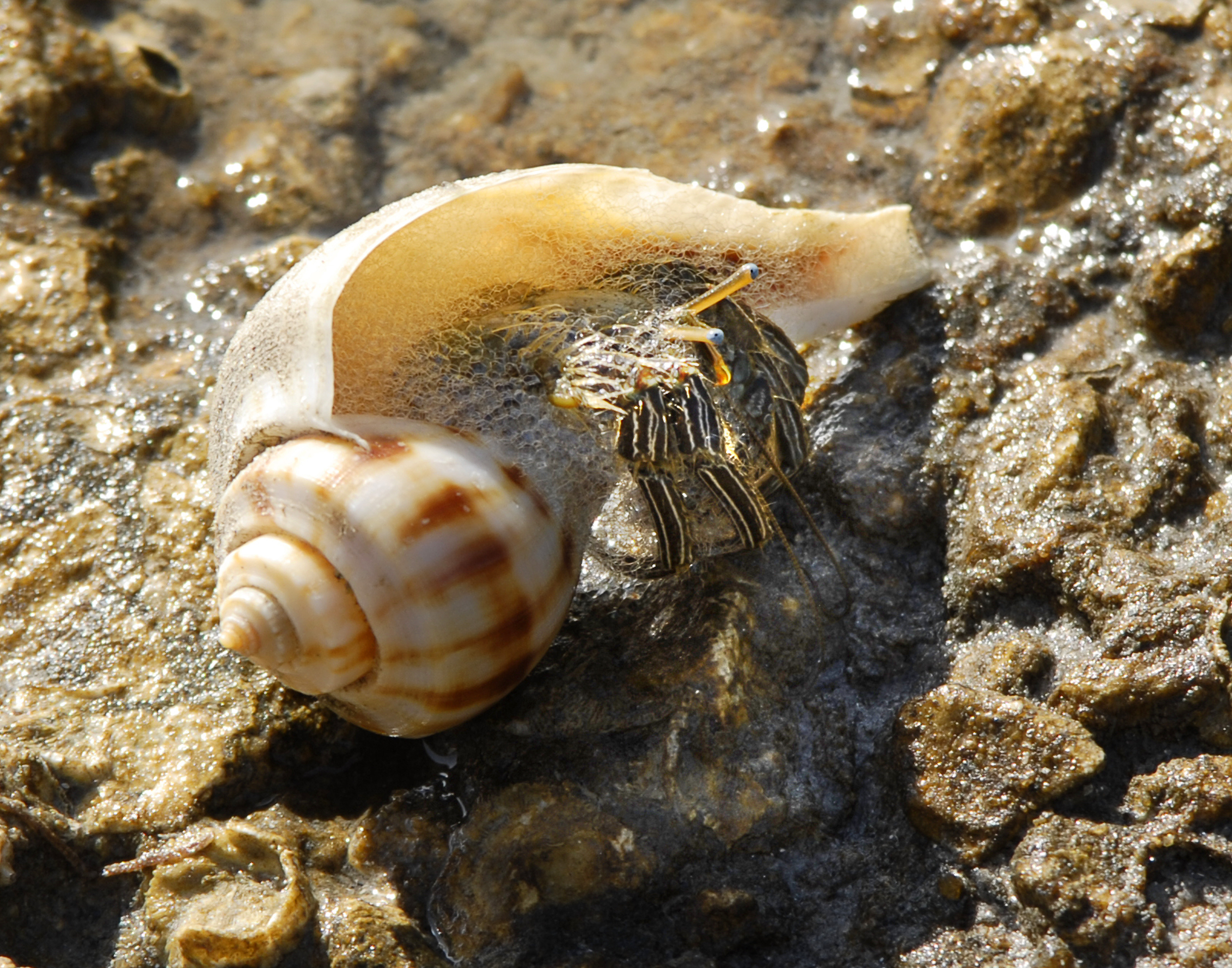

Scientific classification
- Kingdom: Animalia
- Phylum: Arthropoda
- Clade: Pancrustacea
- Class: Malacostraca
- Order: Decapoda
- Suborder: Pleocyemata
- Infraorder: Anomura
- Family: Diogenidae
- Genus: Clibanarius
- Species: C. vittatus

Binomial name
- Clibanarius vittatus (Bosc, 1802)

Synonyms
- Clibanarius cayennensis Miers, 1877; Clibanarius speciosus Miers, 1877; Pagurus symmetricius Randall, 1840; Pagurus vittatus Bosc, 1802

= Thinstripe hermit crab =

Clibanarius vittatus

Species of crustacean

The thinstripe hermit crab, Clibanarius vittatus, is a species of hermit crab in the family Diogenidae. It is found in the Caribbean Sea, the Gulf of Mexico and the western Atlantic Ocean.

== Description ==
Like other hermit crabs, Clibanarius vittatus lives inside the empty shell of a gastropod mollusc. This protects its soft abdomen and normally only its head and limbs project through the aperture of the shell. The chelipeds (claw-bearing legs) and claws of Clibanarius vittatus are small, both the same size, and covered in short bristles. When threatened, the animal retreats into the shell and the chelipeds block the aperture. The outside of the claws bear small blue tubercles. The body and legs are dark green or brown; the body is faintly streaked with white and the legs have more distinct white or grey stripes. Adult crabs often occupy shells of over 10 cm (4 in) in length.

== Distribution and habitat ==
Clibanarius vittatus is found in shallow parts of the Caribbean Sea, the Gulf of Mexico and the western Atlantic Ocean. Its range extends from Virginia in the eastern United States southwards as far as Brazil. It is plentiful in the Indian River Lagoon in Florida. It is more resistant to desiccation than many hermit crabs and is found in the intertidal zone as well as at depths down to about 22 metres (72 ft). It can be found on sand or mud, in seagrass meadows, on rock jetties, in oyster beds and in other inshore habitats.

== Biology ==
Clibanarius vittatus is a scavenger and mostly feeds on detritus that it finds on the seabed.

Reproduction in Clibanarius vittatus is initiated by the passing of spermatophores from a male crab to a female. The egg mass of several thousand eggs is brooded by the female on her abdomen. After a few weeks the eggs hatch and the larvae are released into the water column and become planktonic. They pass through four or five zoeal stages and one post-larval, glaucothoe stage before sinking to the bottom and metamorphosing into juveniles. The free-living glaucothoe larvae sometimes finds a suitable sized shell before metamorphosis; otherwise, the juveniles need to find suitable new homes before they are consumed by predators. An adult female has several broods each year and may produce 180,000 eggs during the reproductive season.

== Ecology ==
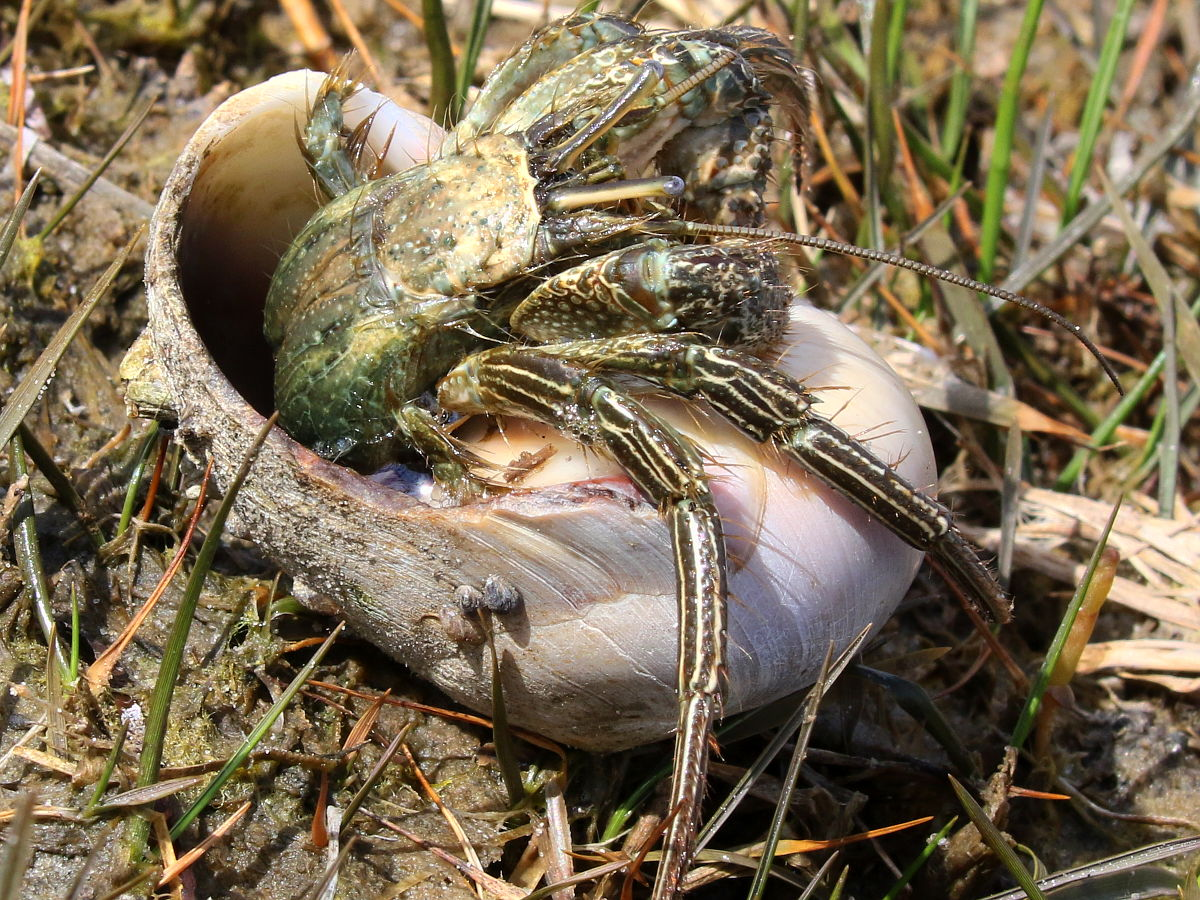
At a beach, Cape Hatteras National Seashore, NC

As it grows, Clibanarius vittatus periodically needs to change the shell in which it lives. At this stage it is at its most vulnerable to predators. If a suitable vacant shell cannot be found, crabs may fight each other for shells or even kill living molluscs. The shells chosen by Clibanarius vittatus are usually whelks or conches. Species selected include the lightning whelk (Sinistrofulgur sp.), the knobbed whelk (Busycon carica), the giant triton (Monoplex parthenopeus), the moon snail (Neverita duplicata) and the Florida rocksnail (Stramonita haemastoma).

The sea anemone, Calliactis tricolor, is often found attached to the shell that is occupied by Clibanarius vittatus. This seems to be a mutualistic arrangement in which the crab benefits from the fact that potential predators are deterred by the anemone's stinging cells while the anemone gains a greater access to food as the crab moves around.
