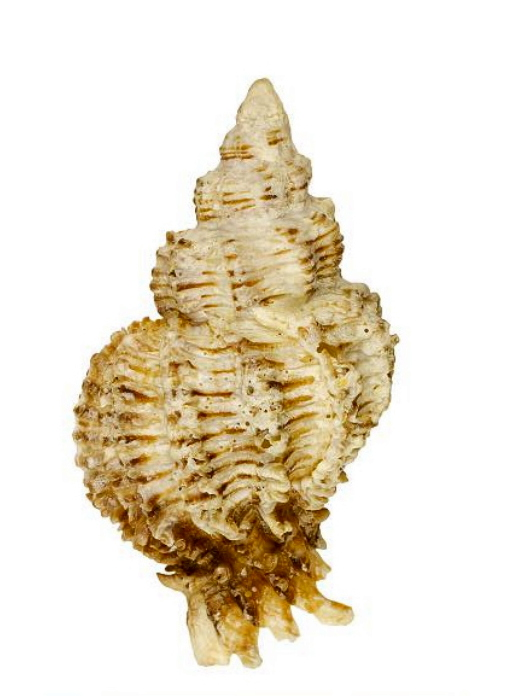
- Shell of Indothais blanfordi (specimen at the Smithsonian Institution, Washington DC

Scientific classification
- Kingdom: Animalia
- Phylum: Mollusca
- Class: Gastropoda
- Subclass: Caenogastropoda
- Order: Neogastropoda
- Superfamily: Muricoidea
- Family: Muricidae
- Subfamily: Rapaninae
- Genus: Indothais; Claremont, Vermeij, Williams & Reid, 2013

Type species
- Murex lacerus Born, 1778

= Indothais =

Genus of gastropods

Indothais is a genus of sea snails, marine gastropod mollusks, in the family Muricidae, the murex snails or rock snails.

== Species ==
Species within the genus Indothais include:

- Indothais blanfordi (Melvill, 1893)
- Indothais dubia (Schepman, 1919)
- Indothais gradata (Jonas, 1846)
- Indothais guglielmii T. Cossignani, 2019
- Indothais javanica (Philippi, 1848)
- Indothais lacera (Born, 1778)
- Indothais malayensis (Tan & Sigurdsson, 1996)
- Indothais pinangensis (K. S. Tan & Sigurdsson, 1996)
- Indothais rufotincta (K. S. Tan & Sigurdsson, 1996)
- Indothais sacellum (Gmelin, 1791)
- Indothais scalaris (Schubert & J. A. Wagner, 1829)
- Indothais wutingi (Tan, 1997)
