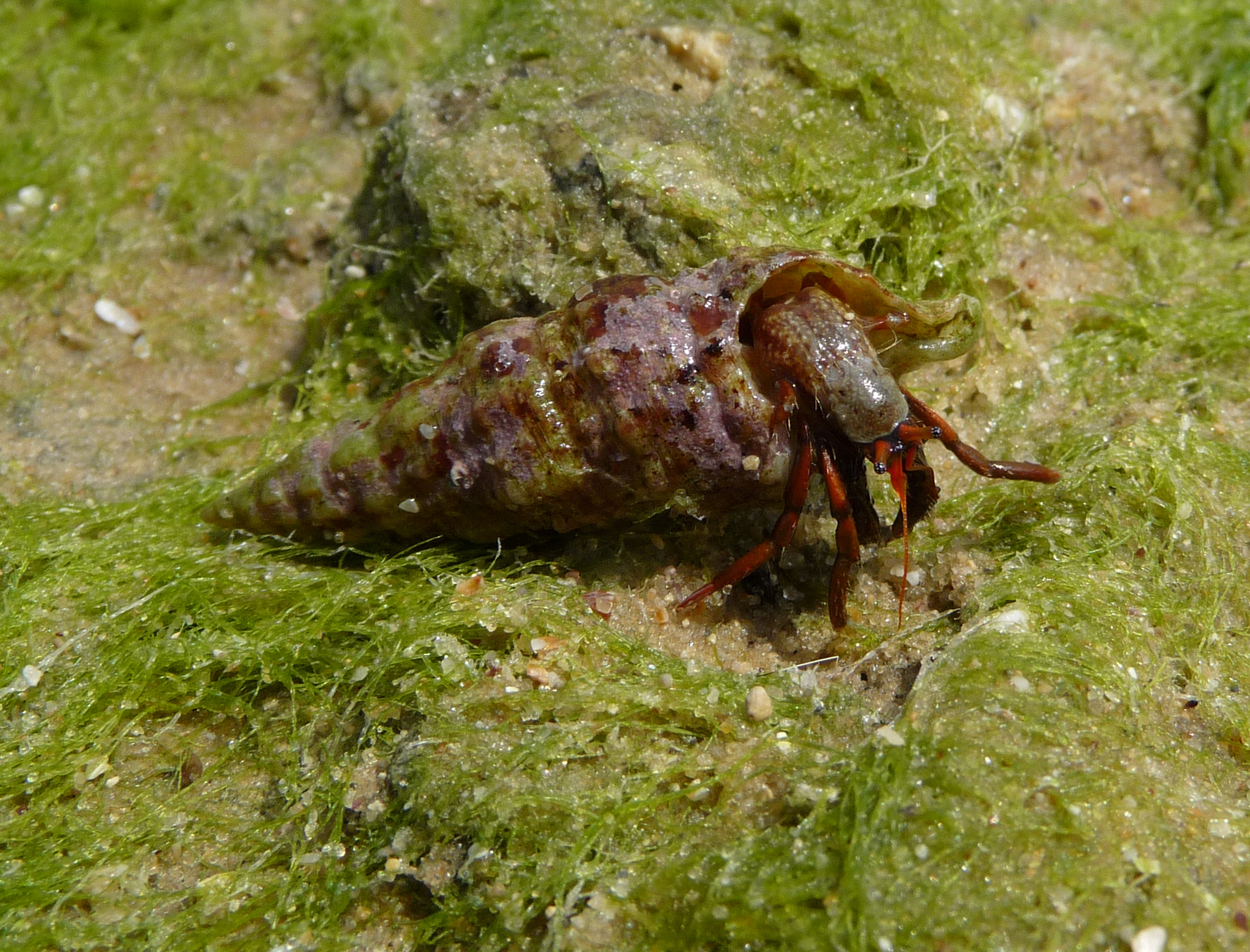
- Clibanarius erythropus

Scientific classification
- Kingdom: Animalia
- Phylum: Arthropoda
- Clade: Pancrustacea
- Class: Malacostraca
- Order: Decapoda
- Suborder: Pleocyemata
- Infraorder: Anomura
- Family: Diogenidae
- Genus: Clibanarius; Dana, 1852

Diversity
- About 60 species

= Clibanarius =

Genus of crustaceans

Clibanarius is a genus of hermit crabs in the family Diogenidae. Like other hermit crabs, their abdomen is soft-shelled and sheltered in a gastropod shell. Typically marine like all their relatives, the genus includes C. fonticola, the only known hermit crab species that spends all its life in freshwater. The feeding rates of Clibanarius species change with temperature which, given their broad distributions, may have considerable consequences for the stability reef systems as sea temperatures rise in the future.

They are omnivores, but mostly prey on small animals and scavenge carrion.

== Species ==
As of 2025, about sixty valid species are recognized in Clibanarius; new species are discovered and described occasionally. Several former members have been reassigned to other genera of Diogenidae, namely Bathynarius, Calcinus, Paguristes, Strigopagurus and Trizopagurus.

The Clibanarius species are:

- Clibanarius aequabilis (Dana, 1851)
- Clibanarius africanus Aurivillus, 1898
- Clibanarius albidigitus Nobili, 1901
- Clibanarius ambonensis Rahayu & Forest, 1993
- Clibanarius antennatus Rahayu & Forest, 1993
- Clibanarius antillensis Stimpson, 1859
- Clibanarius arethusa De Man, 1888
- Clibanarius astathes (Stebbing, 1924)
- Clibanarius bimaculatus De Haan, 1849
- Clibanarius bistriatus Rahayu & Forest, 1993
- Clibanarius boschmai Buitendijk, 1937
- Clibanarius carnifex Heller, 1861
- †Clibanarius cecconi (De Angeli & Caporiondo, 2017)
- Clibanarius chapini Schmitt, 1926
- Clibanarius clibanarius (Herbst, 1791)
- Clibanarius cooki Rathbun, 1900
- Clibanarius corallinus (H. Milne-Edwards, 1848)
- Clibanarius cruentatus (H. Milne-Edwards, 1848)
- Clibanarius danai Rahayu & Forest, 1993
- Clibanarius demani Buitendijk, 1937
- Clibanarius digueti Bouvier, 1898
- Clibanarius elongatus (H. Milne Edwards, 1848) (See below)
- Clibanarius englaucus Ball & Haig, 1972
- Clibanarius erythropus (Latreille, 1818)
- Clibanarius eurysternus (Hilgendorf, 1879)
- Clibanarius fonticola McLaughlin & Murray, 1990
- Clibanarius foresti Holthuis, 1959
- Clibanarius harisi Rahayu, 2003
- Clibanarius humilis (Dana, 1851)
- Clibanarius inaequalis (De Haan, 1849)
- Clibanarius infraspinatus (Hilgendorf, 1869)
- †Clibanarius isabenaensis (Ferratges, Artal, Van Bakel & Zamora, 2022)
- Clibanarius janethaigae Hendrickx & Esparza-Haro, 1997
- Clibanarius laevimanus Buitendijk, 1937
- Clibanarius lineatus (H. Milne-Edwards, 1848)
- Clibanarius longitarsus (De Haan, 1849)
- Clibanarius merguiensis De Man, 1888
- Clibanarius nathi Chopra & Das, 1940
- Clibanarius olivaceus Henderson, 1915
- Clibanarius pacificus Stimpson, 1858
- Clibanarius padavensis De Man, 1888
- Clibanarius ransoni Forest, 1953
- Clibanarius rhabdodactylus Forest, 1953
- Clibanarius rosewateri Manning & Chace, 1990
- Clibanarius rubroviria Rahayu, 1999
- Clibanarius rutilus Rahayu, 1999
- Clibanarius sclopetarius (Herbst, 1796)
- Clibanarius senegalensis Chevreux & Bouvier, 1892
- Clibanarius serenei Rahayu & Forest, 1993
- Clibanarius signatus Heller, 1861
- Clibanarius similis Rahayu & Forest, 1993
- †Clibanarius sossanensis (De Angeli & Caporiondo, 2009)
- Clibanarius snelliusi Buitendijk, 1937
- Clibanarius striolatus Dana, 1852
- Clibanarius symmetricus (Randall, 1840)
- Clibanarius taeniatus (H. Milne-Edwards, 1848)
- Clibanarius tricolor (Gibbes, 1850)
- Clibanarius virescens (Krauss, 1843)
- Clibanarius vittatus (Bosc, 1802)
- Clibanarius willeyi Southwell, 1910
- Clibanarius zebra Dana, 1852

Else: Clibanarius elongatus (H. Milne Edwards, 1848) is a nomen dubium.
See also:

- Clibanarius hirsutimanus Kobjakova, 1971 later Areopaguristes hirsutimanus (Kobjakova, 1971)
- Clibanarius multipunctatus Wang & Tung, 1986 later Strigopagurus boreonotus Forest, 1995
- Clibanarius sachalinicus Kobjakova, 1955 later Clibanarius virescens (Krauss, 1843)
