= Indothais scalaris =

Scientific classification
- Kingdom: Animalia
- Phylum: Mollusca
- Class: Gastropoda
- Subclass: Caenogastropoda
- Order: Neogastropoda
- Family: Muricidae
- Genus: Indothais
- Species: I. scalaris

Binomial name
- Indothais scalaris (Schubert & J. A. Wagner, 1829)

Synonyms
- Purpura scalaris Schubert & Wagner, 1829

Species of gastropod

Indothais scalaris is a species of sea snail, a marine gastropod mollusk, in the family Muricidae, the murex snails or rock snails.
