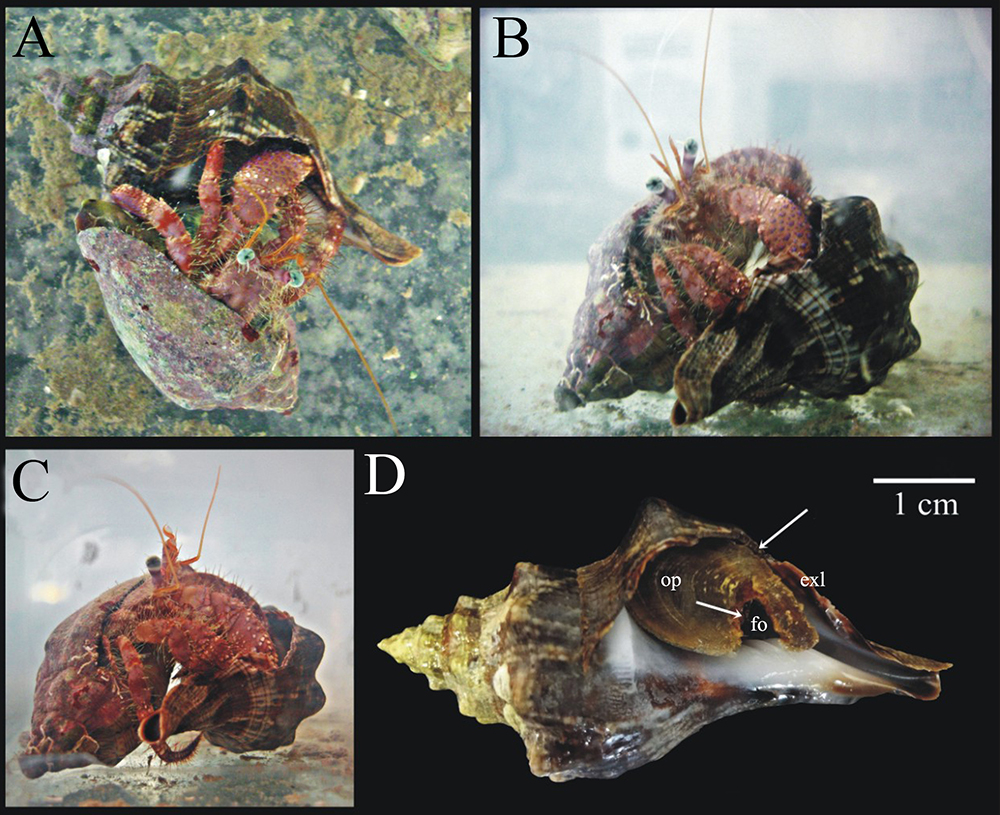
- Attacks of Dardanus venosus on Aurantilaria aurantiaca

Scientific classification
- Kingdom: Animalia
- Phylum: Arthropoda
- Clade: Pancrustacea
- Class: Malacostraca
- Order: Decapoda
- Suborder: Pleocyemata
- Infraorder: Anomura
- Family: Diogenidae
- Genus: Dardanus
- Species: D. venosus

Binomial name
- Dardanus venosus (H. Milne Edwards, 1848)

Synonyms
- Pagurus arrosor var. divergens Moreira, 1905; Pagurus venosus H. Milne Edwards, 1848

= Dardanus venosus =

Species of crustacean

Dardanus venosus, the starry-eyed crab or stareye crab, is a species of hermit crab in the family Diogenidae. It occurs in shallow water on the eastern coasts of America from Florida southward to Brazil. It is sometimes kept in reef aquaria.

== Description ==
Dardanus venosus grows to a length of 7 to 12 centimetres (2.8 to 4.7 in). As a hermit crab, it lives inside the empty shell of a gastropod mollusc and its soft abdomen and most of its limbs are normally hidden with just the dactyls, or claws, projecting. Like other members of its family, it is left-handed, having its main chela or pincers on the left front limb. It uses this to cover the aperture of the shell when it feels threatened. The dactyls are a mauve colour due to the clusters of small bluish bristles that cover them. The crab's common name refers to the fact that when seen at close quarters, its eyes resemble star-bursts, being green or blue with dark pupils.

== Distribution and habitat ==
Dardanus venosus is found in Florida, the Caribbean Sea, the Gulf of Mexico, the Bahamas, the Antilles, Venezuela and Brazil from low tide mark down to about 40 metres (130 ft). It is found on various substrates including rock, gravel, sand, mud, shell, coral and seaweed.

== Biology ==
Dardanus venosus is a scavenger and consumes detritus and anything edible that it finds on the seabed.

The life cycle of Dardanus venosus has been little studied but the eggs are probably brooded attached to the female's abdomen. When the eggs hatch, the larvae are liberated into the water column and pass through several zoeal stages in the plankton before becoming glaucothoë larvae. These are relatively large and have elongated telsons, or rear segments, and characteristic hooks on the dactyls of the walking legs. After some time, the glaucothoë larvae settle out before metamorphosing into juveniles that needs to find shells in which to live.

== Ecology ==
In a study off the coast of Brazil, Dardanus venosus was found occupying eleven different kinds of gastropod shell including three different species of turban snail, (Astraea sp).

Dardanus venosus often has the sea anemone Calliactis tricolor attached to its shell. It actively collects the anemone off a rock or removes it from an outgrown shell when it moves into a larger one. It loosens the grip of the anemone by giving it several taps near the base, causing it to relax. At first the anemone clings to the new shell with its tentacles until its base has a firm grip on the shell. This is a mutualistic arrangement with both crab and anemone deriving benefit. The crab is protected by the stinging cells of the anemone and the anemone gains transport and a greater supply of food comes within its reach.
