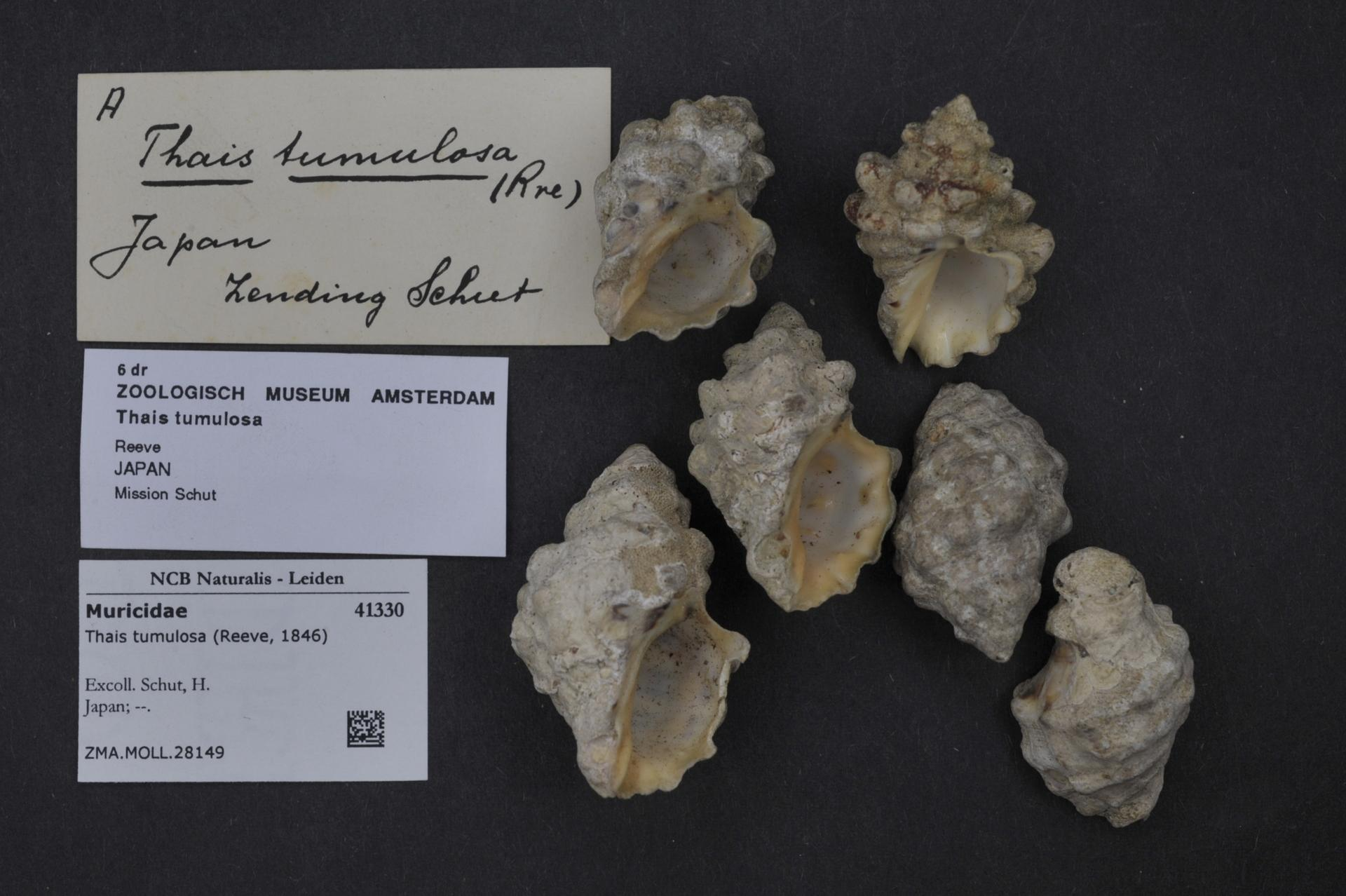
- Shell of Thaisella tumulosa (specimen at Naturalis Biodiversity Center)

Scientific classification
- Kingdom: Animalia
- Phylum: Mollusca
- Class: Gastropoda
- Subclass: Caenogastropoda
- Order: Neogastropoda
- Superfamily: Muricoidea
- Family: Muricidae
- Subfamily: Rapaninae
- Genus: Thaisella
- Species: T. tumulosa

Binomial name
- Thaisella tumulosa (Reeve, 1846)

Synonyms
- Purpura tumulosa Reeve, 1846; Thais (Thalessa) tumulosa (Reeve, 1846); Thalessa tumulosa (Reeve, 1846)

= Thaisella tumulosa =

Species of gastropod

Thaisella tumulosa is a species of sea snail, a marine gastropod mollusk, in the family Muricidae, the murex snails or rock snails.

== Distribution ==
This marine species occurs off Japan.
