= Thaisella kiosquiformis =

Scientific classification
- Kingdom: Animalia
- Phylum: Mollusca
- Class: Gastropoda
- Subclass: Caenogastropoda
- Order: Neogastropoda
- Superfamily: Muricoidea
- Family: Muricidae
- Subfamily: Rapaninae
- Genus: Thaisella
- Species: T. kiosquiformis

Binomial name
- Thaisella kiosquiformis (Duclos, 1832)

Synonyms
- Purpura kiosquiformis Duclos, 1832; Thais (Stramonita) kiosquiformis (Duclos, 1832); Thais (Thaisella) kiosquiformis (Duclos, 1832)

Species of gastropod

Thaisella kiosquiformis is a species of sea snail, a marine gastropod mollusk, in the family Muricidae, the murex snails or rock snails.

== Description ==
The length of the shell attains 37 mm.

== Distribution ==
This marine species occurs off Panama.

== Bibliography ==
- Claremont, M., Vermeij, G. J., Williams, S. T. & Reid, D. G. (2013). Global phylogeny and new classification of the Rapaninae (Gastropoda: Muricidae), dominant molluscan predators on tropical rocky seashores. Molecular Phylogenetics and Evolution. 66: 91–102.
