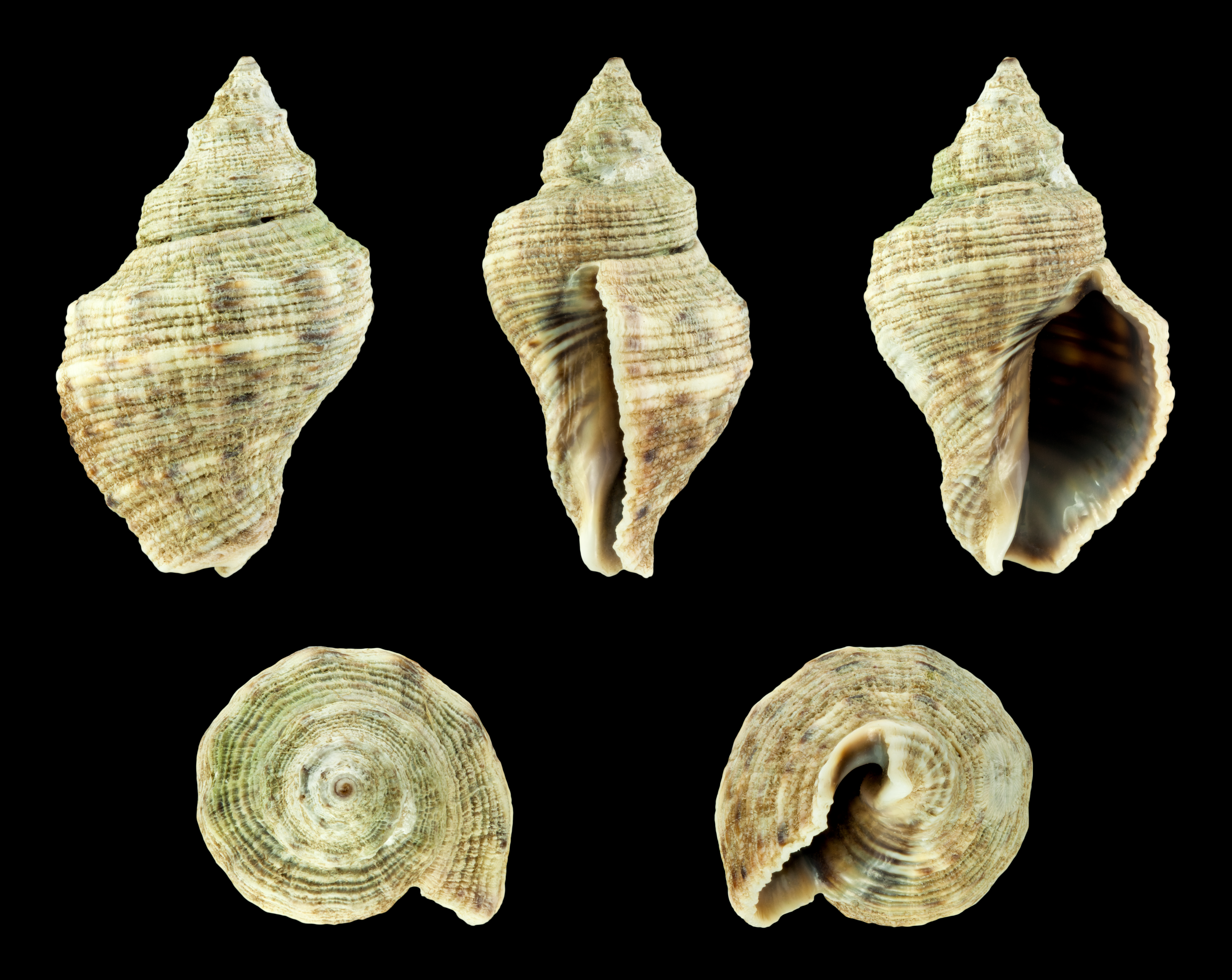
- Indothais rufotincta (Tan & Sigurdsson, 1996); Length 2.8 cm; Originating from the Thailand; Shell of own collection, therefore not geocoded

Scientific classification
- Kingdom: Animalia
- Phylum: Mollusca
- Class: Gastropoda
- Subclass: Caenogastropoda
- Order: Neogastropoda
- Family: Muricidae
- Genus: Indothais
- Species: I. rufotincta

Binomial name
- Indothais rufotincta (K. S. Tan & Sigurdsson, 1996)

Synonyms
- Thais (Thaisella) rufotincta Tan & Sigurdsson, 1996; Thais rufotincta K. S. Tan & Sigurdsson, 1996; Thaisella rufotincta (Tan & Sigurdsson, 1996)

= Indothais rufotincta =

Species of gastropod

Indothais rufotincta is a species of sea snail, a marine gastropod mollusk, in the family Muricidae, the murex snails or rock snails.

== Description ==
The length of the shell attains 30 mm.

== Distribution ==
This marine species occurs off Singapore.
