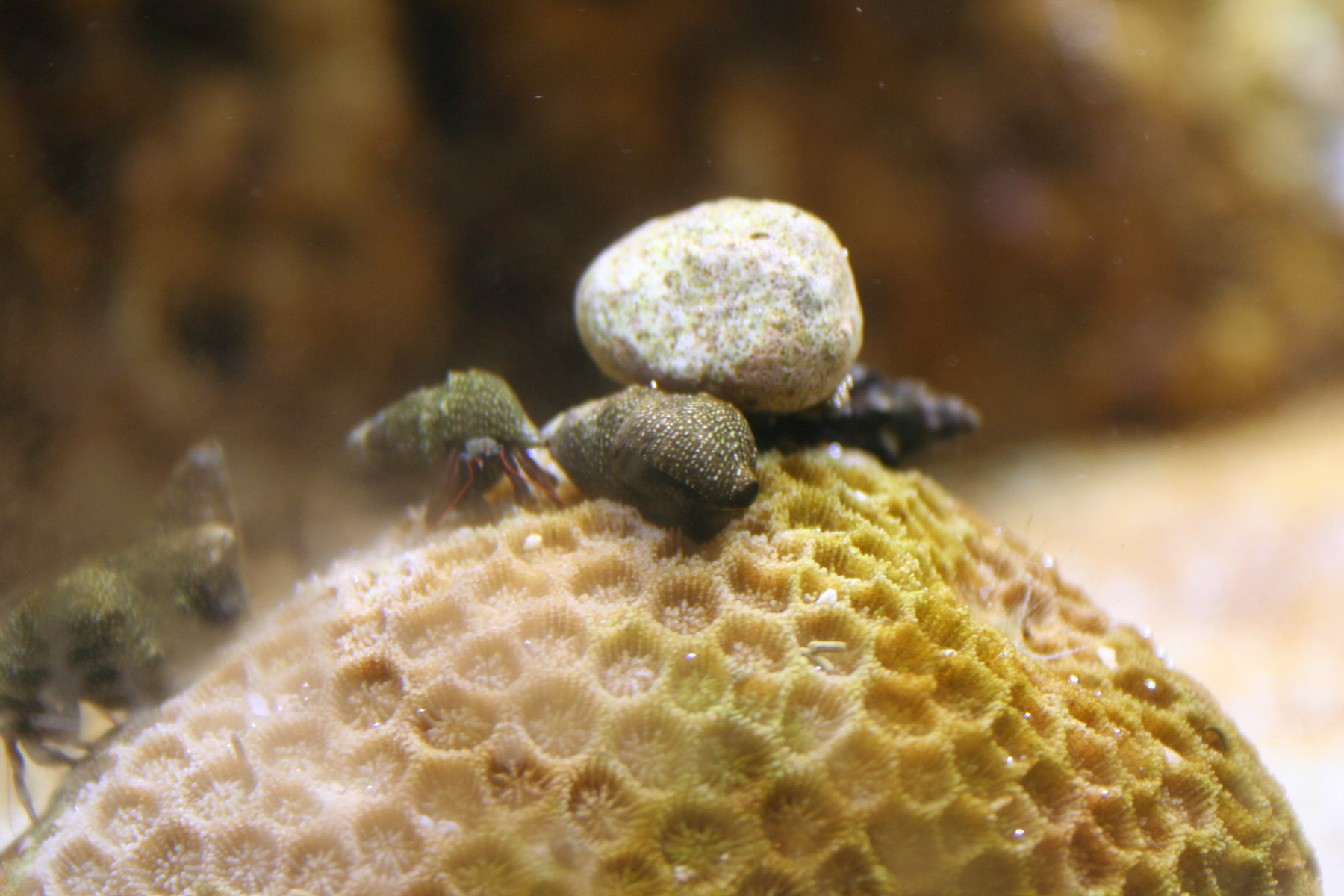

Scientific classification
- Domain: Eukaryota
- Kingdom: Animalia
- Phylum: Arthropoda
- Class: Malacostraca
- Order: Decapoda
- Suborder: Pleocyemata
- Infraorder: Anomura
- Family: Diogenidae
- Genus: Clibanarius
- Species: C. digueti

Binomial name
- Clibanarius digueti Bouvier, 1898

= Clibanarius digueti =

Species of crustacean

Clibanarius digueti is a species of hermit crab that lives off the western coast of Mexico, and is abundant in the Gulf of California. It is known under various common names such as the Mexican hermit crab, the blue-eyed spotted hermit or the Gulf of California hermit crab.

== Description ==
Both males and females of this species reach a length of approximately 2 centimetres (0.8 in).

== Behaviour ==
This species of hermit crab feeds on detritus, green algae, dead organic matter and shed exoskeletons. It has been known to attack snails or even other hermit crabs in order to steal their shells. It forms clusters of up to 700 individuals in low tide.
