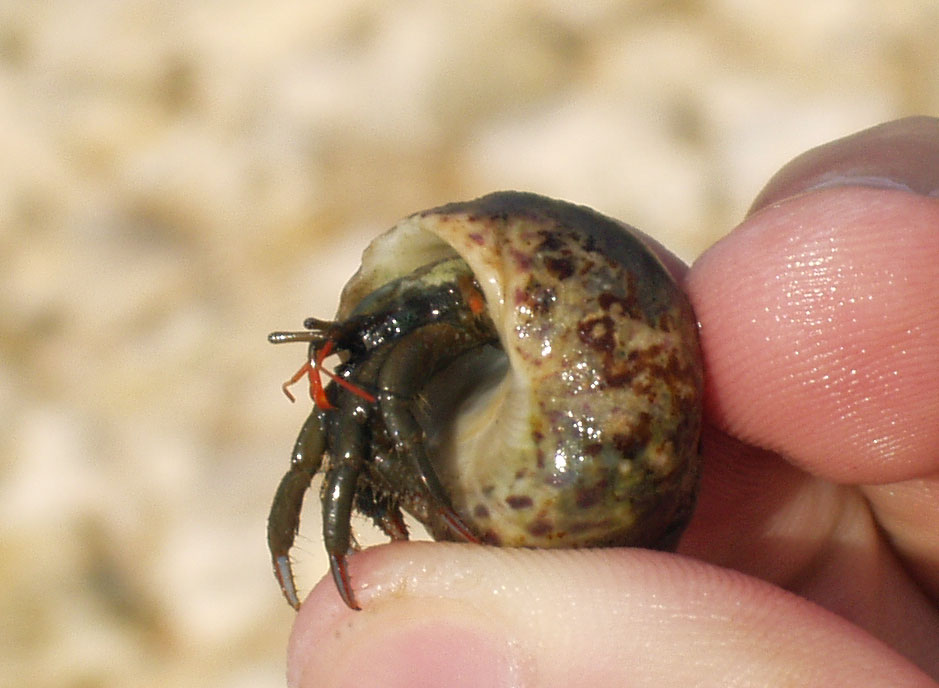

Scientific classification
- Domain: Eukaryota
- Kingdom: Animalia
- Phylum: Arthropoda
- Class: Malacostraca
- Order: Decapoda
- Suborder: Pleocyemata
- Infraorder: Anomura
- Family: Diogenidae
- Genus: Clibanarius
- Species: C. erythropus

Binomial name
- Clibanarius erythropus (Latreille, 1818)

Synonyms
- Clibanarius misanthropus (Risso, 1827); Pagurus erythropus Latreille, 1818; Pagurus hirsutus Costa, 1829–1838; Pagurus misanthropus Risso, 1827; Pagurus nigritarsis Lucas, 1846

= Clibanarius erythropus =

Species of crustacean

Clibanarius erythropus is a species of hermit crab that lives in rockpools and sublittoral waters. It is found in the Mediterranean Sea, Black Sea and eastern Atlantic Ocean from the Azores to Brittany, the Channel Islands and as far north as the south Cornwall coast. Individuals may grow up to a carapace length of 15 millimetres (0.6 in).

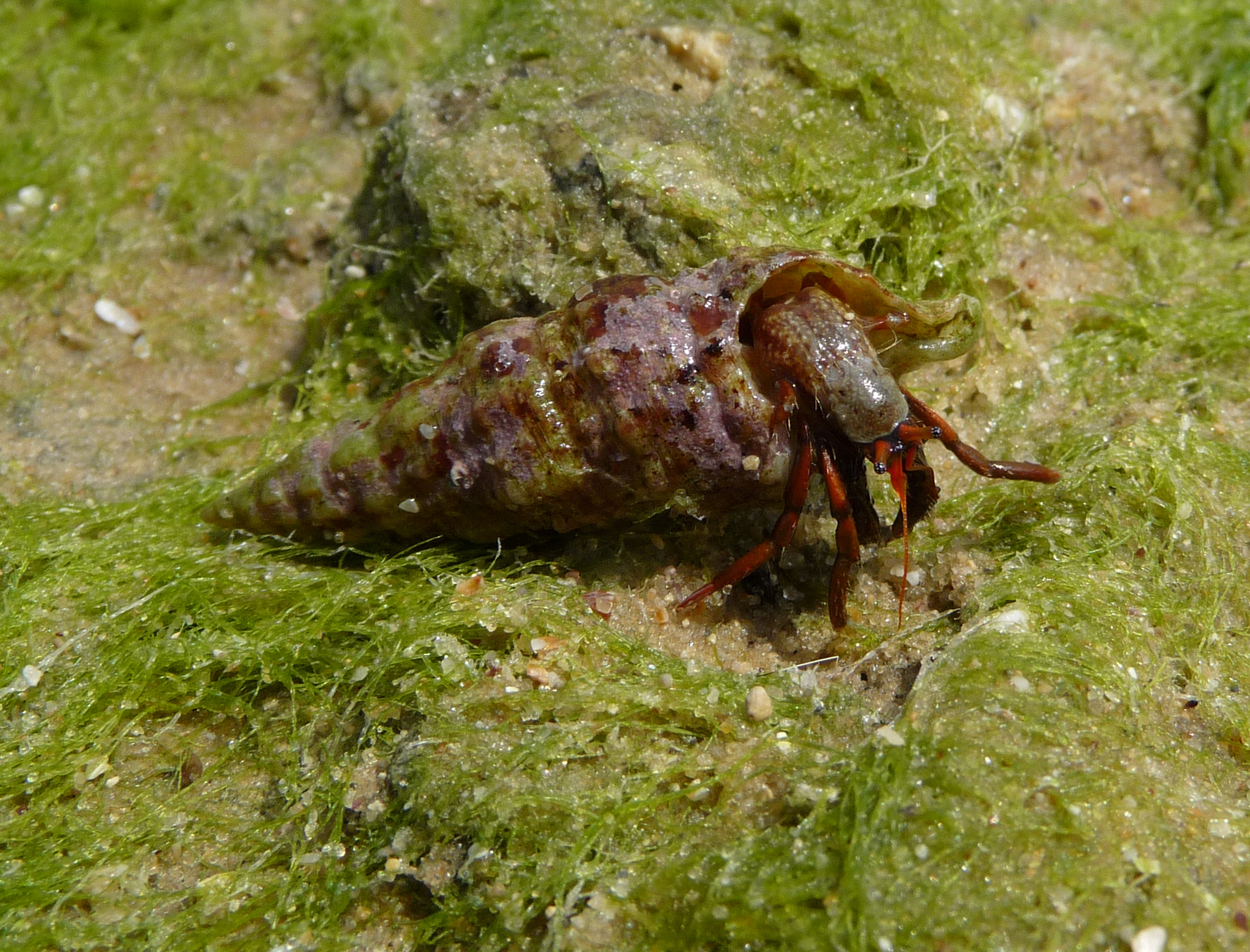
Clibanarius erythropus, the Black Sea

== Ecology ==
A variety of different gastropod shells are used by C. erythropus, the most frequent being Littorina striata, Mitra, Nassarius incrassatus and Stramonita haemastoma, which collectively account for 85% of all the individuals studied in the Azores; in the Mediterranean, shells of Cerithium, Alvania montagui and Pisania maculosa are most used by C. erythropus.

Like other hermit crabs, C. erythropus feeds on "organic debris, decayed and fresh macro-algae with associated fauna and epiphytic algal flora, small invertebrates, and macroscopic pieces of dead and live animal tissues". It has been shown that C. erythropus individuals select substrates where they can cover large distances, and that globose shells allow them greater mobility than elongate ones.

== In popular culture ==
In 2016 the BBC Springwatch programme highlighted C. erythropus and ran a competition to provide a vernacular name. The winning name was St Piran's crab, a process supported by National Trust West Cornwall and the Cornwall Wildlife Trust. Saint Piran is generally regarded as the patron saint of Cornwall, and was a hermit who survived being thrown into the sea.
