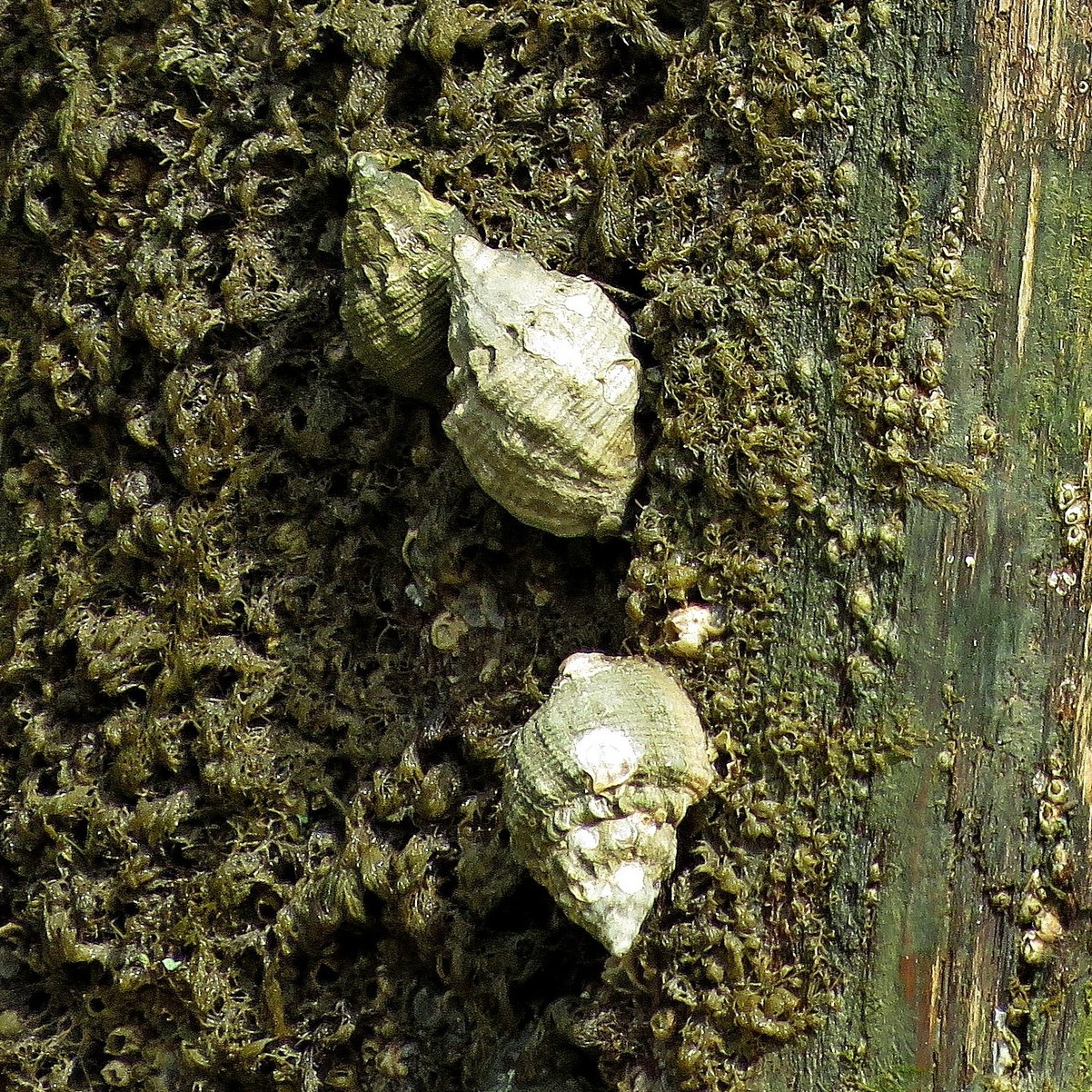

Scientific classification
- Kingdom: Animalia
- Phylum: Mollusca
- Class: Gastropoda
- Subclass: Caenogastropoda
- Order: Neogastropoda
- Superfamily: Muricoidea
- Family: Muricidae
- Subfamily: Rapaninae
- Genus: Thaisella
- Species: T. trinitatensis

Binomial name
- Thaisella trinitatensis (Guppy, 1869)

Synonyms
- Purpura trinitatensis Guppy, 1869; Thais coronata trinitatensis R.J.L. Guppy, 1869; Thais trinitatensis (Guppy, 1869) (superseded combination)

= Thaisella trinitatensis =

Species of gastropod

Thaisella trinitatensis is a species of sea snail, a marine gastropod mollusc, in the family Muricidae, the murex snails or rock snails.

== Description ==
The length of the shell attains 45 mm.

== Distribution and habitat ==
The type locality is contained in Trinidad and Tobago; also in the Atlantic Ocean off Brazil.

This species is found in both brackish and marine habitats:
