= Thaisella mariae =

Scientific classification
- Kingdom: Animalia
- Phylum: Mollusca
- Class: Gastropoda
- Subclass: Caenogastropoda
- Order: Neogastropoda
- Superfamily: Muricoidea
- Family: Muricidae
- Subfamily: Rapaninae
- Genus: Thaisella
- Species: T. mariae

Binomial name
- Thaisella mariae (Morretes, 1954)

Synonyms
- Thais (Thaisella) mariae Morretes, 1954; Thais mariae Morretes, 1954

Species of gastropod

Thaisella mariae is a species of sea snail, a marine gastropod mollusk, in the family Muricidae, the murex snails or rock snails.

== Description ==
The length of the shell attains 27 mm.

== Distribution ==
This species occurs in the Atlantic Ocean off Brazil.
