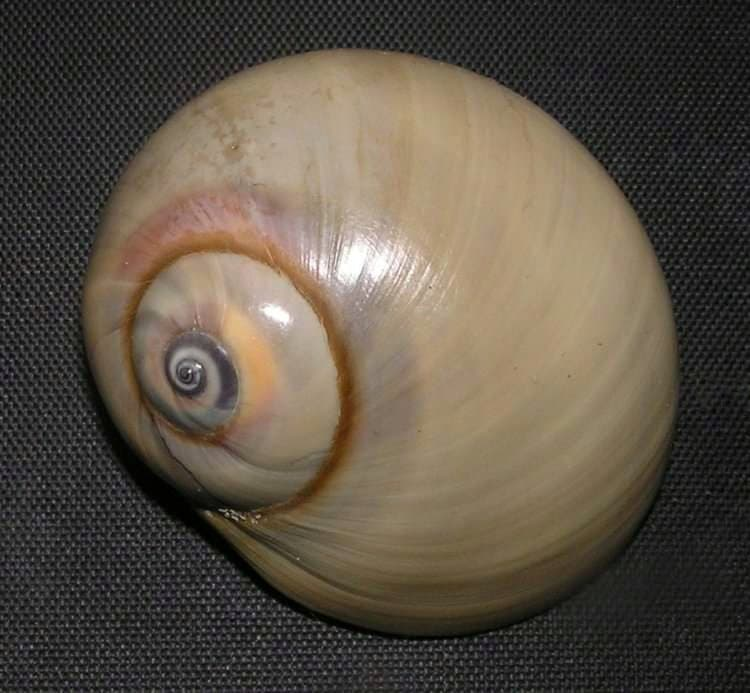

Scientific classification
- Kingdom: Animalia
- Phylum: Mollusca
- Class: Gastropoda
- Subclass: Caenogastropoda
- Order: Littorinimorpha
- Family: Naticidae
- Genus: Neverita
- Species: N. delessertiana

Binomial name
- Neverita delessertiana (Récluz, 1843)

= Neverita delessertiana =

Species of mollusc

Neverita delessertiana is a species of predatory sea snail, a marine gastropod mollusc in the family Naticidae, the moon snails.

N. delessertiana was long considered to be merely a form of the much more common and much more widely distributed species Neverita duplicata. In 2006 a paper was published which made it clear that Neverita delessertiana is a different species than N. duplicata.

== Distribution ==
This species is found in the United States in Florida, Alabama, Mississippi, Louisiana and Texas.

== Description ==
The maximum recorded shell length is 67.5 mm.

== Habitat ==
The minimum recorded depth for this species is 0 m; the maximum recorded depth is 0 m.
