= Thaisella forbesii =

Scientific classification
- Kingdom: Animalia
- Phylum: Mollusca
- Class: Gastropoda
- Subclass: Caenogastropoda
- Order: Neogastropoda
- Superfamily: Muricoidea
- Family: Muricidae
- Subfamily: Rapaninae
- Genus: Thaisella
- Species: T. forbesii

Binomial name
- Thaisella forbesii (Dunker, 1853)

Synonyms
- Purpura forbesii Dunker, 1853; Stramonita haemastoma forbesi R.W. Dunker, 1853; Thais (Thaisella) langi Clench & R. D. Turner, 1948; Thais forbesii Dunker; Thais langi Clench & R. D. Turner, 1948

Species of gastropod

Thaisella forbesii is a species of sea snail, a marine gastropod mollusk, in the family Muricidae, the murex snails or rock snails.

== Description ==
The length of the shell attains 38 mm.

== Distribution ==
This species occurs off the Ivory Coast.
