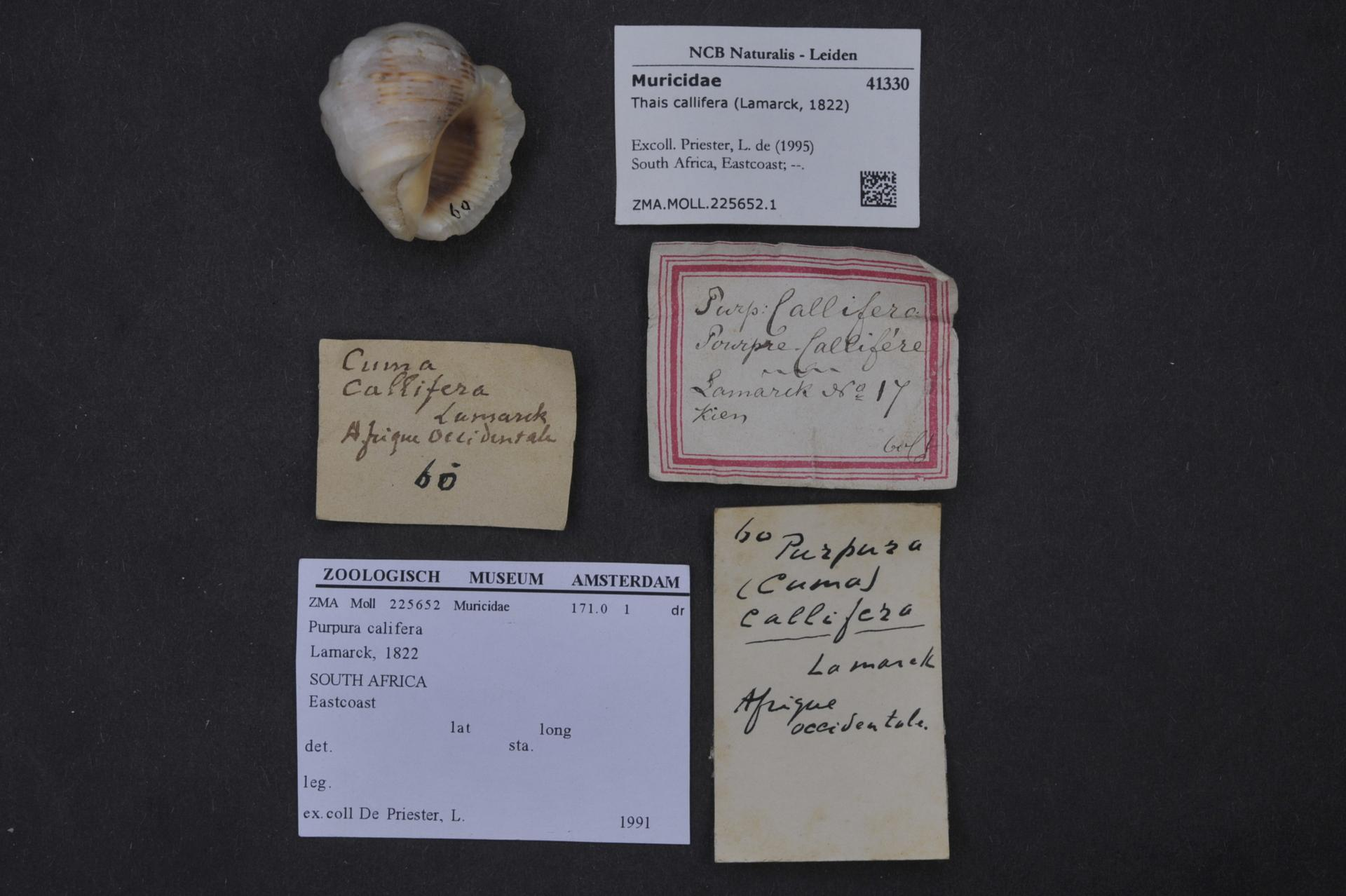
- Shell of Thaisella callifera (specimen at Naturalis Biodiversity Center)

Scientific classification
- Kingdom: Animalia
- Phylum: Mollusca
- Class: Gastropoda
- Subclass: Caenogastropoda
- Order: Neogastropoda
- Superfamily: Muricoidea
- Family: Muricidae
- Subfamily: Rapaninae
- Genus: Thaisella
- Species: T. callifera

Binomial name
- Thaisella callifera (Lamarck, 1822)

Synonyms
- Purpura callifera Lamarck, 1822; Thais (Thaisella) callifera (Lamarck, 1822); Thais coronata callifera (Lamarck, 1822)

= Thaisella callifera =

Species of gastropod

Thaisella callifera is a species of sea snail, a marine gastropod mollusk, in the family Muricidae, the murex snails or rock snails.
