= Thaisella guatemalteca =

Scientific classification
- Kingdom: Animalia
- Phylum: Mollusca
- Class: Gastropoda
- Subclass: Caenogastropoda
- Order: Neogastropoda
- Superfamily: Muricoidea
- Family: Muricidae
- Subfamily: Rapaninae
- Genus: Thaisella
- Species: T. guatemalteca

Binomial name
- Thaisella guatemalteca Simone, 2017

Species of gastropod

Thaisella guatemalteca is a species of sea snail, a marine gastropod mollusk, in the family Muricidae, the murex snails or rock snails.

== Distribution ==
This species occurs in Guatemalan part of the Caribbean Sea.

== Habitat ==
This species is found in the following habitats:

- Brackish
- Marine
