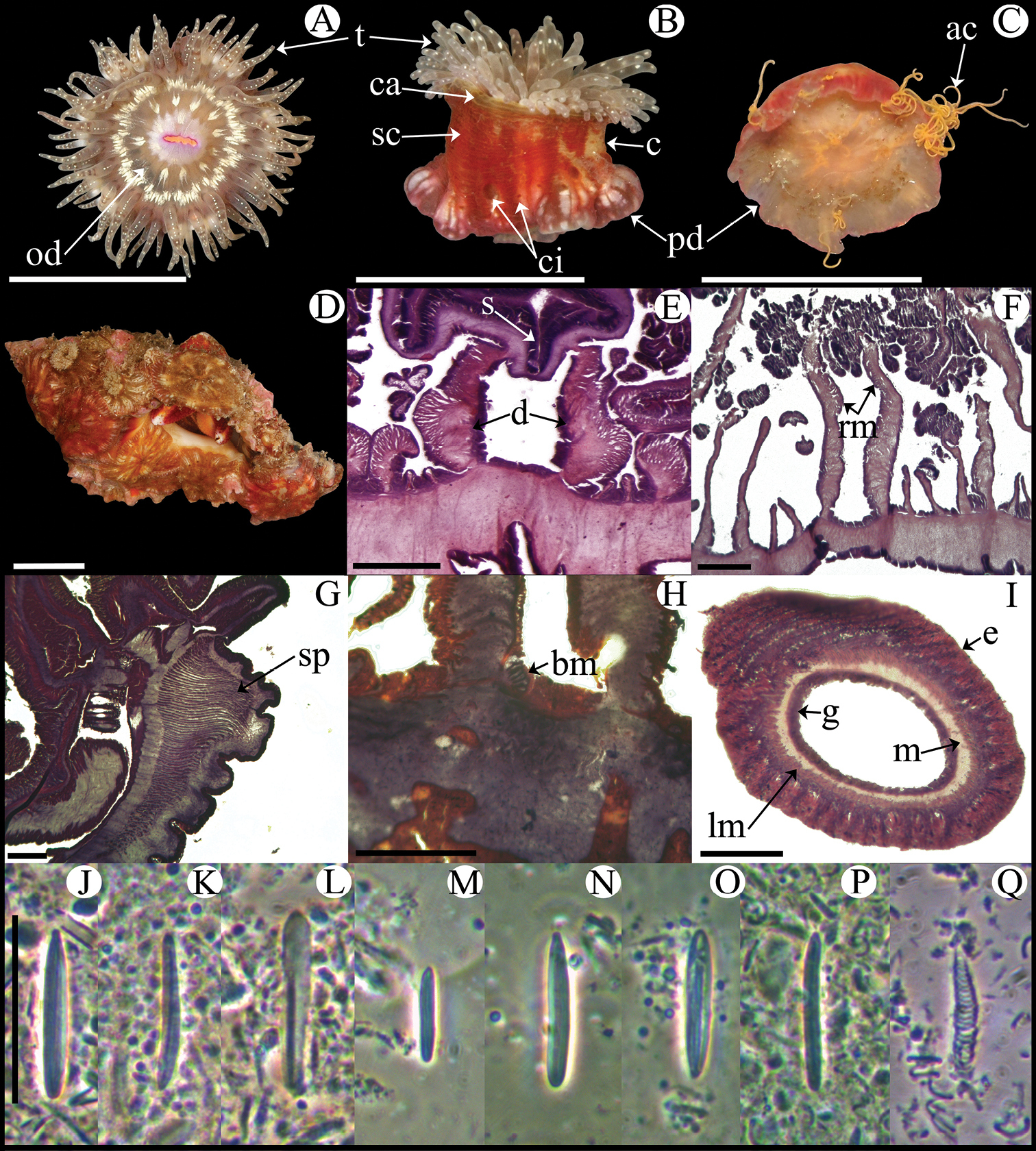

Scientific classification
- Kingdom: Animalia
- Phylum: Cnidaria
- Subphylum: Anthozoa
- Class: Hexacorallia
- Order: Actiniaria
- Family: Hormathiidae
- Genus: Calliactis
- Species: C. tricolor

Binomial name
- Calliactis tricolor (Lesueur, 1817)

Synonyms
- Actinia bicolor Le Sueur, 1817; Actinia tricolor Le Sueur, 1817; Adamsia bicolor Le Sueur, 1817; Adamsia egletes Duchassaing de Fombressin & Michelotti, 1866; Adamsia tricolor (Le Sueur, 1817); Calliactis bicolor (Le Sueur); Calliactis egletes Duchassaing de Fombressin & Michelotti; Cereus bicolor

= Calliactis tricolor =

Species of sea anemone

Calliactis tricolor, the tricolor anemone or hitchhiking anemone, is a species of sea anemone in the family Hormathiidae. It occurs in the Caribbean Sea and the Gulf of Mexico. It can be found attached to rocks but is often attached to a living crab or mollusc or an empty shell occupied by a hermit crab.

== Description ==
Calliactis tricolor is conical in shape with a smooth outer surface and a wide base. The height of the column varies from 2.5 to 7.5 centimetres (0.98 to 2.95 in). The colour is some shade of dull red, brown, olive or purple with cream stripes and there is a band of dark coloured spots near the base. The oral disc has a fringe of about 200 short white, orange or pink tentacles. The mouth is in the centre surrounded by bands of yellow, red and pinkish-purple colour. When threatened by a predator, the anemone can release orange or white threads armed with stinging cnidocytes.

== Distribution ==
Calliactis tricolor is found in the Caribbean Sea, the Gulf of Mexico and the eastern coast of Florida.

== Reproduction ==
Calliactis tricolor can reproduce asexually by longitudinal fission. Prior to that observation, its method of reproduction was unknown, but the finding of a number of very small specimens in one location indicates that sexual reproduction may also sometimes take place.

== Ecology ==
Calliactis tricolor may adhere to a rock but is usually found attached to the hard surface of a living animal. This can be the carapace of a crab, a hermit crab occupying an empty gastropod shell, a clam or other living mollusc such as the tulip shell (Fasciolaria tulipa) or the Caribbean crown conch (Melongena melongena). This is a symbiotic relationship; the anemone benefits from greater access to food as its host moves around, and the host benefits from the protection from predators provided by the anemone's stinging cells.

The shell occupied by the thinstripe hermit crab (Clibanarius vittatus) often carries a tricolor anemone. This is usually quite small but may be several centimetres in diameter. The crab actively collects the anemone from a base on a rock and places it on its shell. It later transfers it to a new shell when it has outgrown the present shell and needs to move into larger quarters.

Calliactis tricolor is often found attached to a gastropod shell occupied by another hermit crab, Dardanus venosus. On finding an anemone, or after moving into a new shell, this hermit crab taps the edge of the base of the anemone several times with its claw. This causes it to relax and the crab can then lift it off the surface to which it was attached and place it onto its new home. The anemone clings there with its tentacles until its base is firmly settled in place. In a trial, Dardanus venosus showed a preference for large anemones over small ones. It placed a large one on the top of its shell. When offered small ones, it ate some of them, and placed others close to the opening of its shell.
