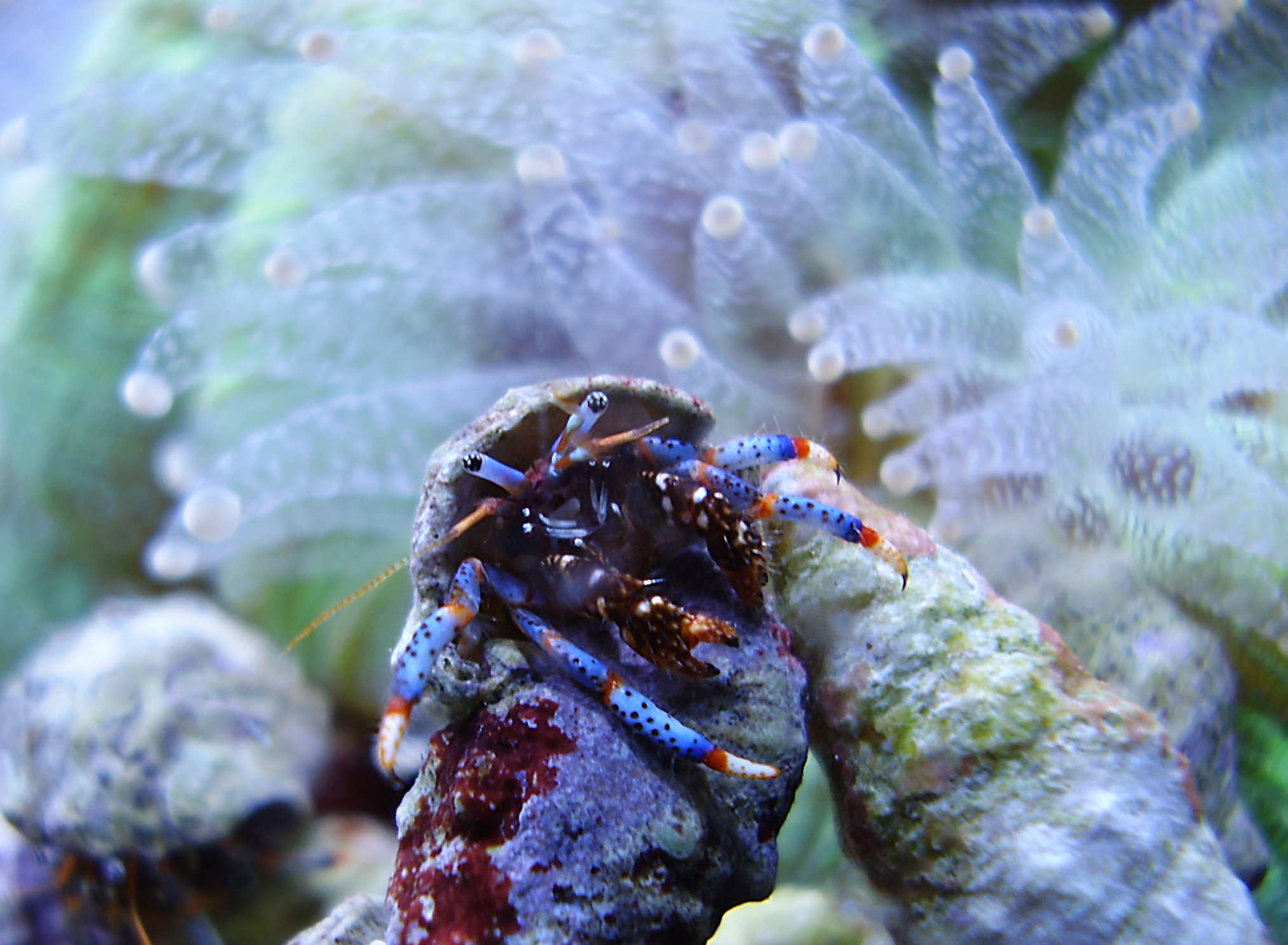

Scientific classification
- Kingdom: Animalia
- Phylum: Arthropoda
- Class: Malacostraca
- Order: Decapoda
- Suborder: Pleocyemata
- Infraorder: Anomura
- Family: Diogenidae
- Genus: Clibanarius
- Species: C. tricolor

Binomial name
- Clibanarius tricolor (Gibbes, 1850)

Synonyms
- Clibanarius brachyops Bouvier, 1918

= Clibanarius tricolor =

Species of crustacean

Clibanarius tricolor is a hermit crab that lives in shallow water of the Caribbean Sea and is popular in the home aquarium trade. Its common names include blue-legged hermit crab, tricolor hermit crab, blueleg reef hermit crab, equal handed hermit crab and blueleg hermit crab.

== Description ==
C. tricolor has blue legs with red banding between each segment, and reaches to 2 centimeters (0.79 in) in size. Males of this species as most other hermit crab species are bigger than the females.

== Feeding ==
C. tricolor is a detritivore, eating dead plants and animals that would otherwise clog the reef.

It also eats green hair algae, cyanobacteria and seaweed. It even sifts through sand looking for food, cleaning the sand in the process.

== Behavior ==
During the day the crabs move slowly or rest, feeding usually begins at dusk and continues through the night. They usually congregate in rocky areas with 30cm of water. Members of the same group usually move in one general direction when feeding, think of a group of grazing cattle. By 4:30 in the morning they are back to their congregation. It seems that most of the crabs stay with their same respective groups day after day.

Shell fighting in this species also occurs. When the attacking crab approaches another, some aggressive moments may be made or the other crab may retreat. The attacking crab approaches from behind and turns the other crab on its back. The attacker may proceed to spin the victim and shell multiple times. The attacker's shell is then raised and then brought down rapidly. This process usually happens multiple times, until finally the attacker kicks the victim out of the shell. If this process fails the victim may remain upside down, where another attack may occur.

== In the aquarium ==
C. tricolor is a popular aquarium hermit crab because of its coloration and because its feeding habits lead it to clean tanks. It is emblematic of the public's shift from purely decorative animals to "working" animals that help sustain the aquarium's ecosystem, reducing the need for active management by the owner.
