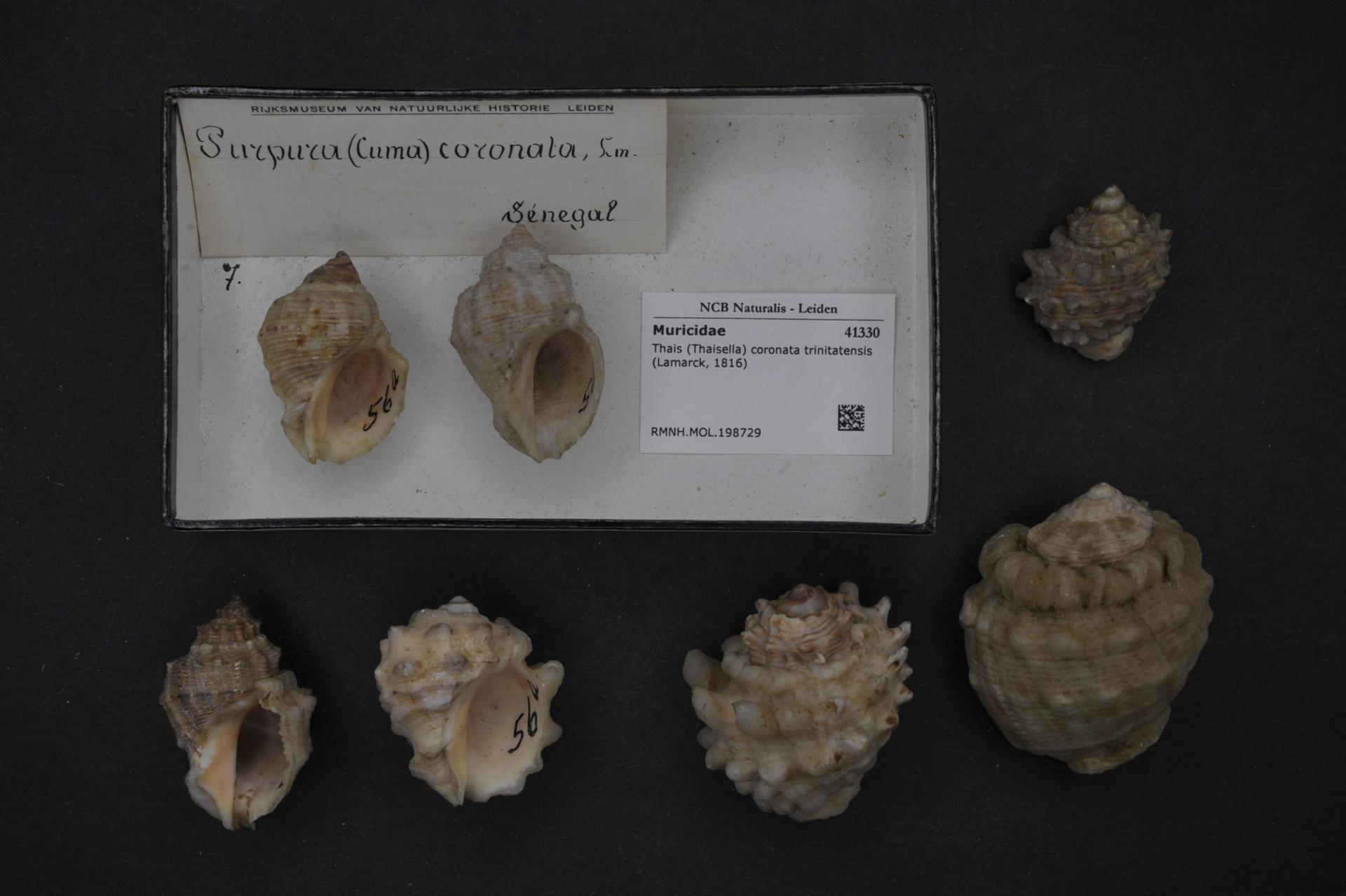
- Shell of Thaisella coronata (specimen at Naturalis Biodiversity Center)

Scientific classification
- Kingdom: Animalia
- Phylum: Mollusca
- Class: Gastropoda
- Subclass: Caenogastropoda
- Order: Neogastropoda
- Superfamily: Muricoidea
- Family: Muricidae
- Subfamily: Rapaninae
- Genus: Thaisella
- Species: T. coronata

Binomial name
- Thaisella coronata (Lamarck, 1816)

Synonyms
- Purpura coronata Lamarck, 1816; Purpura guineensis Schubert & Wagner, 1829; Thais (Thaisella) coronata (Lamarck, 1816); Thais brujensis M. Smith, 1946; Thais coronata (Lamarck, 1816); Thais coronata trinitatensis (Guppy, 1869)

= Thaisella coronata =

Species of gastropod

Thaisella coronata is a species of sea snail, a marine gastropod mollusk, in the family Muricidae, the murex snails or rock snails.

== Description ==
The length of the shell attains 45 mm.

== Distribution ==
This species occurs in the Atlantic Ocean off Brazil.
