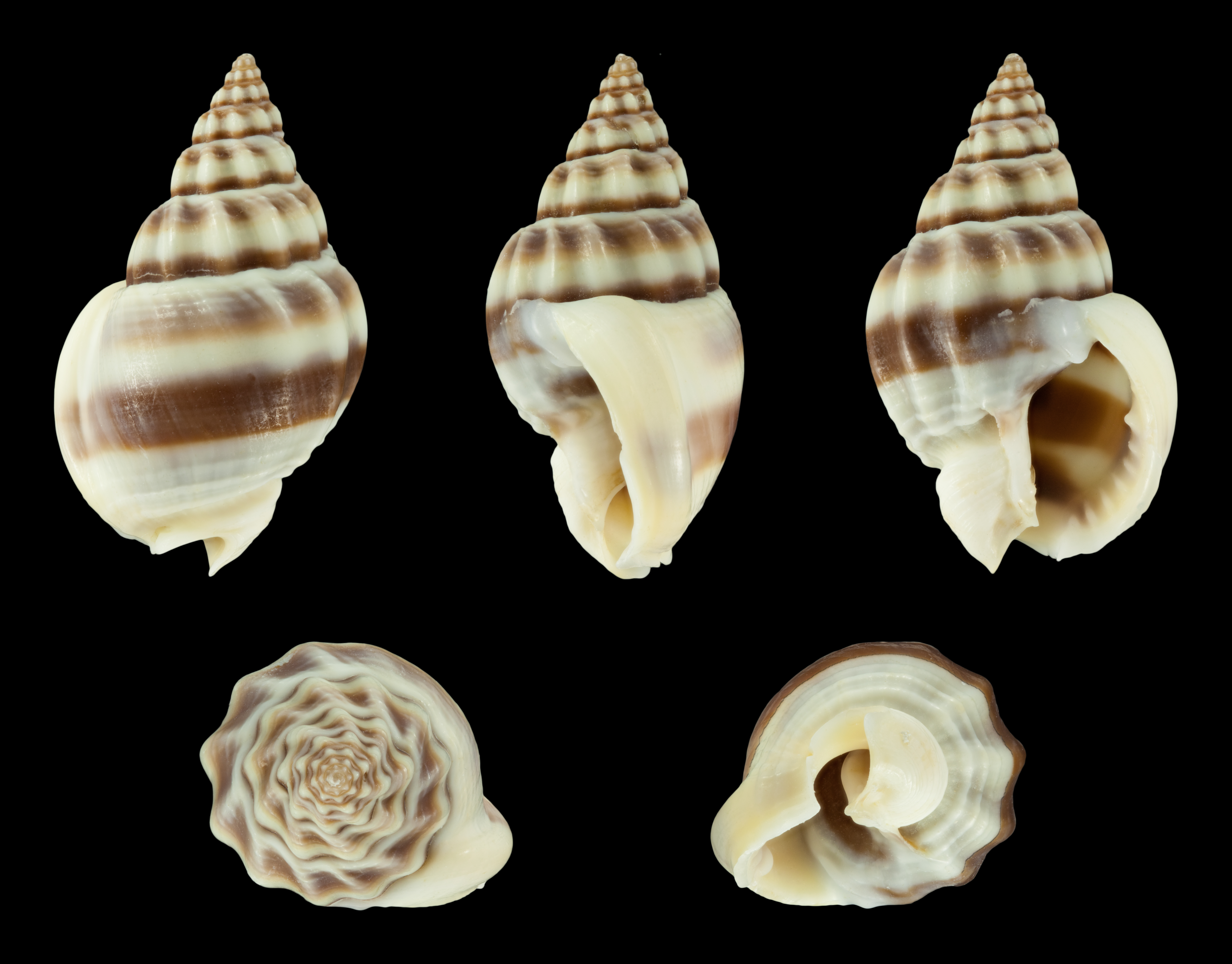
- A shell of Nassarius stolatus

Scientific classification
- Kingdom: Animalia
- Phylum: Mollusca
- Class: Gastropoda
- Subclass: Caenogastropoda
- Order: Neogastropoda
- Family: Nassariidae
- Genus: Nassarius
- Species: N. stolatus

Binomial name
- Nassarius stolatus (Gmelin, 1791)

Synonyms
- Buccinum ornatum Kiener, 1834 (invalid: junior homonym of Buccinum ornatum Say, 1822); Buccinum stolatum Gmelin, 1791 (original combination); Distorsio communis Röding, 1798; Nassa (Hima) stolata (Gmelin, 1791); Nassa fasciata Chemnitz, 1780 (unavailable name published in a work placed on the Official Index); Nassa fasciata Mörch, 1852 (invalid: junior secondary homonym of Buccinum fasciatum Lamarck, 1822); Nassa ornata (Kiener, 1834); Nassa stolata (Gmelin, 1791); Nassarius (Niotha) stolatus (Gmelin, 1791) · accepted, alternate representation; Nassarius ornatus (Kiener, 1834)

= Nassarius stolatus =

Species of gastropod

Nassarius stolatus is a species of sea snail, a marine gastropod mollusc in the family Nassariidae, the Nassa mud snails or dog whelks.

== Description ==
The length of the shell varies from 15 mm to 30 mm.

The ovate, conical shell is pointed at the summit . The pyramidal spire is formed of six or seven distinct, smooth, convex whorls. These are covered with very prominent, convex, longitudinal folds, intersected only at the base, and upon the two or three upper whorls, by a few pretty deep transverse striae. Upon these whorls the striae become finer and more approximate. They rarely exist upon the whole surface. In like manner the longitudinal folds do not appear upon the right portion of the body whorl. The color is of a violaceous white. A dark red zone borders the suture, and a broader and browner band surrounds also the middle of the body whorl.

== Distribution ==
This marine species occurs off India (Ratnagiri district, Maharashtra), Sri Lanka, Indonesia and Thailand; in the Mediterranean Sea as an introduced species.
