= Indothais wutingi =

Scientific classification
- Kingdom: Animalia
- Phylum: Mollusca
- Class: Gastropoda
- Subclass: Caenogastropoda
- Order: Neogastropoda
- Family: Muricidae
- Genus: Indothais
- Species: I. wutingi

Binomial name
- Indothais wutingi (Tan, 1997)

Synonyms
- Thais (Thaisella) wutingi Tan, 1997; Thais wutingi Tan, 1997; Thaisella wutingi (Tan, 1997)

Species of gastropod

Indothais wutingi is a species of sea snail, a marine gastropod mollusk, in the family Muricidae, the murex snails or rock snails.

== Distribution ==
This marine species occurs off Australia.
