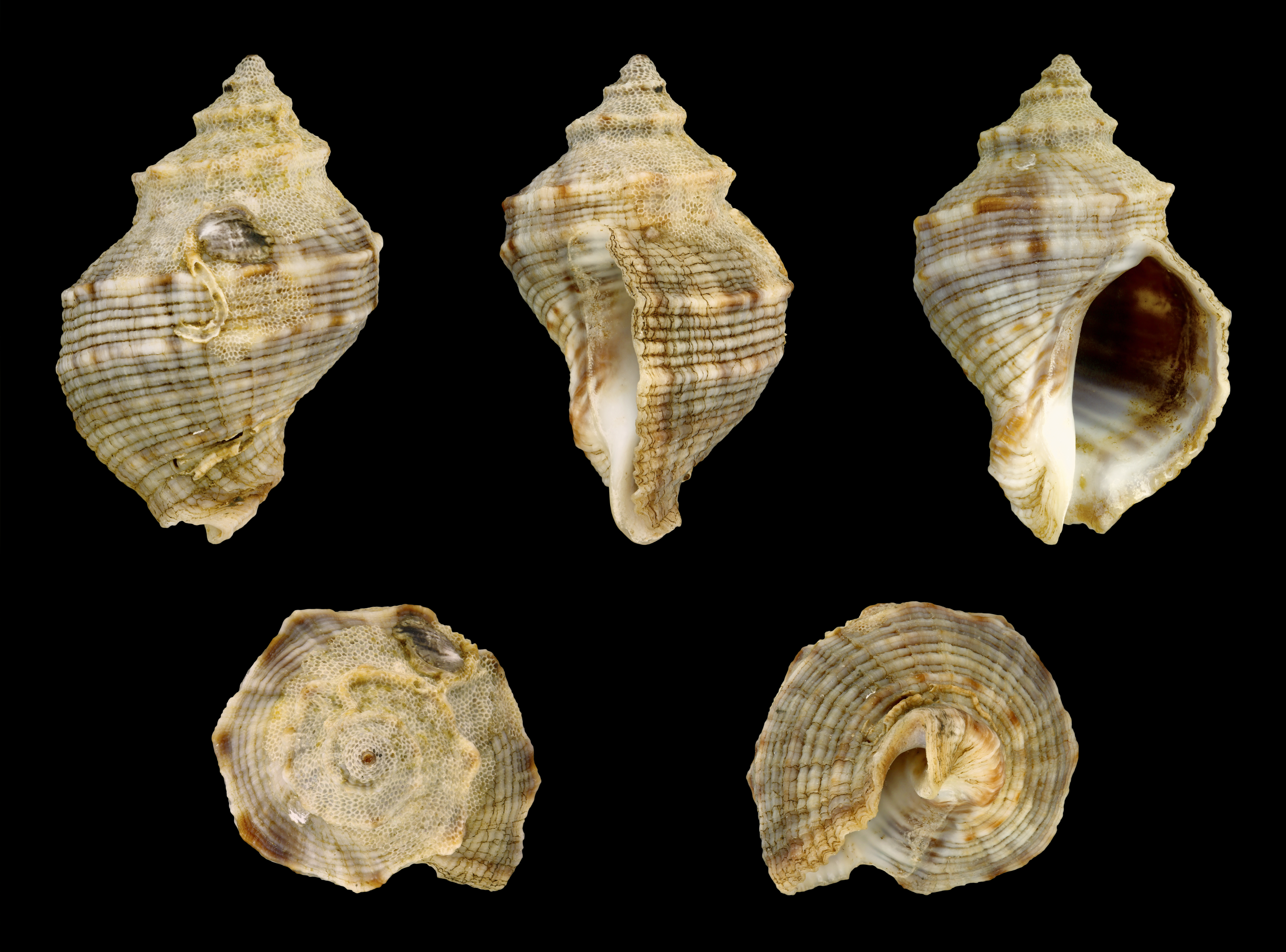
- Indothais malayensis shell

Scientific classification
- Kingdom: Animalia
- Phylum: Mollusca
- Class: Gastropoda
- Subclass: Caenogastropoda
- Order: Neogastropoda
- Family: Muricidae
- Genus: Indothais
- Species: I. malayensis

Binomial name
- Indothais malayensis (Tan & Sigurdsson, 1996)

Synonyms
- Thais (Thaisella) malayensis Tan & Sigurdsson, 1996; Thais malayensis Tan & Sigurdsson, 1996; Thaisella malayensis (Tan & Sigurdsson, 1996)

= Indothais malayensis =

Species of sea snail

Indothais malayensis is a species of sea snail, a marine gastropod mollusk in the family Muricidae, the murex snails or rock snails.

== Description ==
The length of the shell attains 41 mm.

== Distribution ==
This species occurs in the Taiwan Strait.
