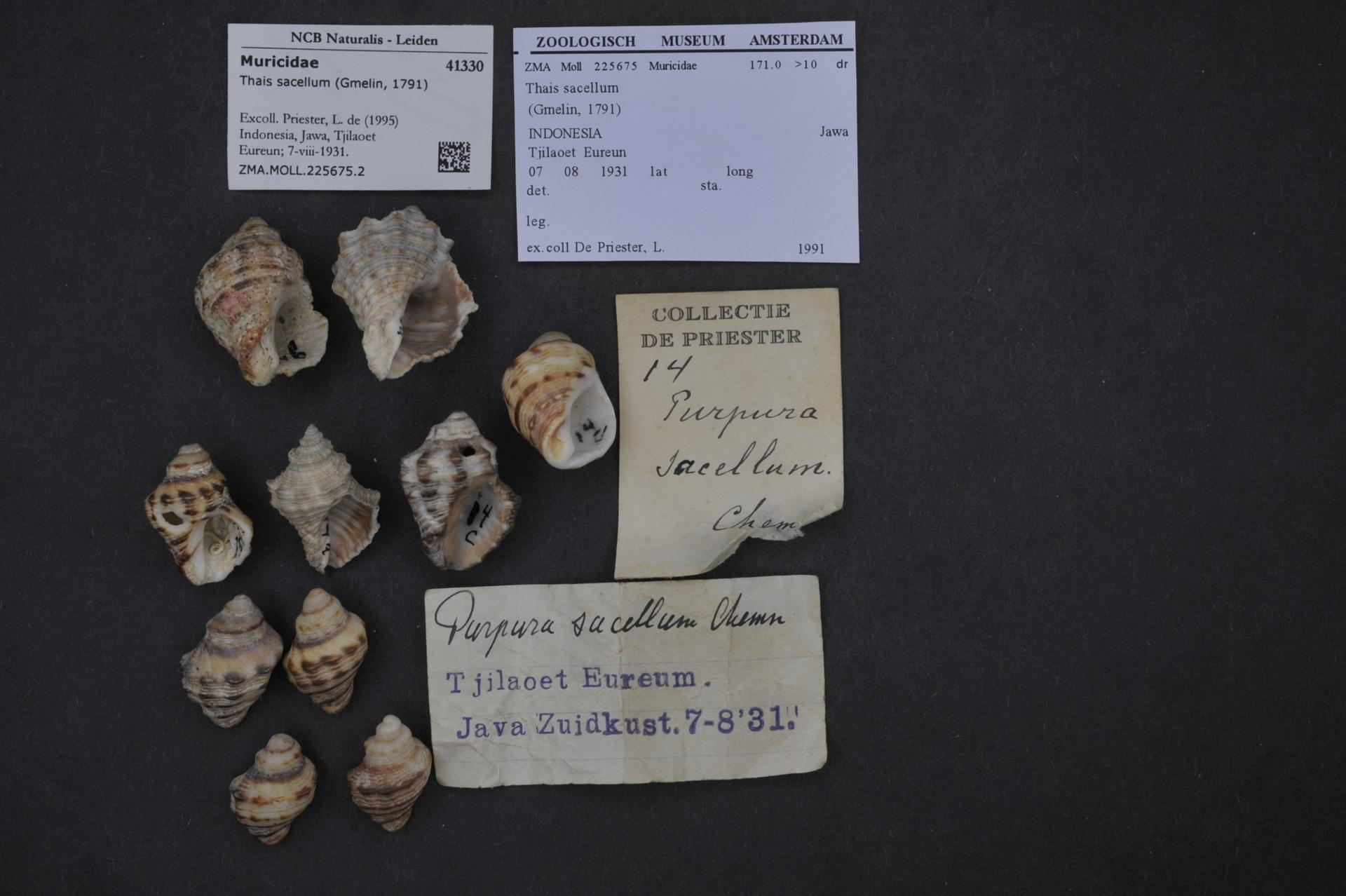
- Shell of Indothais sacellum (specimen at Naturalis Biodiversity Center)

Scientific classification
- Kingdom: Animalia
- Phylum: Mollusca
- Class: Gastropoda
- Subclass: Caenogastropoda
- Order: Neogastropoda
- Family: Muricidae
- Genus: Indothais
- Species: I. sacellum

Binomial name
- Indothais sacellum (Gmelin, 1791)

Synonyms
- Drupa muricina Röding, 1798; Lataxiena taiwanica Shikama, 1978; Murex rugosa Born, 1780 (non Born, 1778); Murex sacellum Gmelin, 1791; Purpura diadema Reeve, 1846; Thais (Thaisella) sacellum (Gmelin, 1791); Thaisella sacellum (Gmelin, 1791)

= Indothais sacellum =

Species of gastropod

Indothais sacellum is a species of sea snail, a marine gastropod mollusk, in the family Muricidae, the murex snails or rock snails.
