= Indothais javanica =

Scientific classification
- Kingdom: Animalia
- Phylum: Mollusca
- Class: Gastropoda
- Subclass: Caenogastropoda
- Order: Neogastropoda
- Superfamily: Muricoidea
- Family: Muricidae
- Subfamily: Rapaninae
- Genus: Indothais
- Species: I. javanica

Binomial name
- Indothais javanica (Philippi, 1848)

Synonyms
- Purpura javanica Philippi, 1848; Thais (Thaisella) javanica (Philippi, 1848); Thaisella javanica (Philippi, 1848)

Species of gastropod

Indothais javanica is a species of sea snail, a marine gastropod mollusk, in the family Muricidae, the murex snails or rock snails.

== Description ==
The length of the shell attains 26 mm.

== Distribution ==
This marine species occurs off Western Australia.
