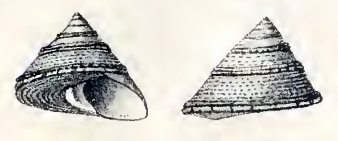
- Drawing with two views of a shell of Calliostoma tranquebaricum

Scientific classification
- Kingdom: Animalia
- Phylum: Mollusca
- Class: Gastropoda
- Subclass: Vetigastropoda
- Order: Trochida
- Family: Calliostomatidae
- Genus: Calliostoma
- Species: C. tranquebaricum

Binomial name
- Calliostoma tranquebaricum (Röding, 1798)

Synonyms
- Calliostoma (Calliostoma) tranquebarica (Röding, 1798); Trochus tranquebaricus Röding, 1798; Ziziphinus tranquebaricus Chemnitz

= Calliostoma tranquebaricum =

Species of gastropod

Calliostoma tranquebaricum is a species of sea snail, a marine gastropod mollusk in the family Calliostomatidae.

== Description ==
The size of the shell varies between 10 mm and 18.5 mm. The imperforate, solid shell has a conical shape. It is very pale colored, almost white, minutely tessellated on the ribs with light brown. The periphery has larger spots of the same. The surface of the shell is finely spirally striate, the striae about 8 on the body whorl, with a couple of stronger ribs at the periphery, which are visible above the suture on the spire whorls. The short spire is conic, acute, with its lateral outlines rectilinear. The 7–8 whorls are flat, the last one acutely carinated, and flat beneath. The oblique aperture is rhomboidal, smooth and nacreous within. The short columella is arcuate and obliquely truncate at its base.

This species is easily recognized by the low-conical form, the finely sculptured flat whorls, edged at periphery and its sutures by a pair of strong lirae.

== Distribution ==
This marine species occurs off India, Sri Lanka and Vietnam.
