= Indothais pinangensis =

Scientific classification
- Kingdom: Animalia
- Phylum: Mollusca
- Class: Gastropoda
- Subclass: Caenogastropoda
- Order: Neogastropoda
- Family: Muricidae
- Genus: Indothais
- Species: I. pinangensis

Binomial name
- Indothais pinangensis (K. S. Tan & Sigurdsson, 1996)

Synonyms
- Thais (Thaisella) pinangensis Tan & Sigurdsson, 1996; Thais pinangensis K. S. Tan & Sigurdsson, 1996; Thaisella pinangensis (Tan & Sigurdsson, 1996)

Species of gastropod

Indothais pinangensis is a species of sea snail, a marine gastropod mollusk, in the family Muricidae, the murex snails or rock snails.
