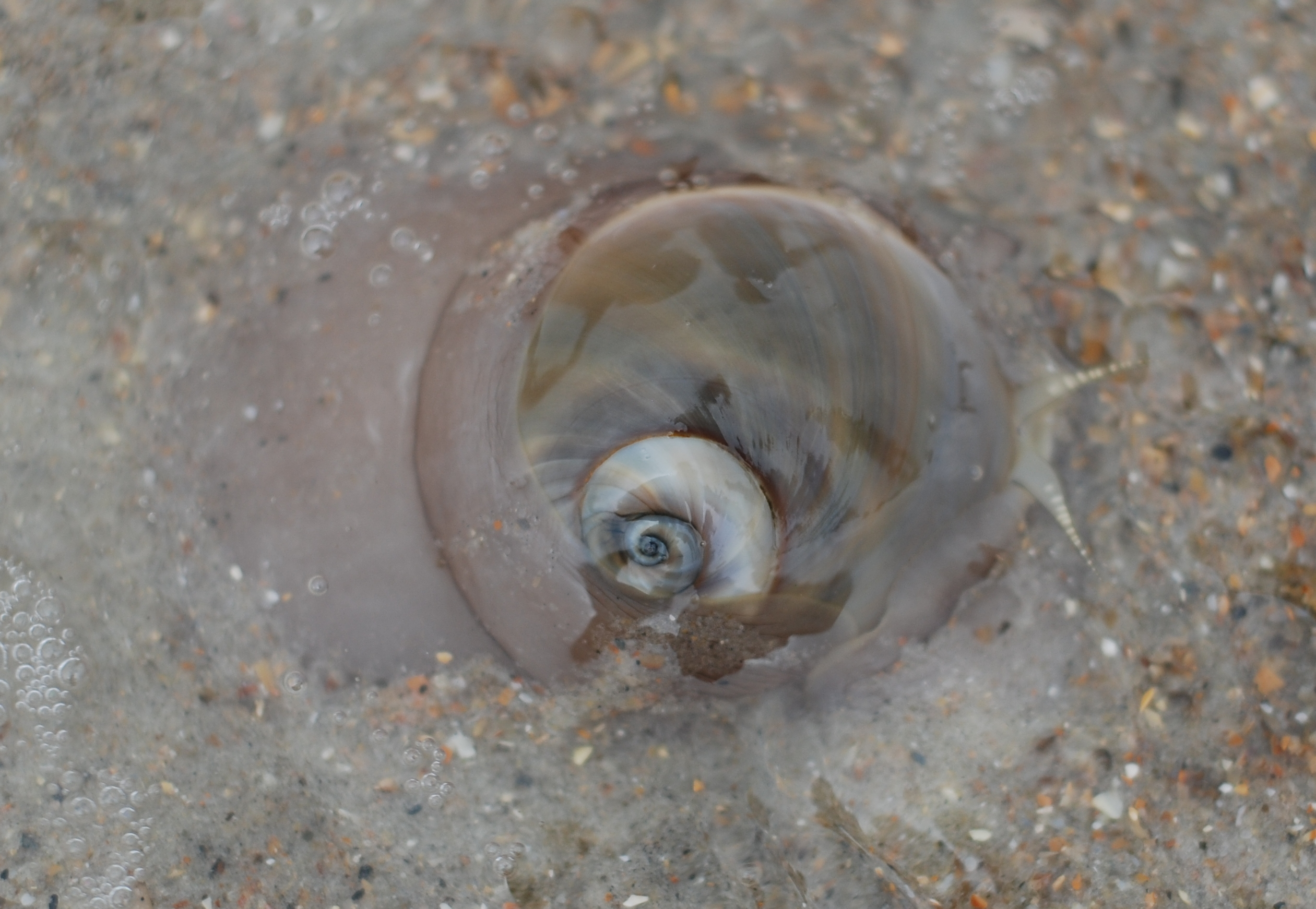
- A live Neverita duplicata at Core Banks, North Carolina

Scientific classification
- Kingdom: Animalia
- Phylum: Mollusca
- Class: Gastropoda
- Subclass: Caenogastropoda
- Order: Littorinimorpha
- Family: Naticidae
- Genus: Neverita
- Species: N. duplicata

Binomial name
- Neverita duplicata (Say, 1822)

Synonyms
- Polinices duplicatus (Say, 1822)

= Neverita duplicata =

Species of mollusc

Neverita duplicata, common name the shark eye, is a species of predatory sea snail, a marine gastropod mollusk in the family Naticidae, the moon snails.

In 2006, a paper was published which made it clear that a second, very similar, species with a smaller range of distribution also lives in part of the range inhabited by Neverita duplicata. The second species had previously been considered to be simply a form of N. duplicata, but it is now recognized as Neverita delessertiana.

== Distribution ==
This is a common western Atlantic species. It is found from Massachusetts and other parts of New England, south to Florida and other states on the Gulf of Mexico, south to Honduras.

== Description ==
The shell has a flattened globular shape, and reaches about 88 to 90 millimetres (3.5 to 3.5 in) in maximum dimension. The color of the shell is variable, but is often a greyish brown. The central apex of the shell is often a dark blue in fresh shells, which can make the shell somewhat resemble an eye. On the underside, there is a large brown callus which partly blocks the umbilicus of the shell.

The maximum recorded shell length is 82 mm.

== Habitat ==
This moon snail is found on sandy shores just below the low tide line. In most of its range, the empty shell is very commonly washed up on beaches, as also is the operculum and the sand collar.

The minimum recorded depth for this species is 0 m; the maximum recorded depth is 58 m.

== Feeding habits ==
The shark eye (like all moon snails) is predatory, feeding mainly on benthic bivalves. However, recent studies suggest that Neverita duplicata is omnivorous, likely grazing on algae. This snail drills a neat, "countersunk" circular hole through the shell of its prey species, and then feeds on the soft tissue within.

== Gallery ==
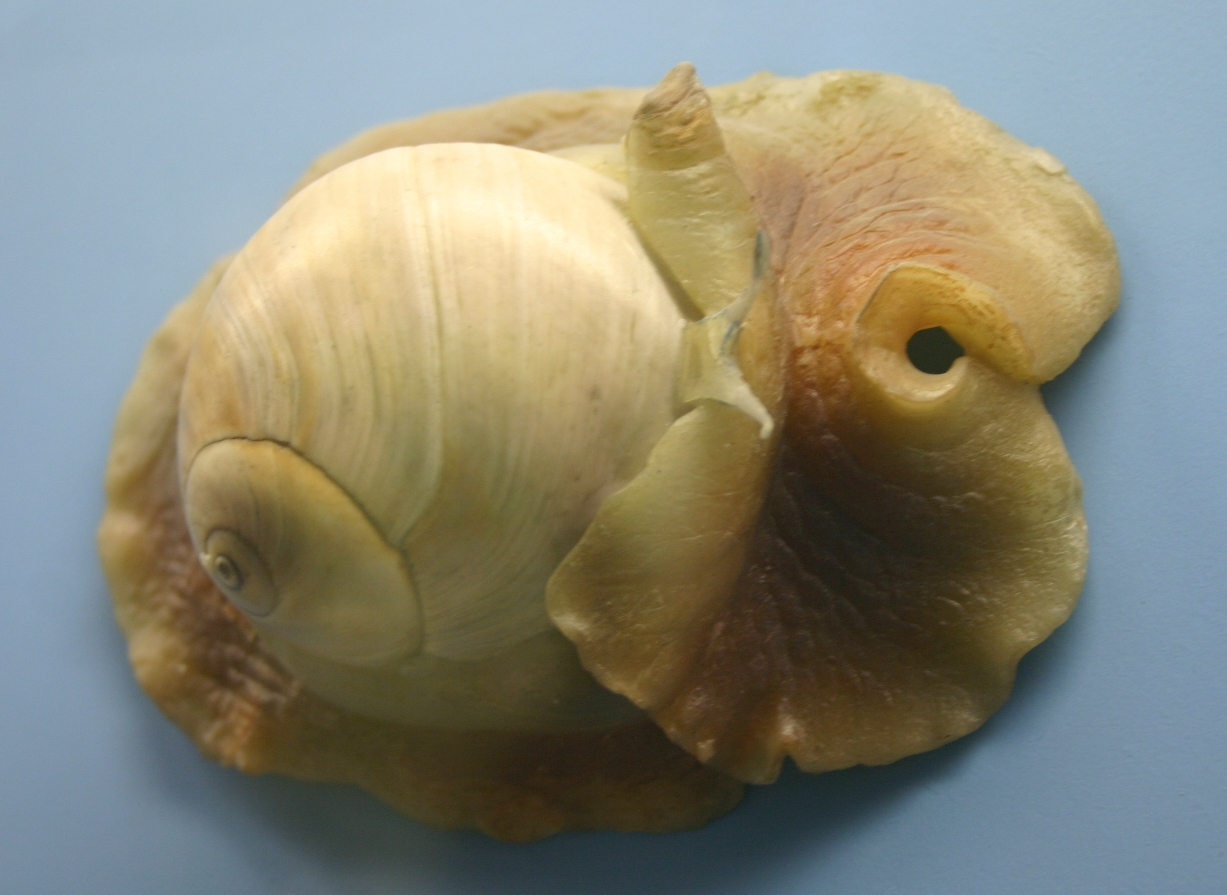
A model of a live individual of Neverita duplicata

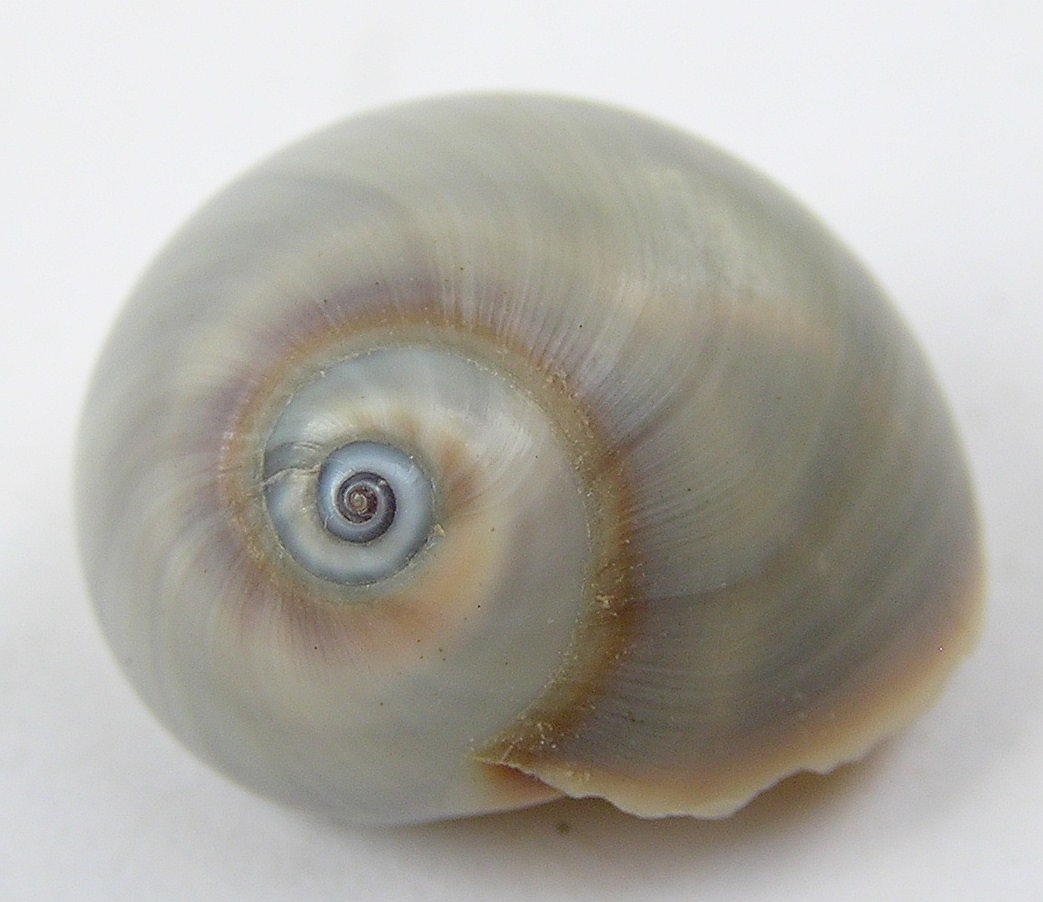
Apical view of Neverita duplicata

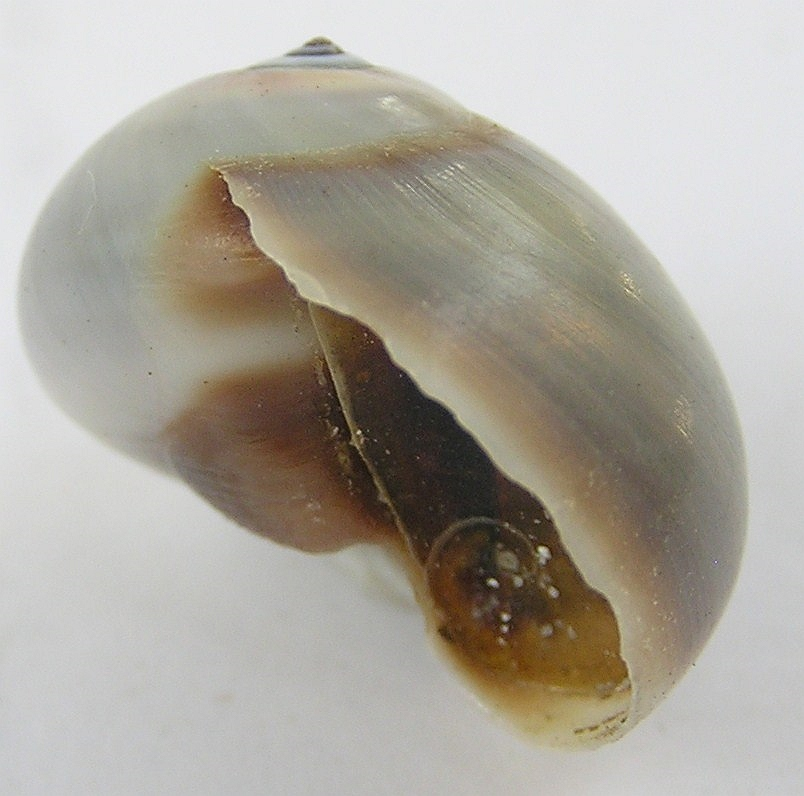
Lateral view of the same shell

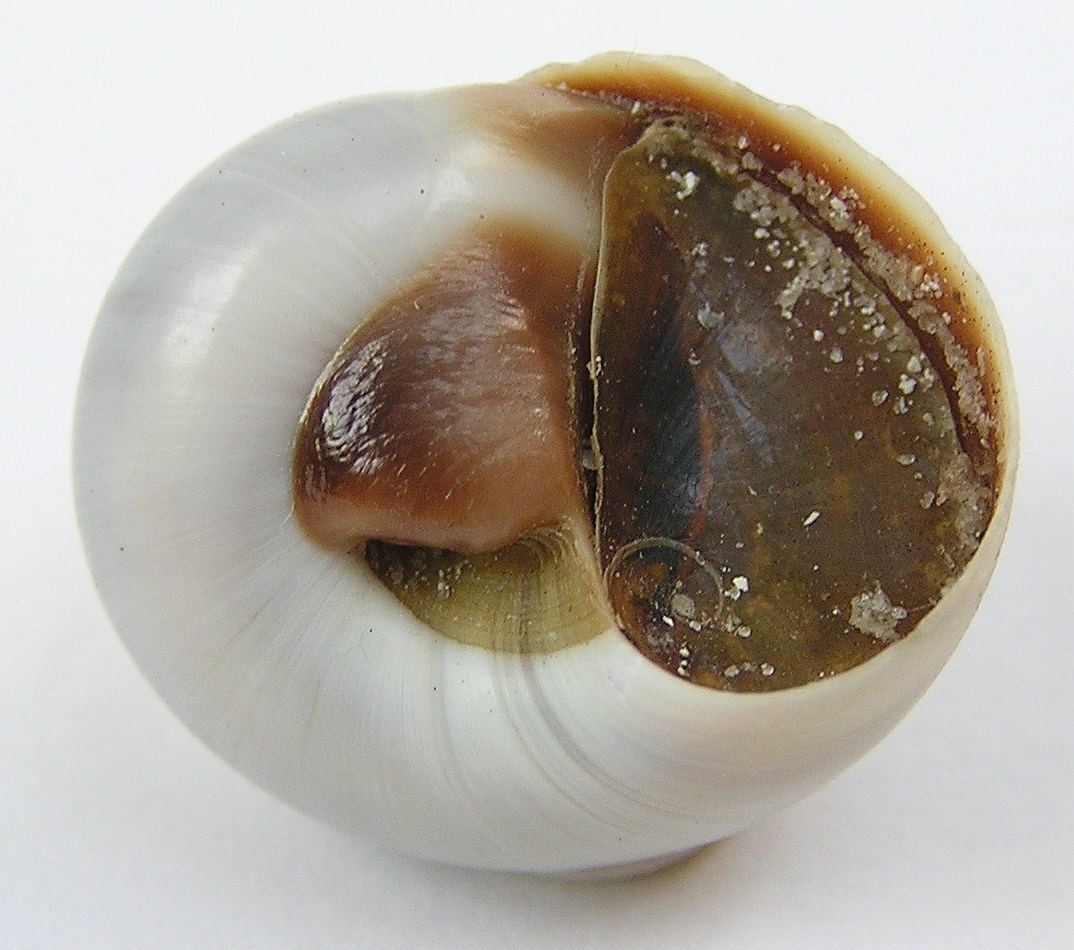
Umbilical view of the same shell

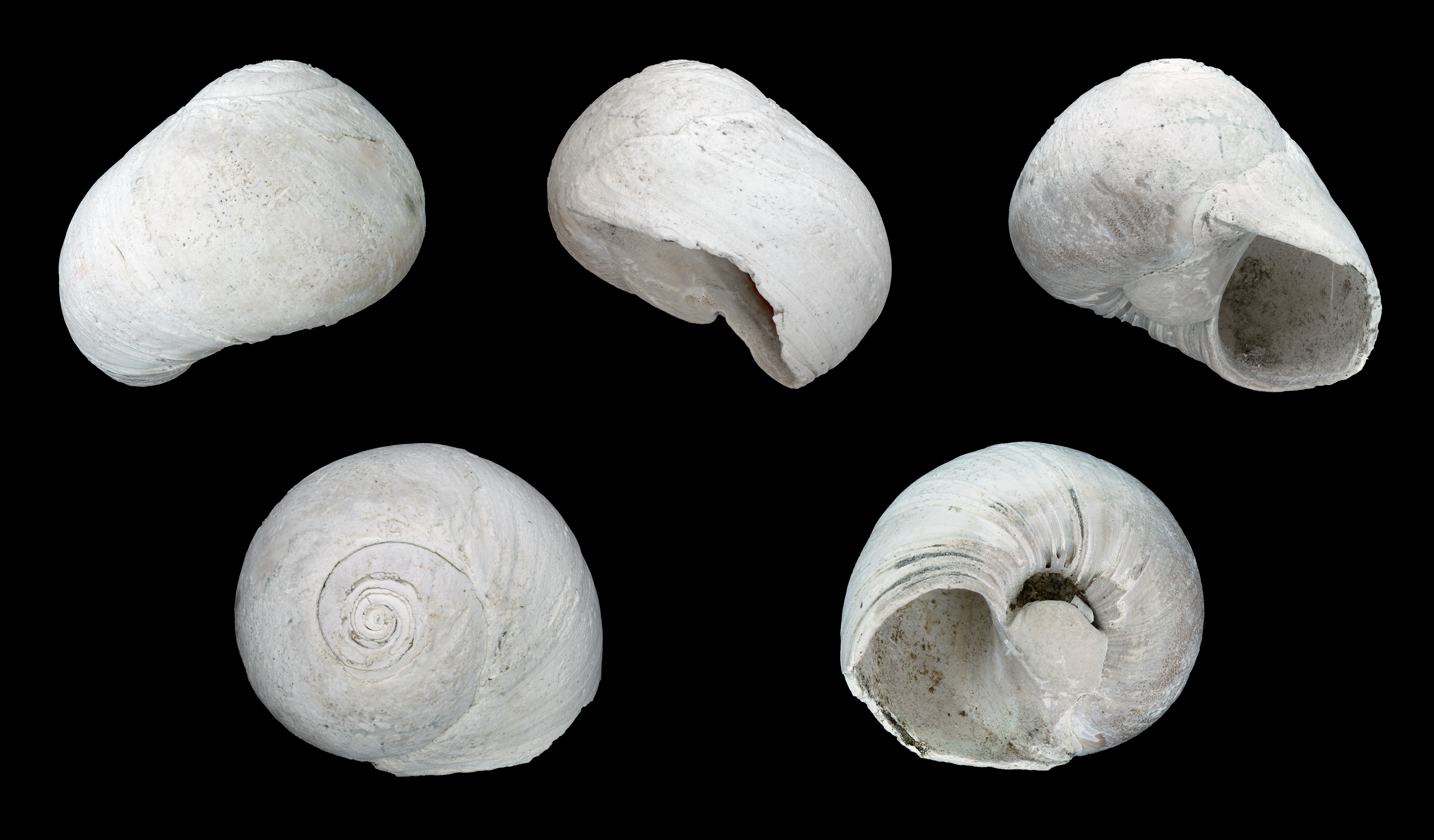
Fossil Neverita duplicata from the Pliocene of Florida
