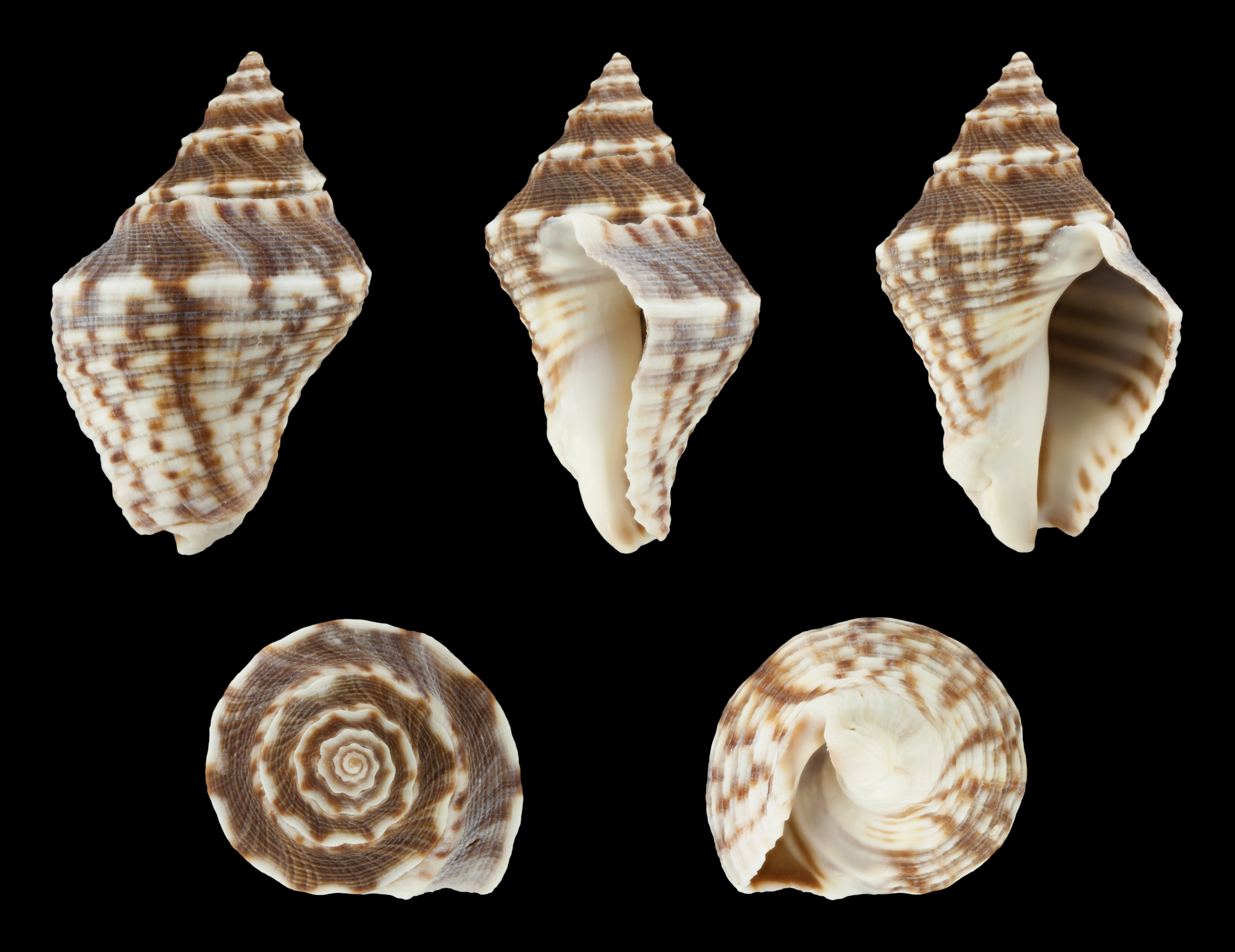

Scientific classification
- Kingdom: Animalia
- Phylum: Mollusca
- Class: Gastropoda
- Subclass: Caenogastropoda
- Order: Neogastropoda
- Superfamily: Muricoidea
- Family: Muricidae
- Subfamily: Rapaninae
- Genus: Indothais
- Species: I. gradata

Binomial name
- Indothais gradata (Jonas, 1846)

Synonyms
- Cymia carinifera var. simplex Schepman, 1919; Purpura (Cuma) gradata Jonas, 1846; Purpura grateloupiana Petit de la Saussaye, 1850; Purpura trigona Reeve, 1846; Thais (Thaisella) gradata (Jonas, 1846); Thaisella gradata (Jonas, 1846)

= Indothais gradata =

Species of gastropod

Indothais gradata is a species of sea snail, a marine gastropod mollusk, in the family Muricidae, the murex snails or rock snails.
