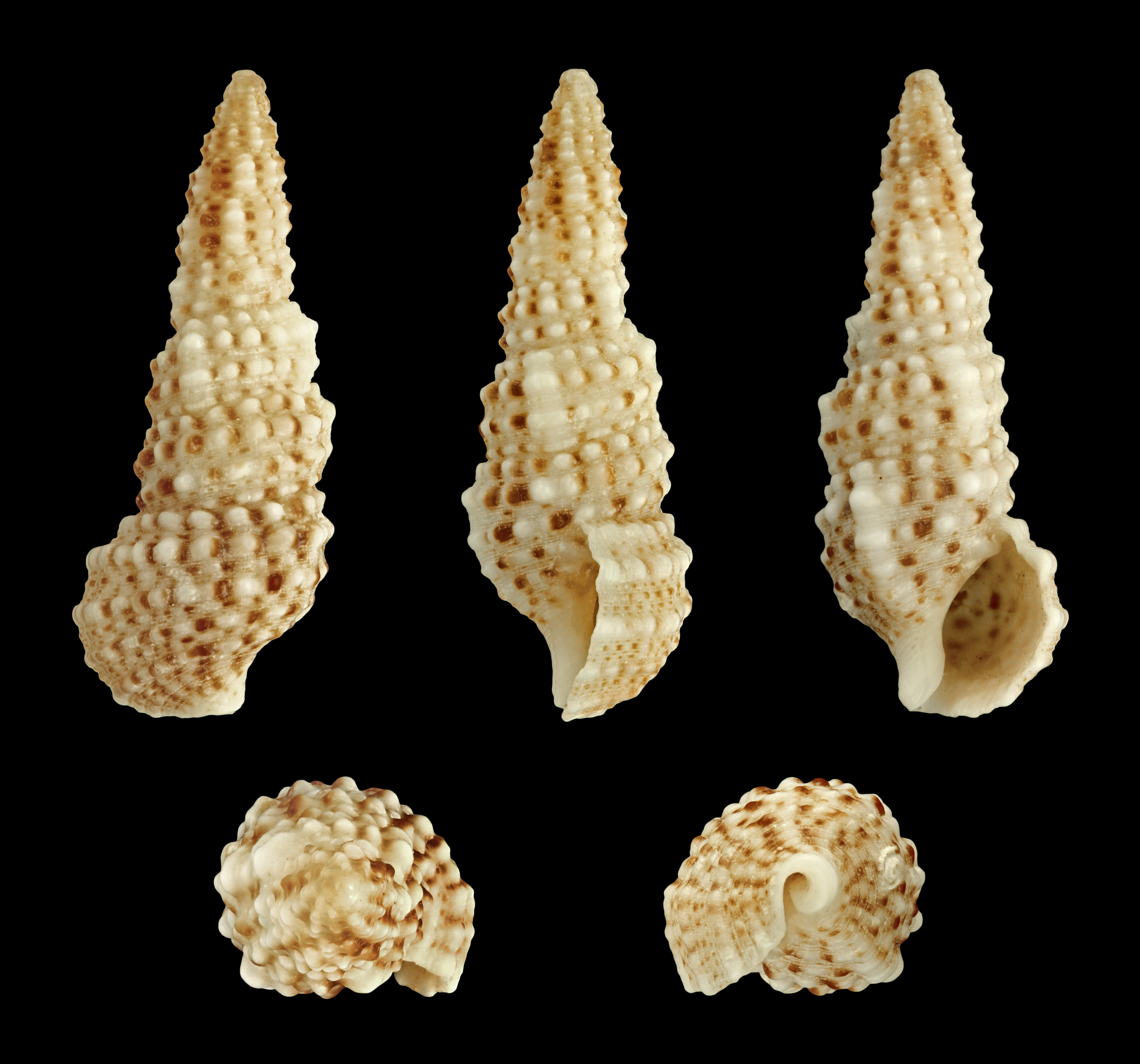

Scientific classification
- Kingdom: Animalia
- Phylum: Mollusca
- Class: Gastropoda
- Subclass: Caenogastropoda
- Order: incertae sedis
- Family: Cerithiidae
- Genus: Cerithium
- Species: C. scabridum

Binomial name
- Cerithium scabridum Philippi, 1848

Synonyms
- Cerithium (Thericium) scabridum Philippi, 1848; Cerithium (Thericium) yerburyi E.A. Smith, 1891; Cerithium adenense G.B. Sowerby II, 1865; Cerithium carnaticum Melvill & Standen, 1898; Cerithium levantinum Smith, E.A., 1891; Cerithium nigropunctatum G.B. Sowerby II, 1855; Cerithium scabridum adenensis (f) Sowerby, G.B. II, 1865; Cerithium scabridum albida Dautzenberg & Bouge, 1933; Cerithium scabridum carnatica (f) Melvill, J.C. & R. Standen, 1898; Cerithium scabridum var. djiboutiensis H. Fischer & Vignal in Fischer, 1901; Cerithium scabridum var. hispida Pallary, 1938; Cerithium scabridum hispidula (f) Pallary, P., 1938; Cerithium scabridum yerburyi (f) Smith, E.A., 1891; Cerithium yerburyi E.A. Smith, 1891; Gourmya (Gladiocerithium) argutum barashi Nordsieck, 1974

= Cerithium scabridum =

Species of gastropod

Cerithium scabridum is a species of sea snail, a marine gastropod mollusk in the family Cerithiidae.

== Description ==
The shell size varies between 10 mm and 25 mm.

== Distribution ==
This species is distributed in the Red Sea, the Persian Gulf, the Arabian Sea and the Mediterranean Sea.
