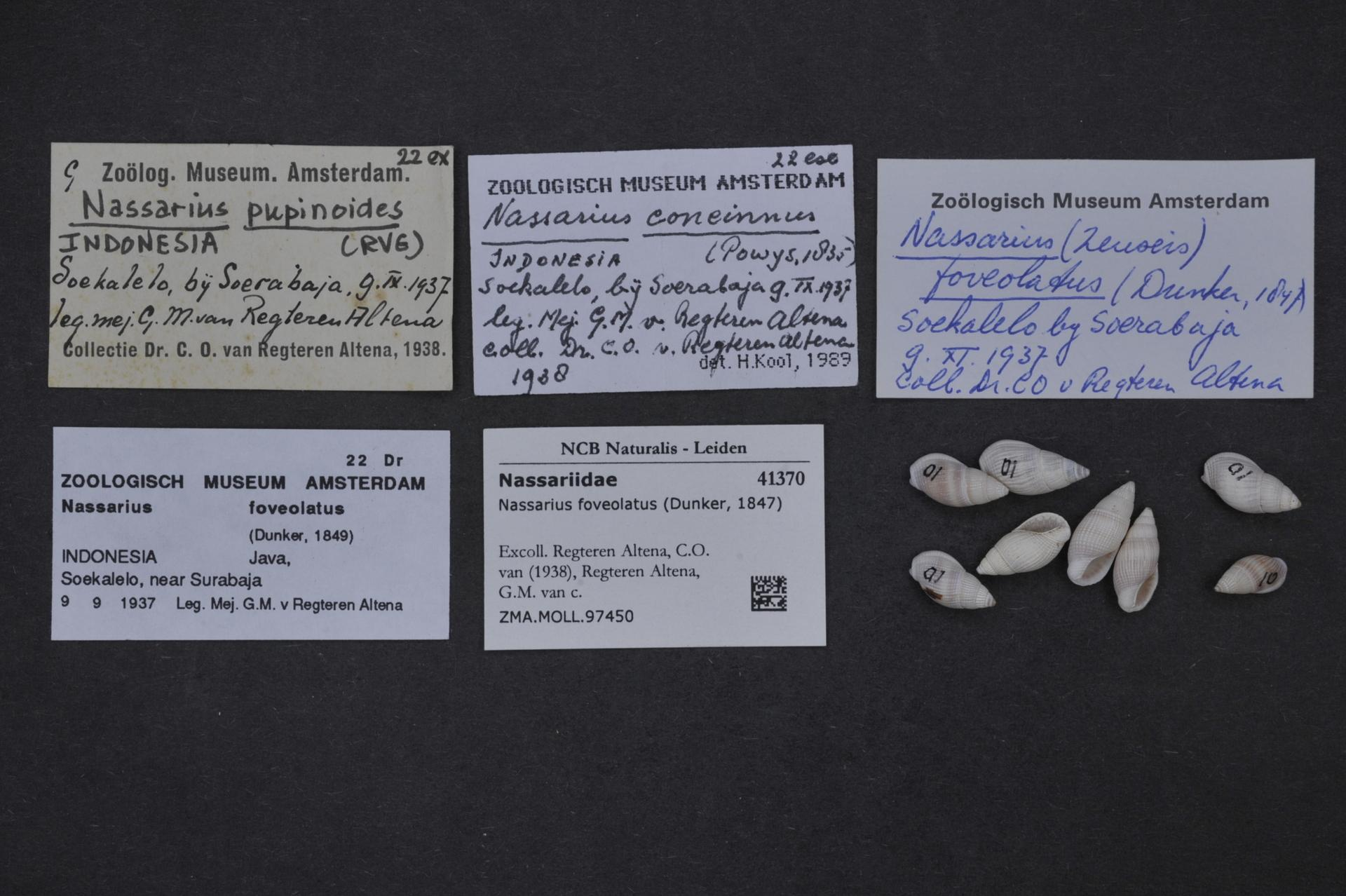
- Specimens of Nassarius foveolatus at Naturalis Biodiversity Center

Scientific classification
- Kingdom: Animalia
- Phylum: Mollusca
- Class: Gastropoda
- Subclass: Caenogastropoda
- Order: Neogastropoda
- Family: Nassariidae
- Subfamily: Nassariinae
- Genus: Nassarius
- Species: N. foveolatus

Binomial name
- Nassarius foveolatus (Dunker, 1847)

Synonyms
- Buccinum foveolatum Dunker, 1847 (original combination); Nassa foveolata (Dunker, 1847); Nassa labida Reeve, 1854; Nassa planocostata A. Adams, 1852; Nassarius (Zeuxis) foveolatus (Dunker, 1847); Nassarius (Zeuxis) semiplicatoides A.-J. Zhang & Z.-J. You, 2007; Nassarius planocostatus (A. Adams, 1852); Nassarius semiplicatoides A.-J. Zhang & Z.-J. You, 2007

= Nassarius foveolatus =

Species of gastropod

Nassarius semiplicatoides is a species of sea snail, a marine gastropod mollusk in the family Nassariidae, the nassa mud snails or dog whelks.
