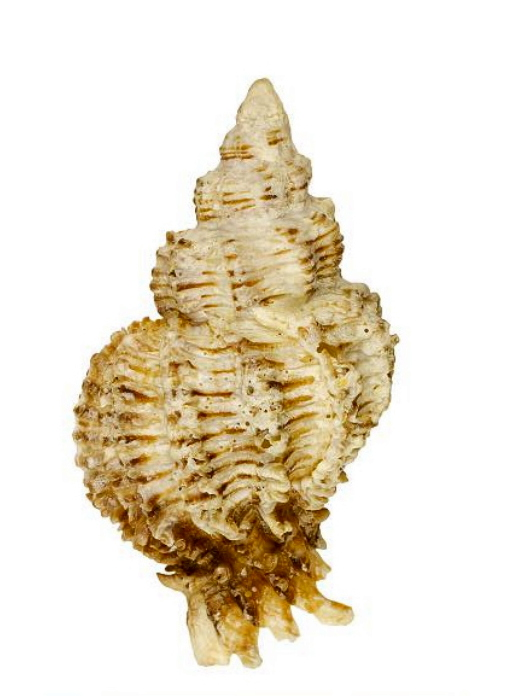

Scientific classification
- Kingdom: Animalia
- Phylum: Mollusca
- Class: Gastropoda
- Subclass: Caenogastropoda
- Order: Neogastropoda
- Superfamily: Muricoidea
- Family: Muricidae
- Subfamily: Rapaninae
- Genus: Indothais
- Species: I. blanfordi

Binomial name
- Indothais blanfordi (Melvill, 1893)

Synonyms
- Purpura (Stramonita) blanfordi Melvill, 1893; Purpura blanfordi Melvill, 1893; Purpura pura E. A. Smith, 1903; Thais (Thaisella) blanfordi (Melvill, 1893); Thaisella blanfordi (Melvill, 1893)

= Indothais blanfordi =

Species of sea snail

Indothais blanfordi is a species of sea snail, a marine gastropod mollusk, in the family Muricidae, the murex snails or rock snails.
