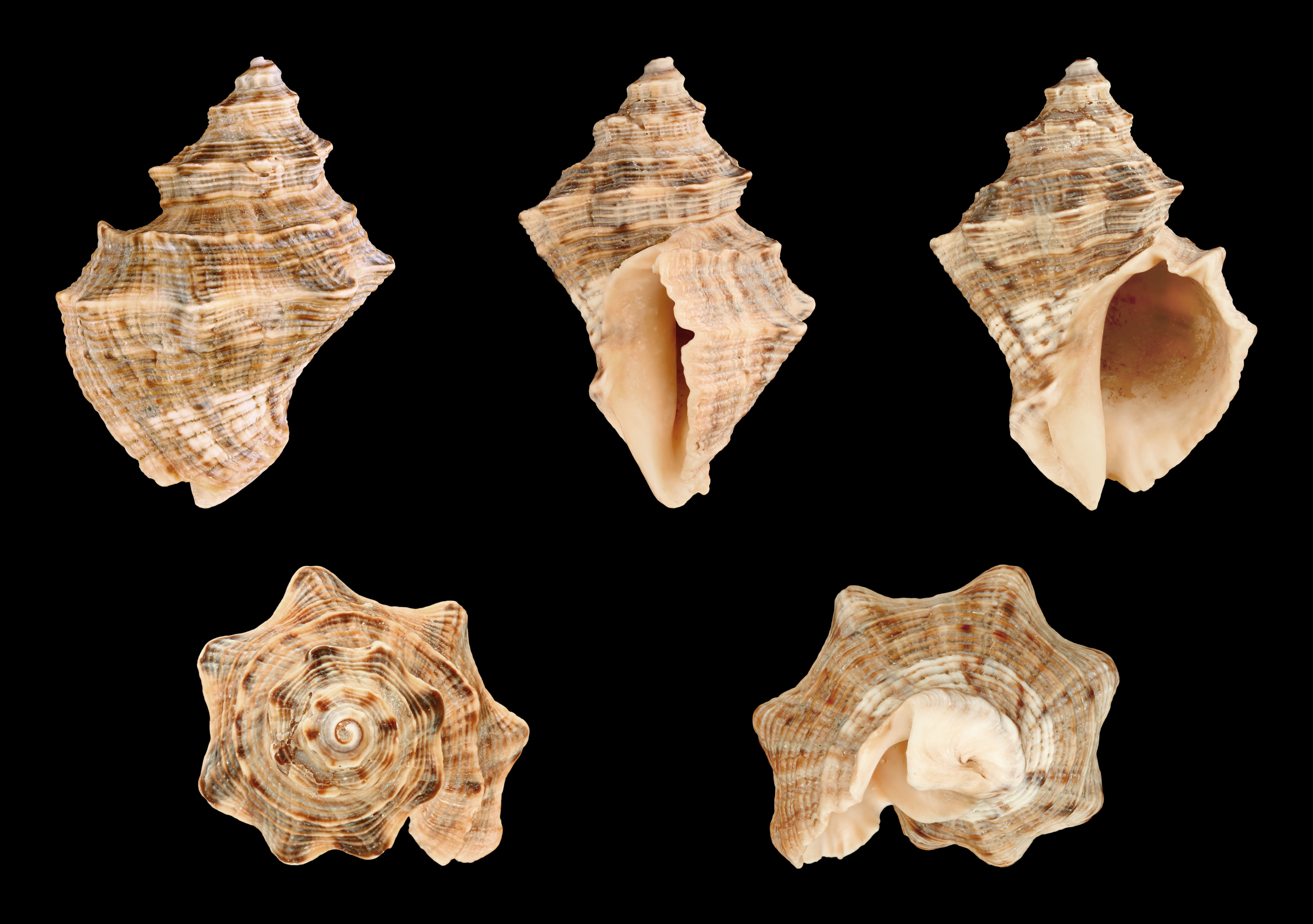
- Indothais lacera shell

Scientific classification
- Kingdom: Animalia
- Phylum: Mollusca
- Class: Gastropoda
- Subclass: Caenogastropoda
- Order: Neogastropoda
- Family: Muricidae
- Genus: Indothais
- Species: I. lacera

Binomial name
- Indothais lacera (Born, 1778)

Synonyms
- Cymia carinifera (Lamarck, 1822); Mancinella mutabilis Link, 1807; Murex lacera Born, 1778; Purpura carinata Schubert & Wagner, 1829; Purpura carinifera Lamarck, 1822; Purpura scalaris Schubert & Wagner, 1829; Purpura umbilicata Jenkins, 1864; Thais carinifera; Thais (Thaisella) lacera (Born, 1778) (alternate representation); Thais lacera (Von Born, 1778); Thais (Thais) mutabilis Link, H.F., 1807; Thaisella lacera (Born, 1778); Thaisella mutabilis (Link, 1807)

= Indothais lacera =

Species of gastropod

Indothais lacera is a species of sea snail, a marine gastropod mollusk in the family Muricidae, the murex snails or rock snails.

== Description ==
The size of an adult shell varies between 30 mm and 57 mm.

== Distribution ==
This species occurs in the Indian Ocean off South Africa, in the Red Sea, in the Mediterranean Sea and in the Pacific Ocean off Southeast Asia.
