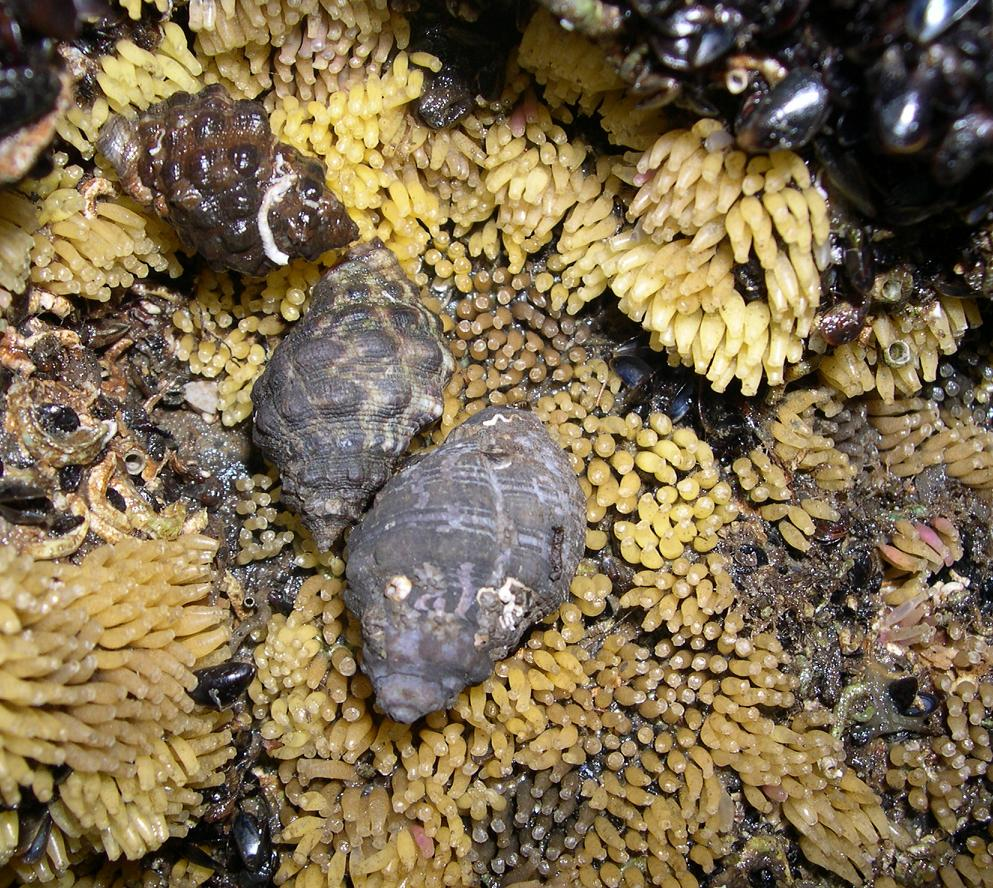
- A pair of Thais clavigera with many egg masses

Scientific classification
- Kingdom: Animalia
- Phylum: Mollusca
- Class: Gastropoda
- Subclass: Caenogastropoda
- Order: Neogastropoda
- Superfamily: Muricoidea
- Family: Muricidae
- Subfamily: Rapaninae
- Genus: Thais; Röding, 1798

Synonyms
- Thais (Thais) Röding, 1798

= Thais (gastropod) =

Genus of gastropods

Thais, sometimes known by the common names dog winkles or rock shells, is a genus of medium to large predatory sea snails with an operculum, marine gastropod molluscs in the family Muricidae.

== Species ==
Species within the genus Thais include:

- Thais ambustulata Hedley, 1912
- Thais dayunensis Z.-Y. Chen & Z.-J. You, 2009
- † Thais demissa Finlay, 1930
- Thais nodosa (Linnaeus, 1758)
- Thais pseudodiadema (Yokoyama, 1928)
- Thais tricolorata Bozzetti, 2010

== Synonyms ==
- Thais aculeata Deshayes & Milne-Edwards, 1844: synonym of Tylothais aculeata (Deshayes, 1844)
- Thais alouina (Röding, 1798): synonym of Mancinella alouina (Röding, 1798)
- Thais aperta Blainville, 1832: synonym of Drupa aperta (Blainville, 1832)
- Thais bimaculata (Jonas, 1845): synonym of Menathais bimaculata (Jonas, 1845)
- Thais bitubercularis (Lamarck, 1822): synonym of Reishia bitubercularis (Lamarck, 1822)
- Thais blanfordi (Melvill, 1893): synonym of Indothais blanfordi (Melvill, 1893)
- Thais bronni (Dunker, 1860): synonym of Reishia bronni (Dunker, 1860)
- Thais callaoensis (Gray, 1828): synonym of Acanthais callaoensis (J. E. Gray, 1828) (superseded combination)
- Thais callifera (Lamarck, 1822): synonym of Thaisella callifera (Lamarck, 1822)
- Thais carinifera: synonym of Thais lacera (Born, 1778)
- Thais chocolata (Duclos, 1832): synonym of Thaisella chocolata (P.L. Duclos, 1832)
- Thais clavigera Köster, 1858: synonym of Reishia clavigera (Küster, 1860)
- Thais coronata (Lamarck, 1816): synonym of Thaisella coronata (Lamarck, 1816)
- Thais delessertiana (D'Orbigny, 1841): synonym of Stramonita delessertiana (d'Orbigny, 1841)
- Thais deltoidea (Lamarck, 1822) - deltoid rocksnail: synonym of Vasula deltoidea (Lamarck, 1822)
- Thais dubia (Schepman, 1922): synonym of Indothais dubia (Schepman, 1919)
- Thais echinata (Blainville, 1832): synonym of Mancinella echinata (Blainville, 1832)
- Thais echinulata (Lamarck, 1822): synonym of Mancinella echinulata (Lamarck, 1822)
- Thais emarginata (Deshayes, 1839): synonym of Nucella emarginata (Deshayes, 1839)
- Thais gemmulata: synonym of Thais (Mancinella) alouina (Röding, 1798)
- Thais gradata (Jonas, 1846): synonym of Indothais gradata (Jonas, 1846)
- Thais grandis (Sowerby, 1835): synonym of Neorapana grandis (Sowerby I, 1835)
- Thais grossa Houart, 2001: synonym of Mancinella grossa (Houart, 2001) (basionym)
- Thais haemastoma (Linnaeus, 1758): synonym of Stramonita haemastoma (Linnaeus, 1767)
- Thais herberti Houart, 1998: synonym of Mancinella herberti (Houart, 1998) (basionym)
- Thais hippocastanum (Linnaeus, 1758): synonym of Thais (Thalessa) virgata (Dillwyn, 1817)
- Thais intermedia (Kiener, 1835): synonym of Menathais intermedia (Kiener, 1835)
- Thais javanica (Philippi, 1848): synonym of Indothais javanica (Philippi, 1848)
- Thais jubilaea Tan & Sigurdsson, 1990: synonym of Reishia jubilaea (K.-S. Tan & Sigurdsson, 1990): synonym of Reishia luteostoma (Holten, 1802)
- Thais keluo Tan & Liu, 2001: synonym of Reishia keluo (K.-S. Tan & L.-L. Liu, 2001)
- Thais kiosquiformis (Duclos, 1832): synonym of Thaisella kiosquiformis (Duclos, 1832)
- Thais lacera (Born, 1778): synonym of Indothais lacera (Born, 1778)
- Thais lamellosa (Gmelin, 1791): synonym of Nucella lamellosa (Gmelin, 1791)
- Thais langi Clench & Turner, 1948: synonym of Thaisella forbesii (Dunker, 1853)
- Thais lapillus Linnaeus, 1758 - the dog whelk: synonym of Nucella lapillus (Linnaeus, 1758)
- Thais lata (Kuroda, 1931): synonym of Mancinella lata (Kuroda, 1931)
- Thais luteostoma Holton, 1803: synonym of Reishia luteostoma (Holten, 1802)
- Thais malayensis Tan & Sigurdsson, 1996: synonym of Indothais malayensis (Tan & Sigurdsson, 1996)
- Thais mancinella Linnaeus: synonym of Mancinella alouina (Röding, 1798)
- Thais mariae Morettes, 1954: synonym of Thaisella mariae (Morretes, 1954) (basionym)
- Thais marmorata (Pease, 1865): synonym of Mancinella marmorata (Pease, 1865)
- Thais melones (Duclos, 1832): synonym of Vasula melones (Duclos, 1832)
- Thais muricata (Broderip, 1832): synonym of Neorapana muricata (Broderip, 1832)
- Thais orbita (Gmelin, 1791) - White rock shell: synonym of Dicathais orbita (Gmelin, 1791)
- Thais pica Blainville: synonym of Thais (Thalessa) tuberosa (Röding, 1798)
- Thais pinangensis Tan & Sigurdsson, 1996: synonym of Indothais pinangensis (K. S. Tan & Sigurdsson, 1996)
- Thais rufotincta Tan & Sigurdsson, 1996: synonym of Indothais rufotincta (K. S. Tan & Sigurdsson, 1996)
- Thais rustica (Lamarck, 1822) Rustic rocksnail: synonym of Stramonita rustica (Lamarck, 1822)
- Thais sacellum (Gmelin, 1791): synonym of Indothais sacellum (Gmelin, 1791)
- Thais savignyi (Deshayes, 1844): synonym of Thalessa savignyi (Deshayes, 1844); synonym of Tylothais savignyi (Deshayes, 1844)
- Thais siro Kuroda, 1931: synonym of Mancinella siro (Kuroda, 1931)
- Thais speciosa (Valenciennes, 1832): synonym of Vasula speciosa (Valenciennes, 1832)
- Thais stellata Röding, 1798: synonym of Stramonita haemastoma (Linnaeus, 1767)
- Thais tissoti (Petit, 1852): synonym of Semiricinula tissoti (Petit de la Saussaye, 1852)
- Thais triangularis (Blainville, 1832): synonym of Acanthais triangularis (Blainville, 1832)
- Thais trinitatensis (Guppy, 1869): synonym of Thaisella trinitatensis (Guppy, 1869) (superseded combination)
- Thais tuberculata (Sowerby, 1835): synonym of Neorapana tuberculata (Sowerby I, 1835)
- Thais tuberosa (Röding, 1798): synonym of Menathais tuberosa (Röding, 1798)
- Thais tumulosa (Reeve, 1846): synonym of Thalessa tumulosa (Reeve, 1846): synonym of Thaisella tumulosa (Reeve, 1846)
- Thais undata Lamarck: synonym of Reishia bitubercularis (Lamarck, 1822)
- Thais virgata (Dillwyn, 1817): synonym of Tylothais virgata (Dillwyn, 1817)
- Thais woodwardi (Roxo, 1924): synonym of † Melongena woodwardi (Roxo, 1924) - from Miocene of the Pebas Formation
- Thais wutingi Tan, 1997: synonym of Indothais wutingi (Tan, 1997) (original combination)
