= T. intermedia =

T. intermedia may refer to:

- Terminalia intermedia (disambiguation), several species of tropical tree
- Thais intermedia, a sea snail species
- Tillandsia intermedia, a plant species
- Trialeurodes intermedia, a whitefly species
- Triplophysa intermedia, a ray-finned fish species
- Tristramella intermedia, an extinct fish species that was endemic to Israel
- Trypeta intermedia, a fruit fly species
- Typhula intermedia, a synonym for Typhula variabilis, a plant pathogen species

== See also ==
- Intermedia (disambiguation)
