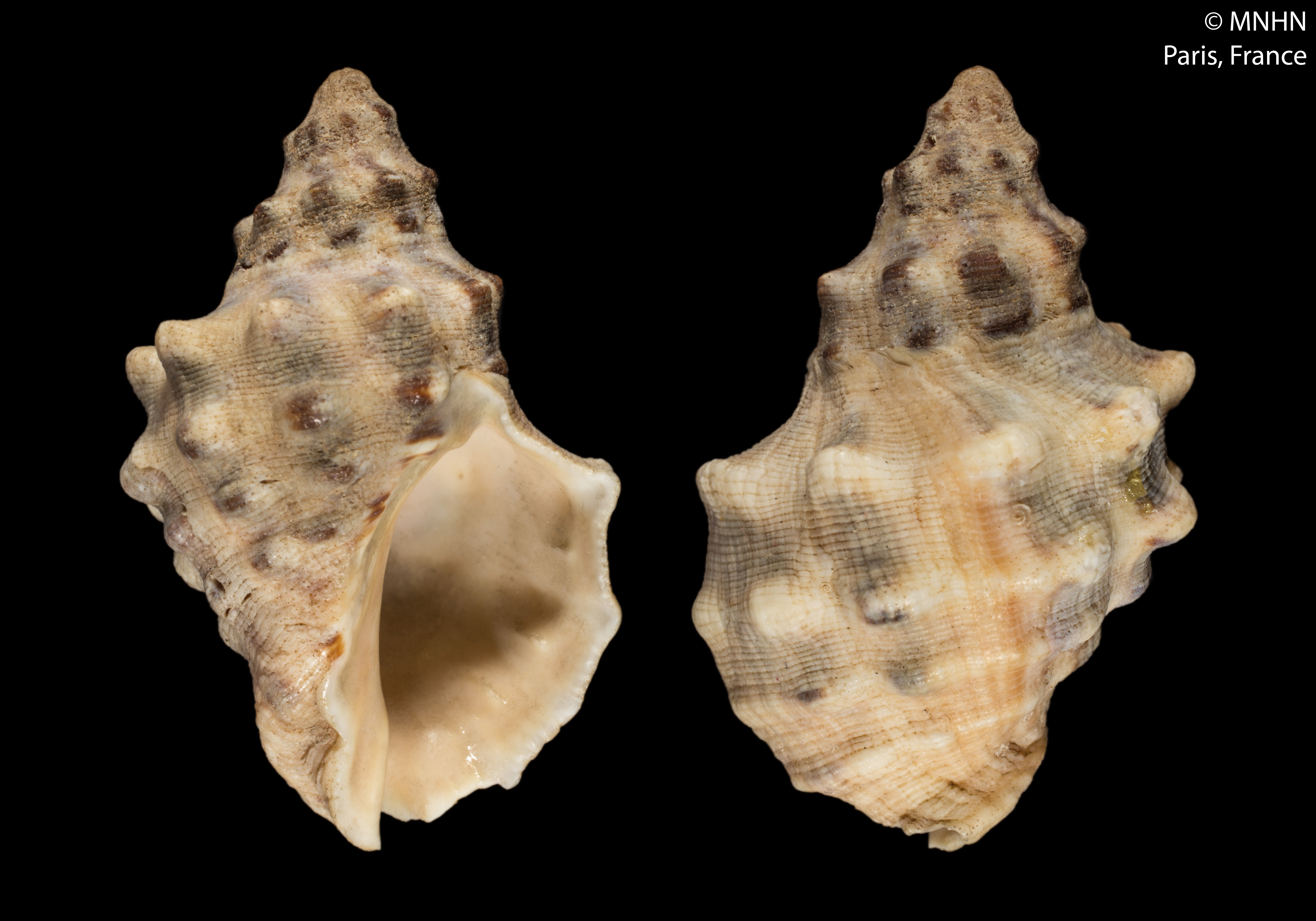
- Shell of Reishia luteostoma (syntype at MNHN, Paris)

Scientific classification
- Kingdom: Animalia
- Phylum: Mollusca
- Class: Gastropoda
- Subclass: Caenogastropoda
- Order: Neogastropoda
- Superfamily: Muricoidea
- Family: Muricidae
- Subfamily: Rapaninae
- Genus: Reishia; Kuroda & Habe, 1971

Type species
- Purpura bronni Dunker, 1860

Synonyms
- Thais (Reishia) Kuroda & Habe, 1971

= Reishia =

Genus of gastropods

Reishia is a genus of sea snails, marine gastropod molluscs in the family Muricidae, the murex snails or rock snails.

== Species ==
Species within the genus Reishia include:

- Reishia bitubercularis (Lamarck, 1822)
- Reishia clavigera (Küster, 1860)
- Reishia keluo (K.-S. Tan & L.-L. Liu, 2001)
- Reishia luteostoma (Holten, 1802)
- Reishia okutanii Thach, 2016
- Reishia problematica (Baker, 1891)

Synonyms

- Reishia armigera (Link, 1807): synonym of Mancinella armigera Link, 1807
- Reishia bronni (Dunker, 1860): synonym of Reishia luteostoma (Holten, 1802) (junior subjective synonym)
- Reishia capensis (Petit, 1852): synonym of Mancinella capensis (Petit de la Saussaye, 1852)
- Reishia jubilaea (K.-S. Tan & Sigurdsson, 1990): synonym of Reishia luteostoma (Holten, 1802) (unaccepted > junior subjective synonym)
- Reishia pseudodiadema (Yokoyama, 1928): synonym of Thais pseudodiadema (Yokoyama, 1928)
