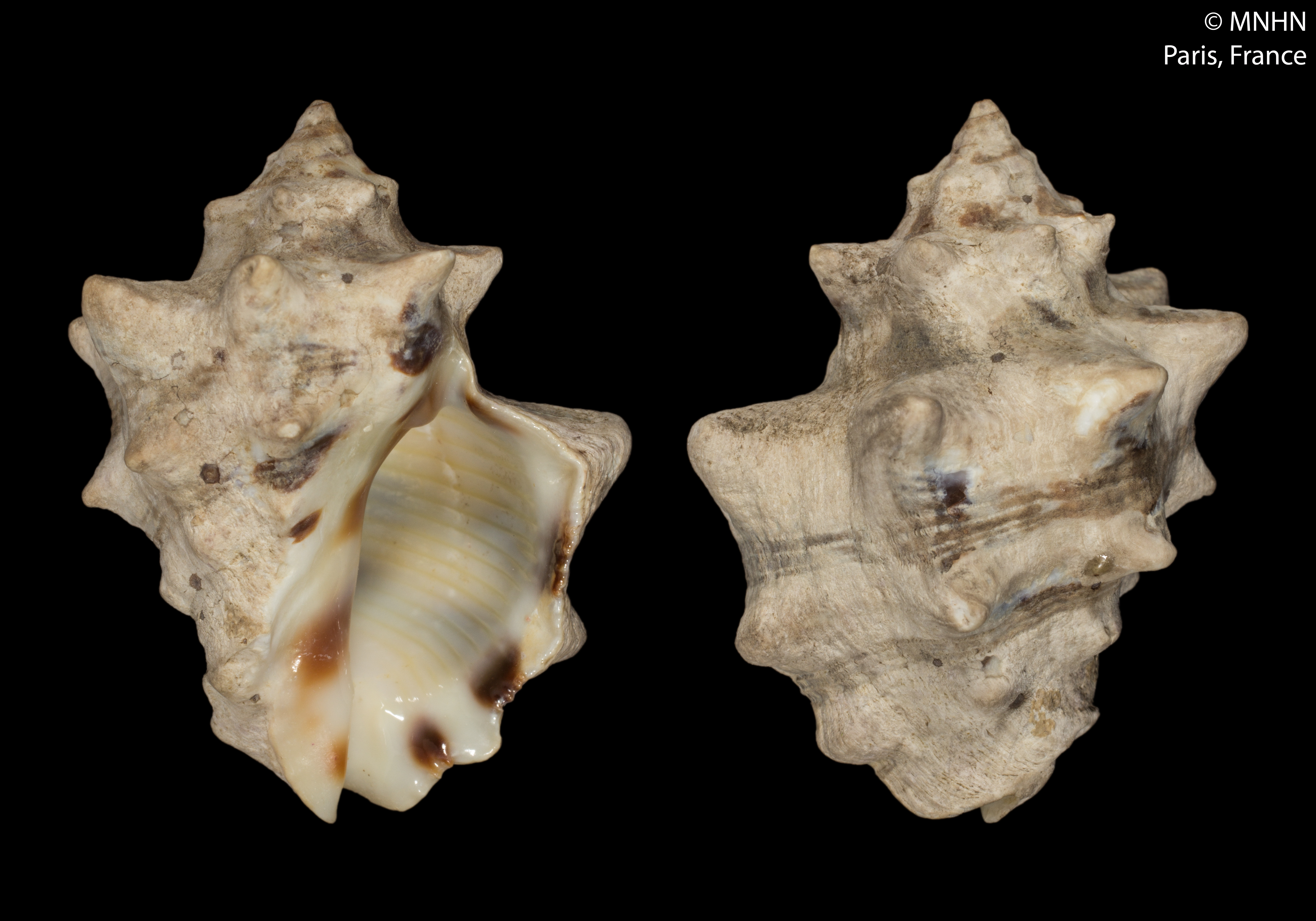
- Shell of Menathais tuberosa (syntype at MNHN, Paris)

Scientific classification
- Kingdom: Animalia
- Phylum: Mollusca
- Class: Gastropoda
- Subclass: Caenogastropoda
- Order: Neogastropoda
- Superfamily: Muricoidea
- Family: Muricidae
- Subfamily: Rapaninae
- Genus: Menathais; Iredale, 1937

Type species
- Purpura pica Blainville, 1832

= Menathais =

Genus of gastropods

Menathais is a genus of sea snails, marine gastropod mollusks, in the family Muricidae, the murex snails or rock snails.

== Species ==
Species within the genus Menathais include:

- Menathais bimaculata (Jonas, 1845)
- Menathais intermedia (Kiener, 1836)
- Menathais tuberosa (Röding, 1798)
- † Menathais viciani Kovács, 2018
