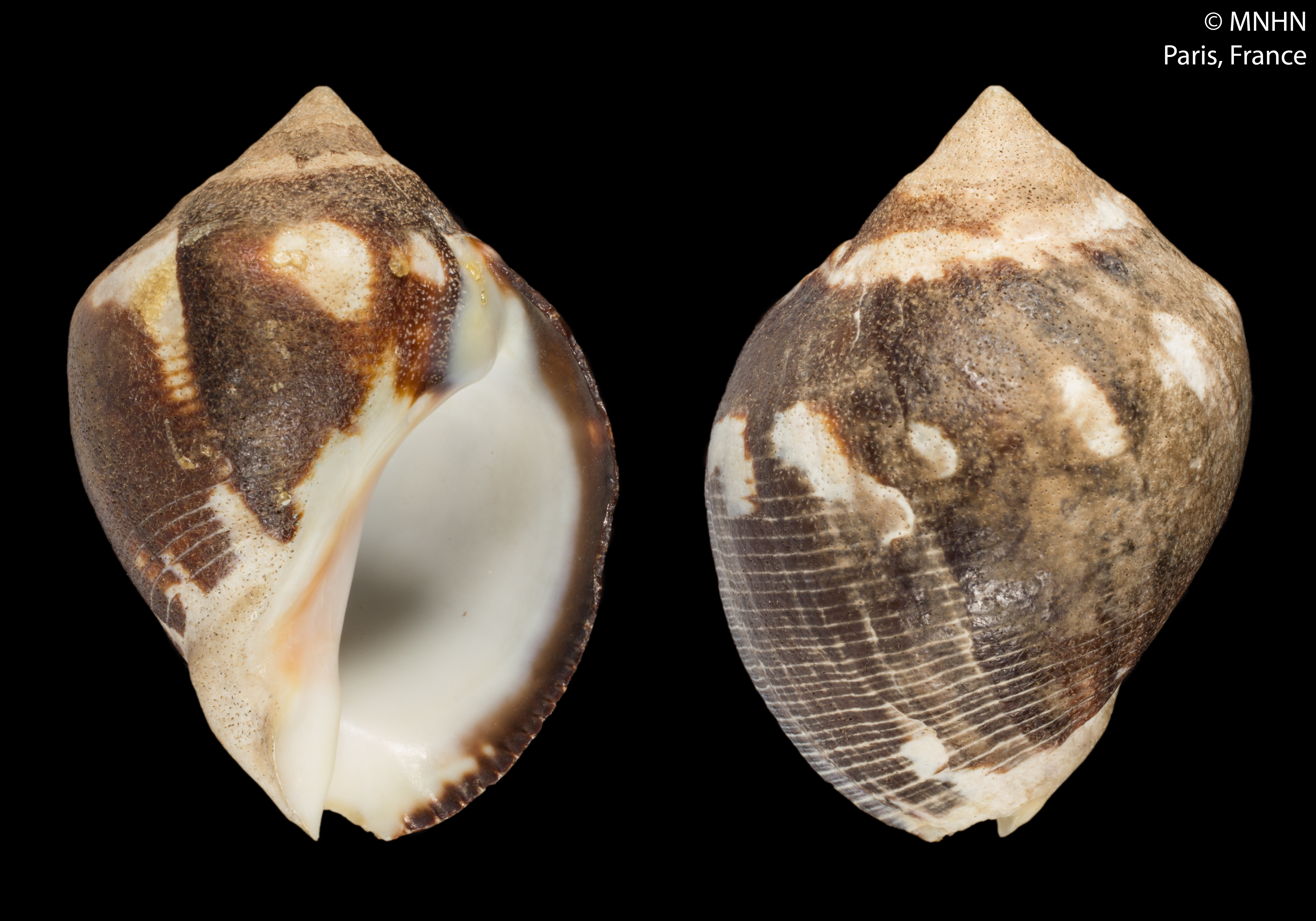
- Shell of Vasula melones

Scientific classification
- Kingdom: Animalia
- Phylum: Mollusca
- Class: Gastropoda
- Subclass: Caenogastropoda
- Order: Neogastropoda
- Superfamily: Muricoidea
- Family: Muricidae
- Genus: Vasula; Mörch, 1860

Type species
- Purpura melones Duclos, 1832

Synonyms
- Purpura (Vasula) Mörch, 1860 (original rank); Thais (Vasula) Mörch, 1860

= Vasula (gastropod) =

Genus of gastropods

Vasula is a genus of sea snails, marine gastropod mollusks in the family Muricidae, the murex snails or rock snails.

== Species ==
- Vasula deltoidea (Lamarck, 1822)
- Vasula melones (Duclos, 1832)
- Vasula speciosa (Valenciennes, 1832)
