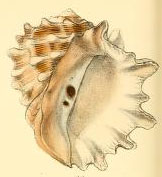
- Thais nodosa (Lovell Augustus Reeve, 1843. Conchologia iconica, or, Illustrations of the shells of molluscous animals)

Scientific classification
- Kingdom: Animalia
- Phylum: Mollusca
- Class: Gastropoda
- Subclass: Caenogastropoda
- Order: Neogastropoda
- Family: Muricidae
- Genus: Thais
- Species: T. nodosa

Binomial name
- Thais nodosa (Linnaeus, 1758)

Synonyms
- Murex fucus Gmelin, 1791; Murex neritoideus Linnaeus, 1767; Nerita nodosa Linnaeus, 1758; Purpura ascensionis Blainville, 1832; Purpura neritoides Lamarck, 1822; Thais lena Röding, 1798; Thais meretricula Röding, 1798; Thais nodosa (Linnaeus, 1758); Purpura nodosaLinnaeus, 1758

= Thais nodosa =

Species of gastropod

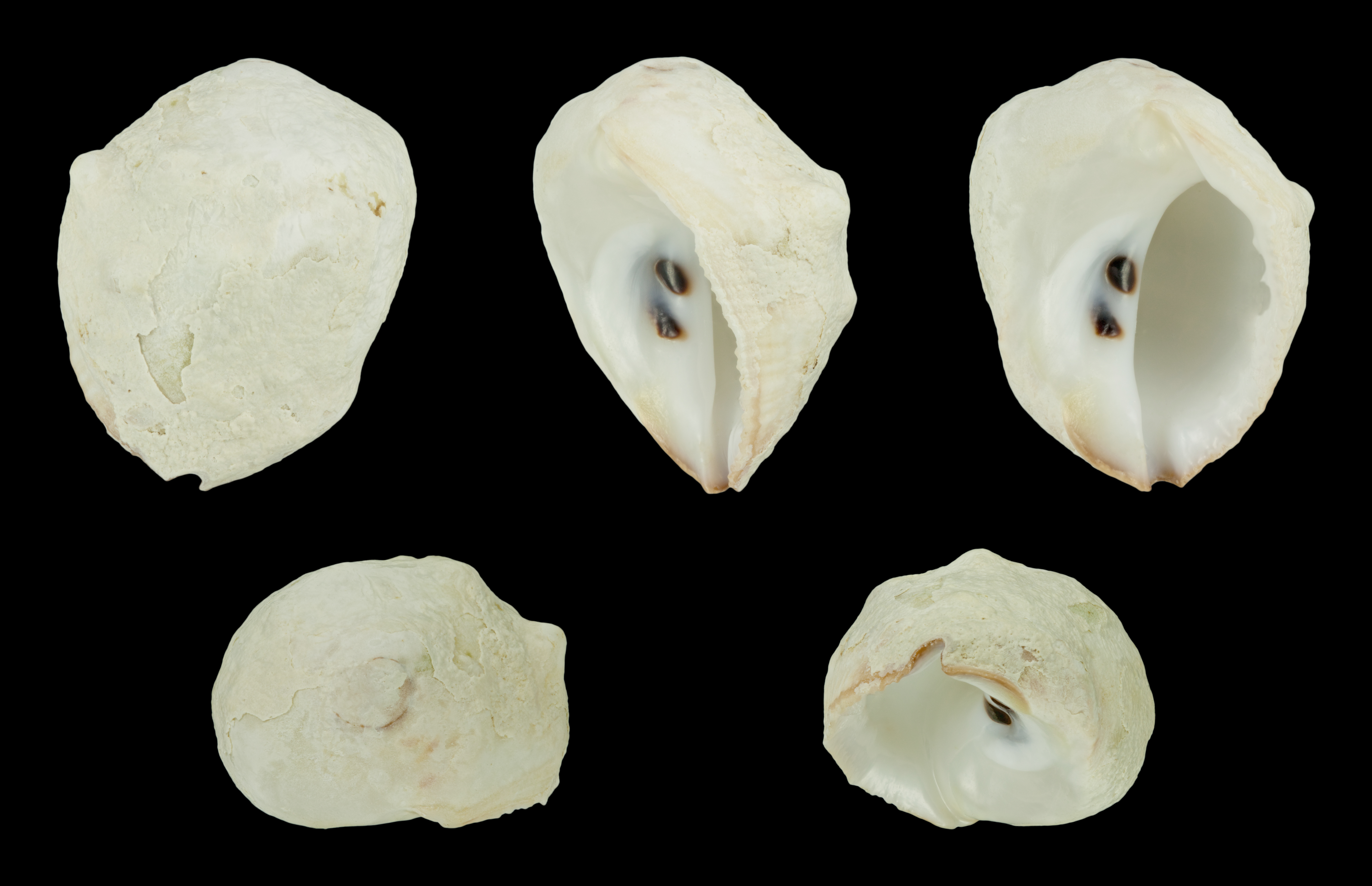

Thais nodosa also known as nodose purpura is a species of medium-sized sea snail, a marine gastropod mollusc in the family Muricidae, the murex snails or rock snails.

== Description ==
The length of the shell attains 45 mm (1.8 in).

== Distribution ==
Inhabits rocky shores of Brazil and western Africa, (Cape Verde).
