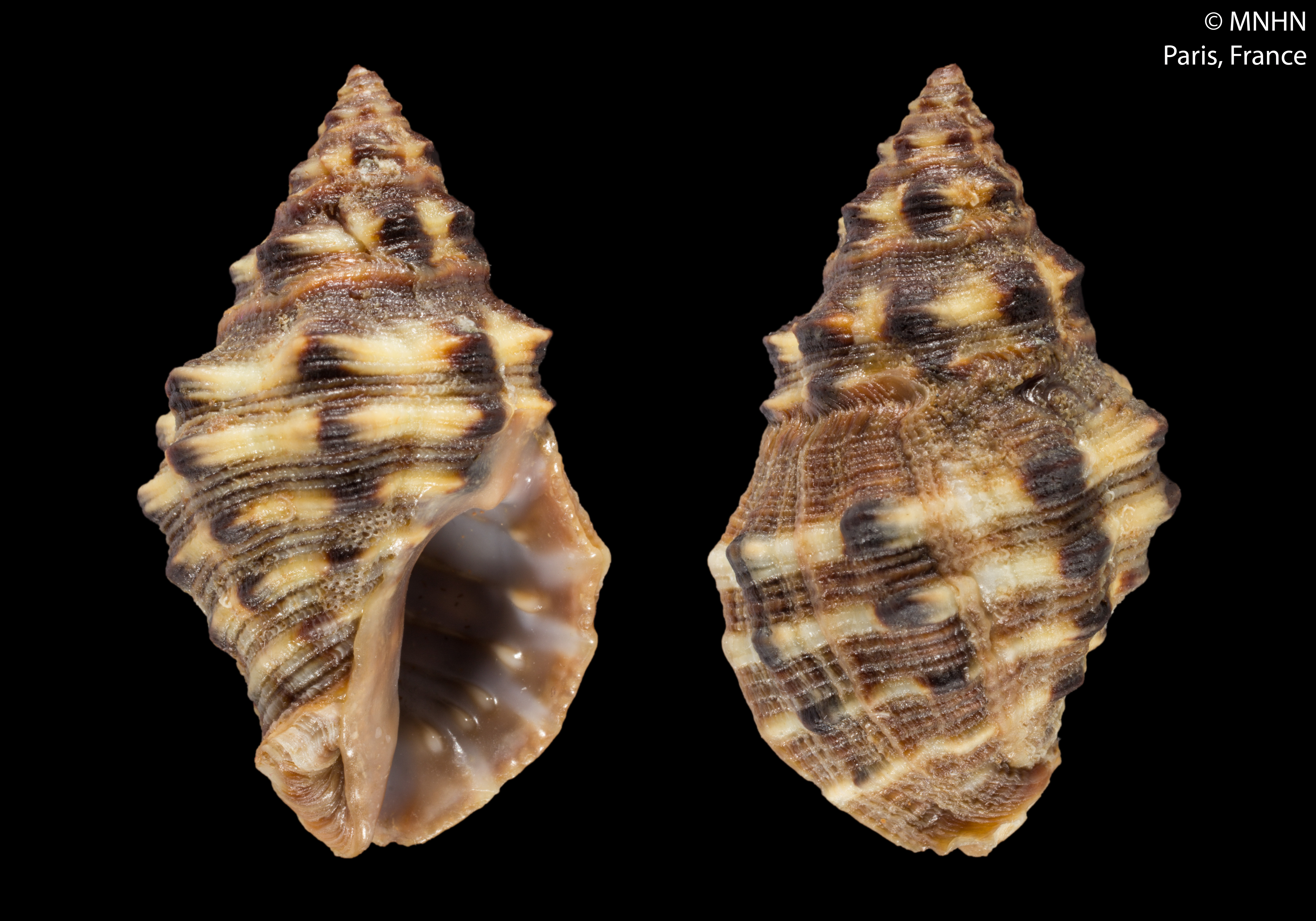

Scientific classification
- Kingdom: Animalia
- Phylum: Mollusca
- Class: Gastropoda
- Subclass: Caenogastropoda
- Order: Neogastropoda
- Superfamily: Muricoidea
- Family: Muricidae
- Subfamily: Rapaninae
- Genus: Thais
- Species: T. tricolorata

Binomial name
- Thais tricolorata Bozzetti, 2010

= Thais tricolorata =

Species of gastropod

Thais tricolorata is a species of sea snail, a marine gastropod mollusk, in the family Muricidae, the murex snails or rock snails.

== Description ==
The length of the shell attains 27.3 mm.

== Distribution ==
This marine species occurs off Madagascar. Where exactly, is unknown.
