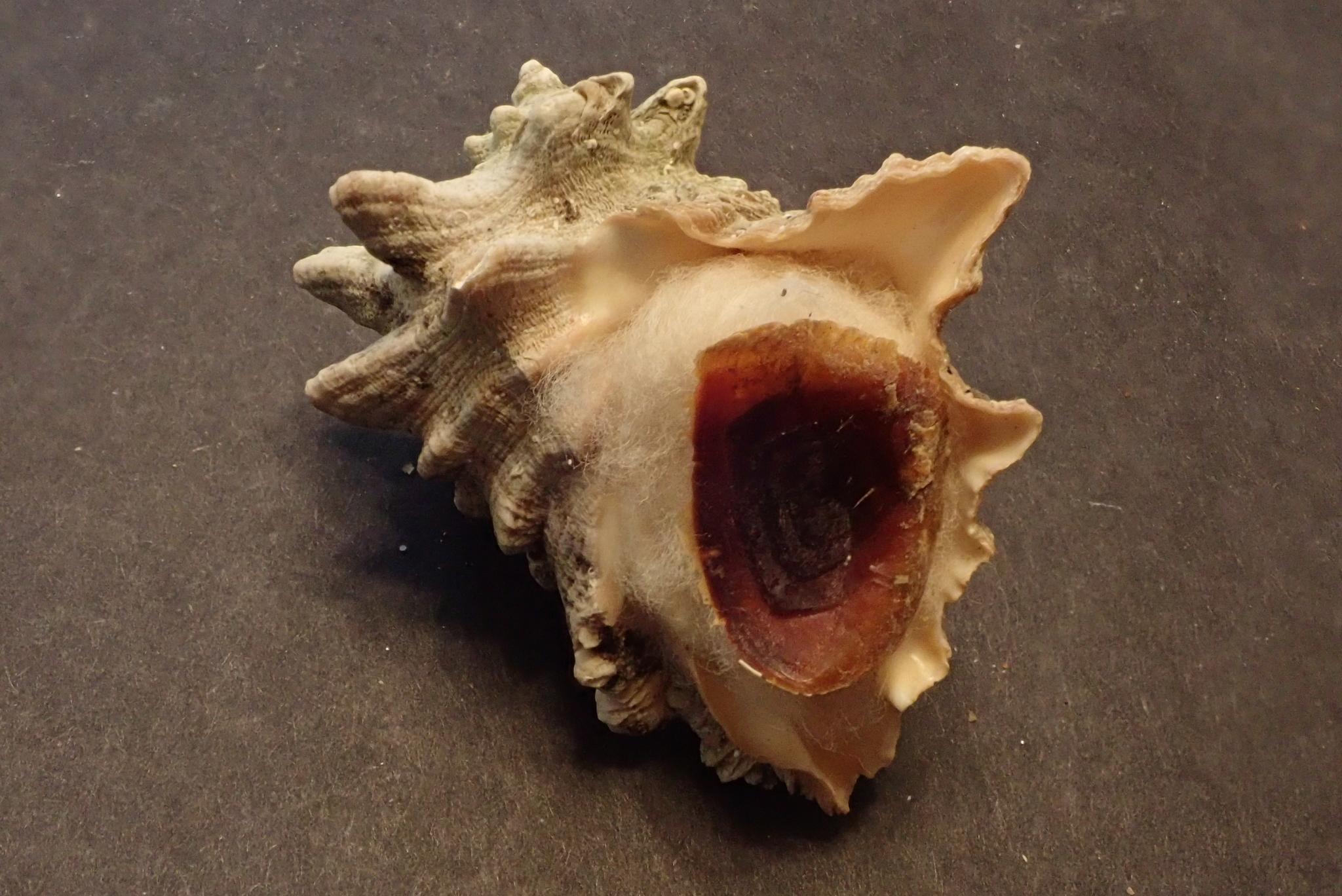
- Neorapana tuberculata

Scientific classification
- Kingdom: Animalia
- Phylum: Mollusca
- Class: Gastropoda
- Subclass: Caenogastropoda
- Order: Neogastropoda
- Family: Muricidae
- Subfamily: Rapaninae
- Genus: Neorapana; A. H. Cooke, 1918

Synonyms
- Acanthina (Neorapana) A. H. Cooke, 1918 (original rank); Thais (Neorapana) A. H. Cooke, 1918

= Neorapana =

Genus of gastropods

Neorapana is a genus of large predatory tropical sea snails, marine gastropod mollusks in the family Muricidae, the rock snails.

== Species ==
Species within the genus Neorapana include:

- Neorapana grandis Sowerby I, 1835
- Neorapana iwamasai Petuch, Berschauer & C. L. Powell, 2024
- Neorapana muricata (Broderip, 1832)
- Neorapana tuberculata (Sowerby I, 1835)
