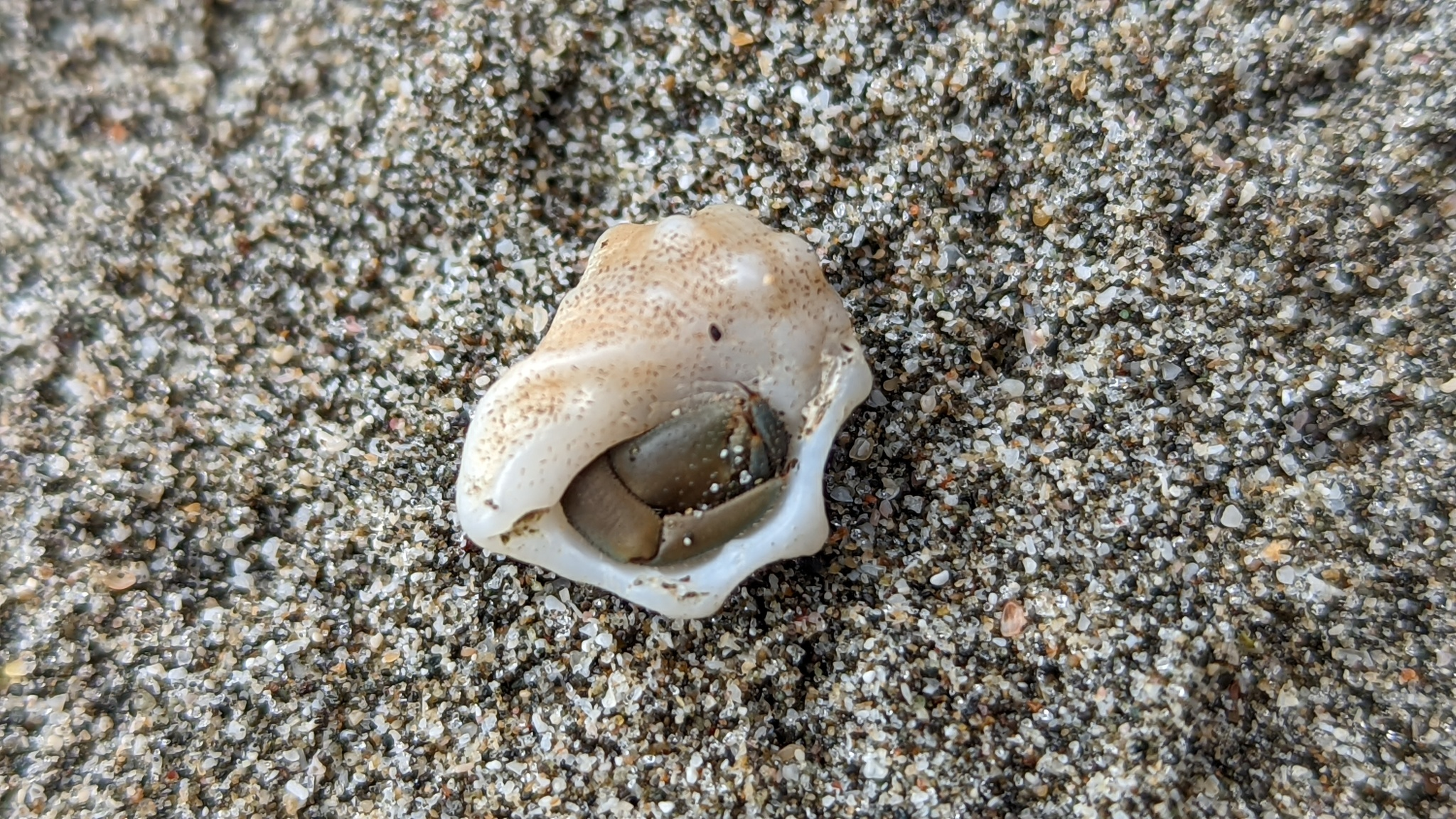

Scientific classification
- Kingdom: Animalia
- Phylum: Mollusca
- Class: Gastropoda
- Subclass: Caenogastropoda
- Order: Neogastropoda
- Superfamily: Muricoidea
- Family: Muricidae
- Subfamily: Rapaninae
- Genus: Acanthais
- Species: A. triangularis

Binomial name
- Acanthais triangularis (Blainville, 1832)

Synonyms
- Purpura carolensis Reeve, 1846; Purpura triangularis Blainville, 1832; Thais (Thais) triangularis (Blainville, 1832)

= Acanthais triangularis =

Species of gastropod

Acanthais triangularis is a species of sea snail, a marine gastropod mollusk, in the family Muricidae, the murex snails or rock snails.
