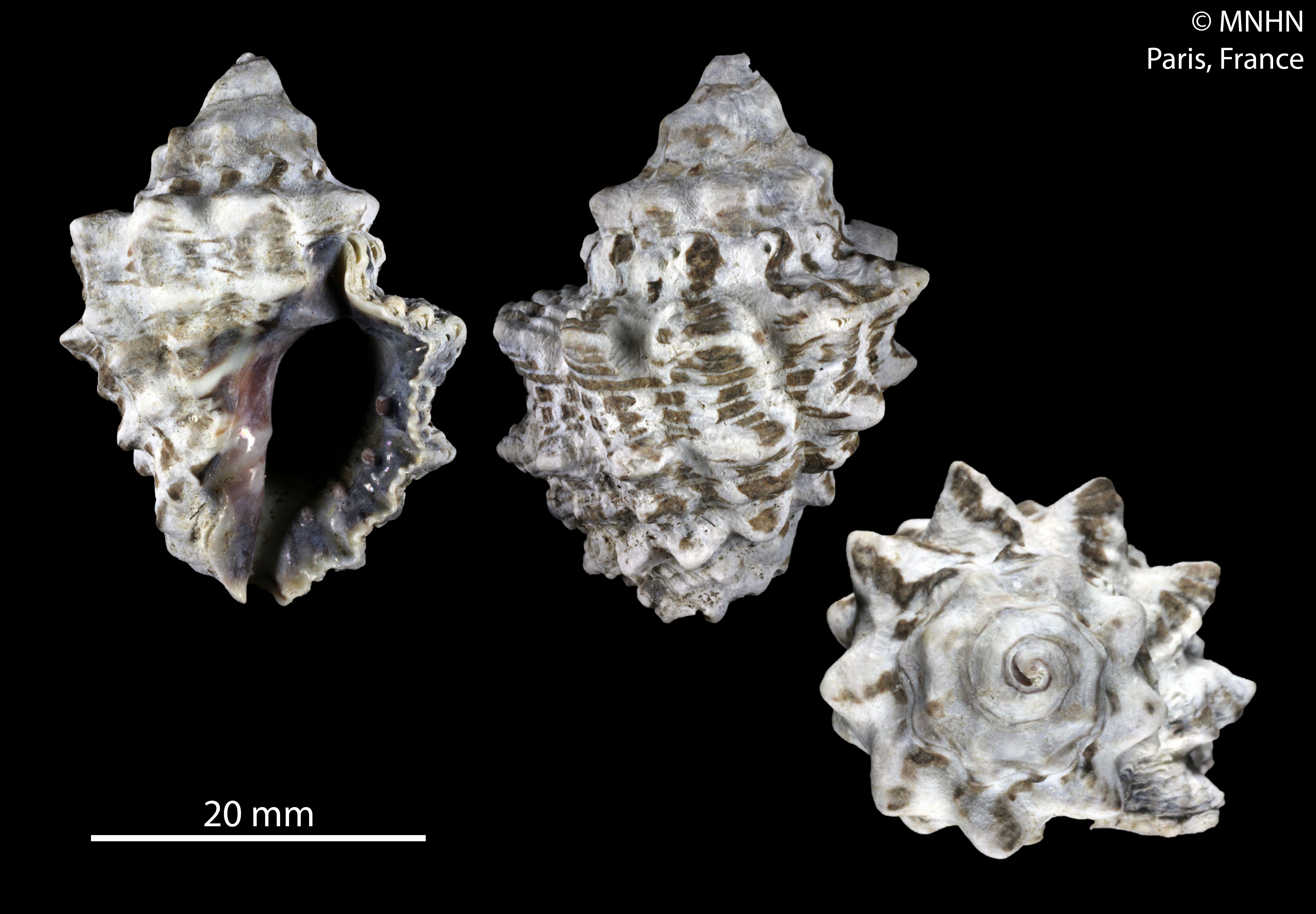
- Shell of Tylothais aculeata

Scientific classification
- Kingdom: Animalia
- Phylum: Mollusca
- Class: Gastropoda
- Subclass: Caenogastropoda
- Order: Neogastropoda
- Superfamily: Muricoidea
- Family: Muricidae
- Subfamily: Rapaninae
- Genus: Tylothais; Houart, 2017

Type species
- Purpura savignyi Deshayes, 1844

= Tylothais =

Genus of gastropods

Tylothais is a genus of sea snails, marine gastropod mollusks, in the subfamily Rapaninae of the family Muricidae, the murex snails or rock snails.

== Species ==
Species within the genus Tylothais include:

- Tylothais aculeata (Deshayes, 1844)
- Tylothais akidotos Houart, 2017
- Tylothais funilata Houart, 2017
- Tylothais inhacaensis Houart, 2017
- Tylothais ovata Houart, 2017
- Tylothais savignyi (Deshayes, 1844)
- Tylothais virgata (Dillwyn, 1817)
