= Thais dayunensis =

Scientific classification
- Kingdom: Animalia
- Phylum: Mollusca
- Class: Gastropoda
- Subclass: Caenogastropoda
- Order: Neogastropoda
- Superfamily: Muricoidea
- Family: Muricidae
- Subfamily: Rapaninae
- Genus: Thais
- Species: T. dayunensis

Binomial name
- Thais dayunensis Z.-Y. Chen & Z.-J. You, 2009

Synonyms
- Thais (Stramonita) dayunensis Z.-Y. Chen & Z.-J. You, 2009

Species of gastropod

Thais dayunensis is a species of sea snail, a marine gastropod mollusk, in the family Muricidae, the murex snails or rock snails.
