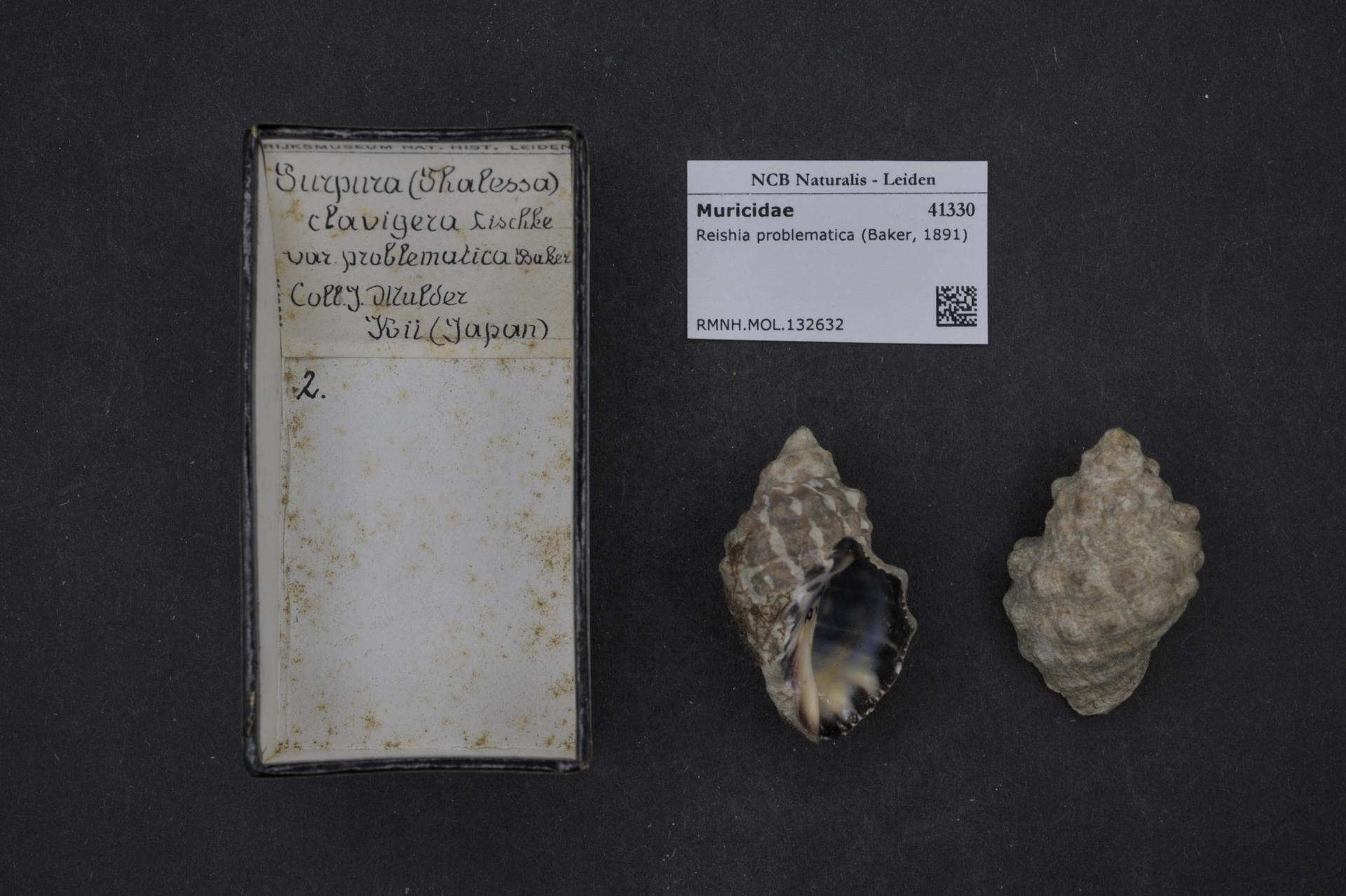
- Shell of Reishia problematica (specimen at Naturalis Biodivbersity Center)

Scientific classification
- Kingdom: Animalia
- Phylum: Mollusca
- Class: Gastropoda
- Subclass: Caenogastropoda
- Order: Neogastropoda
- Family: Muricidae
- Genus: Reishia
- Species: R. problematica

Binomial name
- Reishia problematica (Baker, 1891)

Synonyms
- Purpura problematica Baker, 1891

= Reishia problematica =

Species of gastropod

Reishia problematica is a species of sea snail, a marine gastropod mollusc in the family Muricidae, the murex snails or rock snails.
