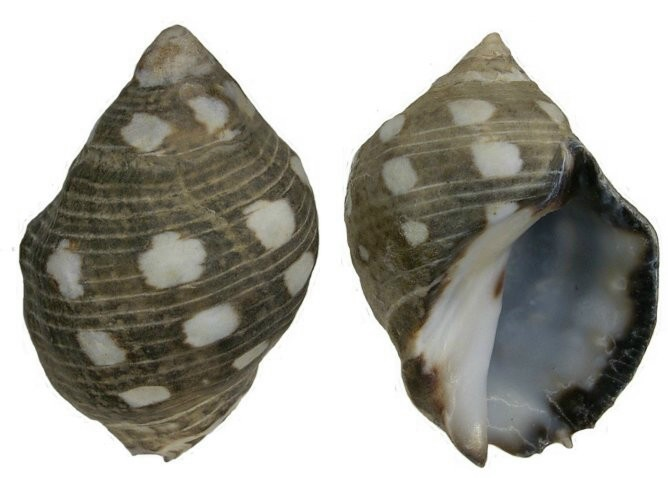
- Acanthais brevidentata shell

Scientific classification
- Kingdom: Animalia
- Phylum: Mollusca
- Class: Gastropoda
- Subclass: Caenogastropoda
- Order: Neogastropoda
- Family: Muricidae
- Genus: Acanthais
- Species: A. brevidentata

Binomial name
- Acanthais brevidentata (Wood, 1828)

Synonyms
- Buccinum brevidentatum Wood, 1828; Monoceros maculatum Gray, 1839; Purpura cornigera Blainville, 1832; Purpura ocellata Kiener, 1835

= Acanthais brevidentata =

Species of gastropod

Acanthais brevidentata is a species of sea snail, a marine gastropod mollusk in the family Muricidae, the murex snails or rock snails.
