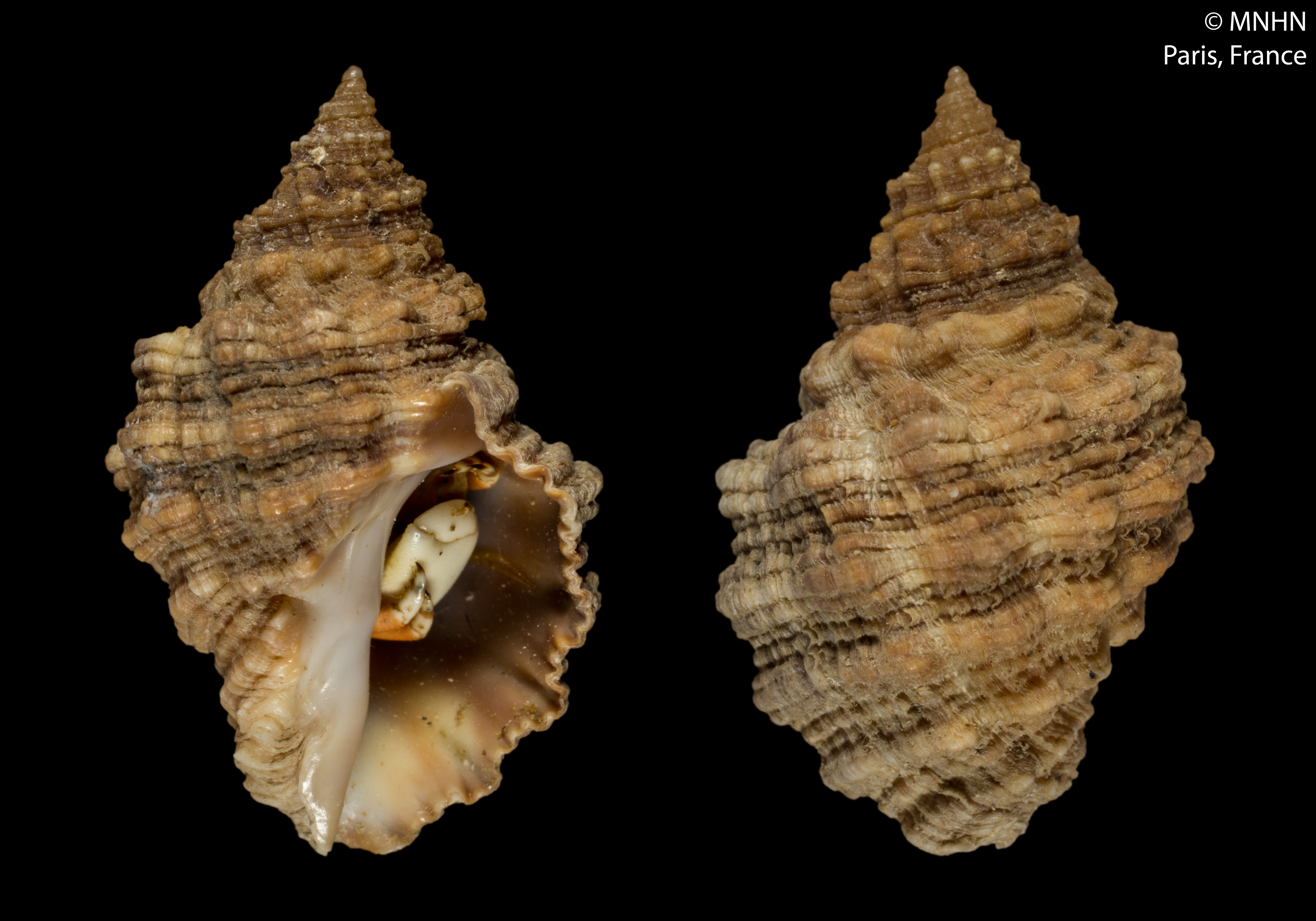
- Shell of Tylothais funilata (holotype at MNHN, Paris)

Scientific classification
- Kingdom: Animalia
- Phylum: Mollusca
- Class: Gastropoda
- Subclass: Caenogastropoda
- Order: Neogastropoda
- Family: Muricidae
- Subfamily: Rapaninae
- Genus: Tylothais
- Species: T. funilata

Binomial name
- Tylothais funilata Houart, 2017

= Tylothais funilata =

Species of gastropod

Tylothais funilata is a species of sea snail, a marine gastropod mollusk, in the family Muricidae, the murex snails or rock snails.

== Distribution ==
This species occurs in Mozambique.
