= Thais ambustulata =

Scientific classification
- Kingdom: Animalia
- Phylum: Mollusca
- Class: Gastropoda
- Subclass: Caenogastropoda
- Order: Neogastropoda
- Superfamily: Muricoidea
- Family: Muricidae
- Subfamily: Rapaninae
- Genus: Thais
- Species: T. ambustulata

Binomial name
- Thais ambustulata Hedley, 1912

Species of gastropod

Thais ambustulata is a species of sea snail, a marine gastropod mollusk, in the family Muricidae, the murex snails or rock snails.
