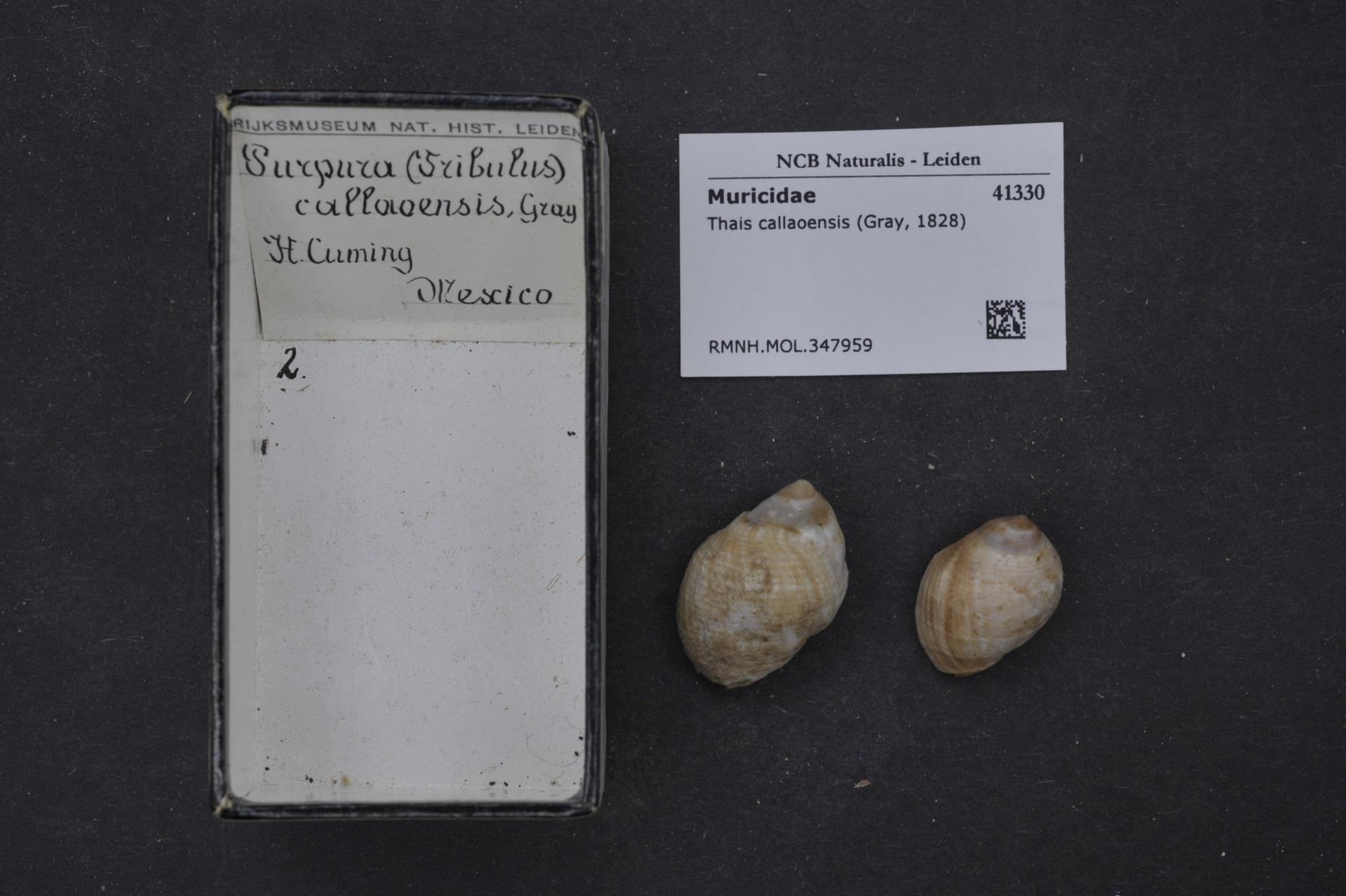
- Shell of Acanthais callaoensis (specimen at Naturalis Biodiversity Center)

Scientific classification
- Kingdom: Animalia
- Phylum: Mollusca
- Class: Gastropoda
- Subclass: Caenogastropoda
- Order: Neogastropoda
- Superfamily: Muricoidea
- Family: Muricidae
- Subfamily: Rapaninae
- Genus: Acanthais
- Species: A. callaoensis

Binomial name
- Acanthais callaoensis (Gray, 1828)

Synonyms
- Purpura callaoensis Gray, 1828; Thais (Thais) callaoensis (Gray, 1828); Thais stylmanberryi Peña, 1973

= Acanthais callaoensis =

Species of gastropod

Acanthais callaoensis is a species of sea snail, a marine gastropod mollusk, in the family Muricidae, the murex snails or rock snails.

== Description ==
The length of the shell attains 14.4 mm.

== Distribution ==
This marine species occurs off the Galapagos Islands.
