= Menathais viciani =

Scientific classification
- Kingdom: Animalia
- Phylum: Mollusca
- Class: Gastropoda
- Subclass: Caenogastropoda
- Order: Neogastropoda
- Superfamily: Muricoidea
- Family: Muricidae
- Subfamily: Rapaninae
- Genus: Menathais
- Species: †M. viciani

Binomial name
- †Menathais viciani Kovács, 2018

Extinct species of gastropod

Menathais viciani is an extinct species of sea snail, a marine gastropod mollusk, in the family Muricidae, the murex snails or rock snails.

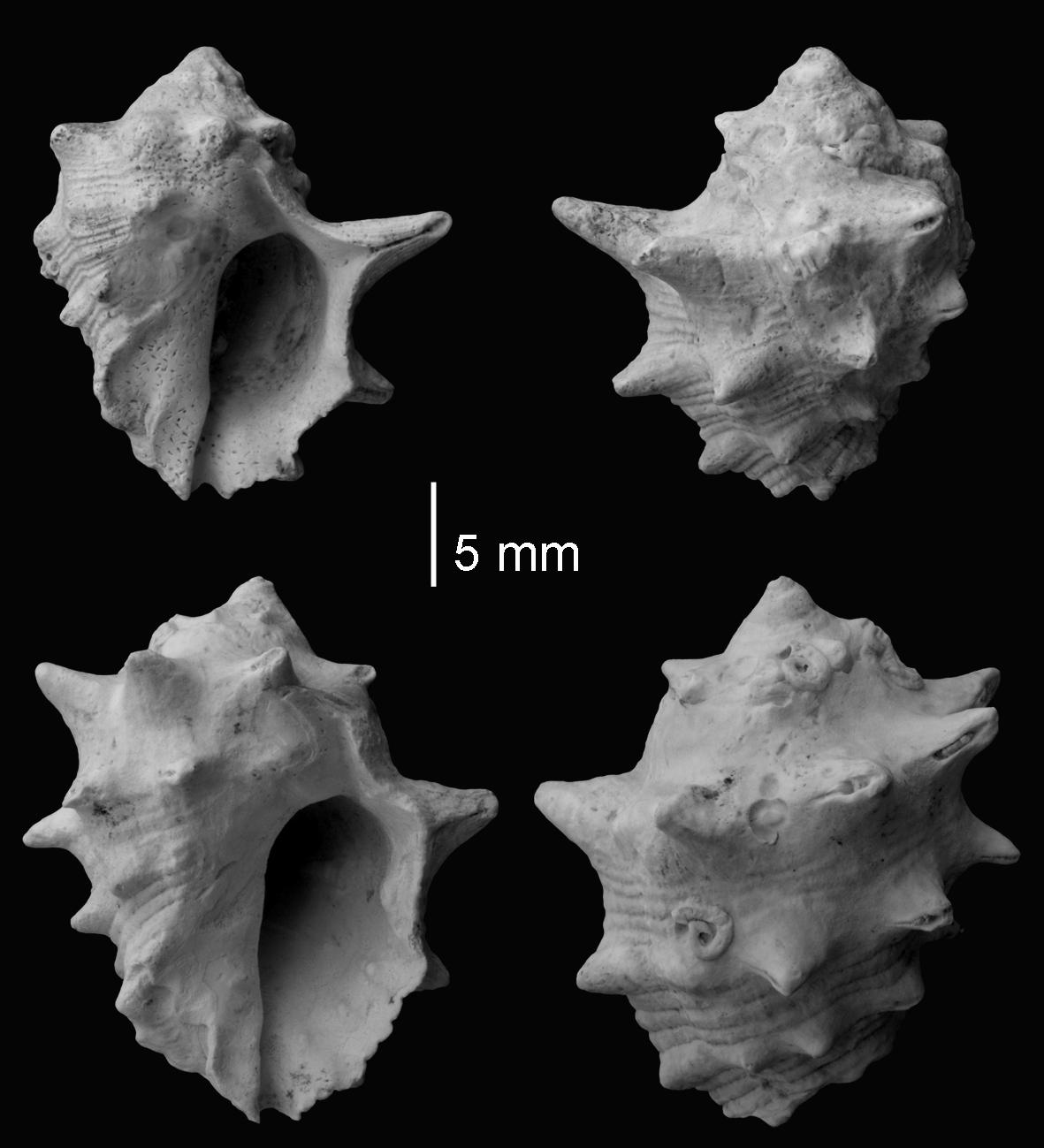
Menathais viciani Kovács, 2018. Middle Miocene, Letkés, Hungary

== Distribution ==
This species occurs in Middle Miocene deposits at Letkés, Hungary. It is the first fossil representative of genus Menathais.
