= Reishia okutanii =

Scientific classification
- Kingdom: Animalia
- Phylum: Mollusca
- Class: Gastropoda
- Subclass: Caenogastropoda
- Order: Neogastropoda
- Superfamily: Muricoidea
- Family: Muricidae
- Subfamily: Rapaninae
- Genus: Reishia
- Species: R. okutanii

Binomial name
- Reishia okutanii Thach, 2016

Species of gastropod

Reishia okutanii is a species of sea snail, a marine gastropod mollusk, in the family Muricidae, the murex snails or rock snails.

== Distribution ==
This species occurs in Vietnam.
