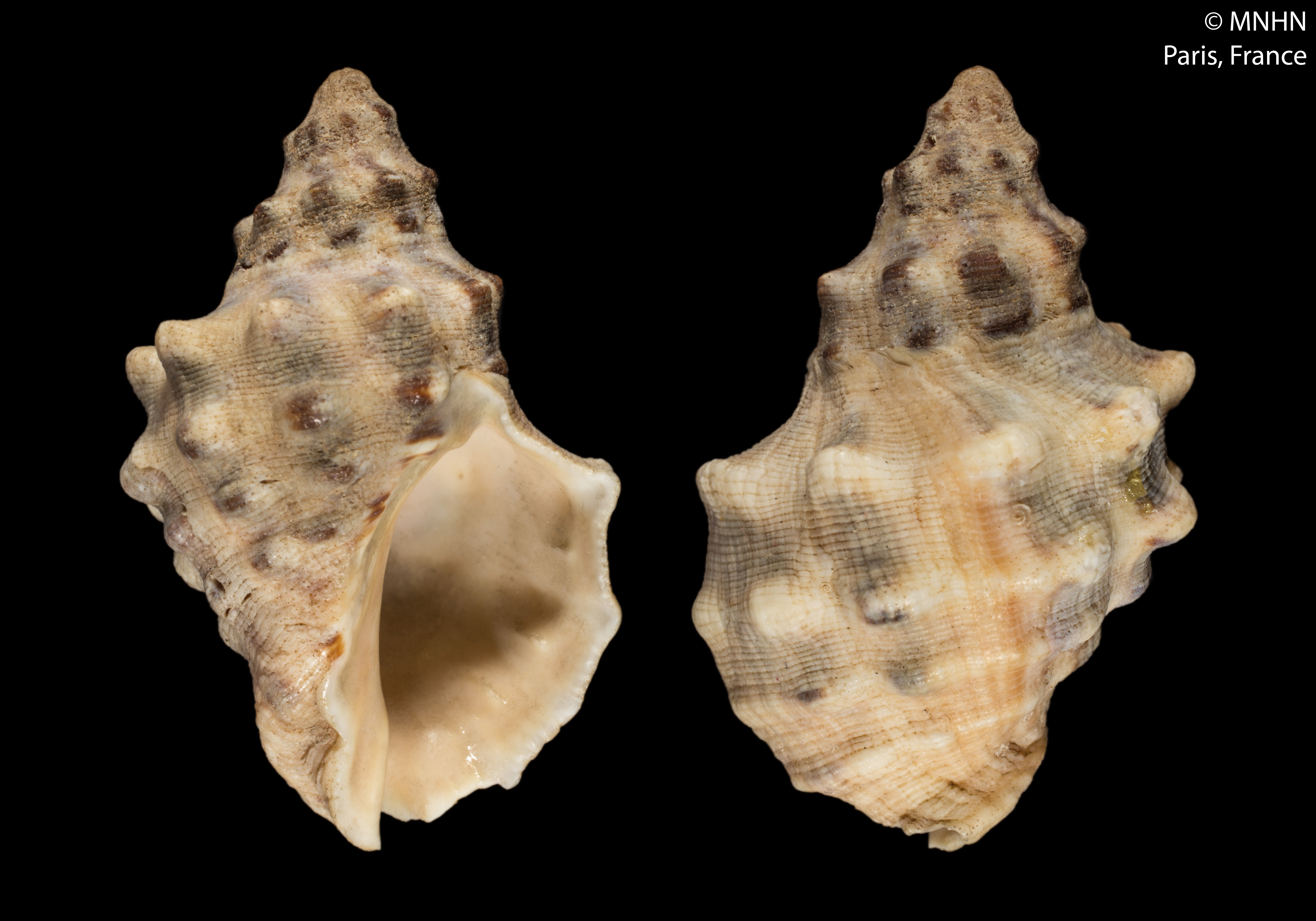
- Shell of Reishia luteostoma (syntype at MNHN, Paris)

Scientific classification
- Kingdom: Animalia
- Phylum: Mollusca
- Class: Gastropoda
- Subclass: Caenogastropoda
- Order: Neogastropoda
- Superfamily: Muricoidea
- Family: Muricidae
- Subfamily: Rapaninae
- Genus: Reishia
- Species: R. luteostoma

Binomial name
- Reishia luteostoma (Holten, 1803)

Synonyms
- Buccinum luteostoma Holten, 1803; Purpura bronni var. suppressa Grabau & S. G. King, 1928; Purpura bronni var. suppressa Grabau & S. G. King, 1928 ·; Purpura chusani Souleyet, 1852; Purpura suppressus Grabau & S. G. King, 1928; Reishia bronni (Dunker, 1860) junior subjective synonym; Reishia jubilaea (K.-S. Tan & Sigurdsson, 1990) junior subjective synonym; Thais (Thaisella) jubilaea K.-S. Tan & Sigurdsson, 1990; Thais (Thaisella) luteostoma (Holten, 1803); Thais bronni (Dunker, 1860); Thais jubilaea K.-S. Tan & Sigurdsson, 1990 (original combination); Thaisella jubilaea (K.-S. Tan & Sigurdsson, 1990) ·; Thaisella luteostoma (Holten, 1803)

= Reishia luteostoma =

Species of gastropod

Reishia luteostoma is a species of sea snail, a marine gastropod mollusk, in the family Muricidae, the murex snails or rock snails.

== Description ==
The shell size varies between 40 mm and 66 mm

== Distribution ==
This species occurs in the Pacific Ocean off Japan; also off Malaysia.
