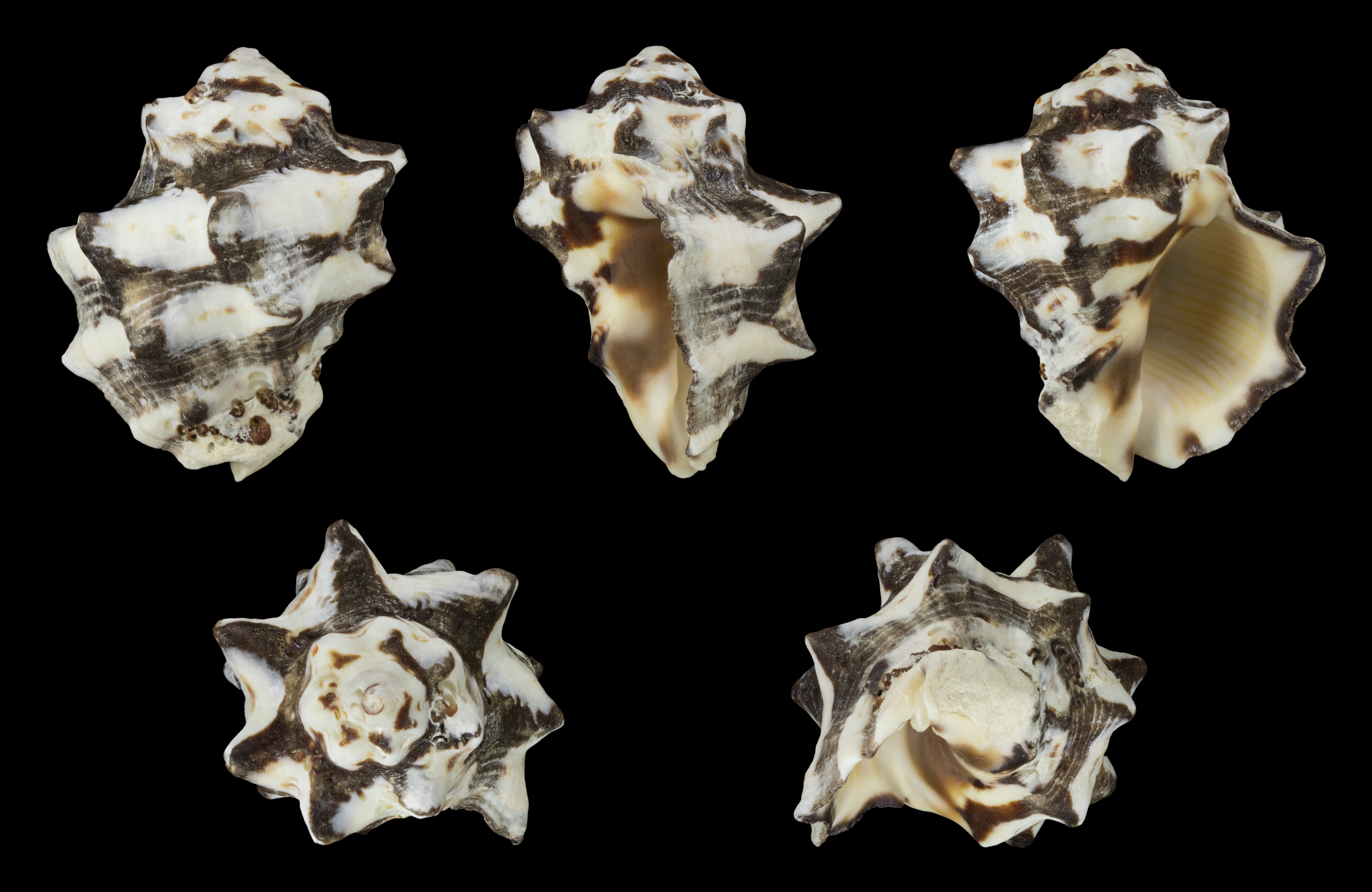

Scientific classification
- Kingdom: Animalia
- Phylum: Mollusca
- Class: Gastropoda
- Subclass: Caenogastropoda
- Order: Neogastropoda
- Superfamily: Muricoidea
- Family: Muricidae
- Subfamily: Rapaninae
- Genus: Menathais
- Species: M. tuberosa

Binomial name
- Menathais tuberosa (Röding, 1798)

Synonyms
- Drupa trapa Röding, 1798; Galeodes tuberosa Röding, 1798; Mancinella tuberosa (Röding, 1798); Purpura pica Blainville, 1832; Purpura pica var. major Couturier, 1907; Thais (Thalessa) tuberosa (Röding, 1798); Thais pica Blainville; Vasum castaneum Röding, 1798

= Menathais tuberosa =

Species of gastropod

Menathais tuberosa, commonly known as Humped rock shell or humped rocksnail, is a species of sea snail in the family Muricidae, the murex snails or rock snails.

== Description ==
The size of an adult shell varies between 17 mm and 50 mm.

== Distribution ==
This species occurs in the Indian Ocean off Madagascar and Tanzania; also in the southwestern and central Pacific Ocean off Tonga
