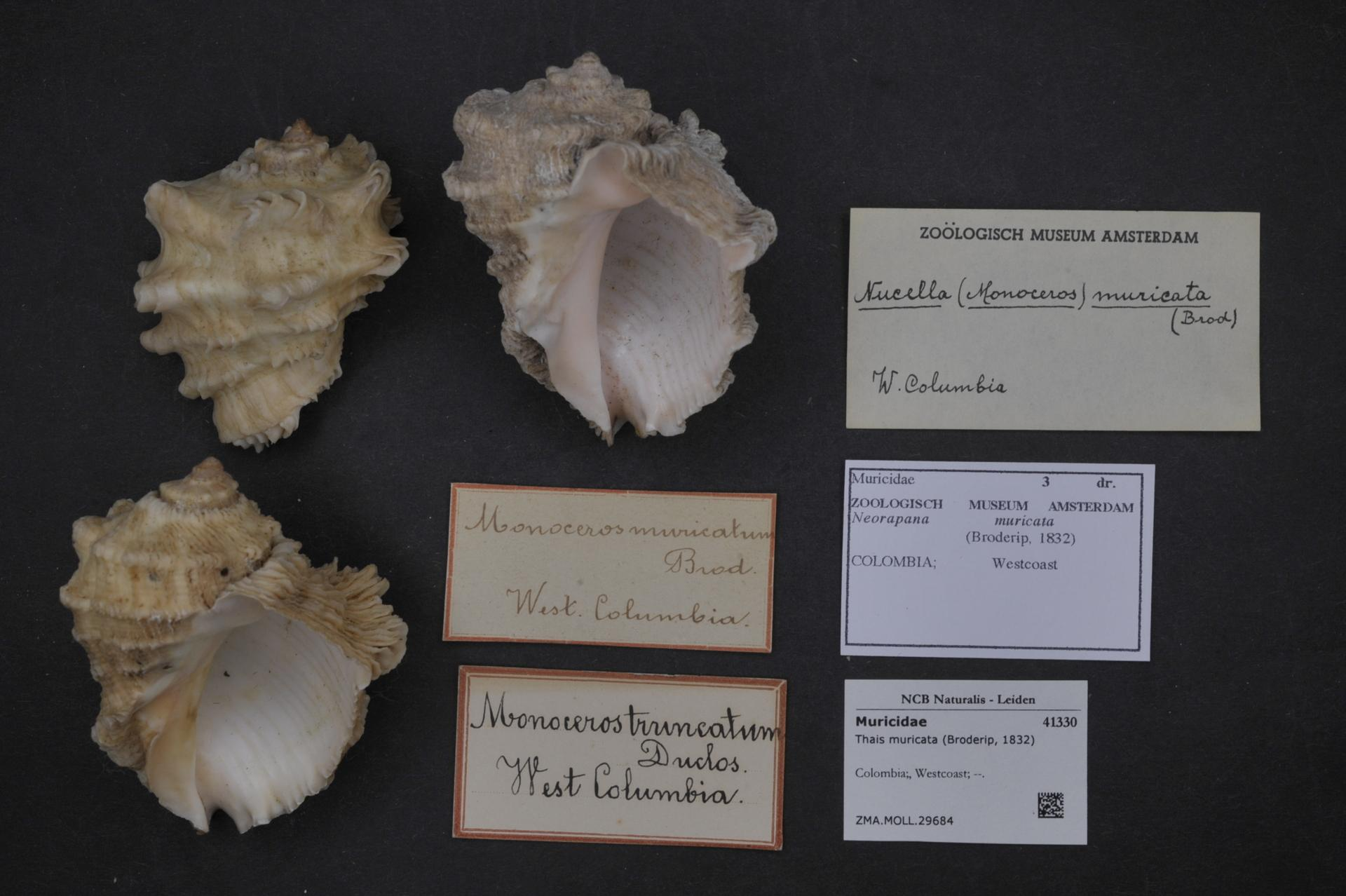
- Shell of Neorapana muricata (specimen at Naturalis Biodiversity Center )

Scientific classification
- Kingdom: Animalia
- Phylum: Mollusca
- Class: Gastropoda
- Subclass: Caenogastropoda
- Order: Neogastropoda
- Family: Muricidae
- Genus: Neorapana
- Species: N. muricata

Binomial name
- Neorapana muricata (Broderip, 1832)

Synonyms
- Purpura muricata Broderip, 1832 (basionym); Purpura truncata Duclos, 1833; Thais (Neorapana) muricata (Broderip, 1832)

= Neorapana muricata =

Species of gastropod

Neorapana muricata is a species of sea snail, a marine gastropod mollusk in the family Muricidae, the murex snails or rock snails.
