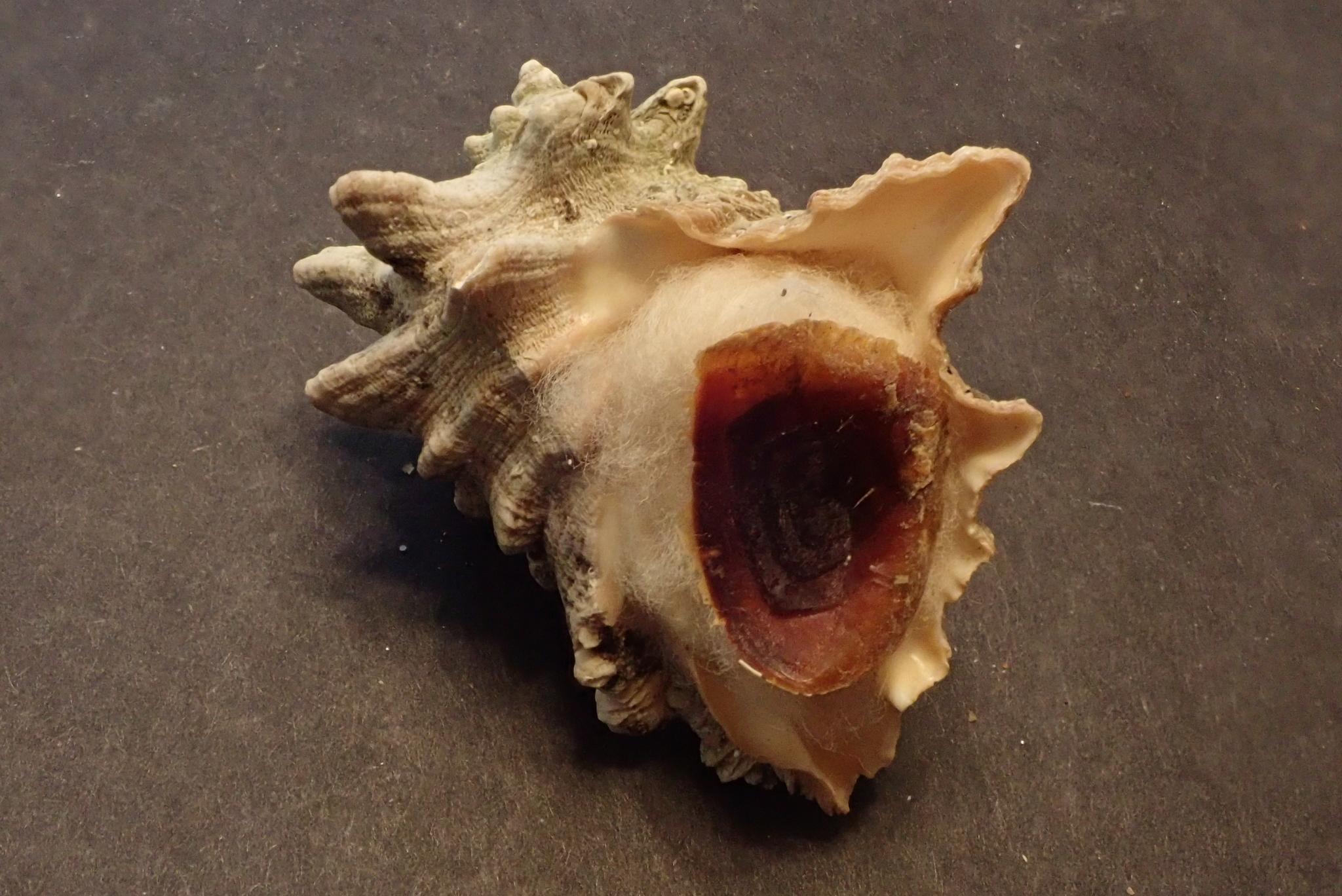

Scientific classification
- Kingdom: Animalia
- Phylum: Mollusca
- Class: Gastropoda
- Subclass: Caenogastropoda
- Order: Neogastropoda
- Family: Muricidae
- Genus: Neorapana
- Species: N. tuberculata

Binomial name
- Neorapana tuberculata (Sowerby I, 1835)

Synonyms
- Monoceros tuberculata Sowerby I 1835; Thais (Neorapana) tuberculata (Sowerby I, 1835)

= Neorapana tuberculata =

Species of gastropod

Neorapana tuberculata is a species of sea snail, a marine gastropod mollusk in the family Muricidae, the murex snails or rock snails.
