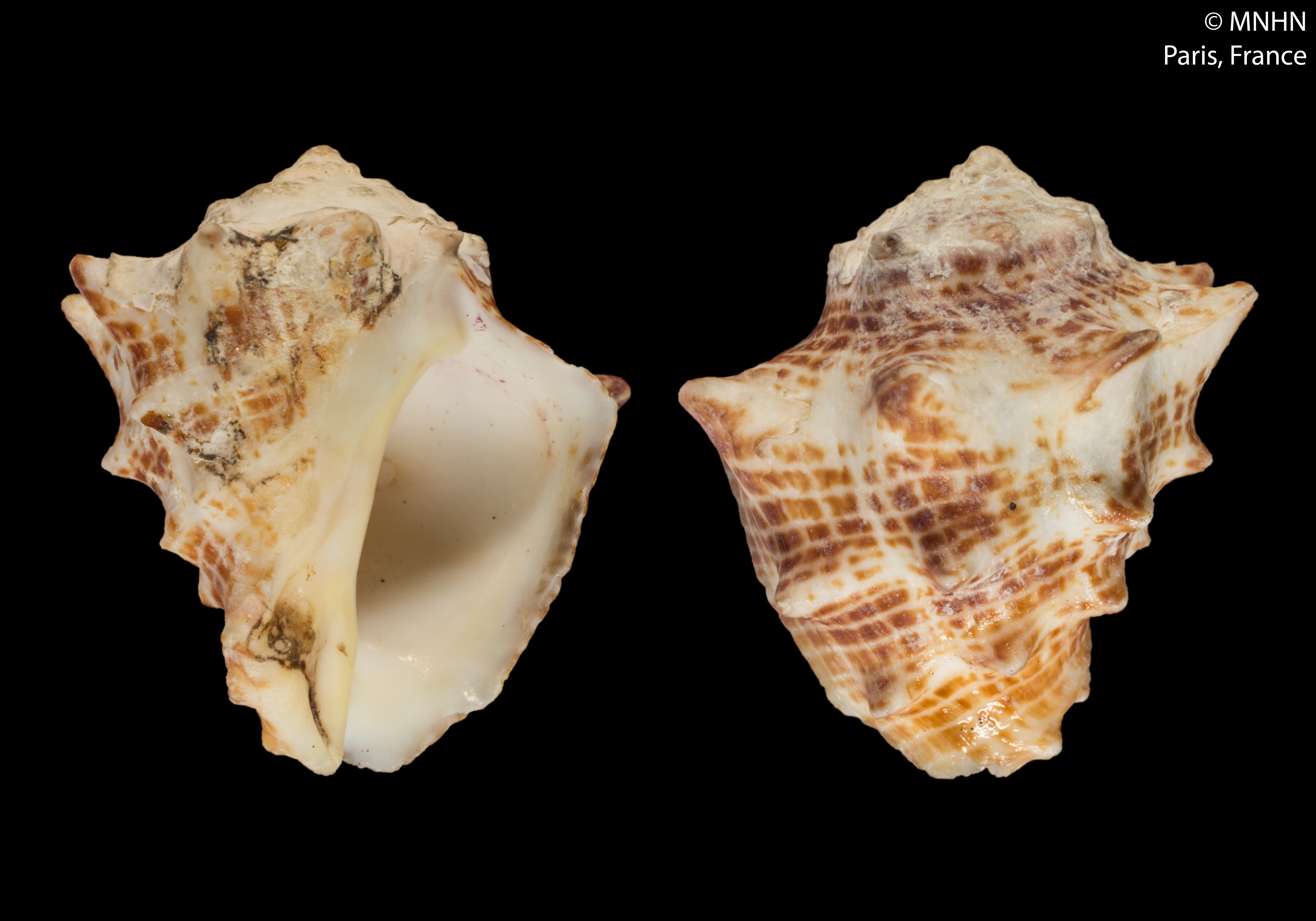
- Shell of Vasula speciosa (syntype at MNHN, Paris)

Scientific classification
- Kingdom: Animalia
- Phylum: Mollusca
- Class: Gastropoda
- Subclass: Caenogastropoda
- Order: Neogastropoda
- Family: Muricidae
- Subfamily: Rapaninae
- Genus: Vasula
- Species: V. speciosa

Binomial name
- Vasula speciosa (Valenciennes, 1832)

Synonyms
- Purpura centiquadra Duclos, 1832; Purpura multilineata Küster, 1859; Purpura speciosa Valenciennes, 1832; Purpura triserialis Blainville, 1832; Thais (Thais) speciosa (Valenciennes, 1832)

= Vasula speciosa =

Species of gastropod

Vasula speciosa is a species of sea snail, a marine gastropod mollusk, in the family Muricidae, the murex snails or rock snails.

== Description ==
The shell is white, with revolving bands composed of brown squares The shell is yellowish white within.

== Distribution ==
This species occurs in the Pacific Ocean from Baja California to Peru.
