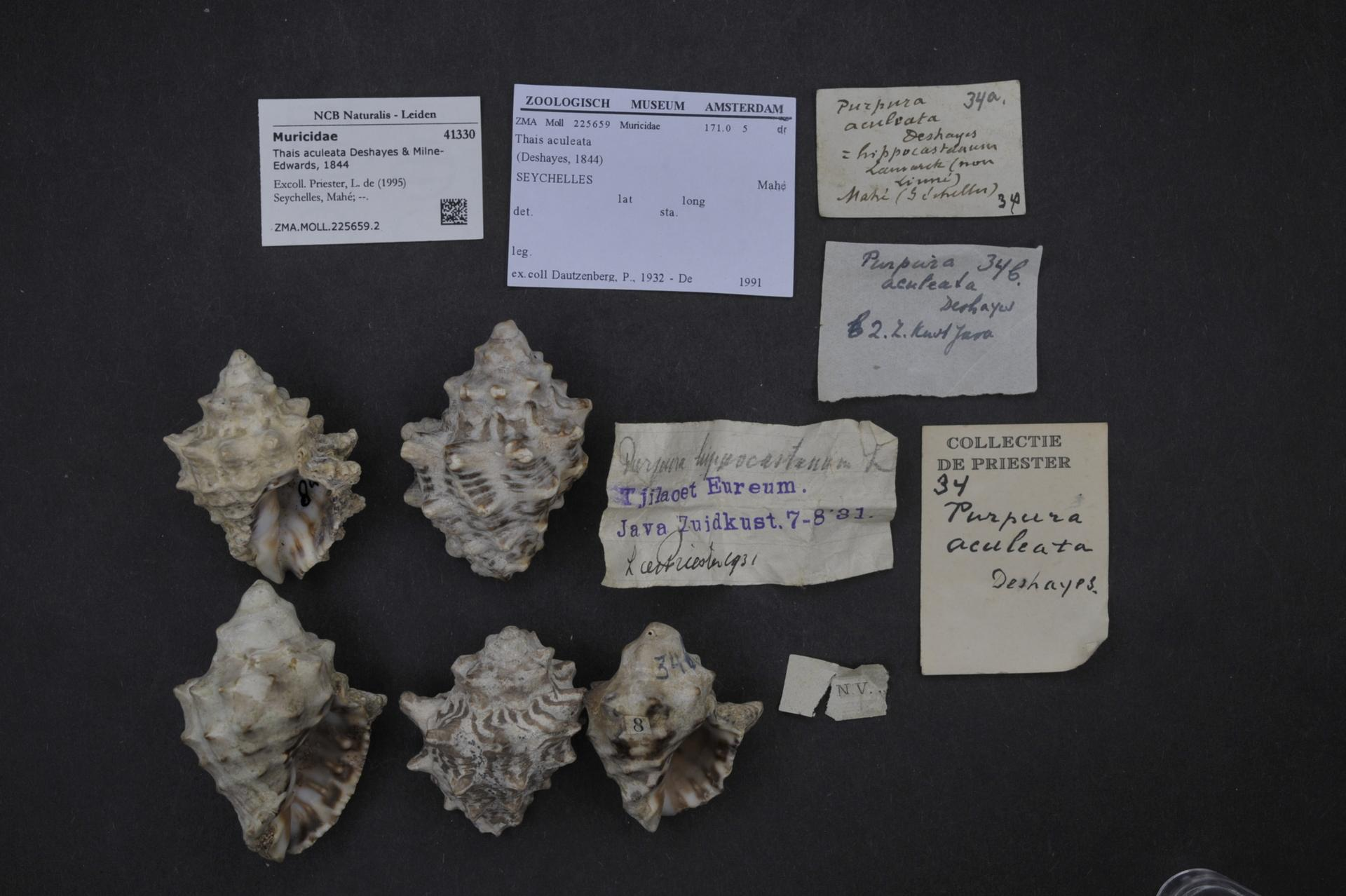
- Shell of Tylothais aculeata (specimen at Naturalis Biodiversity Center)

Scientific classification
- Kingdom: Animalia
- Phylum: Mollusca
- Class: Gastropoda
- Subclass: Caenogastropoda
- Order: Neogastropoda
- Superfamily: Muricoidea
- Family: Muricidae
- Subfamily: Rapaninae
- Genus: Tylothais
- Species: T. aculeata

Binomial name
- Tylothais aculeata (Deshayes, 1844)

Synonyms
- Purpura aculeata Deshayes, 1844; Thais (Thalessa) aculeata (Deshayes, 1844); Thais aculeata (Deshayes, 1844); Thalessa aculeata (Deshayes, 1844)

= Tylothais aculeata =

Species of gastropod

Tylothais aculeata is a species of sea snail, a marine gastropod mollusk, in the family Muricidae, the murex snails or rock snails.

== Distribution ==
This marine species occurs off Papua New Guinea.
