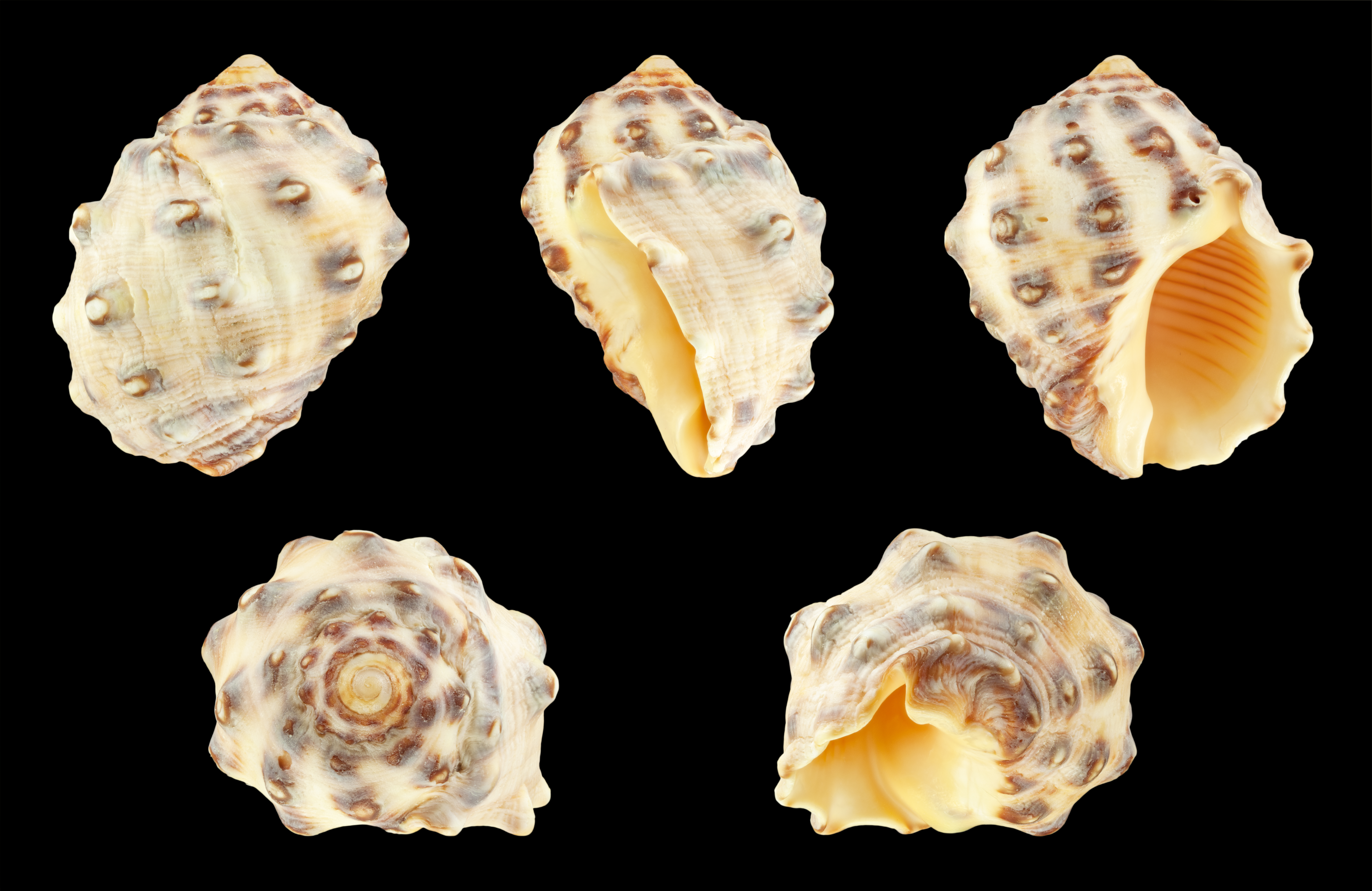

Scientific classification
- Kingdom: Animalia
- Phylum: Mollusca
- Class: Gastropoda
- Subclass: Caenogastropoda
- Order: Neogastropoda
- Superfamily: Muricoidea
- Family: Muricidae
- Subfamily: Rapaninae
- Genus: Mancinella
- Species: M. alouina

Binomial name
- Mancinella alouina (Röding, 1798)

Synonyms
- Drupella mancinella (Linnaeus, 1758); Mancinella aculeata Link, 1807; Mancinella mancinella (Linnaeus, 1758); Murex mancinella Linnaeus, 1758; Murex pyrum Dillwyn, 1817; Purpura gemmulata Lamarck, 1816; Purpura mancinella (Linnaeus, 1758); Thais (Mancinella) alouina (Röding, 1798); Thais (Mancinella) mancinella (Linnaeus, 1758); Thais gemmulata (Lamarck, 1816); Thais mancinella (Linnaeus, 1758); Volema alouina Röding, 1798; Volema glacialis Röding, 1798

= Mancinella alouina =

Species of gastropod

Mancinella alouina, common names alou rock shell, alou rock snail, is a species of sea snail, a marine gastropod mollusk, in the family Muricidae, the murex snails or rock snails.

== Description ==
The length of an adult shell varies between 30 mm and 61 mm.

== Distribution ==
This species occurs in the Indian Ocean off Kenya, the Mascarene Basin and Tanzania; in the Indo-West Pacific.
