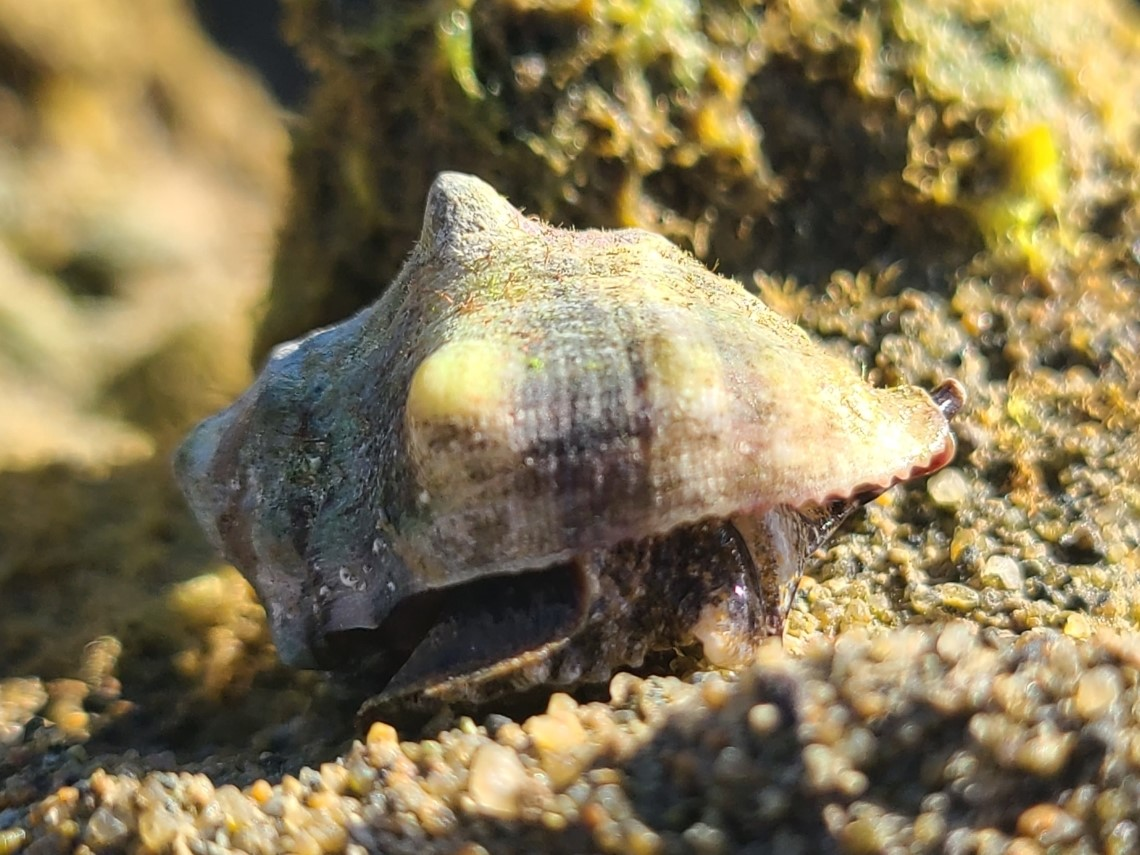

Scientific classification
- Kingdom: Animalia
- Phylum: Mollusca
- Class: Gastropoda
- Subclass: Caenogastropoda
- Order: Neogastropoda
- Family: Muricidae
- Genus: Vasula
- Species: V. deltoidea

Binomial name
- Vasula deltoidea (Lamarck, 1822)

Synonyms
- Mancinella deltoidea (Lamarck, 1822); Purpura deltoidea Lamarck, 1822 (original combination); Purpura subdeltoidea Blainville, 1832; Thais (Thalessa) deltoidea (Lamarck, 1822); Thais deltoidea (Lamarck, 1822)

= Vasula deltoidea =

Species of gastropod

Vasula deltoidea is a species of sea snail, a marine gastropod mollusk in the family Muricidae, the murex snails or rock snails.

== Description ==
The length of the shell attains 37 mm.

The shell is light brown or whitish, with dark chestnut bands, which sometimes appear also on the inside of the outer lip. The columella is pink.

This is a shallow water species, often prone to significant encrustation by calcareous algae.

== Distribution ==
Known from the Atlantic coast of Florida and also from Barbados, Lesser Antilles, and Venezuela.
