= Menathais bimaculata =

Scientific classification
- Kingdom: Animalia
- Phylum: Mollusca
- Class: Gastropoda
- Subclass: Caenogastropoda
- Order: Neogastropoda
- Superfamily: Muricoidea
- Family: Muricidae
- Subfamily: Rapaninae
- Genus: Menathais
- Species: M. bimaculata

Binomial name
- Menathais bimaculata (Jonas, 1845)

Synonyms
- Purpura bimaculata Jonas, 1845; Thais (Thais) bimaculata (Jonas, 1845)

Species of gastropod

Menathais bimaculata is a species of sea snail, a marine gastropod mollusk, in the family Muricidae, the murex snails or rock snails.
