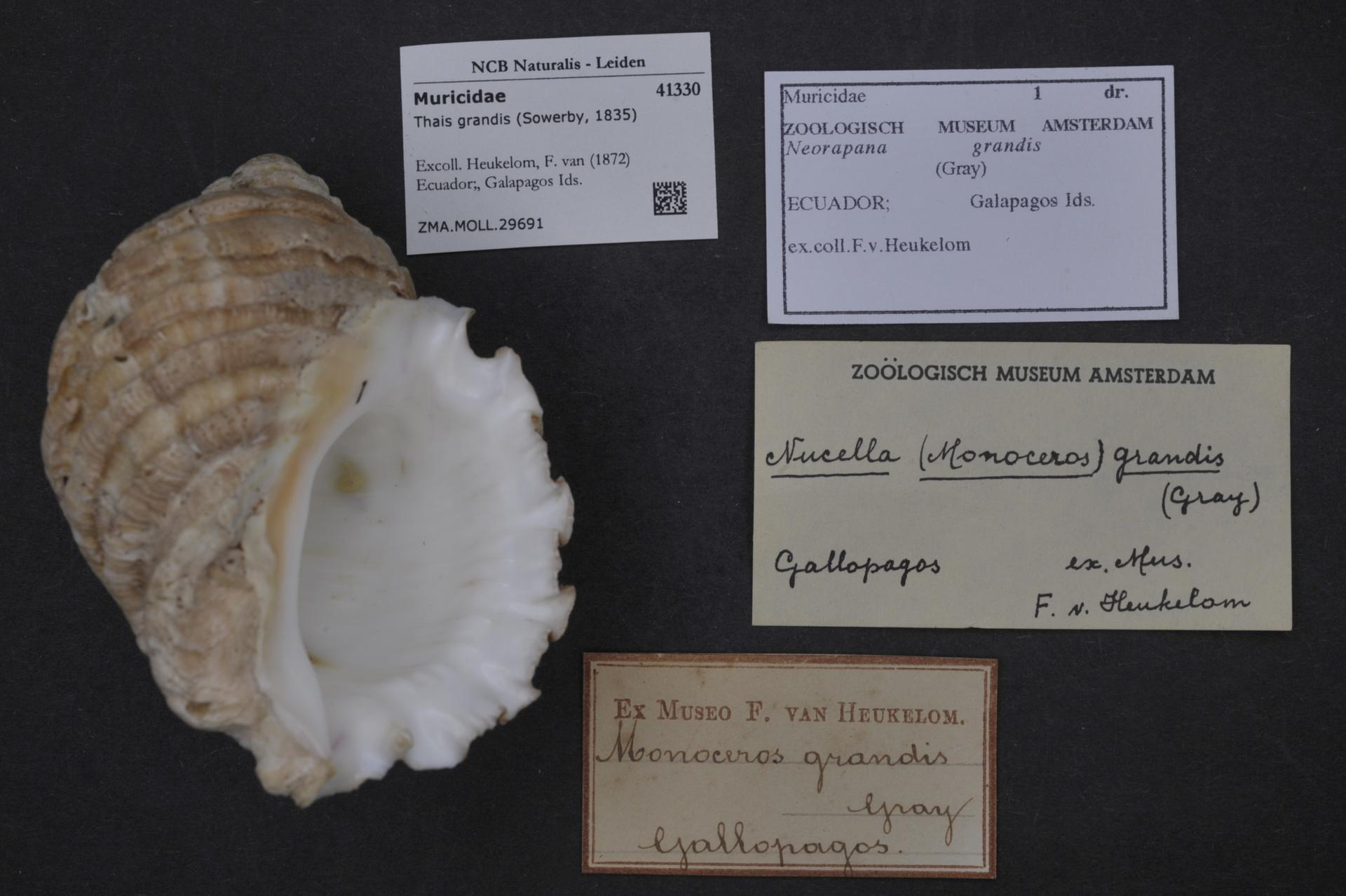
- Shell of Neorapana grandis (specimen at Naturalis Biodiversity Center)

Conservation status
- Data Deficient (IUCN 2.3)

Scientific classification
- Kingdom: Animalia
- Phylum: Mollusca
- Class: Gastropoda
- Subclass: Caenogastropoda
- Order: Neogastropoda
- Family: Muricidae
- Genus: Neorapana
- Species: N. grandis

Binomial name
- Neorapana grandis Sowerby I, 1835

Synonyms
- Monoceros grandis Sowerby I, 1835; Purpura grayi Kiener, 1835-36; Thais (Neorapana) grandis (Sowerby I, 1835)

= Neorapana grandis =

Species of gastropod

Neorapana grandis is a species of large predatory tropical sea snail, a marine gastropod mollusks in the family Muricidae, the rock snails.

== Distribution ==
This species is endemic to Ecuador, specifically to the Galapagos Islands.

== Description ==
The shell of this species is 60 to 90 mm (2½ to 3½ inches) long, with brown scaly spiral ribbing.
