= Vasula melones =

Scientific classification
- Kingdom: Animalia
- Phylum: Mollusca
- Class: Gastropoda
- Subclass: Caenogastropoda
- Order: Neogastropoda
- Superfamily: Muricoidea
- Family: Muricidae
- Subfamily: Rapaninae
- Genus: Vasula
- Species: V. melones

Binomial name
- Vasula melones (Duclos, 1832)

Synonyms
- Purpura crassa Blainville, 1832; Purpura melones Duclos, 1832; Thais (Vasula) melones (Duclos, 1832)

Species of gastropod

Vasula melones is a species of sea snail, a marine gastropod mollusk, in the family Muricidae, the murex snails or rock snails.

== Description ==
The length of the shell attains 49 mm.

The dark chestnut shell is variegated with white, especially upon the periphery and inferior portion of the body. The columella is tinged with pink. The outer lip is frequently black-bordered.

The want of nodules or spines disagrees with the character of the group; yet the relationship of this species with Vasula deltoidea is tolerably close. Sometimes the body whorl is, in adults, constricted around the middle.

== Distribution ==
This marine species occurs off Costa Rica, Panama, Ecuador and the Galapagos Islands.
