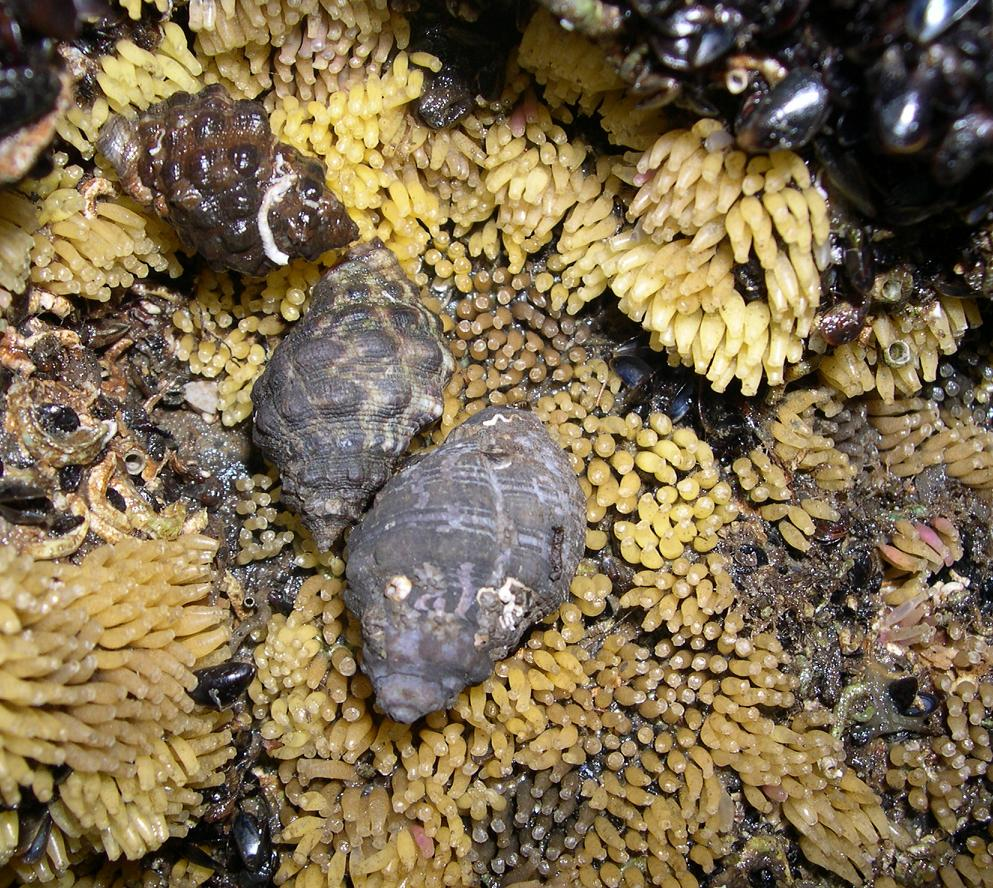
- Three individuals of Thais clavigera with many egg masses

Scientific classification
- Kingdom: Animalia
- Phylum: Mollusca
- Class: Gastropoda
- Subclass: Caenogastropoda
- Order: Neogastropoda
- Family: Muricidae
- Genus: Reishia
- Species: R. clavigera

Binomial name
- Reishia clavigera (Küster, 1860)

Synonyms
- Purpura clavigera Küster, 1860; Thais clavigera (Küster, 1860); Purpura altispiralis Grabau & King, 1928; Purpura alveolata var. pechiliensis Grabau & King, 1928

= Reishia clavigera =

Species of gastropod

Reishia clavigera is a species of sea snail, a marine gastropod mollusc in the family Muricidae, the murex snails or rock snails.

This species has been found to be useful as an indicator of the environmental contamination levels of arsenic, copper, and zinc.

== Distribution ==
This is an intertidal species, found on rocky shores in Malaysia, Singapore and Indo-China; also off Japan.
