= Terminalia intermedia =

Terminalia intermedia may refer to one of several species of tropical trees:

- Terminalia intermedia (A.Rich.) Urb., synonym of Terminalia diptera (Sagra) Greuter & R.Rankin, a threatened species shown on the list of endangered plants
- Terminalia intermedia Bertero ex Spreng., synonym of Terminalia catappa L.
- Terminalia intermedia Span., synonym of Terminalia microcarpa Decne.
