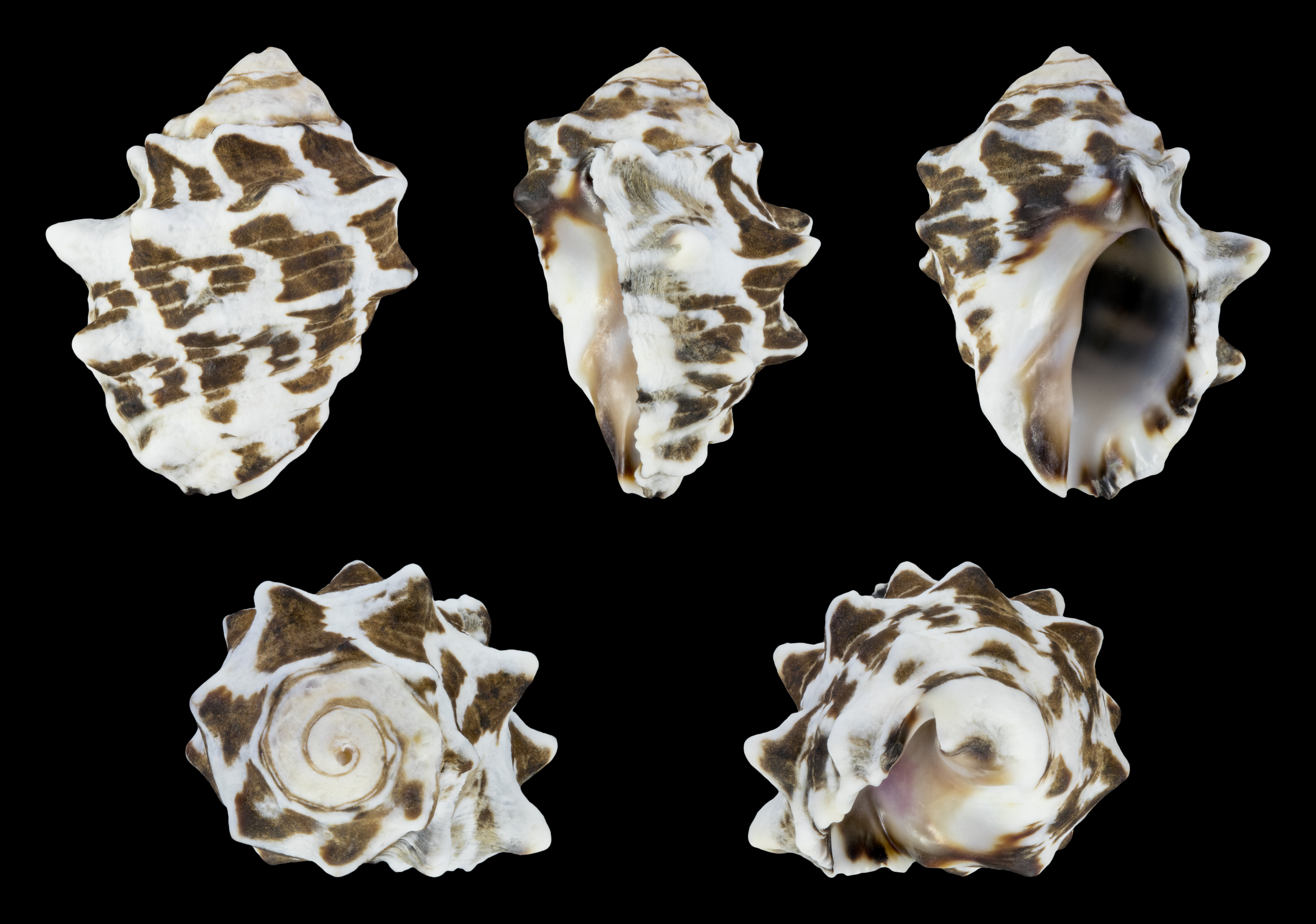

Scientific classification
- Kingdom: Animalia
- Phylum: Mollusca
- Class: Gastropoda
- Subclass: Caenogastropoda
- Order: Neogastropoda
- Superfamily: Muricoidea
- Family: Muricidae
- Subfamily: Rapaninae
- Genus: Tylothais
- Species: T. savignyi

Binomial name
- Tylothais savignyi (Deshayes, 1844)

Synonyms
- Purpura savignyi Deshayes, 1844; Thais (Thalessa) savignyi (Deshayes, 1844); Thais savignyi (Deshayes, 1844); Thalessa savignyi (Deshayes, 1844)

= Tylothais savignyi =

Species of gastropod

Tylothais savignyi is a species of sea snail, a marine gastropod mollusk, in the family Muricidae, the murex snails or rock snails.

== Distribution ==
This species occurs in the Red Sea, Gulf of Aden, Socotra, Arabian Sea, Gulf of Oman, and the Persian Gulf.
