= Reishia keluo =

Scientific classification
- Kingdom: Animalia
- Phylum: Mollusca
- Class: Gastropoda
- Subclass: Caenogastropoda
- Order: Neogastropoda
- Superfamily: Muricoidea
- Family: Muricidae
- Subfamily: Rapaninae
- Genus: Reishia
- Species: R. keluo

Binomial name
- Reishia keluo (Tan & Liu, 2001)

Synonyms
- Thais (Thaisella) keluo Tan & Liu, 2001; Thais keluo Tan & Liu, 2001; Thaisella keluo (Tan & Liu, 2001)

Species of gastropod

Reishia keluo is a species of sea snail, a marine gastropod mollusk, in the family Muricidae, the murex snails or rock snails.
