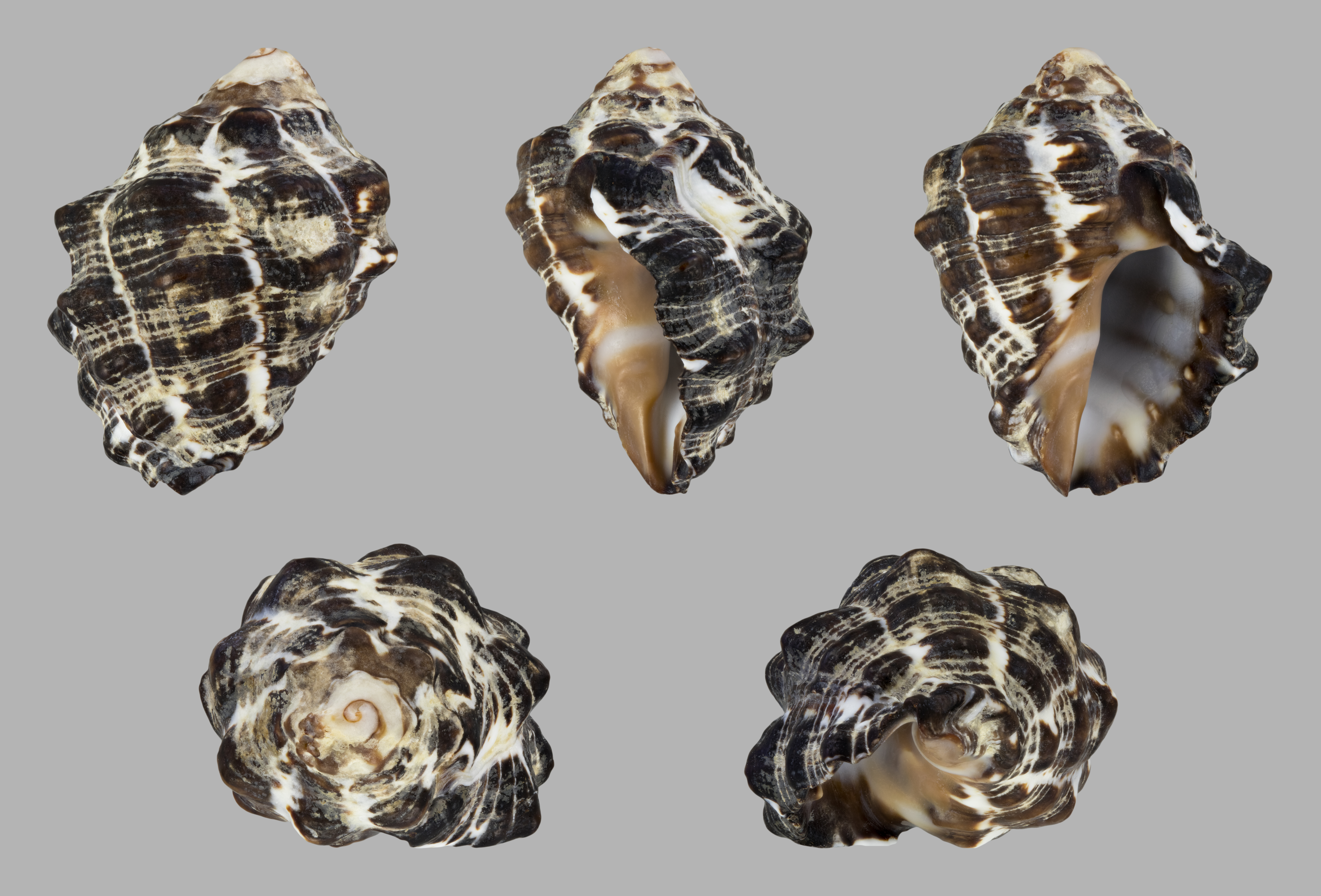

Scientific classification
- Kingdom: Animalia
- Phylum: Mollusca
- Class: Gastropoda
- Subclass: Caenogastropoda
- Order: Neogastropoda
- Superfamily: Muricoidea
- Family: Muricidae
- Subfamily: Rapaninae
- Genus: Tylothais
- Species: T. virgata

Binomial name
- Tylothais virgata (Dillwyn, 1817)

Synonyms
- Murex plicatus Gmelin, 1791; Murex virgatus Dillwyn, 1817; Purpura distinguenda Dunker, 1866; Purpura pseudohippocastanum Dautzenberg, 1929; Thais (Thalessa) virgata (Dillwyn, 1817); Thais distinguenda (Dunker, 1866); Thalessa distinguenda (Dunker, 1866); Thalessa virgata (Dillwyn, 1817)

= Tylothais virgata =

Species of gastropod

Tylothais virgata is a species of sea snail, a marine gastropod mollusk, in the family Muricidae, the murex snails or rock snails.

== Description ==
The shell size varies between 25 mm and 60 mm

== Distribution ==
This species occurs in the Red Sea, in the Indian Ocean off Madagascar and in the Indo-Pacific; also off Thailand.
