= Reishia jubilaea =

Scientific classification
- Kingdom: Animalia
- Phylum: Mollusca
- Class: Gastropoda
- Subclass: Caenogastropoda
- Order: Neogastropoda
- Superfamily: Muricoidea
- Family: Muricidae
- Subfamily: Rapaninae
- Genus: Reishia
- Species: R. jubilaea

Binomial name
- Reishia jubilaea (Tan & Sigurdsson, 1990)

Synonyms
- Thais (Thaisella) jubilaea Tan & Sigurdsson, 1990; Thais jubilaea Tan & Sigurdsson, 1990; Thaisella jubilaea (Tan & Sigurdsson, 1990)

Species of gastropod

Reishia jubilaea is a species of sea snail, a marine gastropod mollusk, in the family Muricidae, the murex snails or rock snails.
