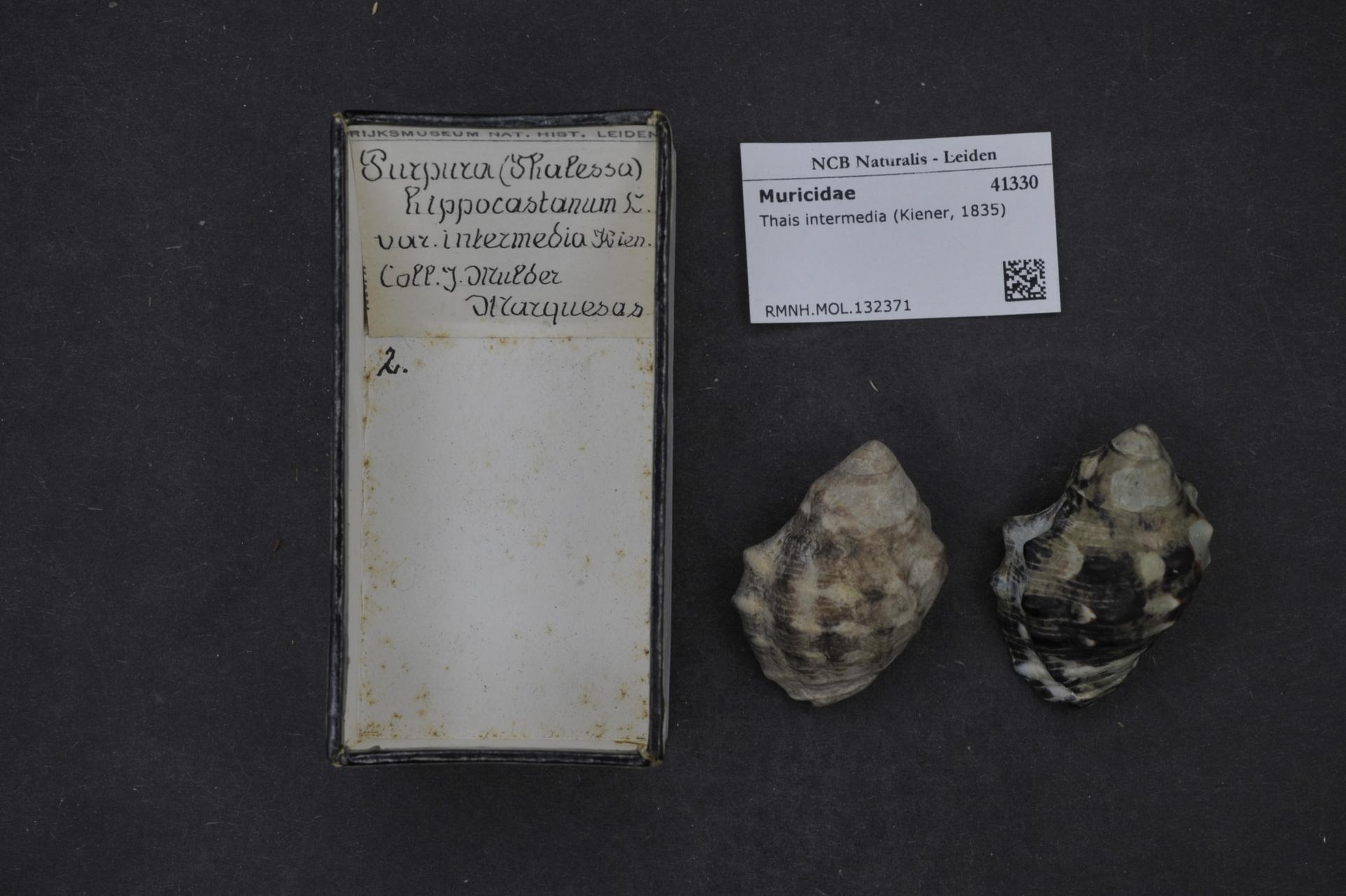
- Shell of Menathais intermedia (specimen at Naturalis Biodiversity Center)

Scientific classification
- Kingdom: Animalia
- Phylum: Mollusca
- Class: Gastropoda
- Subclass: Caenogastropoda
- Order: Neogastropoda
- Superfamily: Muricoidea
- Family: Muricidae
- Subfamily: Rapaninae
- Genus: Menathais
- Species: M. intermedia

Binomial name
- Menathais intermedia (Kiener, 1836)

Synonyms
- Purpura intermedia Kiener, 1835; Ricinula intermedia (Kiener, 1835) superseded combination; Thais (Thalessa) intermedia (Kiener, 1835); Thais intermedia (Kiener, 1835)

= Menathais intermedia =

Species of sea snail

Menathais intermedia is a species of sea snail, a marine gastropod mollusk, in the family Muricidae, the murex snails or rock snails.

== Description ==
Menathais Intermedia is a small snail with a solid shell that has a rough, bumpy surface. The shell has an ovate or spire shape with white nodules on a dark gray or black background. Some may be of a colorful pink color inside, with some rough, ridgy edges along the shell. The trochophore life stage is missing in its life cycle.

== Distribution and habitat ==
Menathais Intermedia can be found in the tropical Indo-Pacific, from east Africa to northeast and southeast Asia, including South Africa, Hawaii, and the Society Islands.

== Reproduction ==
Menathais Intermedia is a non-broadcast spawner.
