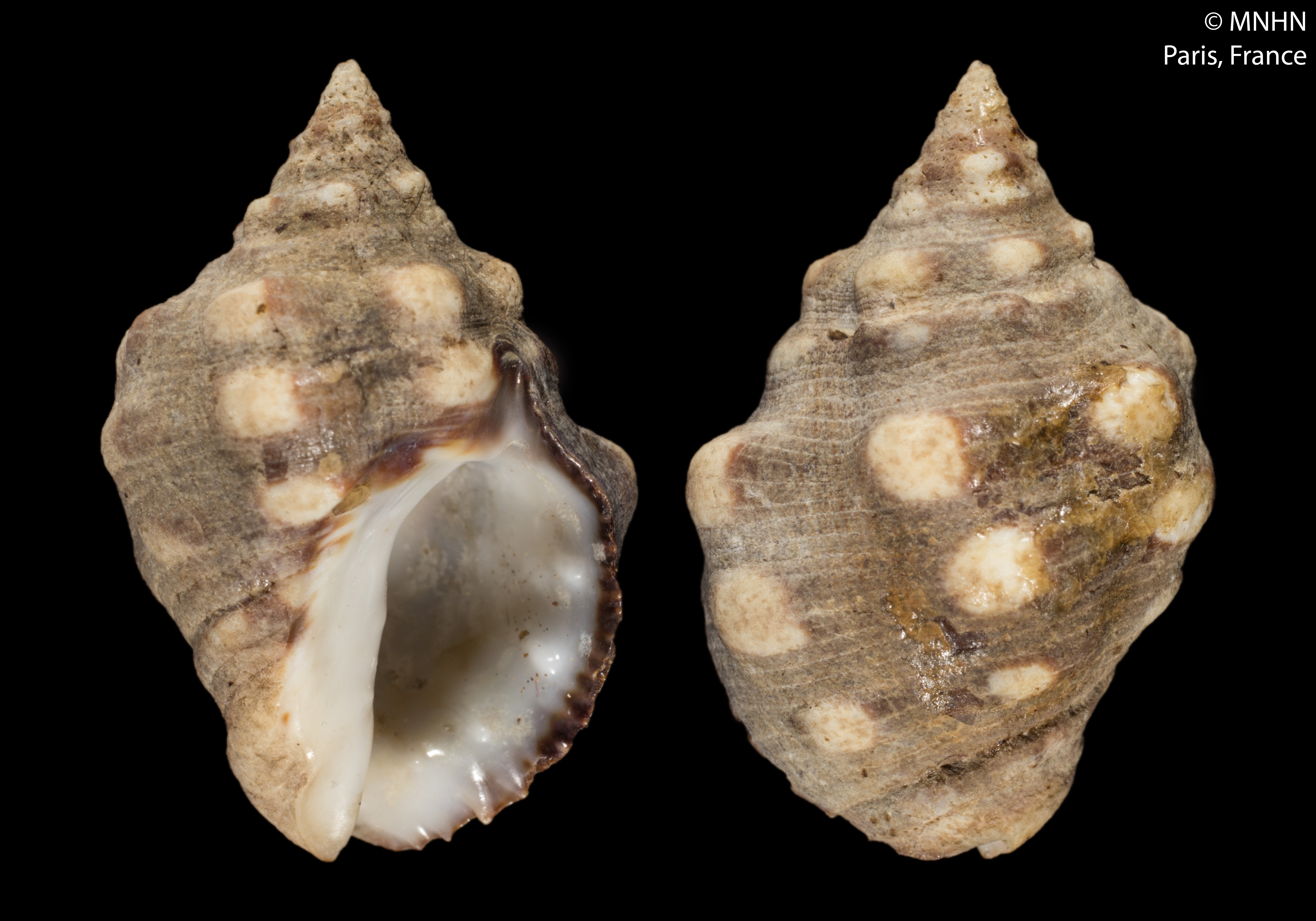
- Shell of Acanthais brevidentata (specimen at MNHN, paris)

Scientific classification
- Kingdom: Animalia
- Phylum: Mollusca
- Class: Gastropoda
- Subclass: Caenogastropoda
- Order: Neogastropoda
- Family: Muricidae
- Subfamily: Rapaninae
- Genus: Acanthais; Vermeij & Kool, 1994

= Acanthais =

Genus of gastropods

Acanthais is a genus of sea snails, marine gastropod mollusks in the family Muricidae, known as the murex snails or rock snails.

== Species ==
Species within the genus Acanthais include:

- Acanthais brevidentata (Wood, 1828)
