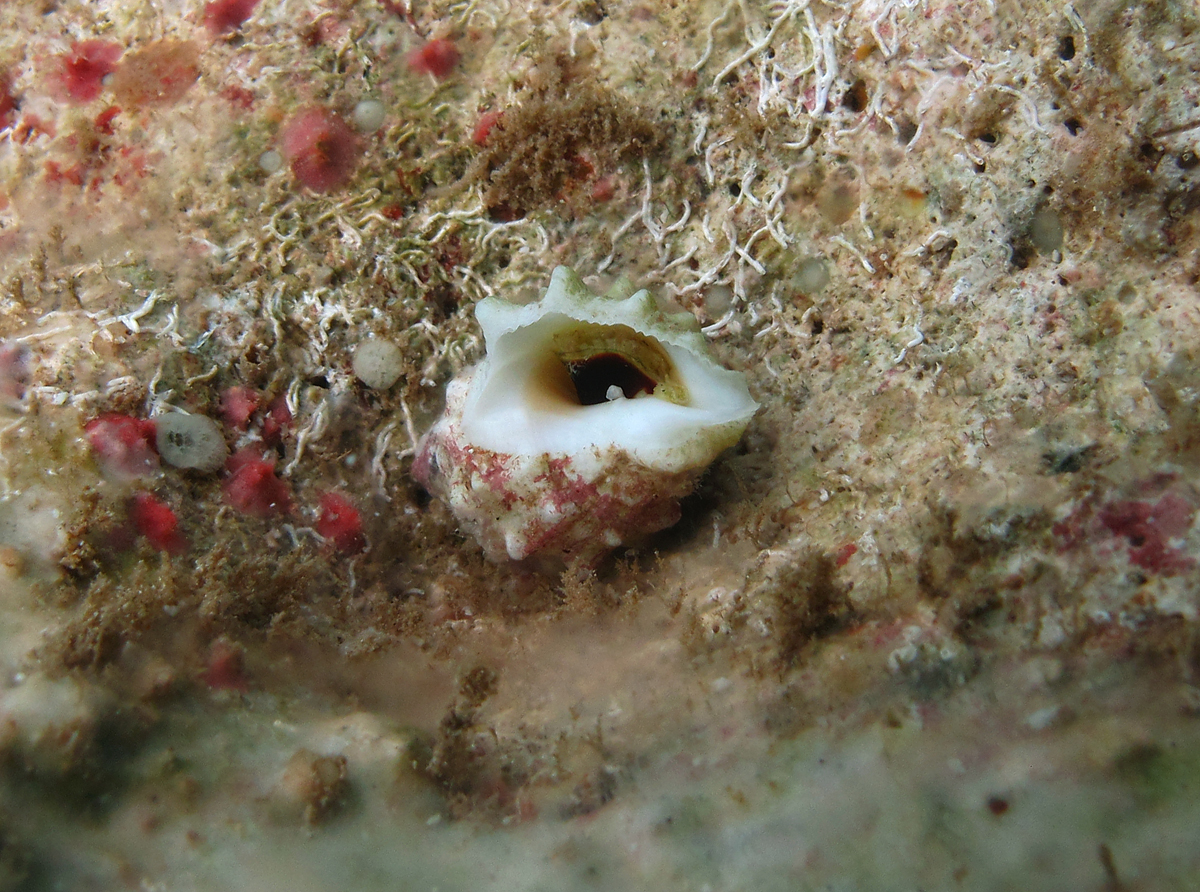
- Mancinella armigera

Scientific classification
- Kingdom: Animalia
- Phylum: Mollusca
- Class: Gastropoda
- Subclass: Caenogastropoda
- Order: Neogastropoda
- Superfamily: Muricoidea
- Family: Muricidae
- Subfamily: Rapaninae
- Genus: Mancinella; Link, 1807

Type species
- Murex mancinella (Linnaeus, 1758)

Synonyms
- Thais (Mancinella) Link, 1807

= Mancinella =

Genus of gastropods

Mancinella is a genus of sea snails, marine gastropod mollusks in the family Muricidae, the murex snails or rock snails.

== Species ==
Species within the genus Mancinella include:

- Mancinella alouina (Röding, 1798)
- Mancinella armigera Link, 1807
- Mancinella capensis (Petit de la Saussaye, 1852)
- † Mancinella dubia Selli, 1974
- Mancinella echinata (Blainville, 1832)
- Mancinella echinulata (Lamarck, 1822)
- Mancinella grossa (Houart, 2001)
- Mancinella herberti (Houart, 1998)
- Mancinella lata (Kuroda, 1931)
- Mancinella marmorata (Pease, 1865)
- Mancinella siro (Kuroda, 1931)
- † Mancinella striolata (Bronn, 1831)
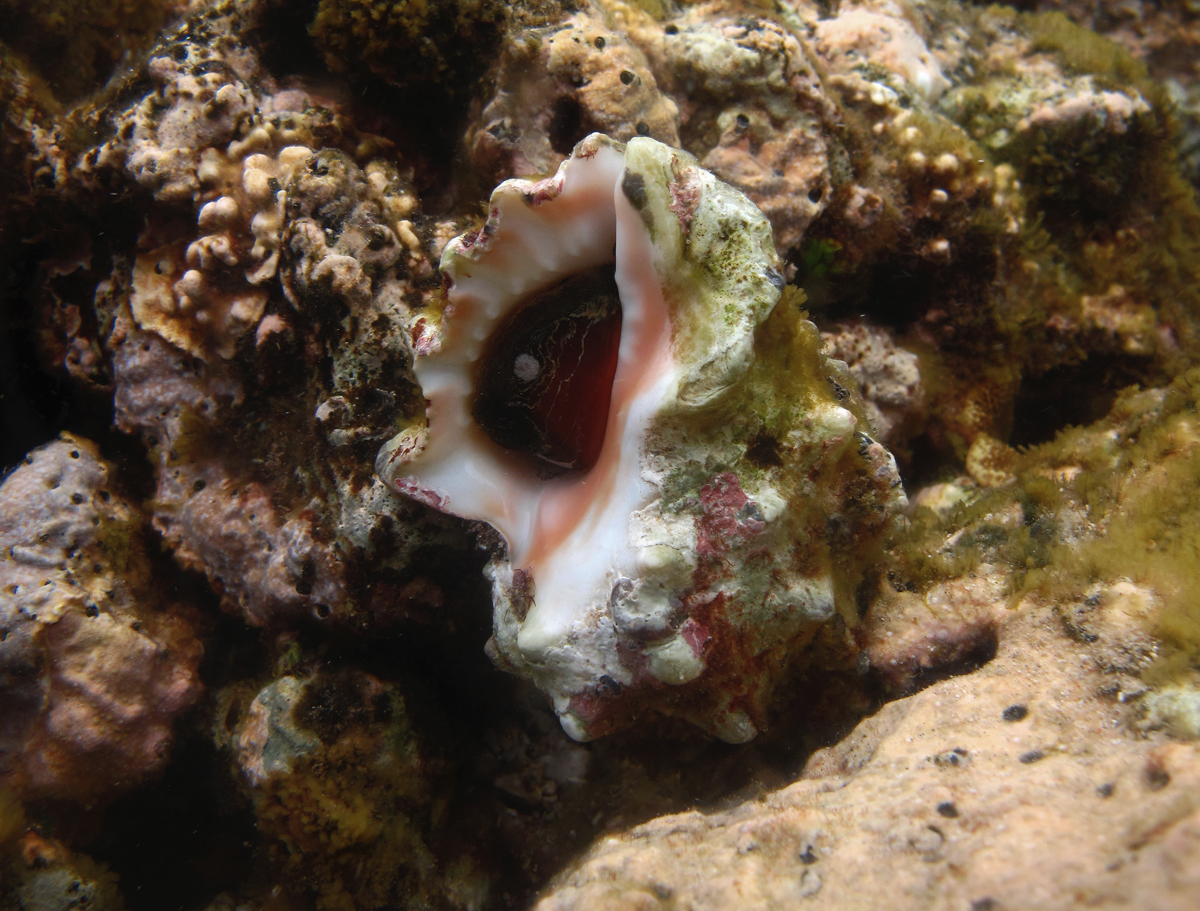
Mancinella armigera

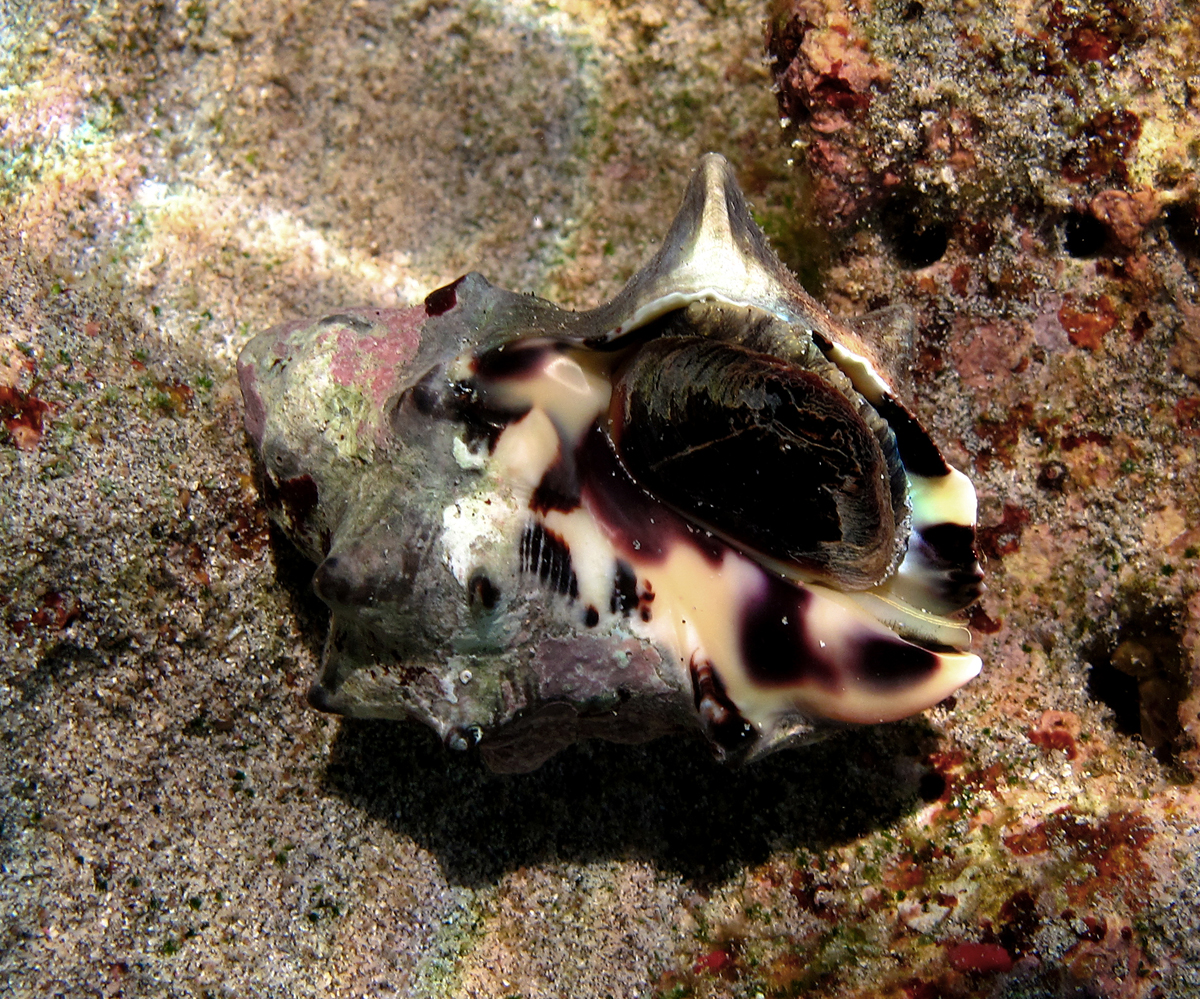
Mancinella tuberosa

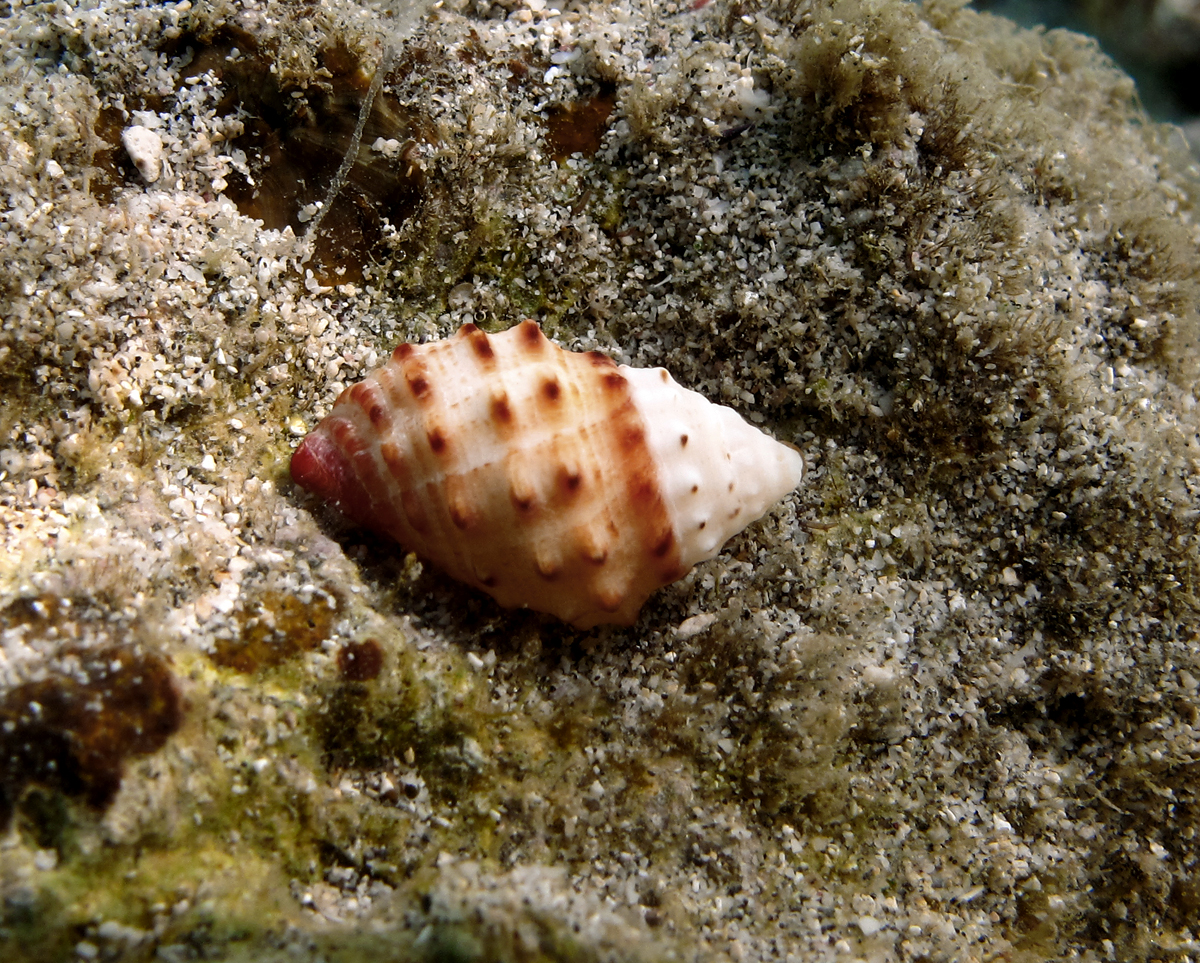
Mancinella sp.

Species brought into synonymy

- Mancinella aculeata Link, 1807: synonym of Mancinella alouina (Röding, 1798)
- Mancinella bufo (Lamarck, 1822): synonym of Purpura bufo Lamarck, 1822
- Mancinella deltoidea (Lamarck, 1822): synonym of Vasula deltoidea (Lamarck, 1822)
- Mancinella hippocastanum (Linnaeus, 1758): synonym of Thalessa virgata (Dillwyn, 1817)
- Mancinella kieneri [sic]: synonym of Mancinella kienerii (Deshayes, 1844): synonym of Reishia bitubercularis (Lamarck, 1822)
- Mancinella kienerii (Deshayes, 1844): synonym of Reishia bitubercularis (Lamarck, 1822)
- Mancinella mancinella (Linnaeus, 1758): synonym of Mancinella alouina (Röding, 1798)
- Mancinella mutabilis Link, 1807: synonym of Indothais lacera (Born, 1778)
- Mancinella squamosa (Pease, 1868): synonym of Semiricinula squamosa (Pease, 1868)
- Mancinella tuberosa (Röding, 1798): synonym of Menathais tuberosa (Röding, 1798)
