= Taurasia heteroclita =

Scientific classification
- Kingdom: Animalia
- Phylum: Mollusca
- Class: Gastropoda
- Subclass: Caenogastropoda
- Order: Neogastropoda
- Superfamily: Muricoidea
- Family: Muricidae
- Subfamily: Rapaninae
- Genus: Taurasia
- Species: †T. heteroclita

Binomial name
- †Taurasia heteroclita (Grateloup, 1845)

Synonyms
- † Purpurella canaliculata Bellardi, 1882; † Turbinella heteroclita Grateloup, 1845

Extinct species of gastropod

Taurasia heteroclita is an extinct species of sea snail, a marine gastropod mollusk, in the family Muricidae, the murex snails or rock snails.

== Distribution ==
This species occurs in the following locations:

- France
- Italy
