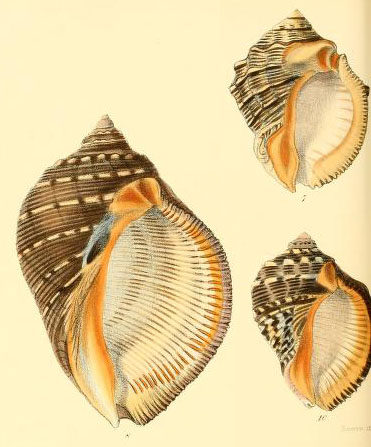
- Purpura bufo and 2 shells of Purpura persica (Lovell Augustus Reeve, 1843. Conchologia iconica, or, Illustrations of the shells of molluscous animals)

Scientific classification
- Kingdom: Animalia
- Phylum: Mollusca
- Class: Gastropoda
- Subclass: Caenogastropoda
- Order: Neogastropoda
- Family: Muricidae
- Subfamily: Rapaninae
- Genus: Purpura; Bruguière, 1789

Type species
- Buccinum persicum Linnaeus, 1758

Synonyms
- Purpura Martini, 1777

= Purpura (gastropod) =

Genus of gastropods

Purpura is a genus of sea snails, marine gastropod mollusks in the subfamily Rapaninae of the family Muricidae, the murex snails or rock snails.

Not to be confused with Purpura Jousseaume, 1880, a synonym of Bolinus Pusch, 1837

== Description ==
The genus Purpura is characterised by having large shells with large apertures, a concave columella and no external calcitic layer. The rachidian teeth have prominent marginal denticles.

The shell is oblong-oval, the body whorl large. The spire is short. The aperture is ovate, large, with an oblique channel or groove at the fore part. The columella is flattened. The outer lip is simple.

== Distribution ==
The Purpura and related genera inhabit the seas both of temperate and tropical climates. Many species produce a fluid which gives a dull crimson dye, whence their name of purple shells. Their egg-cases are membranous, oval or spheroidal, sometimes solitary, sometimes united in masses, each sac containing many embryos.

== Species ==
Species within the genus Purpura include:

- † Purpura angsanana K. Martin, 1899
- Purpura bufo Lamarck, 1822
- † Purpura dijki K. Martin, 1884
- Purpura panama (Röding, 1798)
- Purpura persica (Linnaeus, 1758)

Species brought into synonymy

In the course of time, several hundred species were included in the genus Purpura.

- Purpura hippocastanum Lamarck: synonym of Thais (Thalessa) virgata (Dillwyn, 1817)
- Purpura hystrix Linnaeus: synonym of Drupa (Drupa) ricinus (Linnaeus, 1758)
- Purpura lapillus (Linnaeus, 1758): synonym of Nucella lapillus (Linnaeus, 1758)
- Purpura mancinella (Linnaeus, 1758): synonym of Thais (Mancinella) alouina (Röding, 1798)
- Purpura nassoidea Blainville, 1832: synonym of Oppomorus noduliferus (Menke, 1829)
- Purpura nassoides Quoy & Gaimard, 1833: synonym of Oppomorus noduliferus (Menke, 1829)
- Purpura rudolphi Lamarck, 1822: synonym of Purpura persica (Linnaeus, 1758)
