= Taurasia subfusiformis =

Scientific classification
- Kingdom: Animalia
- Phylum: Mollusca
- Class: Gastropoda
- Subclass: Caenogastropoda
- Order: Neogastropoda
- Superfamily: Muricoidea
- Family: Muricidae
- Subfamily: Rapaninae
- Genus: Taurasia
- Species: †T. subfusiformis

Binomial name
- †Taurasia subfusiformis (d'Orbigny, 1852)

Synonyms
- † Purpura fusiformis Michelotti, 1847; † Purpura subfusiformis d'Orbigny, 1852; † Taurasia subfusiformis var. paucicostulata Sacco, 1890; † Taurasia subfusiformis var. profundecanaliculata Sacco, 1890

Extinct species of gastropod

Taurasia subfusiformis is an extinct species of sea snail, a marine gastropod mollusk, in the family Muricidae, the murex snails or rock snails.

== Distribution ==
This species occurs in the following locations:

- France
- Italy
