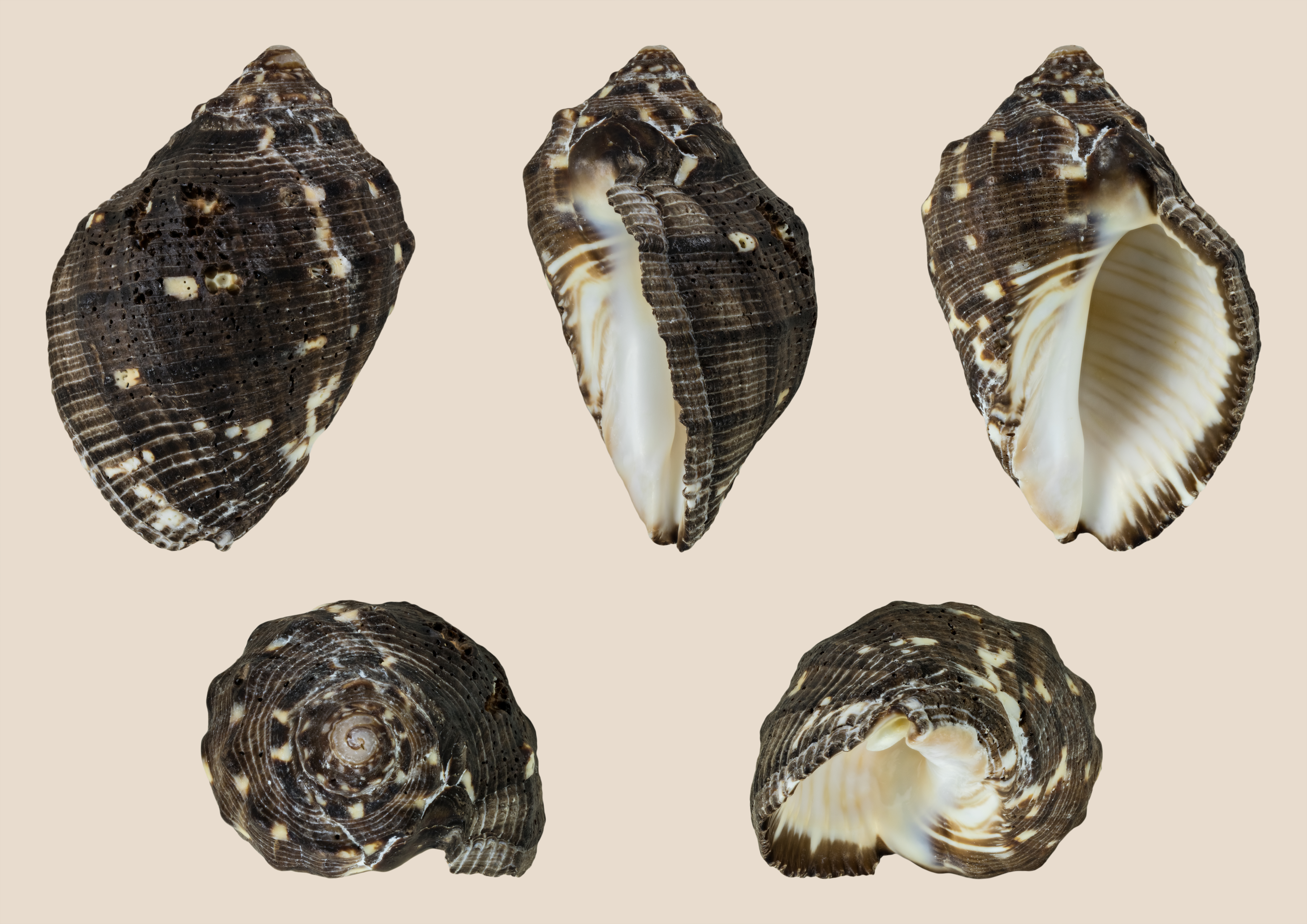

Scientific classification
- Kingdom: Animalia
- Phylum: Mollusca
- Class: Gastropoda
- Subclass: Caenogastropoda
- Order: Neogastropoda
- Superfamily: Muricoidea
- Family: Muricidae
- Subfamily: Rapaninae
- Genus: Purpura
- Species: P. panama

Binomial name
- Purpura panama (Röding, 1798)

Synonyms
- Thais panama Röding, 1798

= Purpura panama =

Species of gastropod

Purpura panama, common names Rudolph's purpura, salmon-lipped whelk, is a species of sea snail, a marine gastropod mollusk, in the family Muricidae, the murex snails or rock snails.

== Distribution ==
This species occurs in the following locations:

- East Coast of South Africa
- Mozambique
