= Mancinella echinulata =

- Shell of Mancinella echinulata (specimen at MNHN, Paris)

Scientific classification
- Kingdom: Animalia
- Phylum: Mollusca
- Class: Gastropoda
- Subclass: Caenogastropoda
- Order: Neogastropoda
- Superfamily: Muricoidea
- Family: Muricidae
- Subfamily: Rapaninae
- Genus: Mancinella
- Species: M. echinulata

Binomial name
- Mancinella echinulata (Lamarck, 1822)

Synonyms
- Purpura echinulata Lamarck, 1822; Purpura lischkei Küster, 1860; Purpura luteomarginata Montrouzier, 1861; Purpura mancinelloides Blainville, 1832; Thais (Mancinella) echinulata (Lamarck, 1822); Thais echinulata (Lamarck, 1822)

Species of gastropod

Mancinella echinulata, common names Lamarck's spiny rock shell, Lamarck's spiny rock snail, is a species of sea snail, a marine gastropod mollusk, in the family Muricidae, the murex snails or rock snails.

== Distribution ==
This marine species occurs off New Caledonia.
