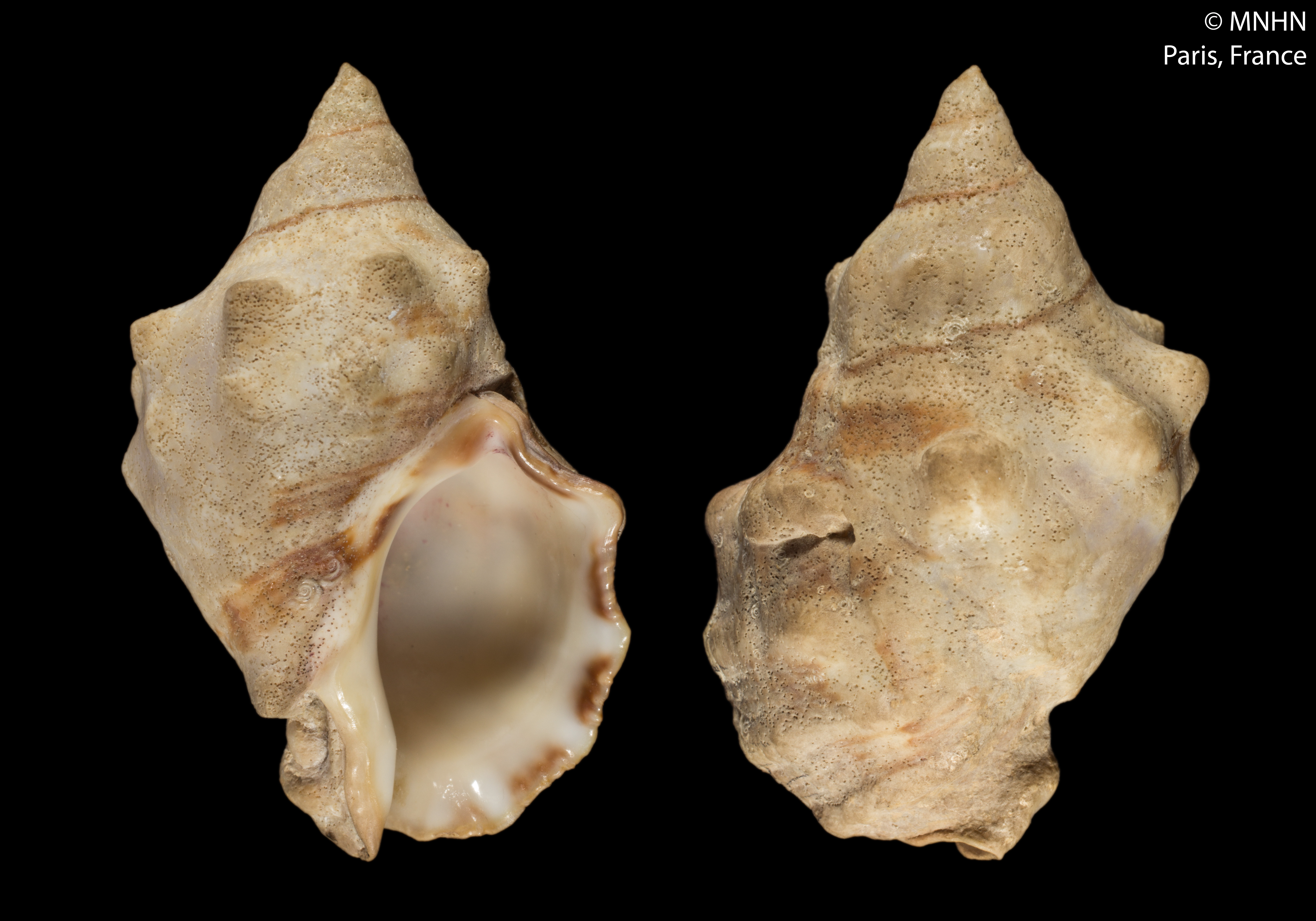
- Shell of Mancinella capensis (syntype at MNHN, Paris)

Scientific classification
- Kingdom: Animalia
- Phylum: Mollusca
- Class: Gastropoda
- Subclass: Caenogastropoda
- Order: Neogastropoda
- Superfamily: Muricoidea
- Family: Muricidae
- Subfamily: Rapaninae
- Genus: Mancinella
- Species: M. capensis

Binomial name
- Mancinella capensis (Petit de la Saussaye, 1852)

Synonyms
- Purpura capensis Petit de la Saussaye, 1852; Reishia capensis (Petit de la Saussaye, 1852); Thais albolineata W. H. Turton, 1932 (junior synonym); Thais capensis (Petit de la Saussaye, 1852)

= Mancinella capensis =

Species of gastropod

Mancinella capensis is a species of sea snail, a marine gastropod mollusk, in the family Muricidae, the murex snails or rock snails.
