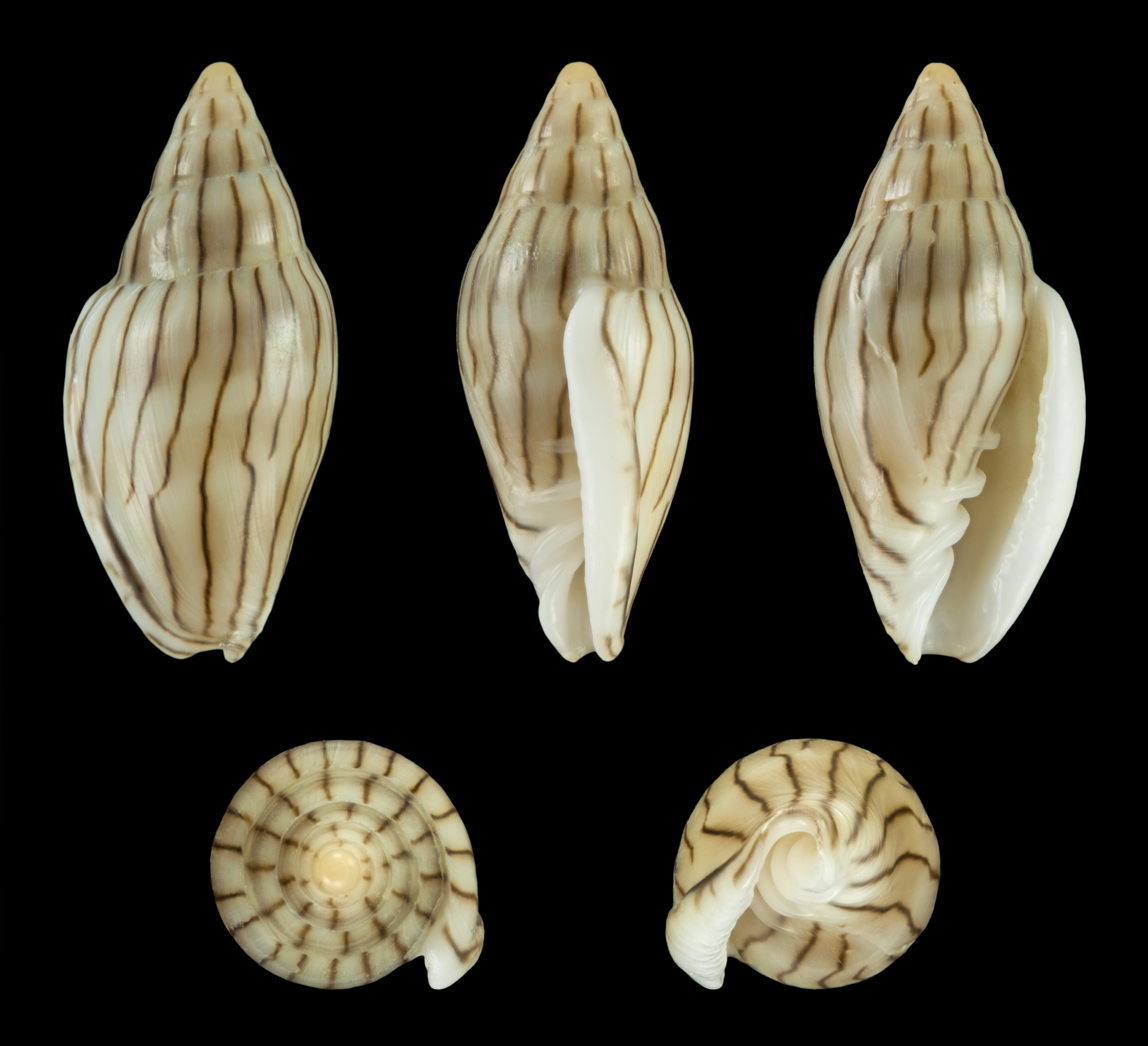
- Shell of Marginella cleryi (syntype at MNHN, Paris)

Scientific classification
- Kingdom: Animalia
- Phylum: Mollusca
- Class: Gastropoda
- Subclass: Caenogastropoda
- Order: Neogastropoda
- Family: Marginellidae
- Subfamily: Marginellinae
- Genus: Marginella
- Species: M. cleryi

Binomial name
- Marginella cleryi Petit de da Saussaye, 1836

Synonyms
- Marginella (Mordicamarginella) cleryi Petit de la Saussaye, 1836· accepted, alternate representation

= Marginella cleryi =

Species of gastropod

Marginella cleryi is a species of sea snail, a marine gastropod mollusk in the family Marginellidae, the margin snails.

== Description ==
The length of the shell attains 9 mm.

== Distribution ==
This marine species occurs off Senegal.
