= T. armigera =

T. armigera may refer to:

- Tetragnatha armigera, a synonym for Tetragnatha elongata-like, the elongate stilt spider, a spider species found in North and Central America, including Cuba and Jamaica
- Thais armigera, a sea snail species
- Turbinella armigera, a large sea snail species
