= Mancinella marmorata =

Scientific classification
- Kingdom: Animalia
- Phylum: Mollusca
- Class: Gastropoda
- Subclass: Caenogastropoda
- Order: Neogastropoda
- Superfamily: Muricoidea
- Family: Muricidae
- Subfamily: Rapaninae
- Genus: Mancinella
- Species: M. marmorata

Binomial name
- Mancinella marmorata (Pease, 1865)

Synonyms
- Purpura marmorata Pease, 1865; Thais (Mancinella) marmorata (Pease, 1865)

Species of gastropod

Mancinella marmorata is a species of sea snail, a marine gastropod mollusk, in the family Muricidae, which are murex snails or rock snails. It is found in the Cook Islands and Kiribati. In 1865, William Harper Pease discovered the species and named it Purpura marmorata.
