= Mancinella siro =

Scientific classification
- Kingdom: Animalia
- Phylum: Mollusca
- Class: Gastropoda
- Subclass: Caenogastropoda
- Order: Neogastropoda
- Superfamily: Muricoidea
- Family: Muricidae
- Subfamily: Rapaninae
- Genus: Mancinella
- Species: M. siro

Binomial name
- Mancinella siro (Kuroda, 1931)

Synonyms
- Thais (Mancinella) siro Kuroda, 1931; Thais siro Kuroda, 1931

Species of gastropod

Mancinella siro is a species of sea snail, a marine gastropod mollusk, in the family Muricidae, the murex snails or rock snails.
