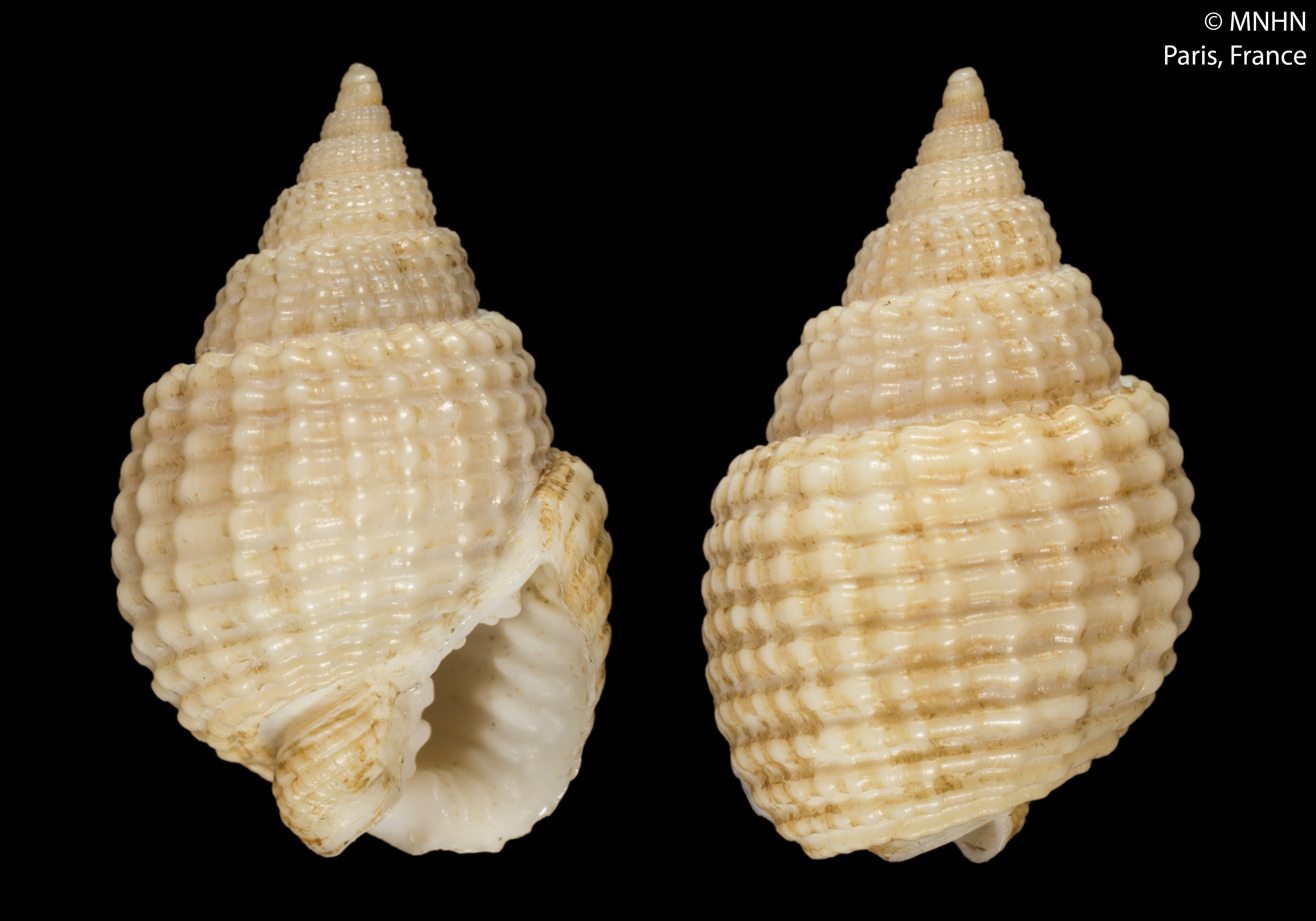
- Shell of Nassarius webbei (holotype at MNHN, Paris)

Scientific classification
- Kingdom: Animalia
- Phylum: Mollusca
- Class: Gastropoda
- Subclass: Caenogastropoda
- Order: Neogastropoda
- Family: Nassariidae
- Genus: Nassarius
- Species: N. webbei

Binomial name
- Nassarius webbei (Petit, 1850)

= Nassarius webbei =

Species of gastropod

Nassarius webbei is a species of sea snail, a marine gastropod mollusk in the family Nassariidae, the Nassa mud snails or dog whelks.

== Description ==
The shell grows to a length of 17 mm.

== Distribution ==
This species occurs in the Atlantic Ocean off Cape Verde Islands and Senegal.
