= Taurasia coronata =

Scientific classification
- Kingdom: Animalia
- Phylum: Mollusca
- Class: Gastropoda
- Subclass: Caenogastropoda
- Order: Neogastropoda
- Superfamily: Muricoidea
- Family: Muricidae
- Subfamily: Rapaninae
- Genus: Taurasia
- Species: †T. coronata

Binomial name
- †Taurasia coronata Bellardi, 1882

Synonyms
- † Taurasia coronata var. pernodulosa Sacco, 1890

Extinct species of gastropod

Taurasia coronata is an extinct species of sea snail, a marine gastropod mollusk, in the family Muricidae, the murex snails or rock snails.

== Distribution ==
This species occurs in the following locations:

- France
- Italy
