= Taurasia (disambiguation) =

Taurasia may refer to:

- Taurasia, a genus of gastropods
- Taurasia, the ancient capital of Taurini, nearby modern Turin in Northern Italy
- Taurasia (or Taurasia Cisauna) – an ancient city of Samnites, northeast of Benevento in Southern Italy
