= Agnewia adelaidae =

Scientific classification
- Kingdom: Animalia
- Phylum: Mollusca
- Class: Gastropoda
- Subclass: Caenogastropoda
- Order: Neogastropoda
- Superfamily: Muricoidea
- Family: Muricidae
- Subfamily: Rapaninae
- Genus: Agnewia
- Species: A. adelaidae

Binomial name
- Agnewia adelaidae (A. Adams & Angas, 1863)

Synonyms
- Adamsia adelaidae A. Adams & Angas, 1863

Species of gastropod

Agnewia adelaidae is a species of sea snail, a marine gastropod mollusk, in the family Muricidae, the murex snails or rock snails.
