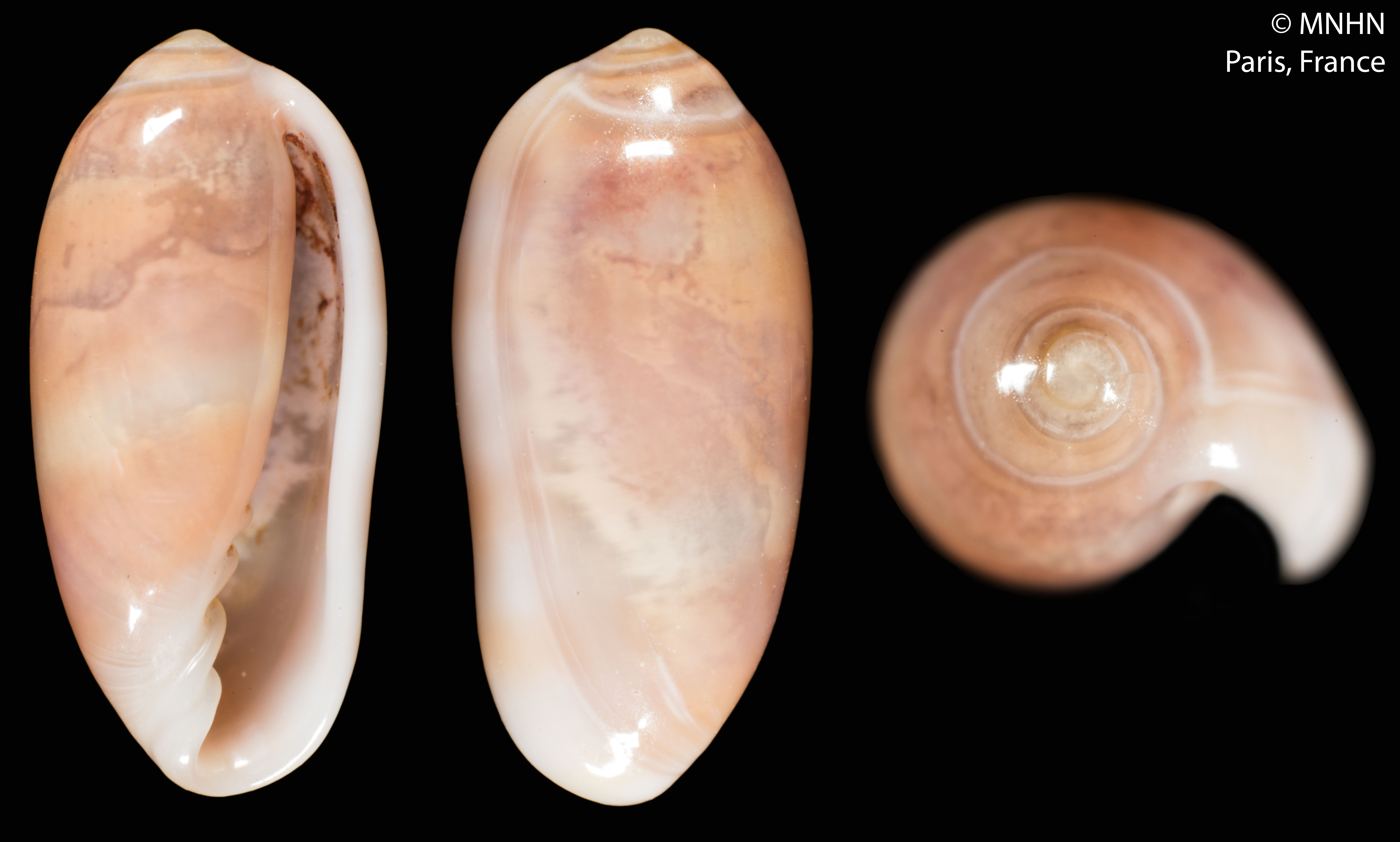
- Shell of Volvarina micans (lectotype at MNHN, Paris)

Scientific classification
- Kingdom: Animalia
- Phylum: Mollusca
- Class: Gastropoda
- Subclass: Caenogastropoda
- Order: Neogastropoda
- Family: Marginellidae
- Subfamily: Marginellinae
- Genus: Volvarina
- Species: V. micans

Binomial name
- Volvarina micans (Petit de la Saussaye, 1851)

Synonyms
- Marginella micans Petit de la Saussaye, 1851 (original combination)

= Volvarina micans =

Species of gastropod

Volvarina micans is a species of sea snail, a marine gastropod mollusk in the family Marginellidae, the margin snails.

== Description ==
The length of the shell attains 8 mm, its diameter 4 mm.

(Original description in French) The shell has an oblong oval, sub-cylindrical shape. It is very shiny and is of a fawn shaded with pink. The shell consists of four to five whorls.The body whorl shows two whitish horizontally striped bands. The whorls are short and convex. The aperture is very narrow, but becomes a little wider at the base. The base of the columella is white, and contains four well-marked oblique plaits. The outer lip has a fairly pronounced rim, its edge is smooth and straight, and is a little compressed in the middle. It presents two whitened spots, which are the extension of the horizontal bands of the body whorl.

== Distribution ==
This marine species occurs in the Red Sea.
