= Edithais pehuensis =

Scientific classification
- Kingdom: Animalia
- Phylum: Mollusca
- Class: Gastropoda
- Subclass: Caenogastropoda
- Order: Neogastropoda
- Superfamily: Muricoidea
- Family: Muricidae
- Subfamily: Rapaninae
- Genus: †Edithais
- Species: †E. pehuensis

Binomial name
- †Edithais pehuensis (Marwick, 1926)

Synonyms
- † Lippistes pehuensis Marwick, 1926

Extinct species of gastropod

Edithais pehuensis is an extinct species of sea snail, a marine gastropod mollusk, in the family Muricidae, the murex snails or rock snails.

== Distribution ==
This species occurs in New Zealand.
