= Taurasia pleurotoma =

Scientific classification
- Kingdom: Animalia
- Phylum: Mollusca
- Class: Gastropoda
- Subclass: Caenogastropoda
- Order: Neogastropoda
- Superfamily: Muricoidea
- Family: Muricidae
- Subfamily: Rapaninae
- Genus: Taurasia
- Species: †T. pleurotoma

Binomial name
- †Taurasia pleurotoma (Grateloup, 1832)

Synonyms
- † Taurasia pleurotoma var. infundibulata Cossmann & Peyrot, 1924; † Turbinella multistriata Grateloup, 1845; † Turbinella pleurotoma Grateloup, 1832; † Turbinella pleurotoma var. minor Grateloup, 1845

Extinct species of gastropod

Taurasia pleurotoma is an extinct species of sea snail, a marine gastropod mollusk, in the family Muricidae, the murex snails or rock snails.

== Distribution ==
This species occurs in the following locations:

- France
- Italy
