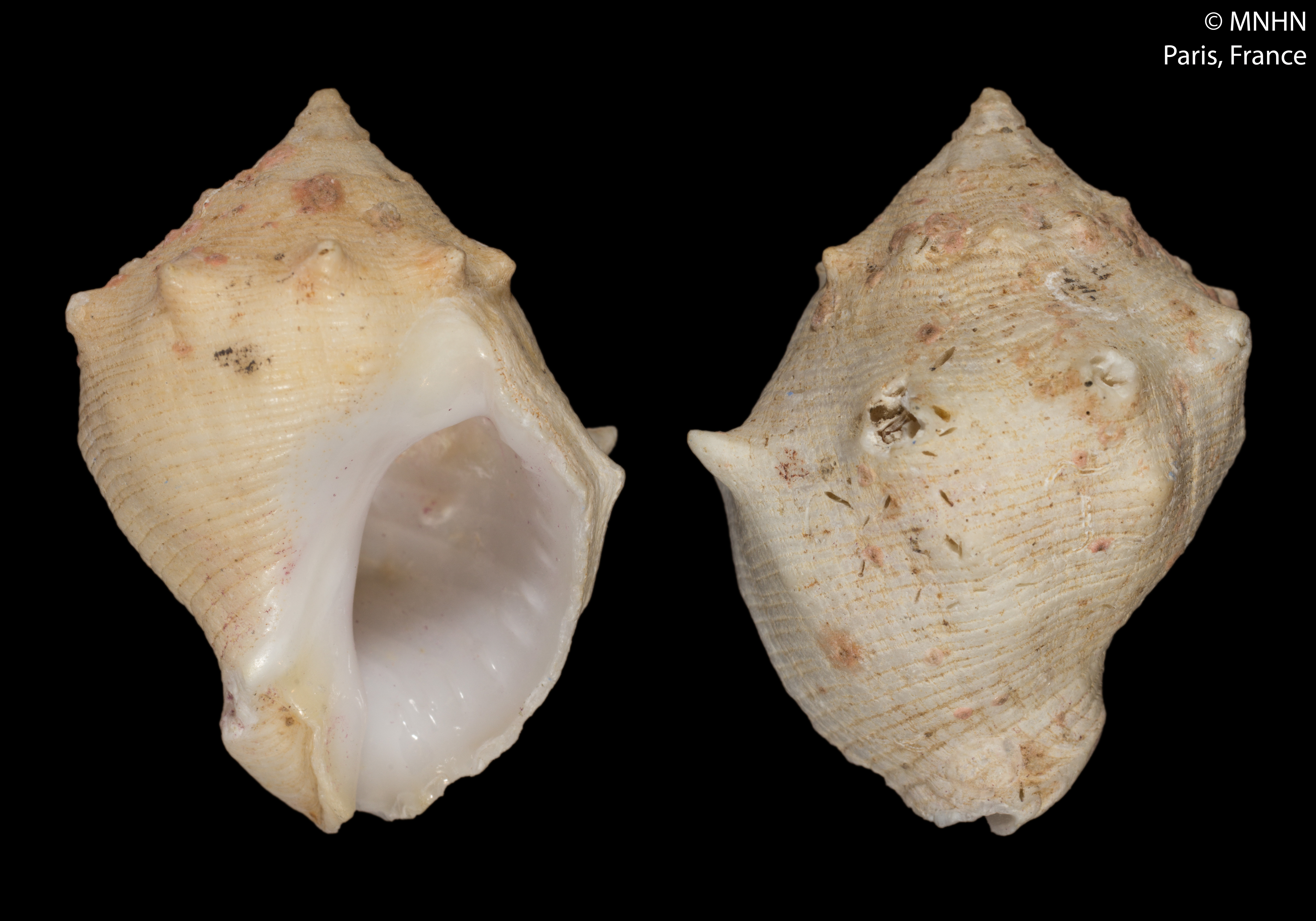
- Shell of Mancinella grossa (holotype at MNHN, Paris)

Scientific classification
- Kingdom: Animalia
- Phylum: Mollusca
- Class: Gastropoda
- Subclass: Caenogastropoda
- Order: Neogastropoda
- Superfamily: Muricoidea
- Family: Muricidae
- Subfamily: Rapaninae
- Genus: Mancinella
- Species: M. grossa

Binomial name
- Mancinella grossa (Houart, 2001)

Synonyms
- Thais (Mancinella) grossa Houart, 2001

= Mancinella grossa =

Species of gastropod

Mancinella grossa is a species of sea snail, a marine gastropod mollusk, in the family Muricidae, the murex snails or rock snails.

== Description ==
The length of the shell is roughly 37.4 mm.

== Distribution ==
This marine species is found off the coast of Vanuatu.
