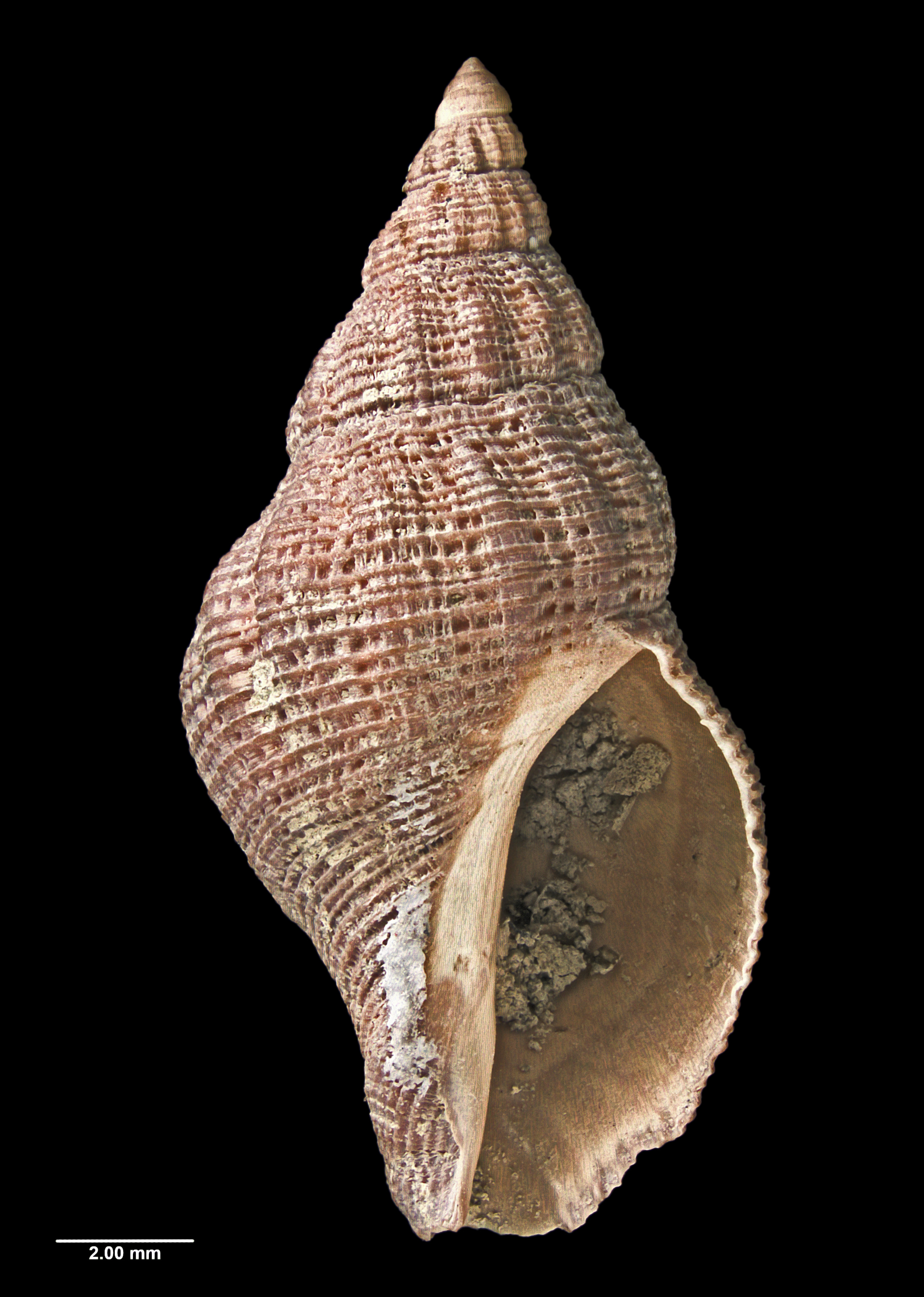
- Holotype from Auckland War Memorial Museum

Scientific classification
- Kingdom: Animalia
- Phylum: Mollusca
- Class: Gastropoda
- Subclass: Caenogastropoda
- Order: Neogastropoda
- Family: Muricidae
- Genus: Agnewia
- Species: †A. kempae

Binomial name
- †Agnewia kempae A. W. B. Powell, 1934

= Agnewia kempae =

Agnewia kempae Temporal range: Late Pleistocene

Extinct species of gastropod

Agnewia kempae is an extinct species of sea snail, a marine gastropod mollusc, in the family Muricidae, the murex snails or rock snails. Fossils of the species date to the Late Pleistocene, and occur in the strata of Te Piki in the eastern Bay of Plenty, New Zealand.

== Description ==
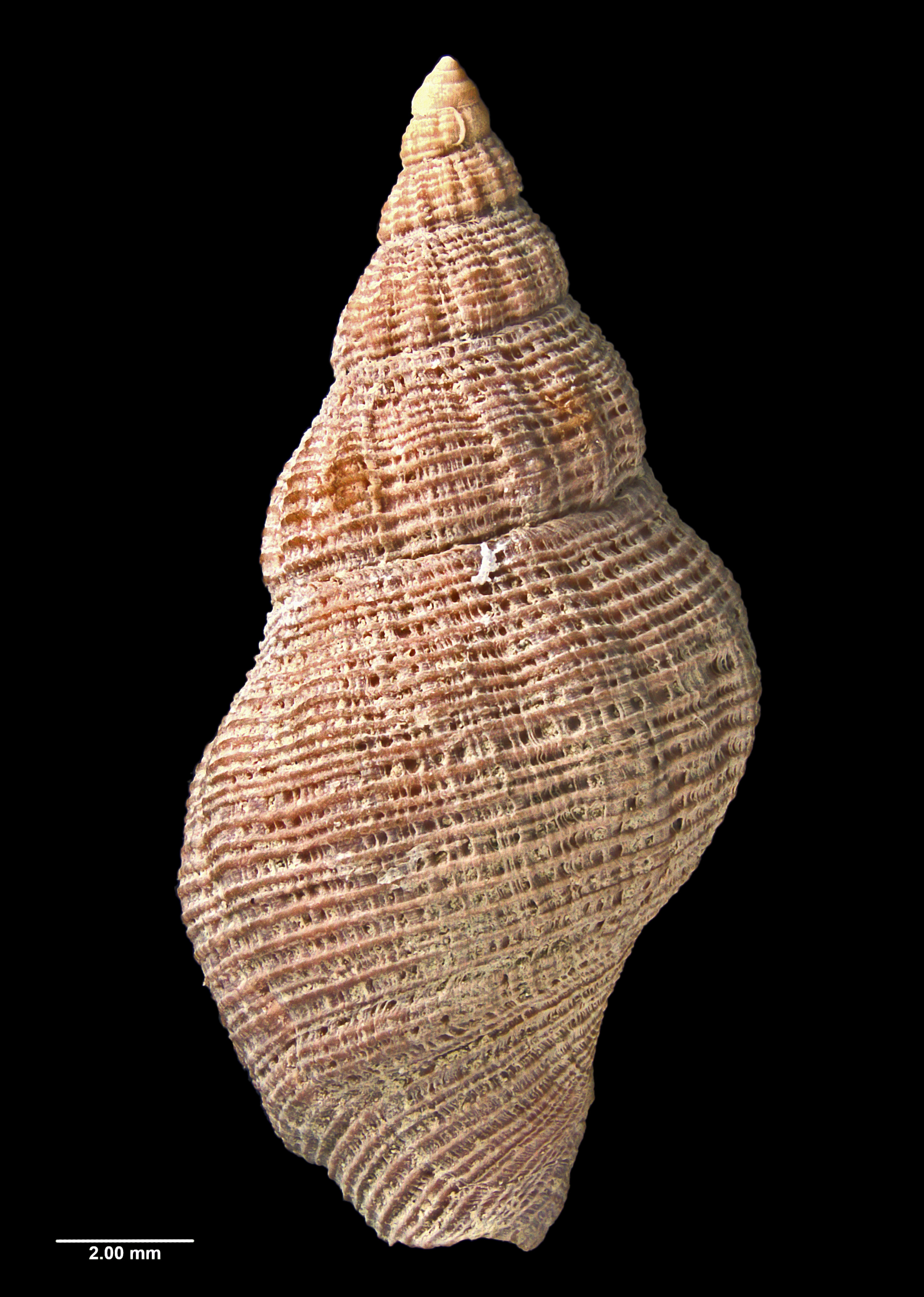
Reverse view of holotype

In the original description, Powell described the species as follows:

Shell small, fusiform rather thin. Whorls 8, including a typical four-whorled sinusigera protoconch. Sculpture consisting of broad, low, obscure axial folds crossed by fine, crisp, sharply-raised spiral cords. These cords number five on the first post-nuclear whorl, eight upon the third post-nuclear, twelve upon the penultimate, and about forty upon the body-whorl and base. The interspaces are mostly from one and a-half times to twice the width of the cords. The axials number thirteen per whorl and are most distinct upon the earlier whorls. Spire elevated, conic, about same height as aperture; outline sinuous, generally arcuate, but slightly concave just below suture. Aperture subvertical, narrowly ovate, with a very short, straight and open shallowly notched anterior canal. Parietal and columella callus polished, slightly countersunk. Fasciole defined by a strong rounded ridge and sculptured with fine, closely spaced spiral threads. Outer lip thin and sharp.

The holotype of the species measures 18 mm (0.71 in) in height and 8.5 mm (0.33 in) in diameter. The species has less prominent axials and more widely spaced and sharply raised spirals relative to Agnewia tritoniformis, and has a rounded, protruding nodule on the outer lip similar in appearance to a "stromboid notch", something not found in A. tritoniformis.

The species has short, blunt labral teeth that form at the end of its spinal cord, and is small and have a moderately elongated shell relative to other members of Muricidae. Fossils are coloured buff-brown.

== Ecology ==
The species lived in New Zealand at a time when the climate was much warmer than the current day.

== Taxonomy ==
The species was first described by A.W.B. Powell in 1934, who named the species after the Dory Kemp (née May), wife of Alfred Ernest Kemp, who lived at Cape Runaway. The holotype was collected by Powell in August 1933 from 6 km (3.7 mi) east of Cape Runaway in the Bay of Plenty Region, and is held by the Auckland War Memorial Museum.

The species likely represents a population of Agnewia tritoniformis which spread from Australia, then becoming genetically isolated and evolving into a distinct species.

== Distribution ==
This extinct marine species dates to the Late Pleistocene (Haweran), and is only known to occur in the strata of the Waipaoa Formation (Te Piki Member), in the eastern Bay of Plenty, New Zealand.
