= Mancinella herberti =

Scientific classification
- Kingdom: Animalia
- Phylum: Mollusca
- Class: Gastropoda
- Subclass: Caenogastropoda
- Order: Neogastropoda
- Superfamily: Muricoidea
- Family: Muricidae
- Subfamily: Rapaninae
- Genus: Mancinella
- Species: M. herberti

Binomial name
- Mancinella herberti (Houart, 1998)

Synonyms
- Thais (Mancinella) herberti Houart, 1998

Species of gastropod

Mancinella herberti is a species of sea snail, a marine gastropod mollusk, in the family Muricidae, the murex snails or rock snails. This species is not extinct. This species lives in Kwa-Zulu, South Africa.

== Description ==
The length of the shell attains 33 mm and it lives in different shells.

== Distribution ==
This marine species occurs off KwaZulu-Natal, South Africa.
