= Edithais =

Scientific classification
- Kingdom: Animalia
- Phylum: Mollusca
- Class: Gastropoda
- Subclass: Caenogastropoda
- Order: Neogastropoda
- Superfamily: Muricoidea
- Family: Muricidae
- Subfamily: Rapaninae
- Genus: †Edithais; Vermeij, 1998

Extinct genus of gastropods

Edithais is an extinct genus of sea snails, marine gastropod mollusks, in the family Muricidae, the murex snails or rock snails.

== Species ==
Species within the genus Edithais include:

- † Edithais pehuensis (Marwick, 1926)
