= Volvarina sowerbyana =

Scientific classification
- Kingdom: Animalia
- Phylum: Mollusca
- Class: Gastropoda
- Subclass: Caenogastropoda
- Order: Neogastropoda
- Family: Marginellidae
- Subfamily: Marginellinae
- Genus: Volvarina
- Species: V. sowerbyana

Binomial name
- Volvarina sowerbyana (Petit de la Saussaye, 1851)

Synonyms
- Marginella sowerbyana Petit de la Saussaye, 1851 (original combination); Prunum sowerbyanum (Petit de la Saussaye, 1851)

Species of gastropod

Volvarina sowerbyana is a species of sea snail, a marine gastropod mollusk in the family Marginellidae, the margin snails.
