= Mancinella echinata =

Scientific classification
- Kingdom: Animalia
- Phylum: Mollusca
- Class: Gastropoda
- Subclass: Caenogastropoda
- Order: Neogastropoda
- Superfamily: Muricoidea
- Family: Muricidae
- Subfamily: Rapaninae
- Genus: Mancinella
- Species: M. echinata

Binomial name
- Mancinella echinata (Blainville, 1832)

Synonyms
- Purpura echinata Blainville, 1832; Thais (Mancinella) echinata (Blainville, 1832)

Species of gastropod

Mancinella echinata, common names prickly rock shell, prickly rock snail, is a species of sea snail, a marine gastropod mollusk, in the family Muricidae, the murex snails or rock snails.
