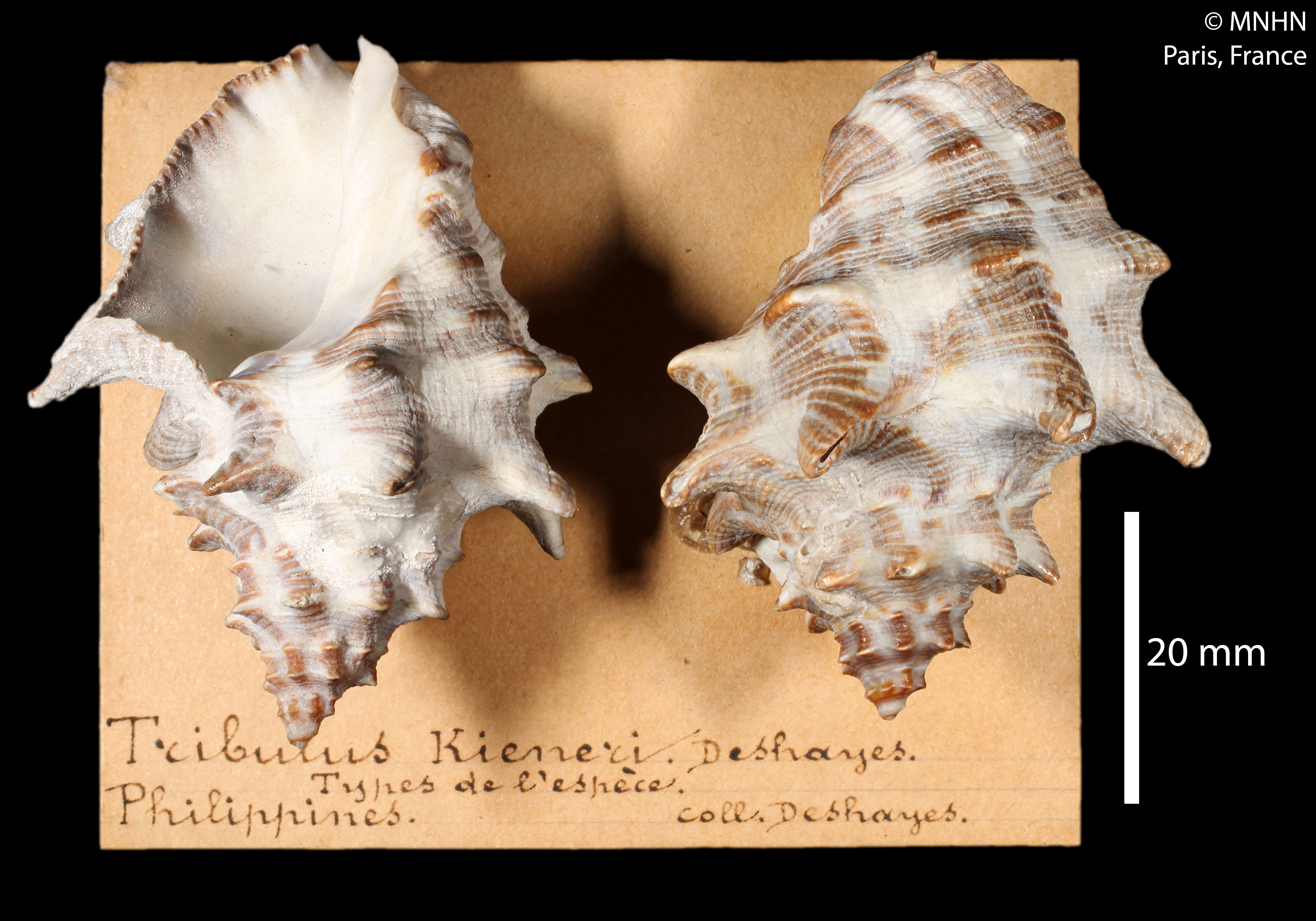

Scientific classification
- Kingdom: Animalia
- Phylum: Mollusca
- Class: Gastropoda
- Subclass: Caenogastropoda
- Order: Neogastropoda
- Superfamily: Muricoidea
- Family: Muricidae
- Subfamily: Rapaninae
- Genus: Reishia
- Species: R. bitubercularis

Binomial name
- Reishia bitubercularis (Lamarck, 1822)

Synonyms
- Mancinella kieneri [sic]; Mancinella kienerii (Deshayes, 1844); Purpura bitubercularis Lamarck, 1822; Purpura cuspidata Adams & Reeve, 1848; Purpura imperialis Blainville, 1832; Purpura kienerii Deshayes, 1844; Purpura undata Lamarck, 1822; Thais (Thalessa) bitubercularis (Lamarck, 1822); Thais bitubercularis (Lamarck, 1822); Thais kieneri [sic]; Thais kienerii (Deshayes, 1844); Thais undata (Lamarck, 1822)

= Reishia bitubercularis =

Species of gastropod

Reishia bitubercularis, common names bituberculate rock shell, bituberculate rock snail, chestnut rock shell, is a species of sea snail, a marine gastropod mollusk, in the family Muricidae, the murex snails or rock snails.

== Description ==
The length of the shell attains 45 mm.

== Distribution ==
This marine species occurs off the Philippines.
