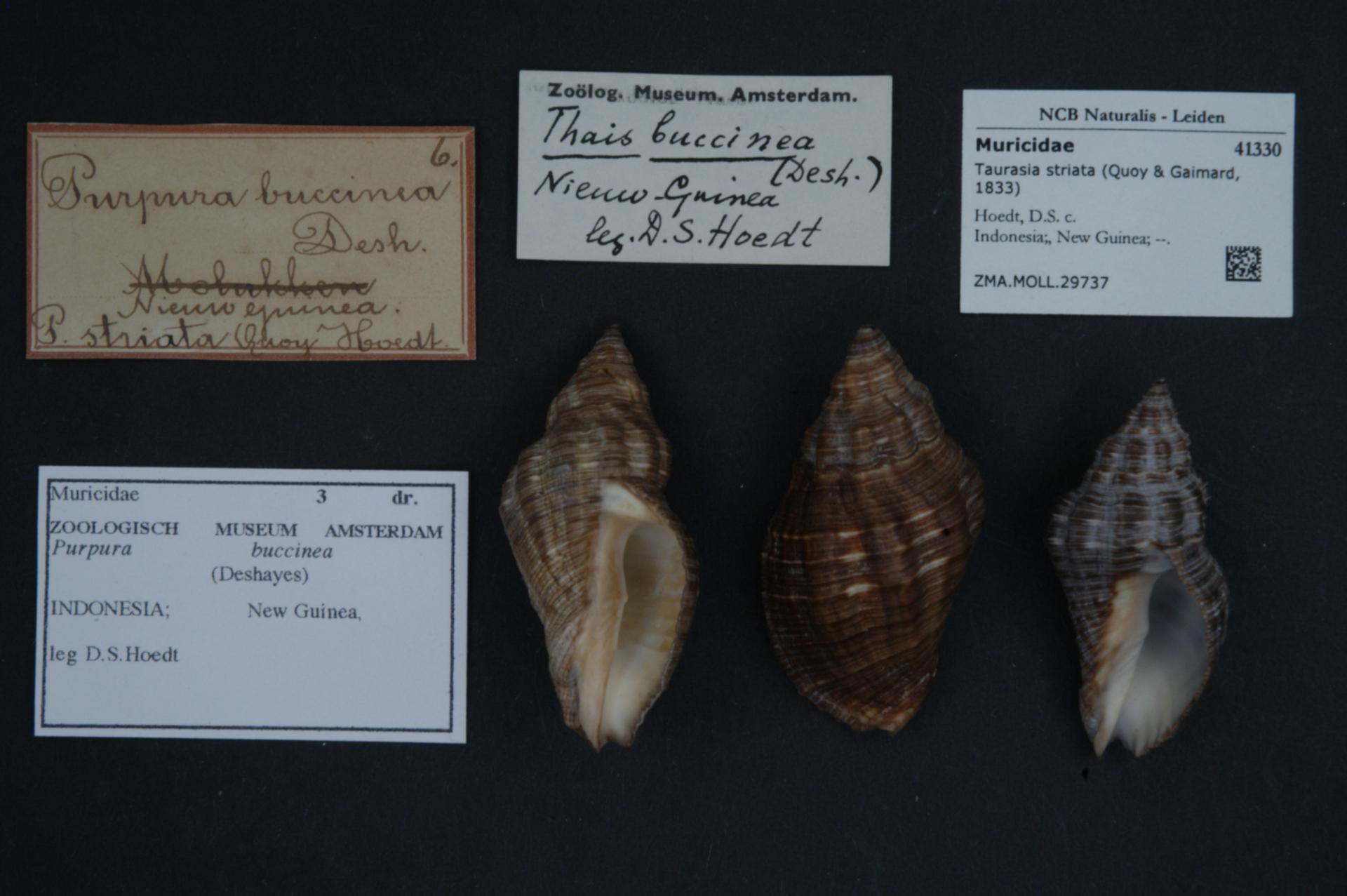

Scientific classification
- Kingdom: Animalia
- Phylum: Mollusca
- Class: Gastropoda
- Subclass: Caenogastropoda
- Order: Neogastropoda
- Family: Muricidae
- Genus: Taurasia
- Species: T. striata

Binomial name
- Taurasia striata (Quoy & Gaimard, 1833)

Synonyms
- Buccinum strigosum Gmelin, 1791; Purpura buccinea Deshayes, 1844; Purpura flammea Mörch, 1852; Purpura striata Quoy & Gaimard, 1833; Purpura striata Blainville, 1832(original combination); † Taurasia niasensis Beets, 1985; Thais buccinea (Deshayes, 1844)

= Taurasia striata =

Species of gastropod

Taurasia striata is a species of sea snail, a marine gastropod mollusc in the family Muricidae, the murex or rock snails.

== Description ==
The length of the shell attains 45 mm.

== Distribution ==
This marine species occurs off New Guinea.
