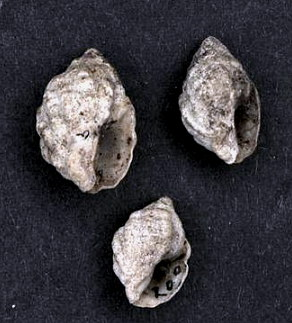
- Oppomorus noduliferus

Scientific classification
- Kingdom: Animalia
- Phylum: Mollusca
- Class: Gastropoda
- Subclass: Caenogastropoda
- Order: Neogastropoda
- Family: Muricidae
- Subfamily: Ergalataxinae
- Genus: Oppomorus; Iredale, 1937

Type species
- Purpura nodulifera Menke, 1829

Synonyms
- Morula (Oppomorus) Iredale, 1937

= Oppomorus =

Genus of gastropods

Oppomorus is a genus of sea snails, marine gastropod mollusks in the family Muricidae, the murex snails or rock snails.

== Species ==
Species within the genus Oppomorus include:

- Oppomorus funiculatus (Reeve, 1846)
- Oppomorus noduliferus (Menke, 1829)
- Oppomorus purpureocinctus (Preston, 1909)

== Distribution ==
This marine genus is endemic to Australia and occurs off New South Wales, Queensland, Western Australia.
