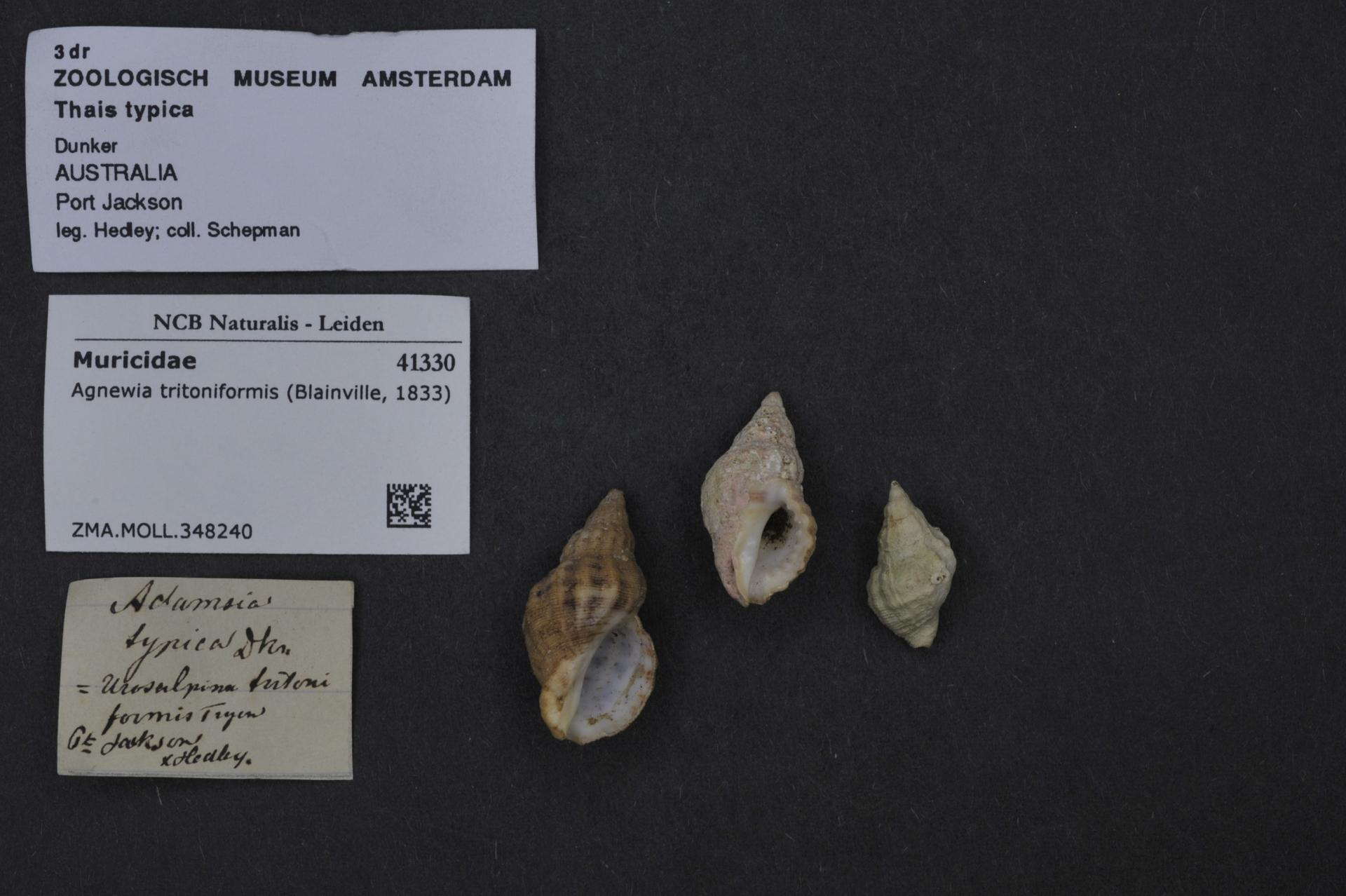
- Agnewia tritoniformis shells

Scientific classification
- Kingdom: Animalia
- Phylum: Mollusca
- Class: Gastropoda
- Subclass: Caenogastropoda
- Order: Neogastropoda
- Superfamily: Muricoidea
- Family: Muricidae
- Subfamily: Rapaninae
- Genus: Agnewia; Tenison Woods, 1878

Type species
- Adamsia typica Dunker, 1857

Species
- See text

Synonyms
- * Adamsia Dunker, 1857 (Invalid: junior homonym of Adamsia Forbes, 1840 [Cnidaria]; Agnewia is a replacement name); Cheletropis Forbes, 1852

= Agnewia =

Genus of gastropods

Agnewia is a genus of sea snails, marine gastropod mollusks in the family Muricidae, the murex snails or rock snails.

== Species ==
Species within the genus Agnewia include:

- Agnewia adelaidae (A. Adams & Angas, 1863)
- † Agnewia kempae Powell, 1934
- Agnewia tritoniformis (Blainville, 1833)

Species brought into synonymy

- Agnewia nautica Thornley, 1952: synonym of Agnewia tritoniformis (Blainville, 1832)
