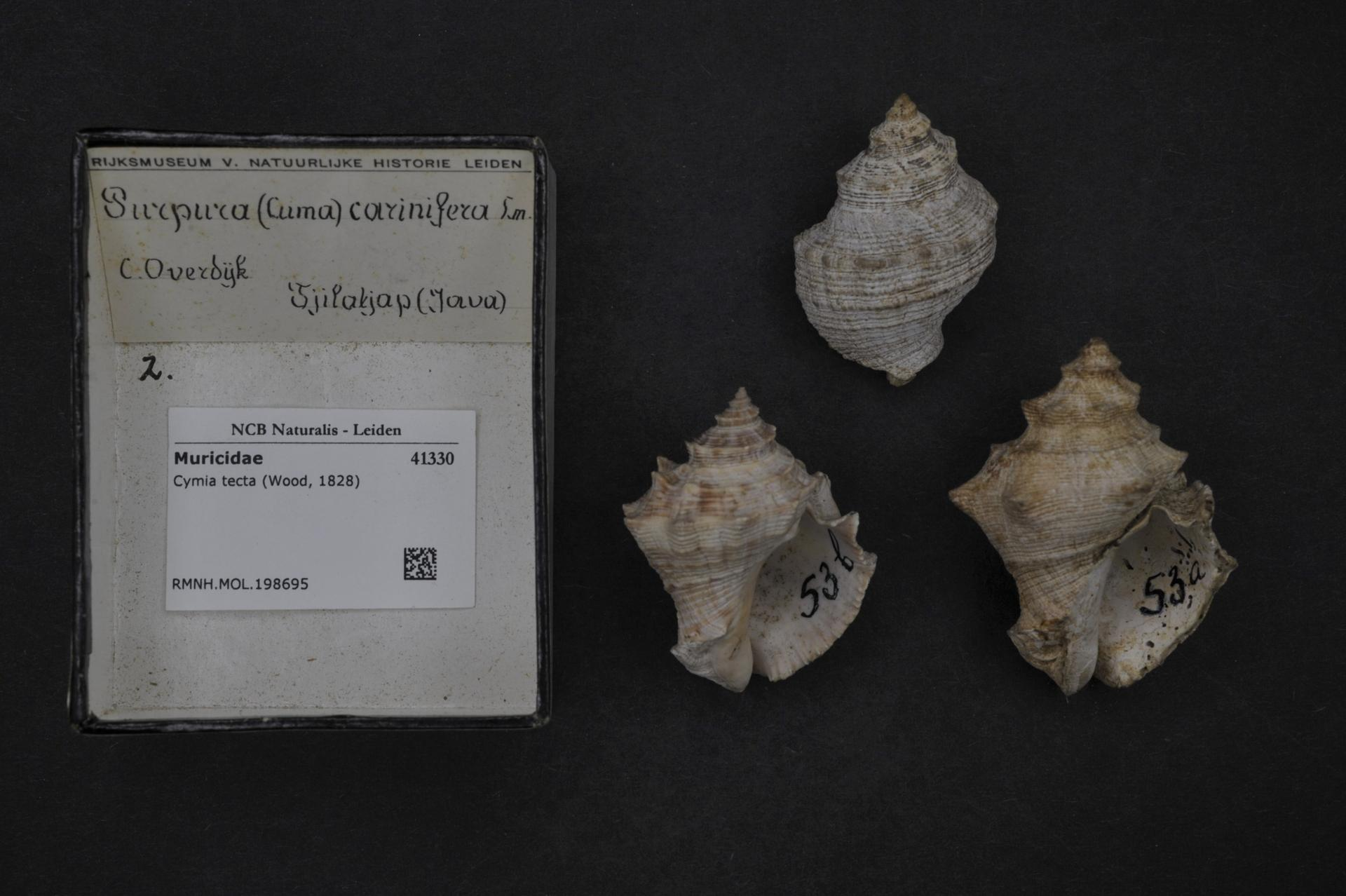
- Cymia tectum shells

Scientific classification
- Kingdom: Animalia
- Phylum: Mollusca
- Class: Gastropoda
- Subclass: Caenogastropoda
- Order: Neogastropoda
- Family: Muricidae
- Subfamily: Rapaninae
- Genus: Cymia; Mörch, 1860

Synonyms
- Cumopsis Rovereto, 1899

= Cymia =

Genus of gastropods

Cymia is a genus of sea snails, marine gastropod mollusks in the family Muricidae, the murex snails or rock snails.

== Species ==
- Cymia tectum (W. Wood, 1828)
