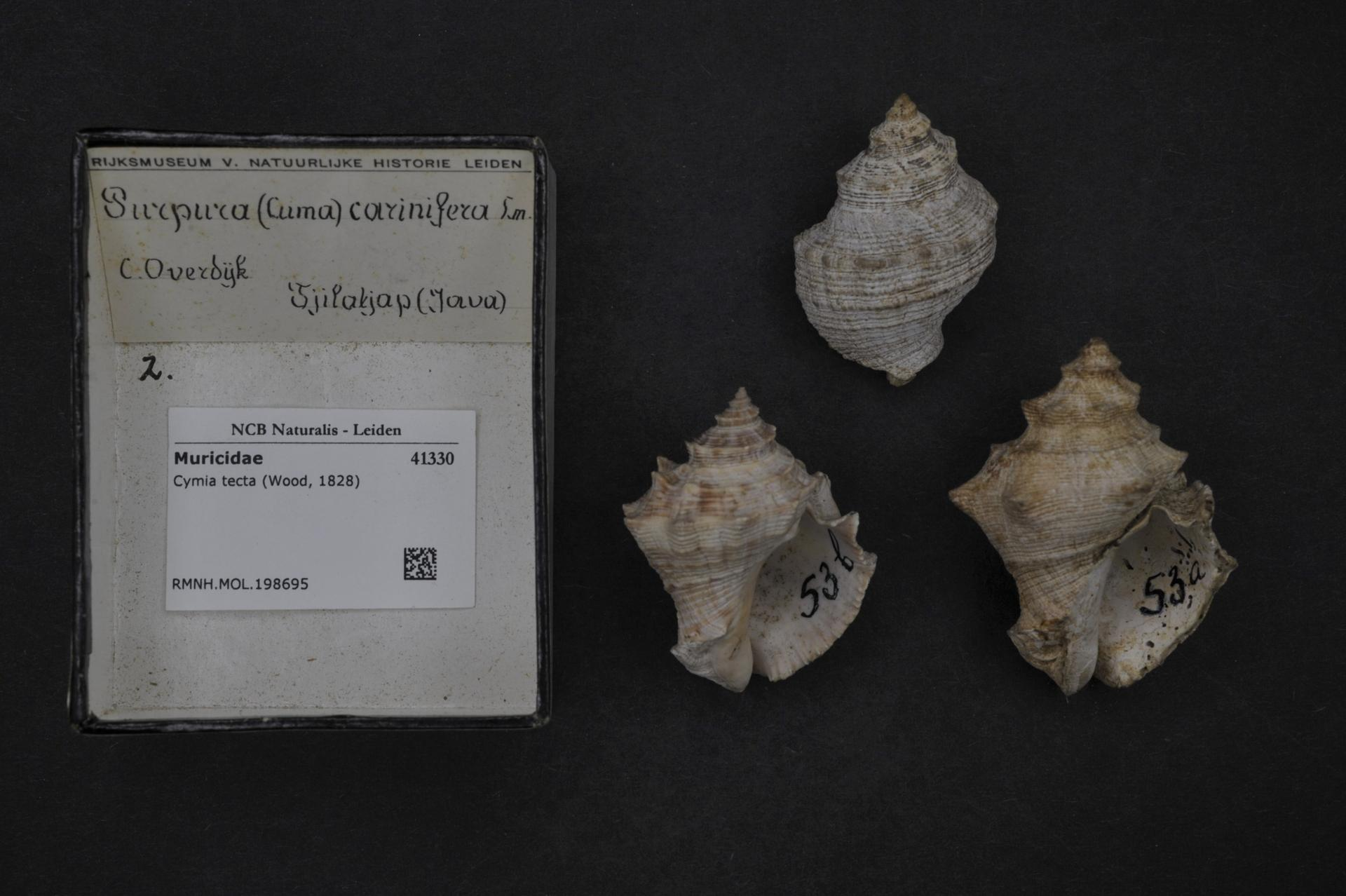
- Cymia tectum shells

Scientific classification
- Kingdom: Animalia
- Phylum: Mollusca
- Class: Gastropoda
- Subclass: Caenogastropoda
- Order: Neogastropoda
- Family: Muricidae
- Genus: Cymia
- Species: C. tectum

Binomial name
- Cymia tectum (Wood, 1828)

Synonyms
- Buccinum tectum Wood, 1828; Cuma sulcata Swainson, 1840; Purpura angulifera Duclos, 1832; Purpura callosa Sowerby, 1834; Cymia tecta (Wood, 1828)

= Cymia tectum =

Species of gastropod

Cymia tectum is a species of sea snail, a marine gastropod mollusk in the family Muricidae, the murex snails or rock snails. The average size of a cymia tectum shell measures between 30 and 75 mm.
