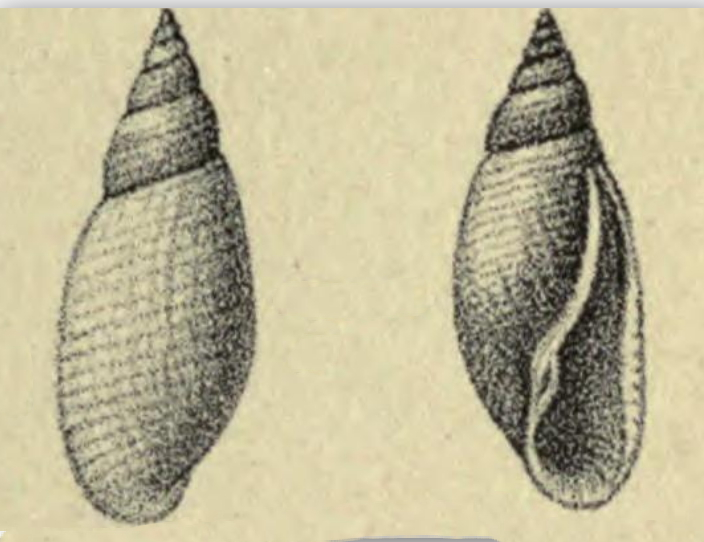
- Drawing of a shell of Acteon senegalensis

Scientific classification
- Kingdom: Animalia
- Phylum: Mollusca
- Class: Gastropoda
- Superfamily: Acteonoidea
- Family: Acteonidae
- Genus: Acteon
- Species: A. senegalensis

Binomial name
- Acteon senegalensis (Petit de la Saussaye, 1851)

Synonyms
- Tornatella senegalensis Petit de la Saussaye, 1851

= Acteon senegalensis =

Species of marine gastropod

Acteon senegalensis is a species of sea snail, a marine gastropod mollusc in the family Acteonidae.

== Description ==
The length of the shell attains 17 mm, its diameter 6 mm.

The thin, elongated shell is cylindrical. It is subpellucid and white. The acute spire is turrited. The shell contains seven whorls, regularly transversely striated. The columella is obliquely uniplicate.

The elongated form, thinness of the shell, and the obliquity of the columellar fold are the distinguishing features of this form.

== Distribution ==
This marine species occurs in the Atlantic Ocean at the mouth of the Gambia river
