= Oppomorus funiculatus =

Scientific classification
- Kingdom: Animalia
- Phylum: Mollusca
- Class: Gastropoda
- Subclass: Caenogastropoda
- Order: Neogastropoda
- Superfamily: Muricoidea
- Family: Muricidae
- Subfamily: Ergalataxinae
- Genus: Oppomorus
- Species: O. funiculatus

Binomial name
- Oppomorus funiculatus (Reeve, 1846)

Synonyms
- Morula (Morula) funiculata (Reeve, 1846); Morula funiculata (Reeve, 1846); Ricinula funiculata Reeve, 1846

Species of gastropod

Oppomorus funiculatus is a species of sea snail, a marine gastropod mollusk, in the family Muricidae, the murex snails or rock snails.

== Distribution ==
It can be found in Hawaii on Oahu Island, Pupukea Beach Park, and near Near Waimea Bay.
