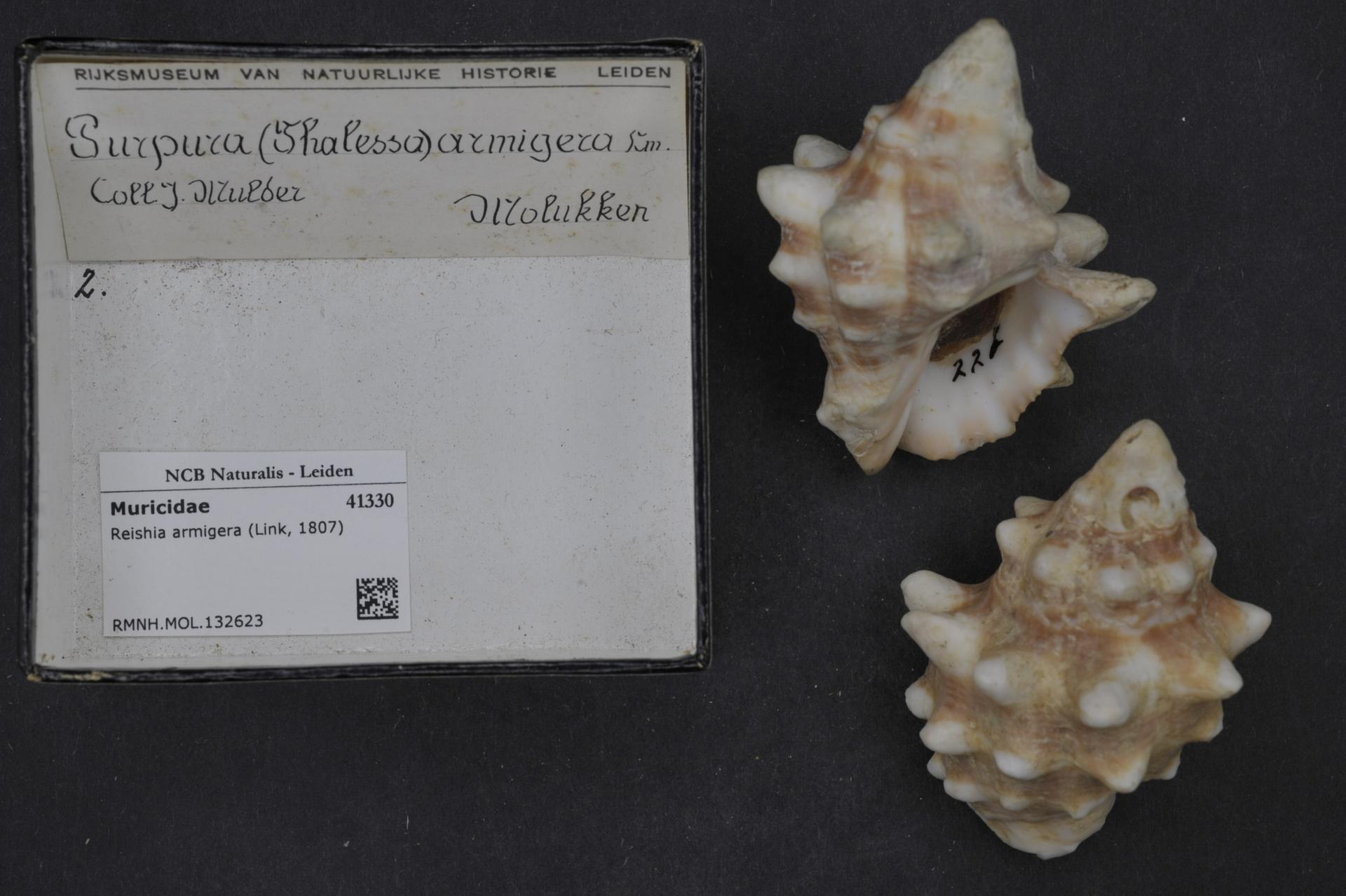
- Museum specimen

Scientific classification
- Kingdom: Animalia
- Phylum: Mollusca
- Class: Gastropoda
- Subclass: Caenogastropoda
- Order: Neogastropoda
- Superfamily: Muricoidea
- Family: Muricidae
- Subfamily: Rapaninae
- Genus: Mancinella
- Species: M. armigera

Binomial name
- Mancinella armigera Link, 1807

Synonyms
- Purpura affinis Reeve, 1846; Purpura armigera (Link, 1807); Purpura armigera Lamarck, 1822; Reishia armigera (Link, 1807); Stramonita armigera (Link, 1807); Thais armigera (Link, 1807); Turbinella armigera (Lamarck, 1822)

= Mancinella armigera =

Species of gastropod

Mancinella armigera is a species of sea snail, a marine gastropod, in the family Muricidae, the murex snails or rock snails. The species name means “bearing arms”.

== Description ==
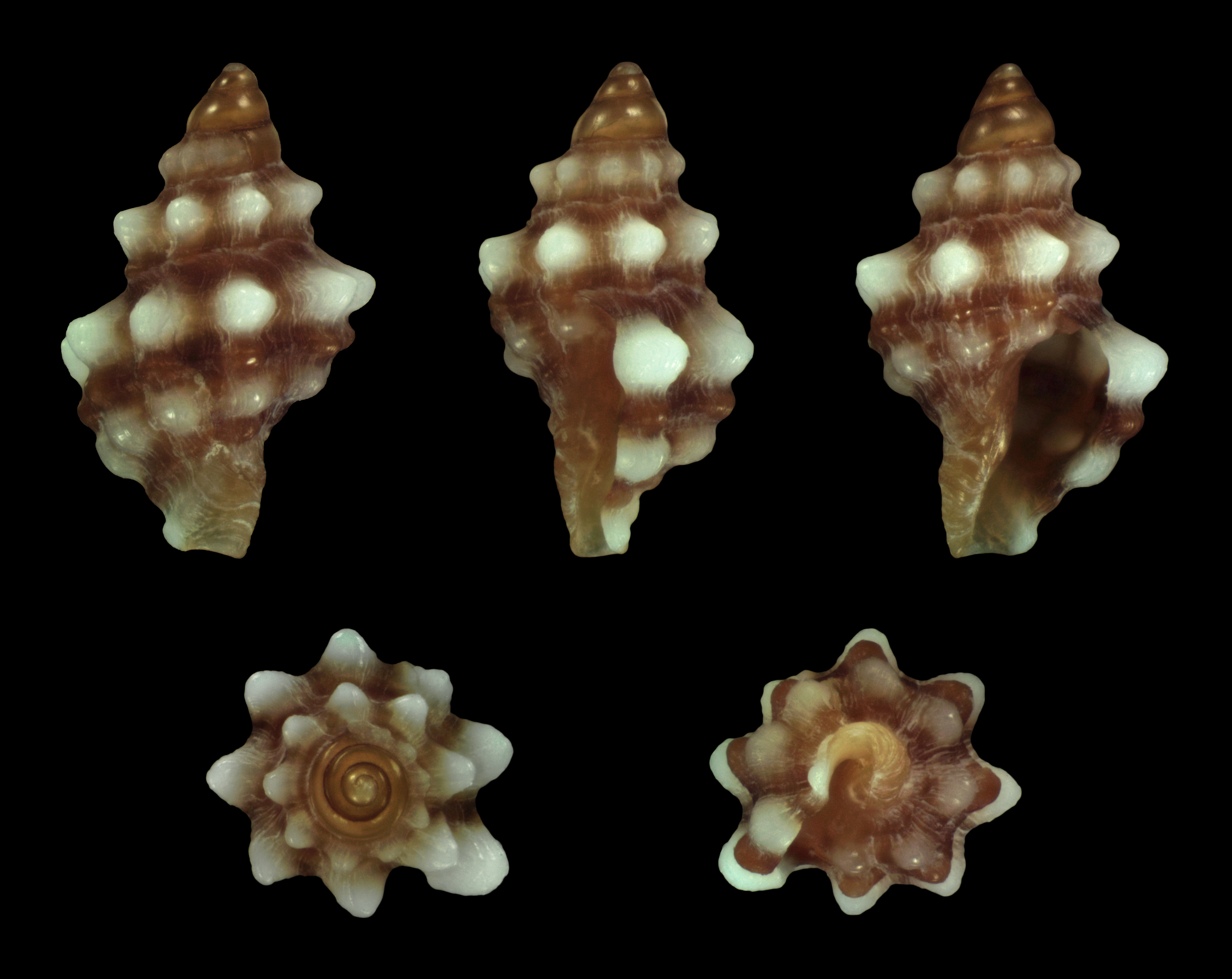
Juvenile

These large drupes have thick, spindle shaped shells covered by blunt tubercles, the aperture is yellowish brown. But they are harmless to humans. The shell is biconic, spire projecting and massive with two rows of projecting noodles on the last whorl, white in color with a yellow aperture. The spire is projecting and acuminate, the suture is shallow. There are eight axial ribs with two rows of prominent tubercles encircling the last whorl and a single spiral of tubercles on the other whorls, as well as a spiral sculpture of fine striae. The aperture is ovate, the outer lips slightly thickened, with six denticles and a columella with a single absolute plait and a moderately developed siphonal fasciole. The shell is often covered with a thick calcareous deposit. The size of an adult shell varies between 50mm and 105.5mm. The shells are typically covered with a pink coralline algae.

== Biology ==
This species is a non broadcast spawner. Life cycle does not include trochophore stage.

== Distribution ==
This species is distributed in the Indian Ocean along Chagos, the Aldabra Atoll and Tanzania; in the Pacific Ocean along Japan.

== Habitat ==
These gastropods occur at the outer edge of fringing reefs and subtitle lava shoulders exposed to heavy wave action. They are common along some exposed rocky coasts at depths of 10–40 ft and they often occur in pairs.

== Human uses ==
Collected for food by coastal populations.
