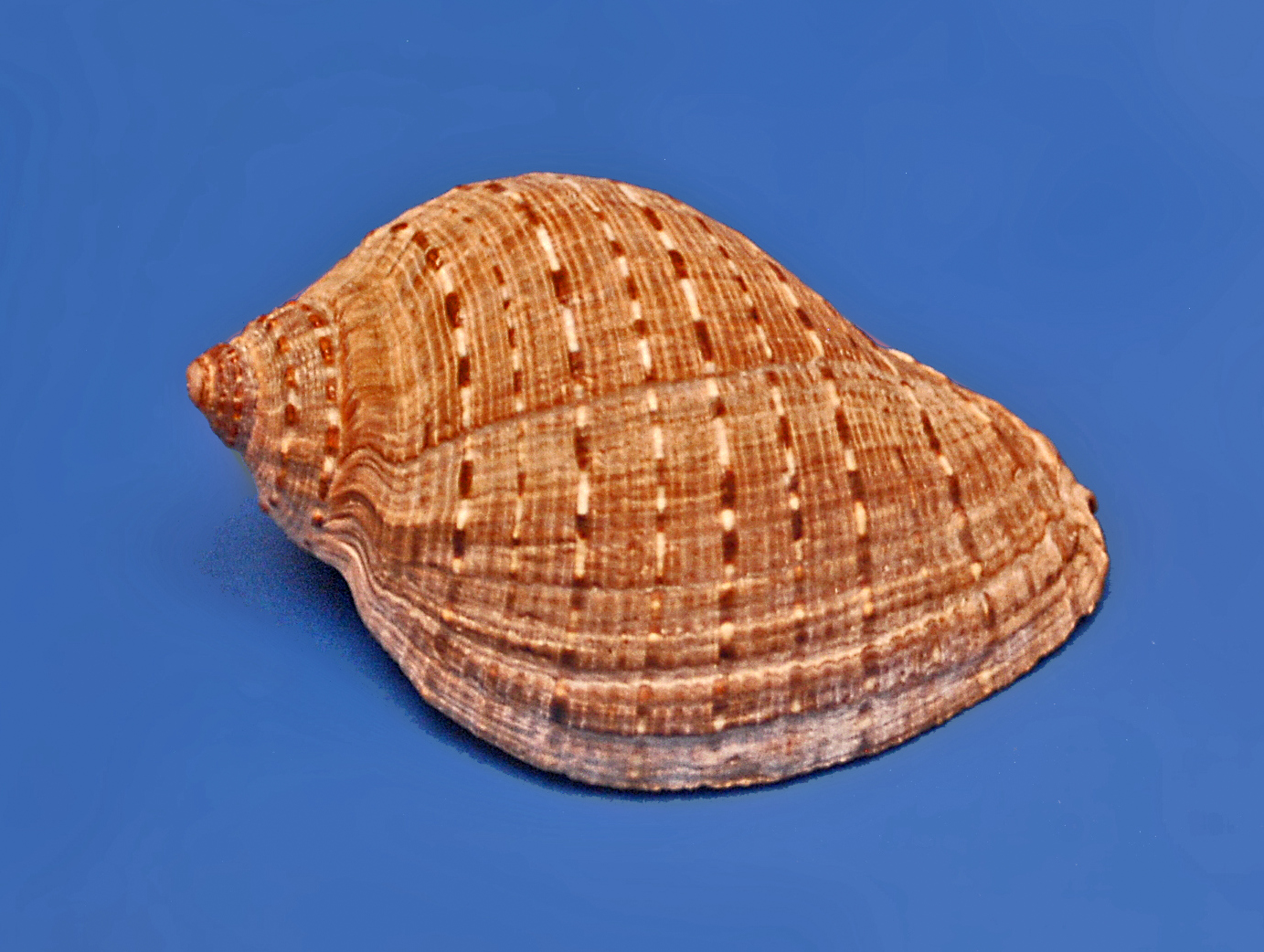
- Shell of Purpura persica on display at the Museo Civico di Storia Naturale di Milano

Scientific classification
- Kingdom: Animalia
- Phylum: Mollusca
- Class: Gastropoda
- Subclass: Caenogastropoda
- Order: Neogastropoda
- Family: Muricidae
- Genus: Purpura
- Species: P. persica

Binomial name
- Purpura persica (Linnaeus, 1758)

Synonyms
- Buccinum persicum Linnaeus, 1758; Purpura aterrima Lesson, 1842; Purpura inerma Reeve, 1846; Purpura panama (Röding, 1798); Purpura rudolphi Lamarck, 1822; Thais panama Röding, 1798; Thais rudolphi Lamarck, 1822

= Purpura persica =

Species of gastropod

Purpura persica, common name : the Persian purpura, is a species of sea snail, a marine gastropod mollusc in the family Muricidae, the murex snails or rock snails.

== Description ==
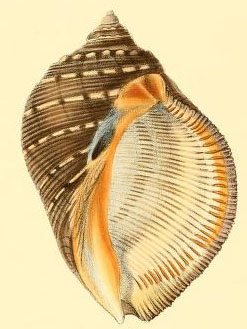
Purpura persica (Lovell Augustus Reeve, 1843. Conchologia iconica)

The shell size of Purpura persica varies between 60 mm and 110 mm. It is a large and thick shell, with large body whorl and a very expanded aperture. The surface shows a chocolate-brown color and it is sculptured with spiralled, beaded cords.

== Distribution ==
This species is distributed in the Red Sea, in the Indian Ocean along Madagascar, Mauritius, Mozambique, Tanzania and the East Coast of South Africa, in the Southwest Pacific and along Japan.
