= Oppomorus purpureocinctus =

Scientific classification
- Kingdom: Animalia
- Phylum: Mollusca
- Class: Gastropoda
- Subclass: Caenogastropoda
- Order: Neogastropoda
- Superfamily: Muricoidea
- Family: Muricidae
- Subfamily: Ergalataxinae
- Genus: Oppomorus
- Species: O. purpureocinctus

Binomial name
- Oppomorus purpureocinctus (Preston, 1909)

Synonyms
- Engina purpureocincta Preston, 1909; Gorgina purpureocincta Preston, 1909 (original combination); Morula (Morula) purpureocincta (Preston, 1909)

Species of gastropod

Oppomorus purpureocinctus is a species of sea snail, a marine gastropod mollusk, in the family Muricidae, the murex snails or rock snails.

== Distribution ==
This marine species occurs off Sri Lanka.
