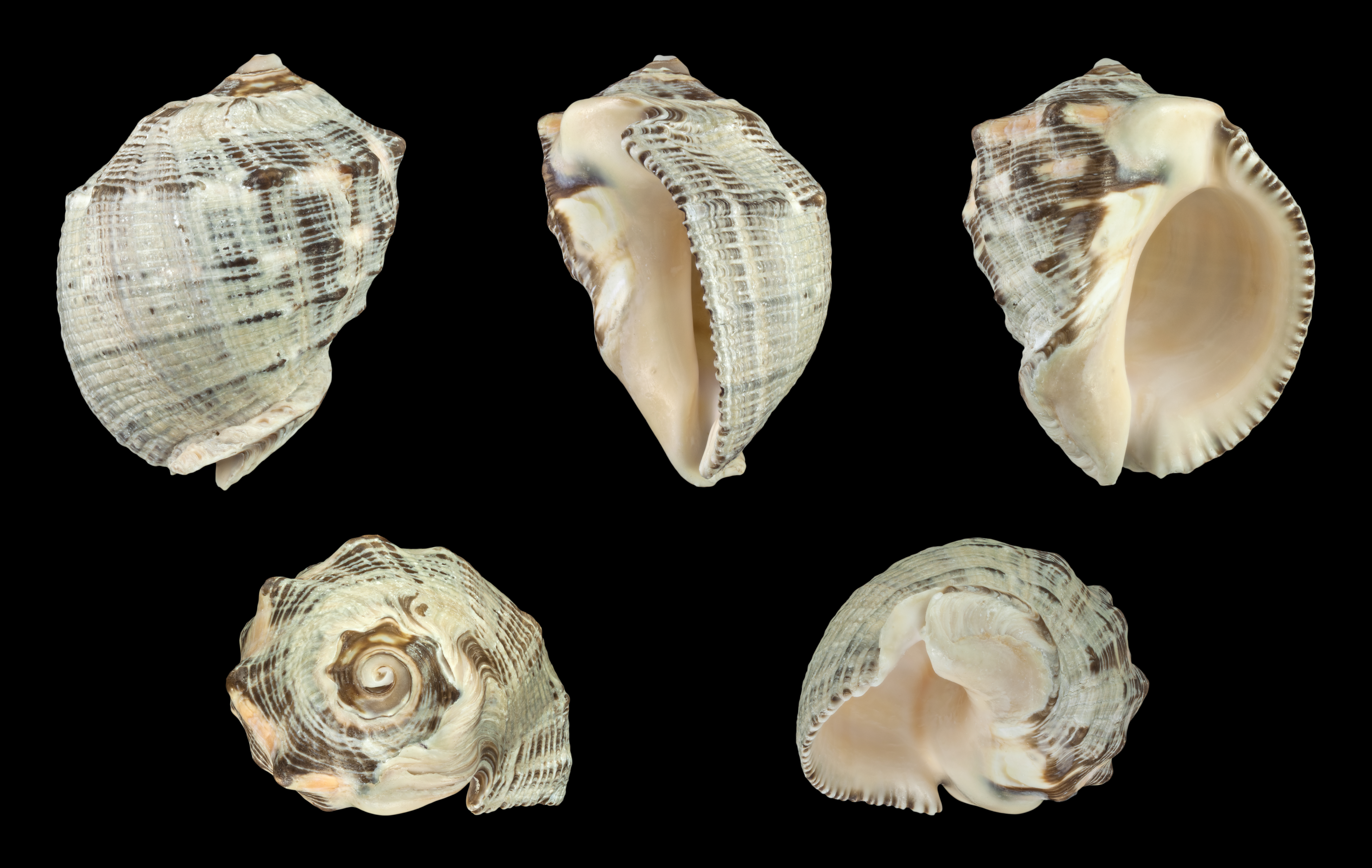

Scientific classification
- Kingdom: Animalia
- Phylum: Mollusca
- Class: Gastropoda
- Subclass: Caenogastropoda
- Order: Neogastropoda
- Family: Muricidae
- Genus: Purpura
- Species: P. bufo

Binomial name
- Purpura bufo Lamarck, 1822

Synonyms
- Purpura bufonides Valenciennes, 1846; Purpura callosa Lamarck, 1822; Purpura timida Schubert & Wagner, 1829

= Purpura bufo =

Species of gastropod

Purpura bufo is a species of sea snail, a marine gastropod mollusc in the family Muricidae, the murex snails or rock snails.

== Description ==
Fully adult shells can attain 60+ mm. in size.

== Distribution ==
Purpura bufo is a tropical species found in the Indian Ocean along the KwaZulu-Natal coast and Madagascar.
