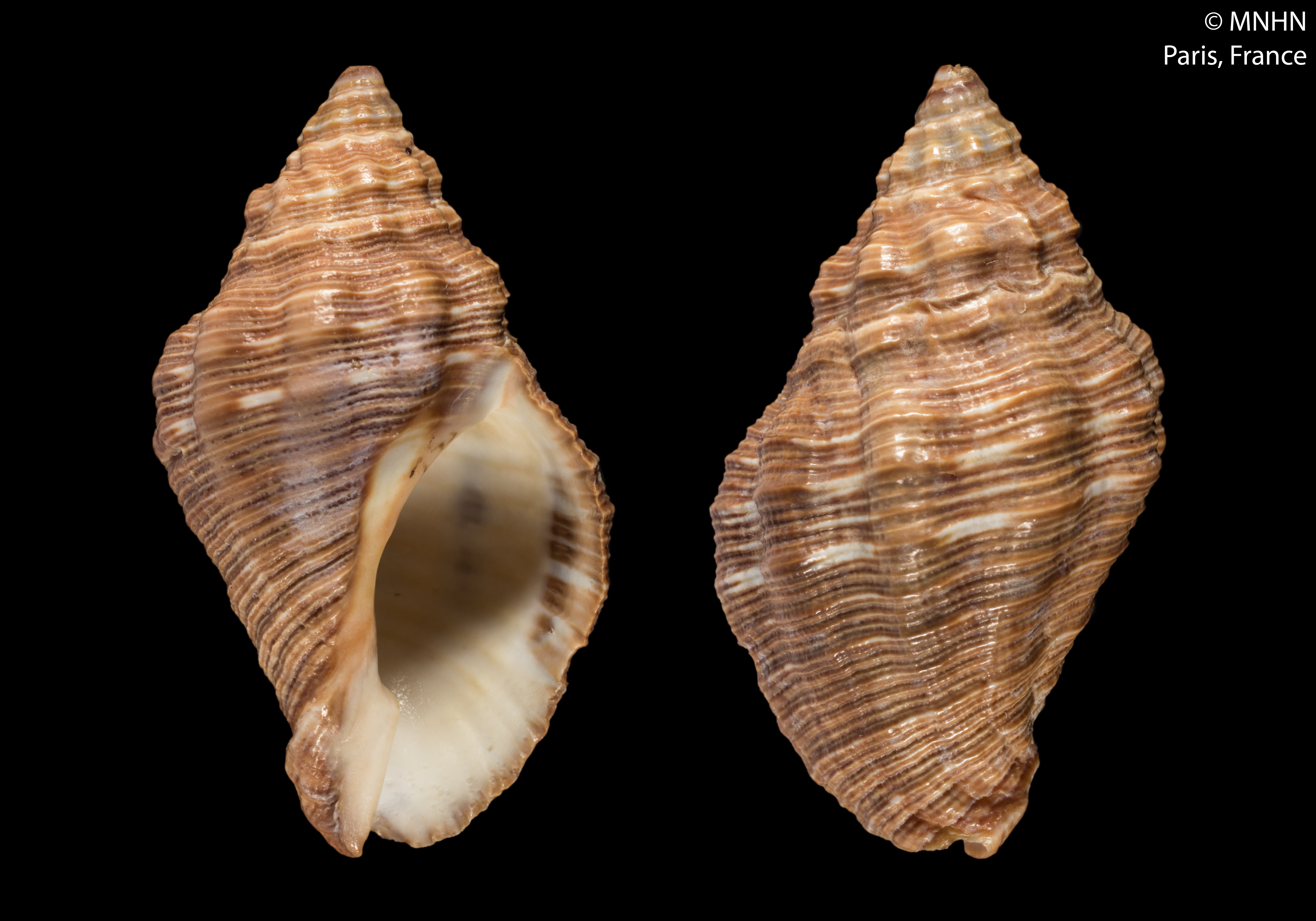
- Shell of Taurasia striata (syntype at MNHN, Paris)

Scientific classification
- Kingdom: Animalia
- Phylum: Mollusca
- Class: Gastropoda
- Subclass: Caenogastropoda
- Order: Neogastropoda
- Superfamily: Muricoidea
- Family: Muricidae
- Subfamily: Rapaninae
- Genus: Taurasia; Bellardi, 1882

Type species
- † Purpura subfusiformis d'Orbigny, 1852

Synonyms
- † Purpurella Bellardi, 1882 (nvalid: junior homonym of Purpurella Robineau-Desvoidy, 1853 [Diptera] and Purpurella Dall, 1871); Simplicotaurasia Sacco, 1890

= Taurasia =

Genus of gastropods

Taurasia is a genus of sea snails, marine gastropod molluscs in the subfamily Rapaninae of the family Muricidae, the murex snails or rock snails.

== Species ==
Species within the genus Taurasia include:

- † Taurasia coronata Bellardi, 1882
- † Taurasia heteroclita (Grateloup, 1845)
- † Taurasia nodosa Bellardi, 1882
- † Taurasia pleurotoma (Grateloup, 1832)
- Taurasia striata (Quoy & Gaimard, 1833 )
- † Taurasia subfusiformis (d'Orbigny, 1852)

Synonyms

- † Taurasia niasensis Beets, 1985: synonym of † Taurasia striata (Blainville, 1832)
- † Taurasia pendopoensis Beets, 1985: synonym of † Preangeria praeundosa (Vredenburg, 1924)
