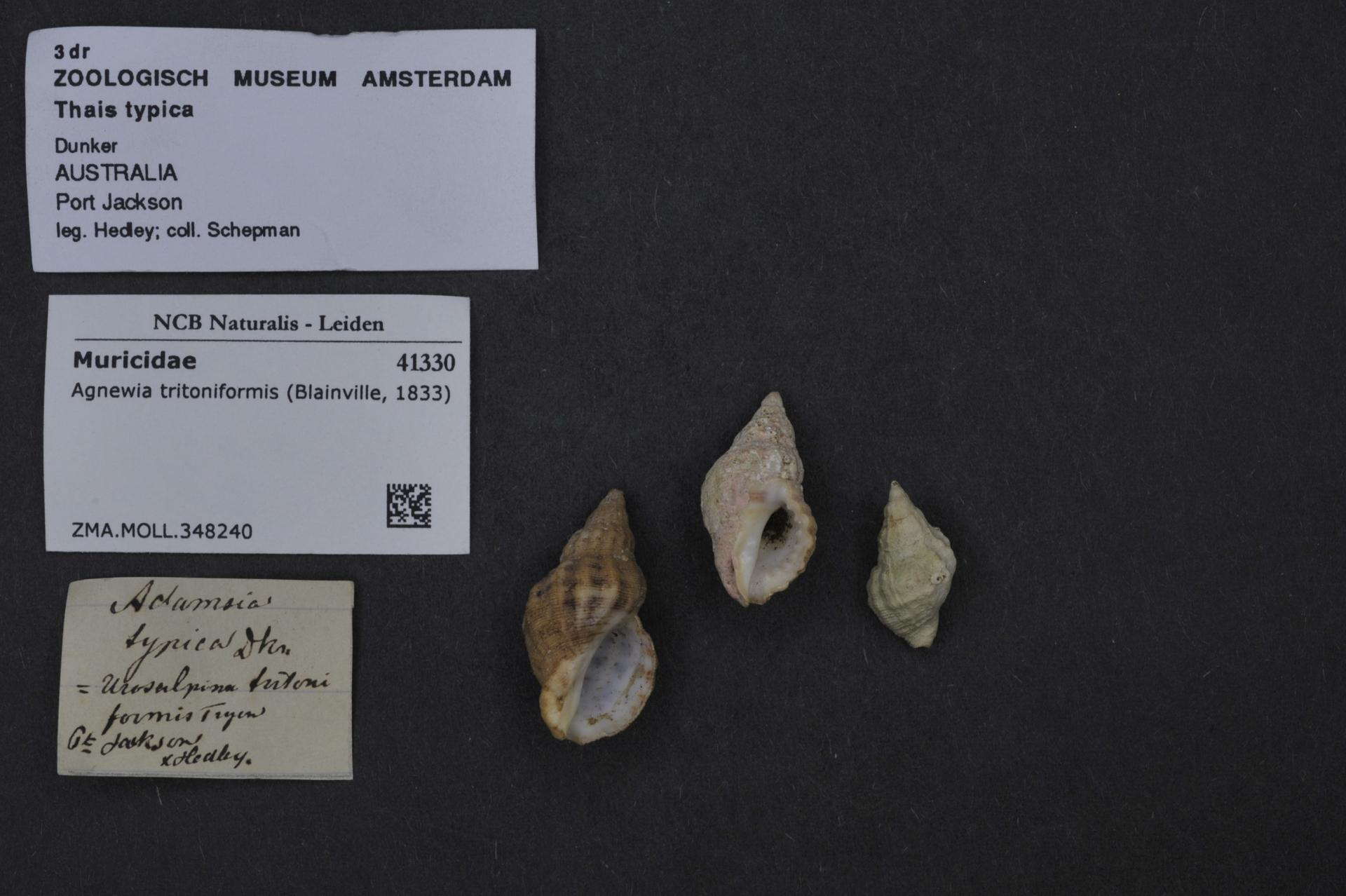
- Agnewia tritoniformis shells

Scientific classification
- Kingdom: Animalia
- Phylum: Mollusca
- Class: Gastropoda
- Subclass: Caenogastropoda
- Order: Neogastropoda
- Family: Muricidae
- Genus: Agnewia
- Species: A. tritoniformis

Binomial name
- Agnewia tritoniformis (Blainville, 1833)

Synonyms
- Adamsia adelaidae Adams & Angas, 1863; Adamsia typica Dunker, 1857; Agnewia nautica Thornley, 1952; Purpura tritoniformis Blainville, 1833; Purpura tritoniformis var. levidensis Kesteven, 1902

= Agnewia tritoniformis =

Species of gastropod

Agnewia tritoniformis is a species of sea snail, a marine gastropod mollusk in the family Muricidae, the murex snails or rock snails.

== Distribution ==
Tasmania, south Australia.
