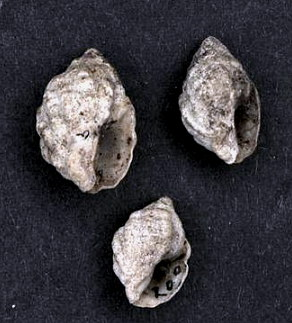
- Three shells of Oppomorus noduliferus (museum specimens at Naturalis Biodiversity Center)

Scientific classification
- Kingdom: Animalia
- Phylum: Mollusca
- Class: Gastropoda
- Subclass: Caenogastropoda
- Order: Neogastropoda
- Family: Muricidae
- Genus: Oppomorus
- Species: O. noduliferus

Binomial name
- Oppomorus noduliferus (Menke, 1829)

Synonyms
- Buccinum gualterianum Kiener, 1840; Morula (Oppomorus) nodulifera (Menke, 1829); Morula chaidea (Duclos, 1832); Morula nodulifera (Menke, 1829); Purpura chaidea Duclos, 1832; Purpura nassoidea Blainville, 1832; Purpura nassoides Quoy & Gaimard, 1833; Purpura nodulifera Menke, 1829 (original combination); Thais chaidea (Duclos, 1832)

= Oppomorus noduliferus =

Nodule castror bean

Species of gastropod

Oppomorus noduliferus, common name the nodule castror bean, is a species of sea snail, a marine gastropod mollusk in the family Muricidae, the murex snails or rock snails.

== Description ==
The length of the shell varies between 15 mm and 25 mm.

The ovate, conical shell is of an ash-gray color. The pointed spire is composed of six or seven whorls, the lowest of which composes alone nearly half of the shell. The body whorl is swollen, and slightly compressed above. The other whorls are somewhat convex, except; the last but one. Their surface is ornamented with eleven or twelve distant, prominent, rounded, longitudinal folds, intersected transversely by fine compact striae. The violet gray aperture is ovate and slightly oblique. The outer lip is furnished interiorly with numerous striae which are continued even to the depth of the cavity. The columella is smooth and whitish, with a pretty prominent fold at the base.

== Distribution ==
This marine species occurs off the Philippines, Oceania, Papua New Guinea, New Zealand, New Caledonia and Australia (New South Wales, Queensland and Western Australia)
