= Sauveur Abel Aubert Petit de la Saussaye =

Sauveur Abel Aubert Petit de la Saussaye (French: [sovœʁ abɛl obɛʁ pəti də la sosɛ]; 1792–1870) was a malacologist from France. His surname is: Petit de la Saussaye.

From 1850 to 1853 he was editor of the Journal de Conchyliologie. He was the author of the following:

- Notice à l'usage des personnes qui s'occupent de la recherche des coquilles, 1838 – Instructions of usage for persons involved in the search for shells.
- Catalogue des mollusques testacés des mers d'Europe, 1869 – Catalog of shelled mollusks found in the seas of Europe.

== Species described ==
Species and genera described by Sauveur Abel Aubert Petit de la Saussaye include (in chronology order):

- Rimellopsis powisii (Petit de la Saussaye, 1840)
- Seychellaxis souleyetianus (Petit de la Saussaye, 1841)
- Thais capensis Petit de la Saussaye, 1852
- Triton loroisii Petit de la Saussaye, 1852 is a synonym for Turritriton labiosus (Wood, 1828)
- Recluzia Petit de la Saussaye, 1853
- Zophos baudoni (Petit de la Saussaye, 1853)
- Fusinus couei (Petit de la Saussaye, 1853)
- Xenophora caribaea Petit de la Saussaye, 1857
- Acteon senegalensis (Petit de la Saussaye, 1851)
