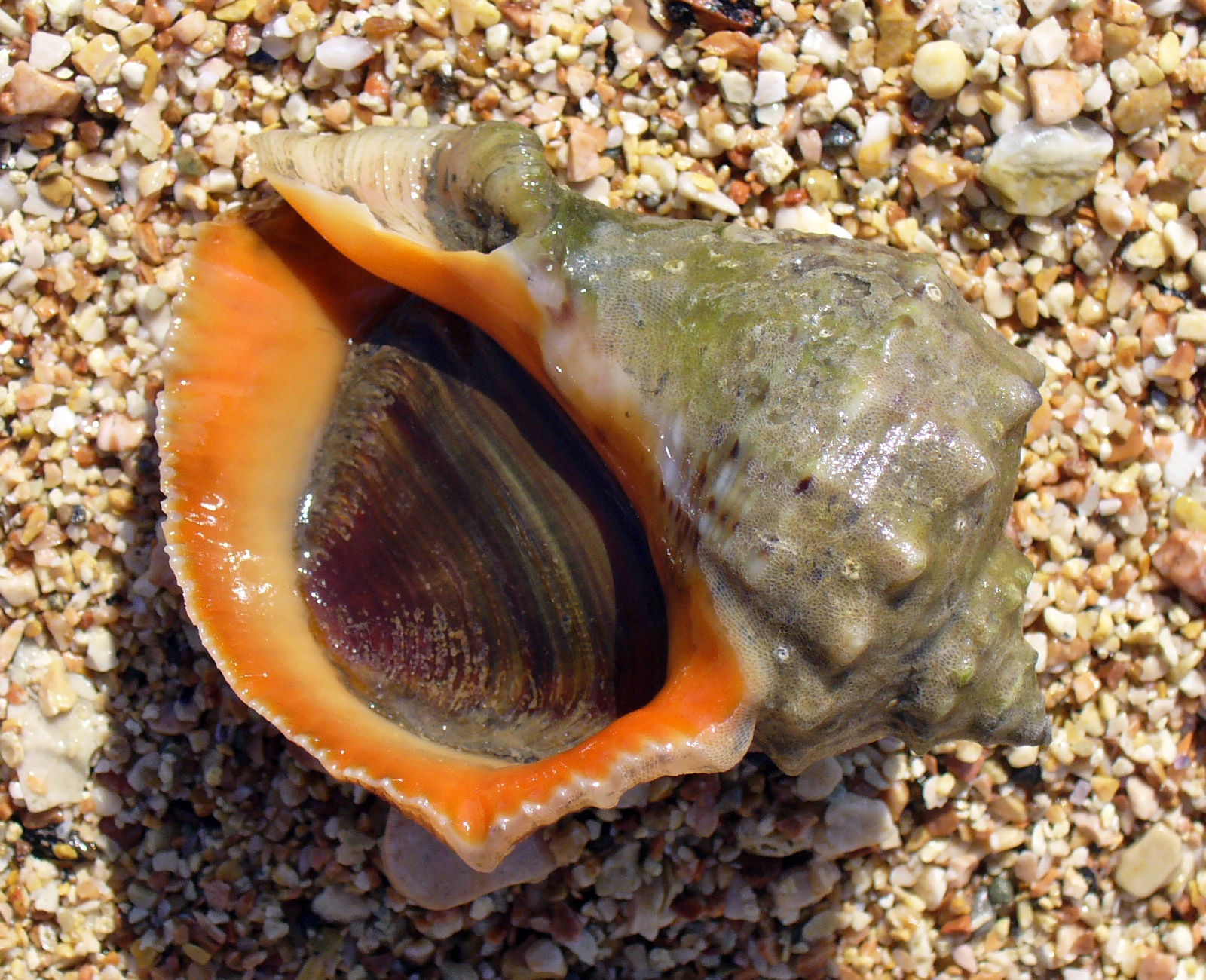
- A live Rapana venosa showing the operculum.

Scientific classification
- Kingdom: Animalia
- Phylum: Mollusca
- Class: Gastropoda
- Subclass: Caenogastropoda
- Order: Neogastropoda
- Superfamily: Muricoidea
- Family: Muricidae
- Subfamily: Rapaninae; Gray, 1853

Genera
- See text

Synonyms
- Concholepadidae Perrier, 1897; Drupinae Wenz, 1938; Purpurellinae Bellardi, 1882 †; Purpuridae Children, 1823 (placed on the Official List by ICZN Opinion 886 with the requirement that it shall not be given precedence over Thaididae); Thaididae Jousseaume, 1888

= Rapaninae =

Subfamily of gastropods

Rapaninae is a subfamily of predatory sea snails, marine gastropod mollusks in the family Muricidae.

This subfamily was known as Thaidinae until 1993.

== Shell description ==
The shell is usually more or less pyriforra, and often produced anteriorly. The spire is short. The inner lip is convex and smooth. The shells of species in this subfamily typically do not have a varix, but strong axial sculpture is often present.

The operculum is ovate, blunt. The nucleus is elongate, forming the outer or hinder edge.

== Genera ==
Genera within the subfamily Rapaninae include:

- Acanthais Vermeij & Kool, 1994
- Agnewia Woods, 1878
- † Califrapana C. L. Powell & Houart, 2021
- † Chesathais Petuch, 1988
- Concholepas Lamarck, 1801
- Cymia Mörch, 1860
- Dicathais Iredale, 1936
- Drupa Röding, 1798
- Drupina Dall, 1923
- † Ecphora Conrad, 1843
- Indothais Claremont, Vermeij, Williams & Reid, 2013
- Mancinella Link, 1807
- Menathais Iredale, 1937
- Nassa Röding, 1798
- Neorapana Cooke, 1918
- Neothais Iredale, 1912
- Phycothais Tan, 2003
- Pinaxia Adams & Adams, 1853
- Plicopurpura Cossmann, 1903
- Purpura Bruguière, 1789
- Rapana Schumacher, 1817
- Reishia Kuroda & Habe, 1971
- Semiricinula Martens, 1903
- Stramonita Schumacher, 1817
- Taurasia Bellardi, 1882
- Thais Röding, 1798
- Thaisella Clench, 1947
- Tribulus Adams & Adams, 1853
- Tylothais Houart, 2017
- Vasula Mörch, 1860
- Vexilla Swainson, 1840

Genera brought into synonymy

- Canrena Link, 1807 : synonym of Drupa Röding, 1798
- Conchopatella Herrmannsen, 1847 : synonym of Concholepas Lamarck, 1801
- Conchulus Rafinesque, 1815 : synonym of Concholepas Lamarck, 1801
- Conothais Kuroda, 1930 : synonym of Pinaxia Adams & Adams, 1853
- Cuma Swainson, 1840 : synonym of Cymia Mörch, 1860
- Cumopsis Rovereto, 1899 : synonym of Cymia Mörch, 1860
- Iopas Adams & Adams, 1853 : synonym of Nassa Röding, 1798
- Menathais Iredale, 1937 : synonym of Thais (Thalessa) H. & Adams, 1853
- Microtoma Swainson, 1840 : synonym of Plicopurpura Cossmann, 1903
- Patellipurpura Dall, 1909 : synonym of Plicopurpura Cossmann, 1903
- Pentadactylus Mörch, 1852 : synonym of Drupa Röding, 1798
- Planithais Bayle in Fischer, 1884 : synonym of Tribulus Adams & Adams, 1853
- Provexillum Hedley, 1918 : synonym of Vexilla Swainson, 1840
- Purpura Röding, 1798 : synonym of Trunculariopsis Cossmann, 1921
- Purpurella Dall, 1872 : synonym of Plicopurpura Cossmann, 1903
- Ricinella Schumacher, 1817: synonym of Drupa Röding, 1798
- Ricinula Lamarck, 1816 : synonym of Drupa Röding, 1798
- Simplicotaurasia Sacco, 1890 : synonym of Taurasia Bellardi, 1882
- Sistrum Montfort, 1810 : synonym of Drupa Röding, 1798
