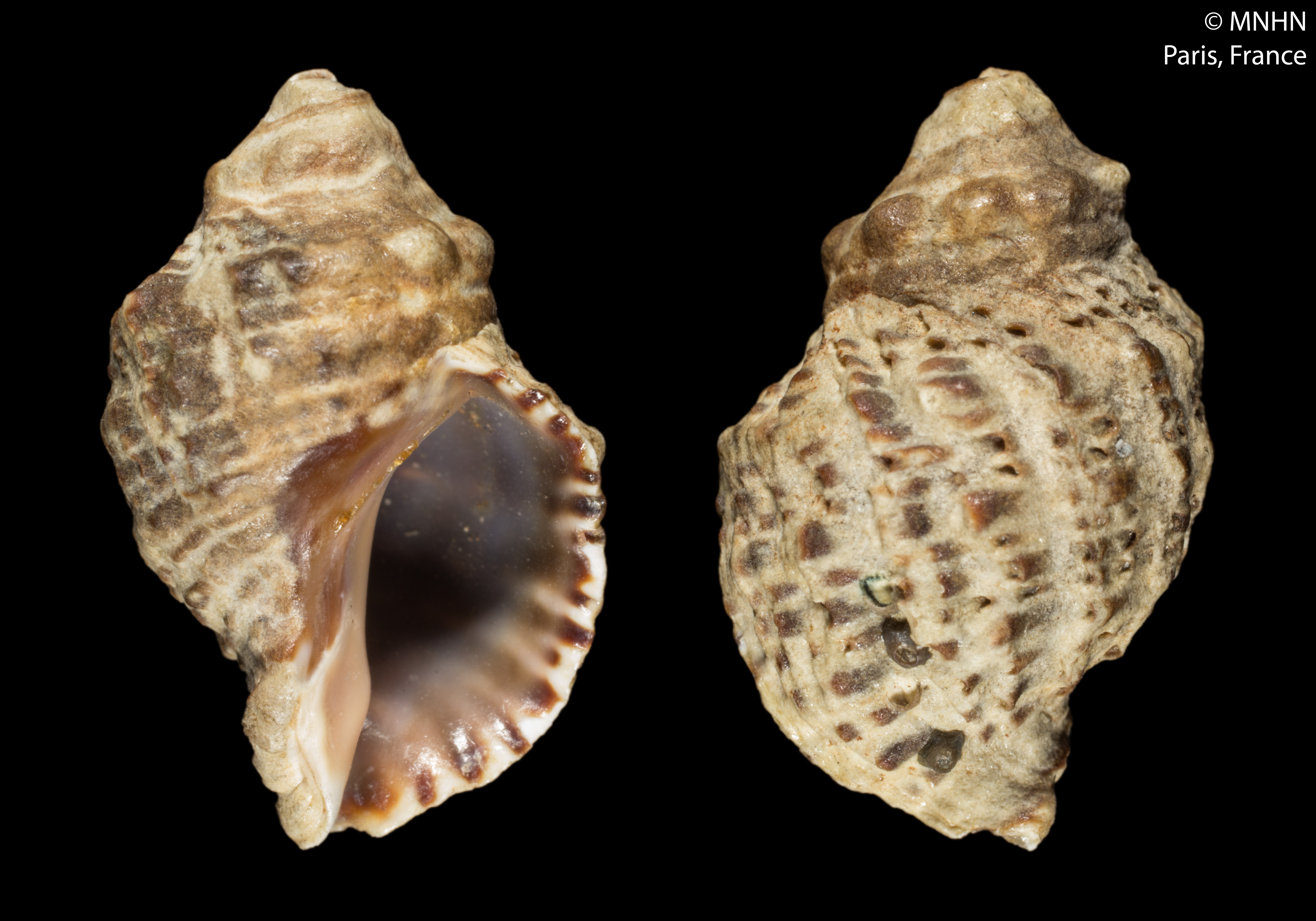
- Shell of Haustrum albomarginatum (specimen at MNHN, Paris)

Scientific classification
- Kingdom: Animalia
- Phylum: Mollusca
- Class: Gastropoda
- Subclass: Caenogastropoda
- Order: Neogastropoda
- Superfamily: Muricoidea
- Family: Muricidae
- Subfamily: Haustrinae
- Genus: Haustrum; Perry, 1811

Type species
- Haustrum zealandicum Perry, 1811

Synonyms
- Lepsia Hutton, 1883; Lepsiella Iredale, 1912; Lepsithais Finlay, 1928

= Haustrum (gastropod) =

Genus of gastropods

Haustrum is a genus of sea snails, marine gastropod mollusks in the subfamily Haustrinae of the family Muricidae, the murex snails or rock snails.

== Species ==
Species within the genus Haustrum include:

- Haustrum albomarginatum (Deshayes, 1839)
- Haustrum haustorium (Gmelin, 1791) - synonym: Haustrum zealandicum Perry, 1811
- † Haustrum intermedium (Powell & Bartrum, 1929)
- Haustrum lacunosum (Bruguière, 1789)
- † Haustrum maximum (Powell & Bartrum, 1929)
- Haustrum scobina (Quoy & Gaimard, 1833)

Synonyms:

- Haustrum baileyanum (Tenison-Woods, 1881): synonym of Bedeva baileyana (Tenison Woods, 1881)
- Haustrum dentex Perry, 1811: synonym of Plicopurpura columellaris (Lamarck, 1816)
- Haustrum flindersi (Adams & Angas, 1863): synonym of Bedeva flindersi (A. Adams & Angas, 1864)
- Haustrum pictum Perry, 1811: synonym of Tribulus planospira (Lamarck, 1822)
- Haustrum striatum Perry, 1811: synonym of Stramonita haemastoma (Linnaeus, 1767)
- Haustrum ventricosum Kaicher, 1980: synonym of Dicathais orbita (Gmelin, 1791)
- Haustrum vinosum (Lamarck, 1822): synonym of Bedeva vinosa (Lamarck, 1822)
