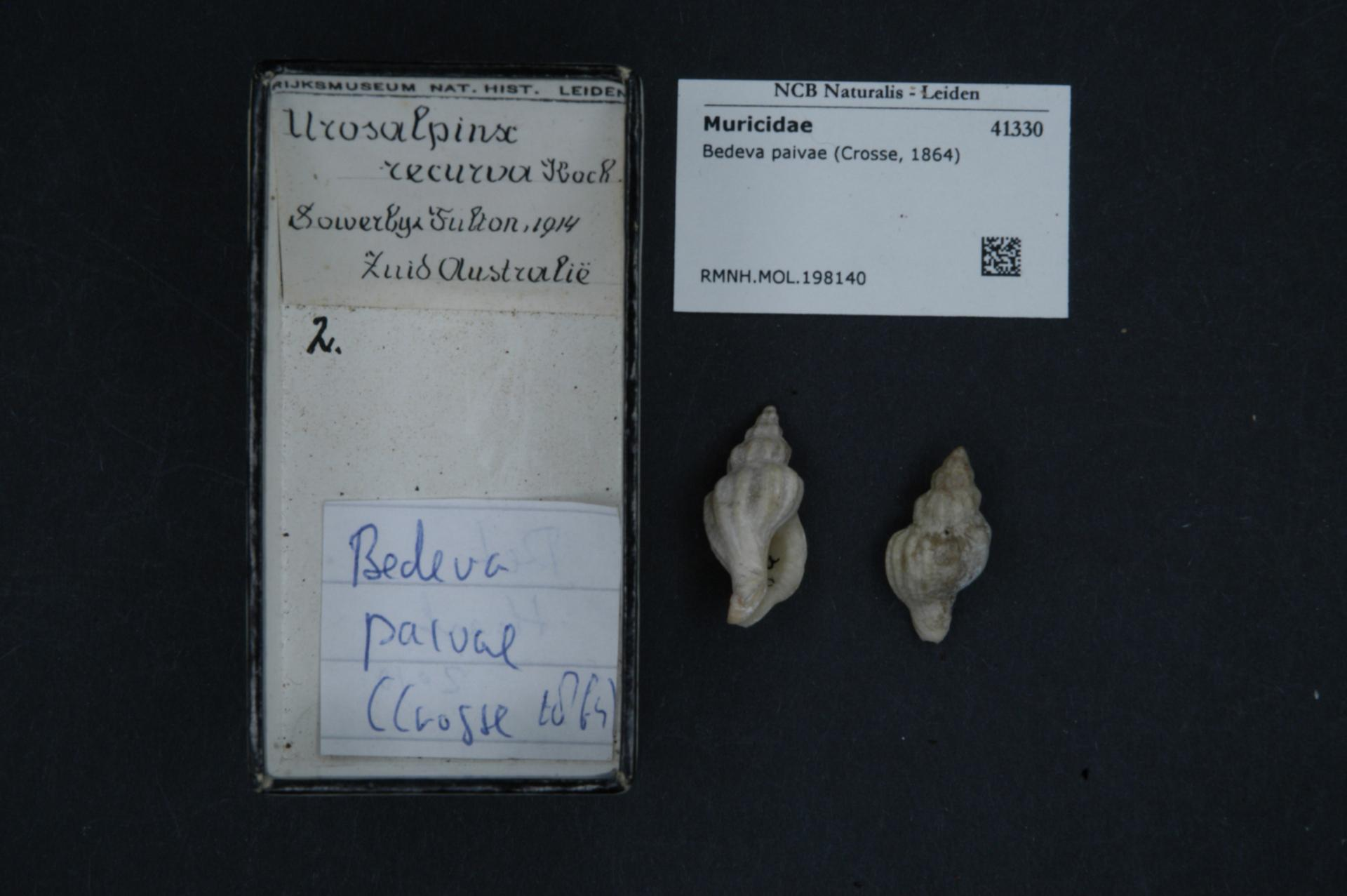
- Bedeva paivae shells

Scientific classification
- Kingdom: Animalia
- Phylum: Mollusca
- Class: Gastropoda
- Subclass: Caenogastropoda
- Order: Neogastropoda
- Superfamily: Muricoidea
- Family: Muricidae
- Subfamily: Haustrinae
- Genus: Bedeva; Iredale, 1924

Type species
- Trophon hanleyi Angas, 1867

= Bedeva =

Genus of gastropods

Bedeva is a genus of sea snails, marine gastropod molluscs in the family Muricidae, the murex snails or rock snails.

== Species ==
Species within the genus Bedeva include:

- Bedeva baileyana (Tenison Woods, 1881)
- † Bedeva bartrumi (Marwick, 1948)
- Bedeva elongata (Tryon, 1880)
- Bedeva flindersi (A. Adams & Angas, 1864)
- Bedeva paivae (Crosse, 1864)
- Bedeva sumatraensis (Thiele, 1925)
- Bedeva vinosa (Lamarck, 1822)

Species brought into synonymy

- Bedeva birileffi (Lischke, 1871): synonym of Bedevina birileffi (Lischke, 1871)
- Bedeva blosvillei (Deshayes, 1832) : synonym of Lataxiena blosvillei (Deshayes, 1832)
- Bedeva pensa Iredale, 1940: synonym of Bedeva paivae (Crosse, 1864)
- Bedeva texturata Smith, 1904: synonym of Phycothais texturata (E.A. Smith, 1904)
- Bedeva vapida Woolacott, 1957: synonym of Lataxiena blosvillei (Deshayes, 1832)
