= Bedeva elongata =

Scientific classification
- Kingdom: Animalia
- Phylum: Mollusca
- Class: Gastropoda
- Subclass: Caenogastropoda
- Order: Neogastropoda
- Superfamily: Muricoidea
- Family: Muricidae
- Subfamily: Haustrinae
- Genus: Bedeva
- Species: B. elongata

Binomial name
- Bedeva elongata (Tryon, 1880)

Species of gastropod

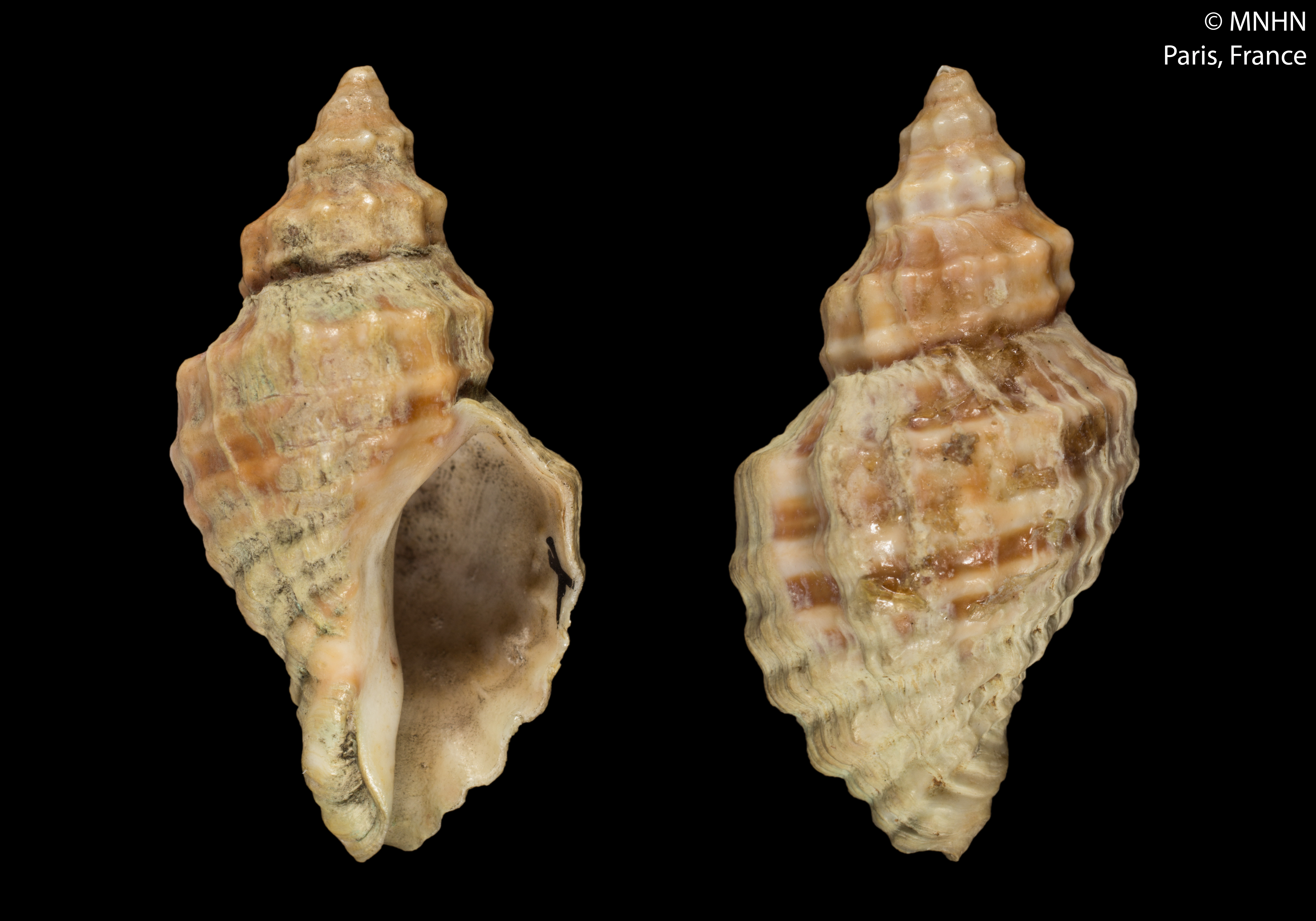

Bedeva elongata is a species of sea snail, a marine gastropod mollusk, in the family Muricidae, the murex snails or rock snails.
