= Haustrum maximum =

Scientific classification
- Kingdom: Animalia
- Phylum: Mollusca
- Class: Gastropoda
- Subclass: Caenogastropoda
- Order: Neogastropoda
- Superfamily: Muricoidea
- Family: Muricidae
- Subfamily: Haustrinae
- Genus: Haustrum
- Species: †H. maximum

Binomial name
- †Haustrum maximum (Powell & Bartrum, 1929)

Synonyms
- † Lepsiella maxima Powell & Bartrum, 1929

Extinct species of gastropod

Haustrum maximum is an extinct species of sea snail, a marine gastropod mollusk, in the family Muricidae, the murex snails or rock snails.

== Distribution ==
This species occurs in New Zealand.
