= Bedeva bartrumi =

Scientific classification
- Kingdom: Animalia
- Phylum: Mollusca
- Class: Gastropoda
- Subclass: Caenogastropoda
- Order: Neogastropoda
- Superfamily: Muricoidea
- Family: Muricidae
- Subfamily: Haustrinae
- Genus: Bedeva
- Species: †B. bartrumi

Binomial name
- †Bedeva bartrumi (Marwick, 1948)

Synonyms
- † Otahua bartrumi Marwick, 1948

Extinct species of gastropod

Bedeva bartrumi is an extinct species of sea snail, a marine gastropod mollusk, in the family Muricidae, the murex snails or rock snails.

== Distribution ==
This species occurs in New Zealand.
