= Haustrum =

Haustrum (plural: Haustra) may refer to:

- Haustrum (gastropod), a genus of sea snails, marine gastropod mollusks in the family Muricidae
- Haustrum (anatomy), small pouches of colon caused by sacculation, which give the colon its segmented appearance
