= Bedeva baileyana =

Scientific classification
- Kingdom: Animalia
- Phylum: Mollusca
- Class: Gastropoda
- Subclass: Caenogastropoda
- Order: Neogastropoda
- Superfamily: Muricoidea
- Family: Muricidae
- Subfamily: Haustrinae
- Genus: Bedeva
- Species: B. baileyana

Binomial name
- Bedeva baileyana (Tenison Woods, 1881)

Synonyms
- Haustrum baileyanum (Tenison Woods, 1881); Lepsiella baileyana (Tenison Woods, 1881); Purpura baileyana Tenison Woods, 1881

Species of gastropod

Bedeva baileyana is a species of sea snail, a marine gastropod mollusk, in the family Muricidae, the murex snails or rock snails.
