= Plicopurpura eudeli =

Scientific classification
- Kingdom: Animalia
- Phylum: Mollusca
- Class: Gastropoda
- Subclass: Caenogastropoda
- Order: Neogastropoda
- Family: Muricidae
- Genus: Plicopurpura
- Species: P. eudeli

Binomial name
- Plicopurpura eudeli (Sowerby III, 1903)

Synonyms
- Purpura eudeli Sowerby III, 1903

Species of gastropod

Plicopurpura eudeli is a species of sea snail, a marine gastropod mollusk in the family Muricidae, the murex snails or rock snails.
