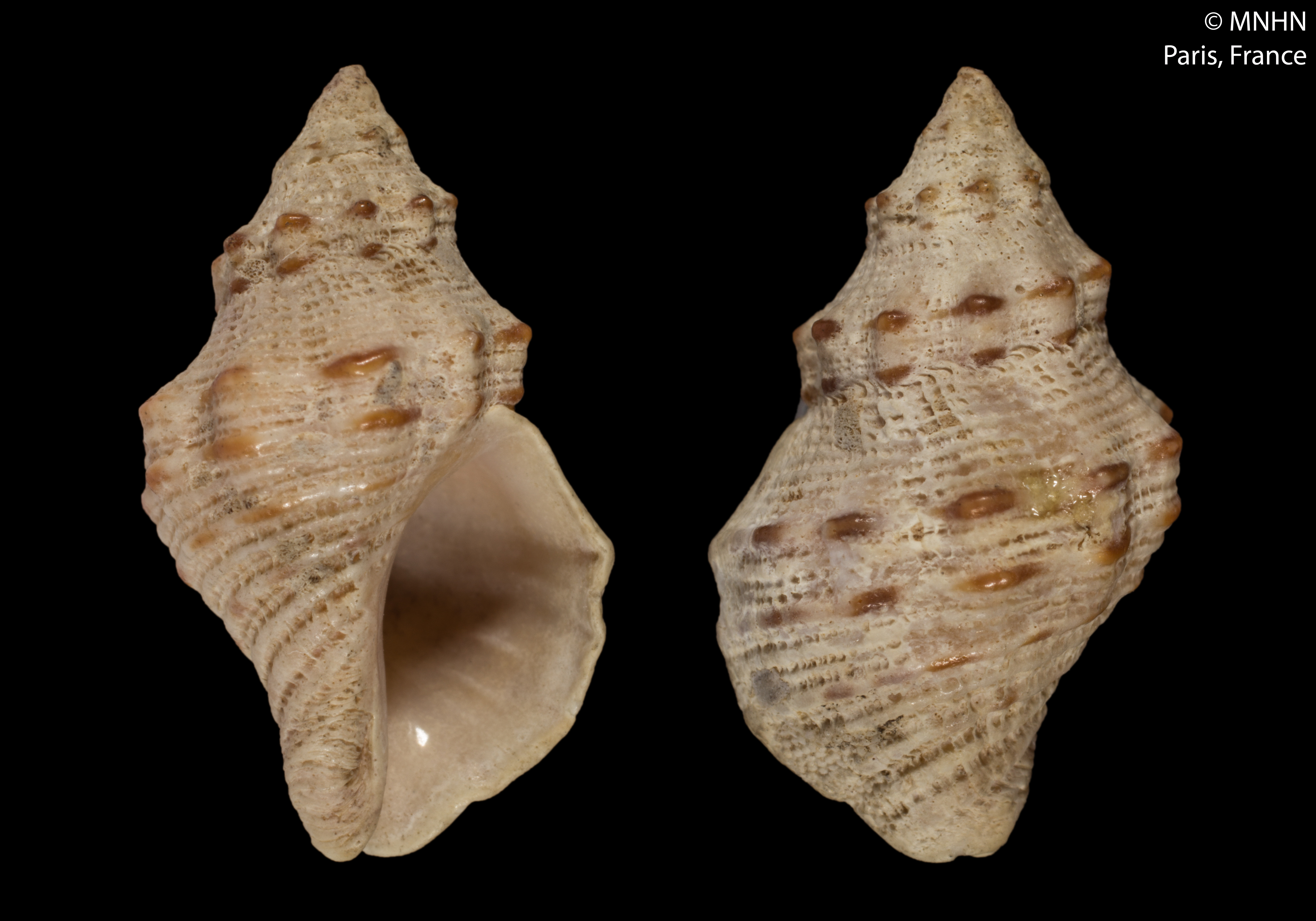
- Shell of Phycothais reticulata (syntype at MNHN, Paris)

Scientific classification
- Kingdom: Animalia
- Phylum: Mollusca
- Class: Gastropoda
- Subclass: Caenogastropoda
- Order: Neogastropoda
- Family: Muricidae
- Genus: Phycothais
- Species: P. reticulata

Binomial name
- Phycothais reticulata (Quoy & Gaimard, 1833)

Synonyms
- Drupa reticulata (Quoy & Gaimard, 1833); Lepsiella reticulata (Blainville, 1832); Purpura humilis Crosse & Fischer, 1865; Purpura reticulata Blainville, 1832 (original combination); Purpura reticulata Quoy & Gaimard, 1833 (homonym and synonym of Purpura reticulata Blainville, 1832)

= Phycothais reticulata =

Species of gastropod

Phycothais reticulata is a species of sea snail, a marine gastropod mollusc in the family Muricidae, the murex snails or rock snails.

== Description ==
The length of the shell attains 16.8 mm.

== Distribution ==
This species occurs in the Red Sea, around Australia and off Tasmania.
