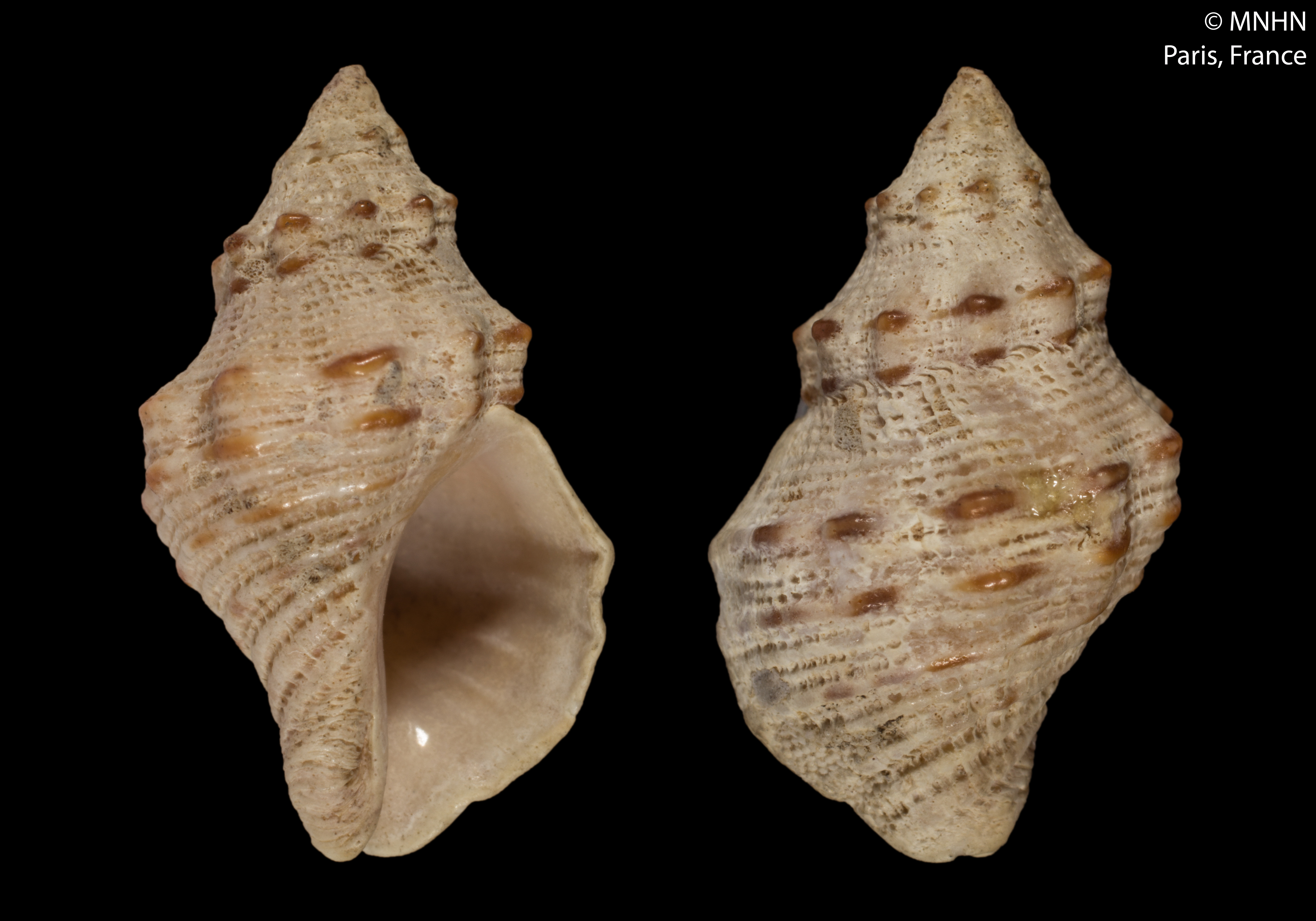
- Phycothais reticulata

Scientific classification
- Kingdom: Animalia
- Phylum: Mollusca
- Class: Gastropoda
- Subclass: Caenogastropoda
- Order: Neogastropoda
- Superfamily: Muricoidea
- Family: Muricidae
- Subfamily: Rapaninae
- Genus: Phycothais; Tan, 2003

Type species
- Purpura reticulata Quoy & Gaimard, 1833

Species
- See text

= Phycothais =

Genus of gastropods

Phycothais is a genus of sea snails, marine gastropod mollusks in the subfamily Rapaninae of the family Muricidae, the murex snails or rock snails.

== Species ==
Species within the genus Phycothais include:

- Phycothais botanica (Hedley, 1918)
- Phycothais reticulata (Quoy & Gaimard, 1833)
- Phycothais texturata (E.A. Smith, 1904)
