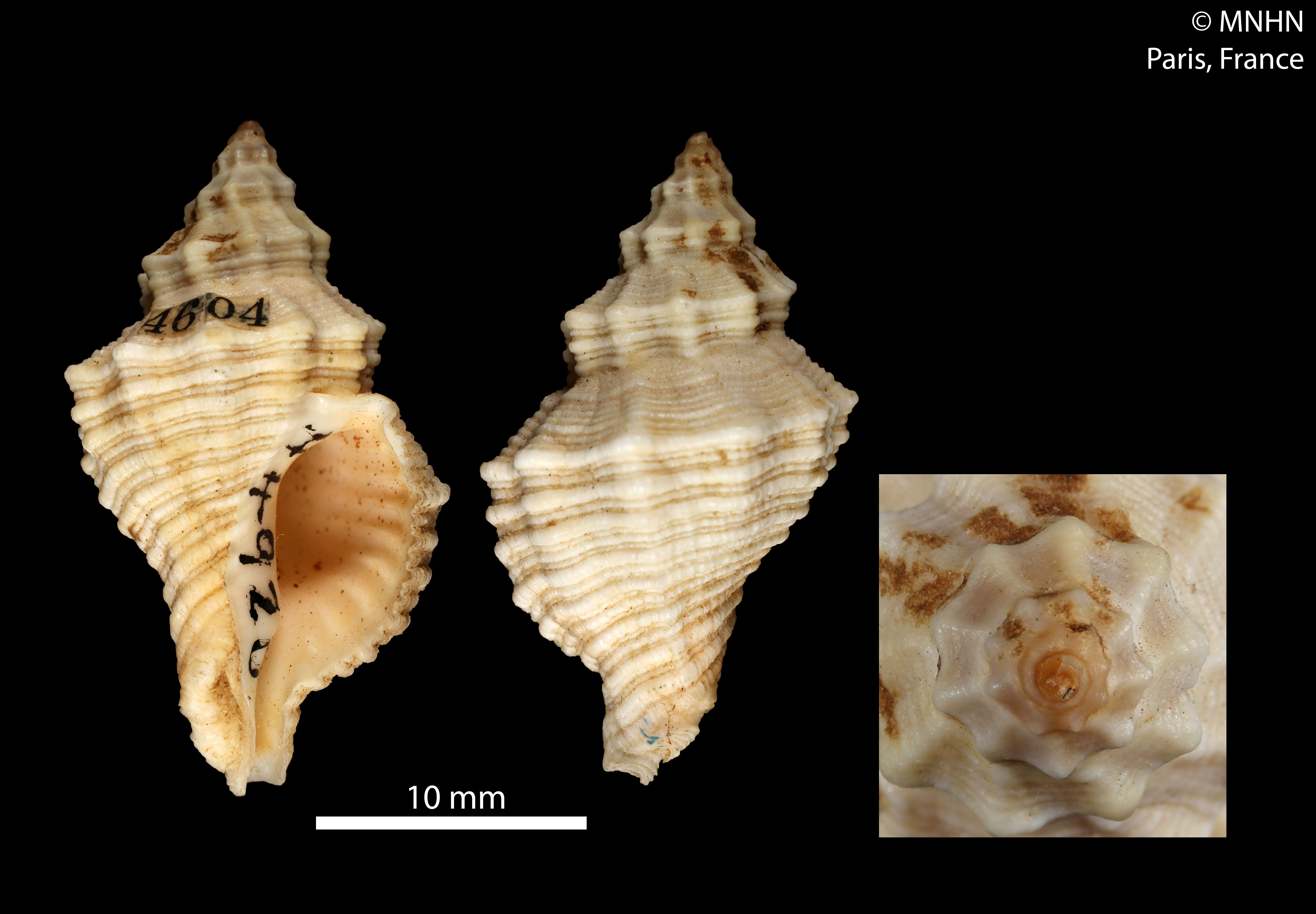
- Shell of Lataxiena habropenos (syntype at MNHN, Paris)

Scientific classification
- Kingdom: Animalia
- Phylum: Mollusca
- Class: Gastropoda
- Subclass: Caenogastropoda
- Order: Neogastropoda
- Family: Muricidae
- Genus: Lataxiena
- Species: L. habropenos

Binomial name
- Lataxiena habropenos Houart, 1995

= Lataxiena habropenos =

Species of gastropod

Lataxiena habropenos is a species of sea snail, a marine gastropod mollusc in the family Muricidae, the murex snails or rock snails.

== Distribution ==
This marine species occurs off Mozambique.
