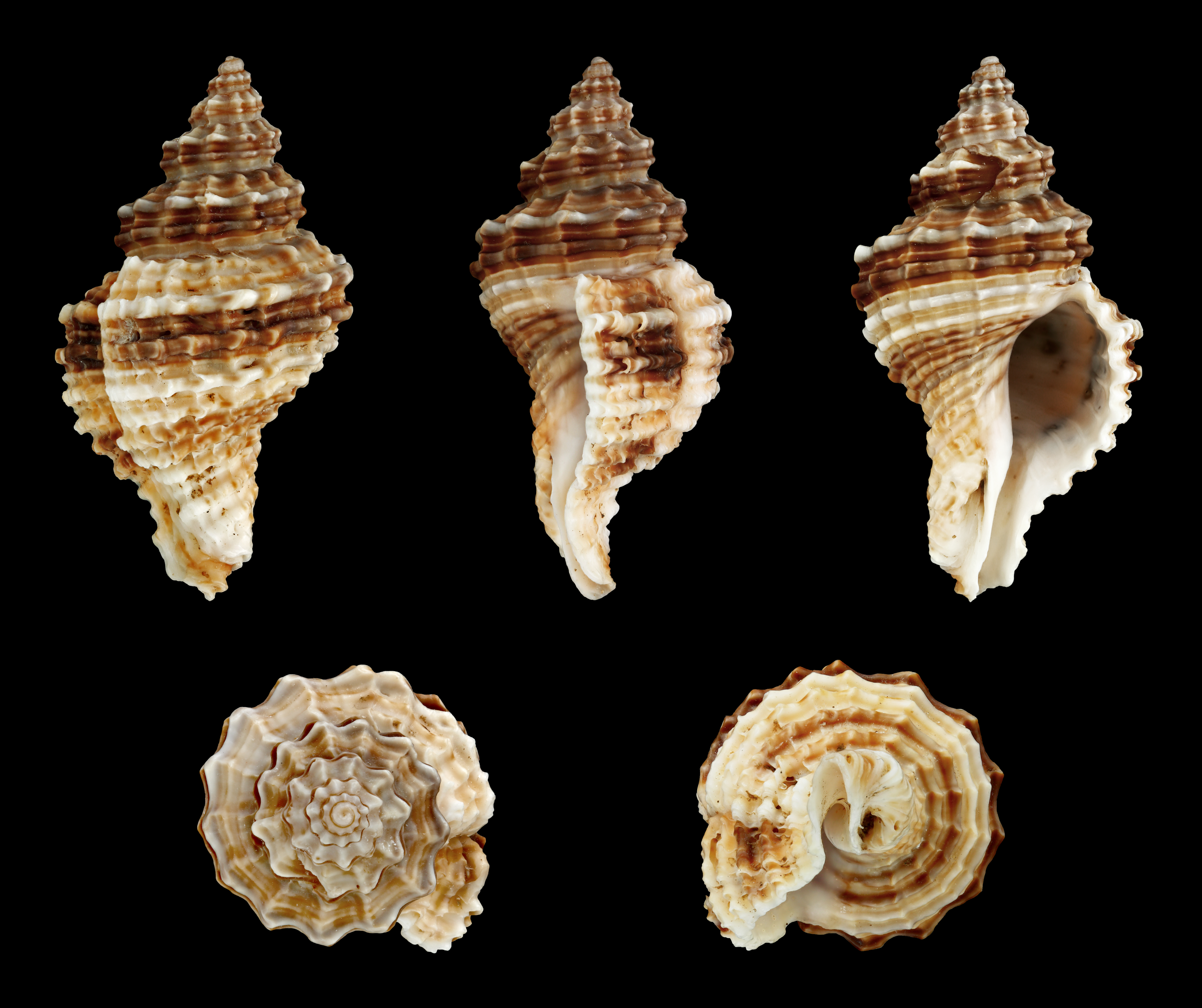

Scientific classification
- Kingdom: Animalia
- Phylum: Mollusca
- Class: Gastropoda
- Subclass: Caenogastropoda
- Order: Neogastropoda
- Family: Muricidae
- Genus: Lataxiena
- Species: L. fimbriata

Binomial name
- Lataxiena fimbriata (Hinds, 1844)

Synonyms
- Coralliophila latiaxidea Sowerby, 1893; Cronia latiaxidea (G. B. Sowerby III, 1894); Lataxiena elegans Jousseaume, 1883; Lataxiena lataxiena Jousseaume, 1883; Murex lamelliferus Dunker, 1871; Murex laminiferus Reeve, 1845; Murex luculentus Reeve, 1845; Trophon fimbriatus Hinds, 1844

= Lataxiena fimbriata =

Species of gastropod

Lataxiena fimbriata is a species of sea snail, a marine gastropod mollusc in the family Muricidae, the murex snails or rock snails.

== Distribution ==
The type species was found in the Makassar Strait, Indonesia.
