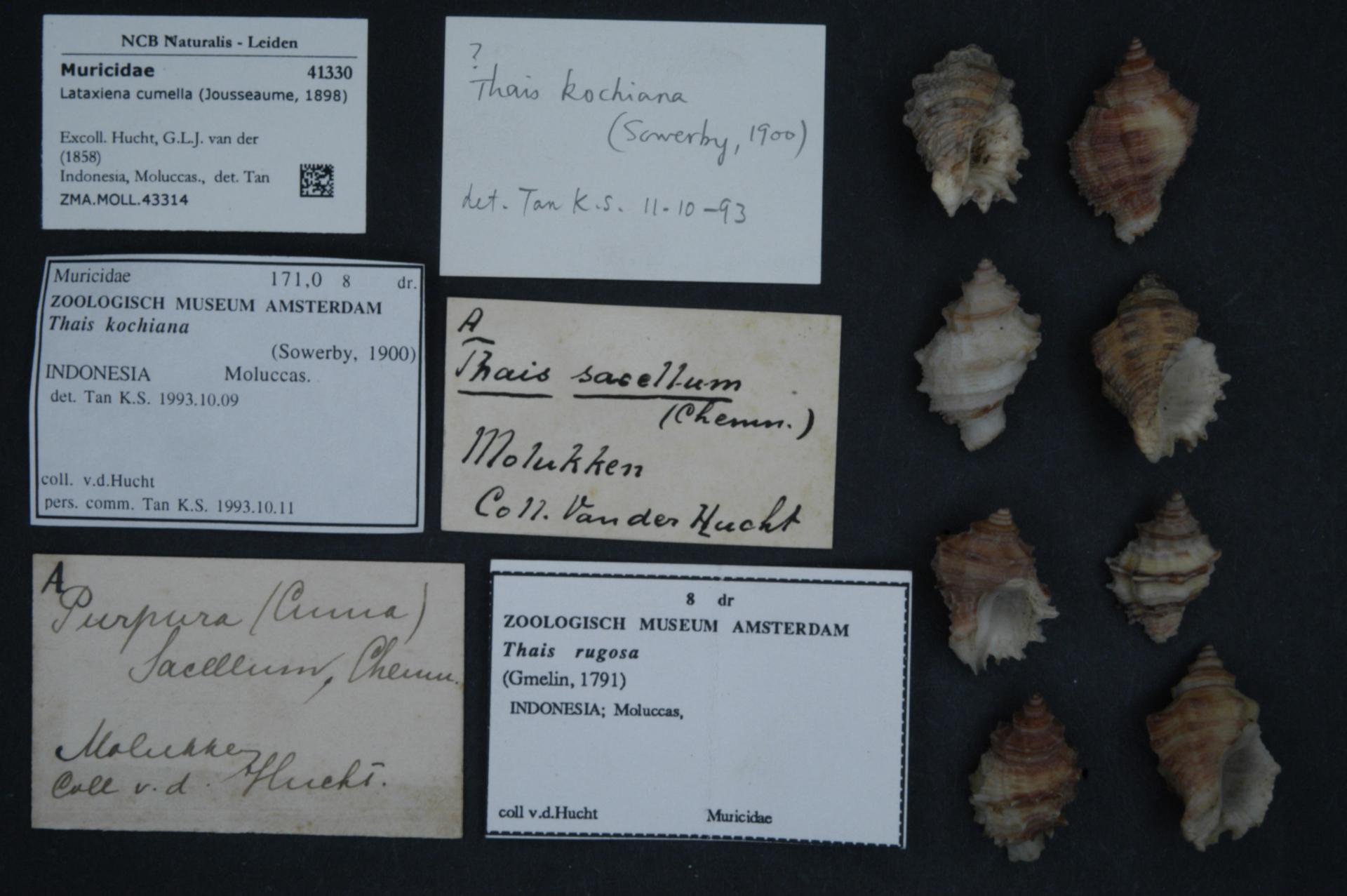
- Lataxiena cumella shells

Scientific classification
- Kingdom: Animalia
- Phylum: Mollusca
- Class: Gastropoda
- Subclass: Caenogastropoda
- Order: Neogastropoda
- Family: Muricidae
- Genus: Lataxiena
- Species: L. cumella

Binomial name
- Lataxiena cumella (Jousseaume, 1898)

Synonyms
- Cumella cumella Jousseaume, 1898; Ocinebra kochiana Sowerby, 1900

= Lataxiena cumella =

Species of gastropod

Lataxiena cumella is a species of sea snail, a marine gastropod mollusk in the family Muricidae, the murex snails or rock snails.

== Distribution ==
This marine species occurs off the Philippines.
