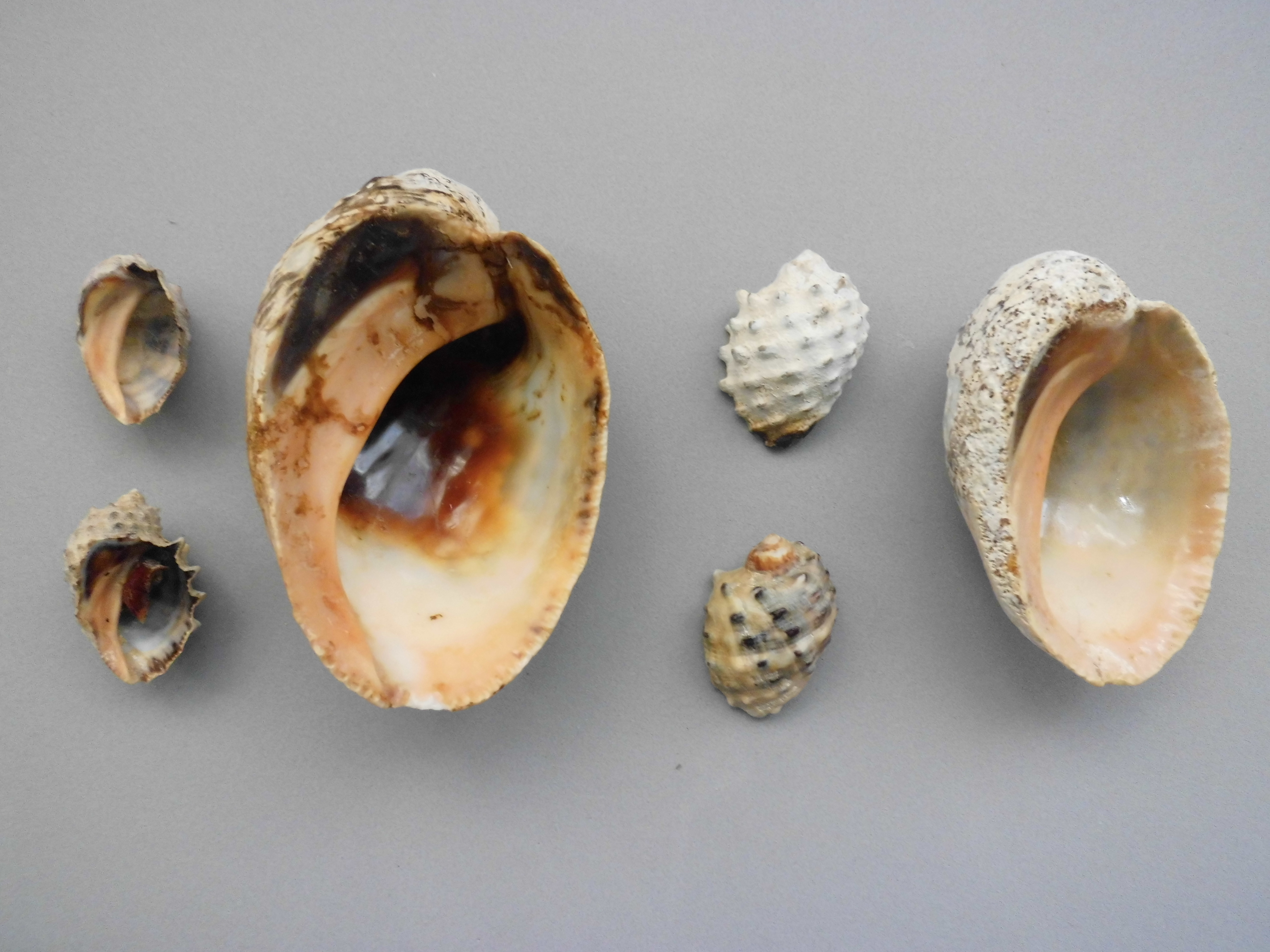
- Plicopurpura patula

Scientific classification
- Kingdom: Animalia
- Phylum: Mollusca
- Class: Gastropoda
- Subclass: Caenogastropoda
- Order: Neogastropoda
- Family: Muricidae
- Subfamily: Rapaninae
- Genus: Plicopurpura; Cossmann, 1903

Synonyms
- Microtoma Swainson, 1840; Patellipurpura Dall, 1909; Purpurella Dall, 1872

= Plicopurpura =

Genus of gastropods

Plicopurpura is a genus of sea snails, marine gastropod mollusks in the family Muricidae, the murex snails or rock snails.

== Species ==
Species within the genus Plicopurpura include:

- Plicopurpura columellaris (Lamarck, 1816)
- Plicopurpura eudeli (Sowerby III, 1903)
- Plicopurpura pansa (Gould, 1853)
- Plicopurpura patula (Linnaeus, 1758)
