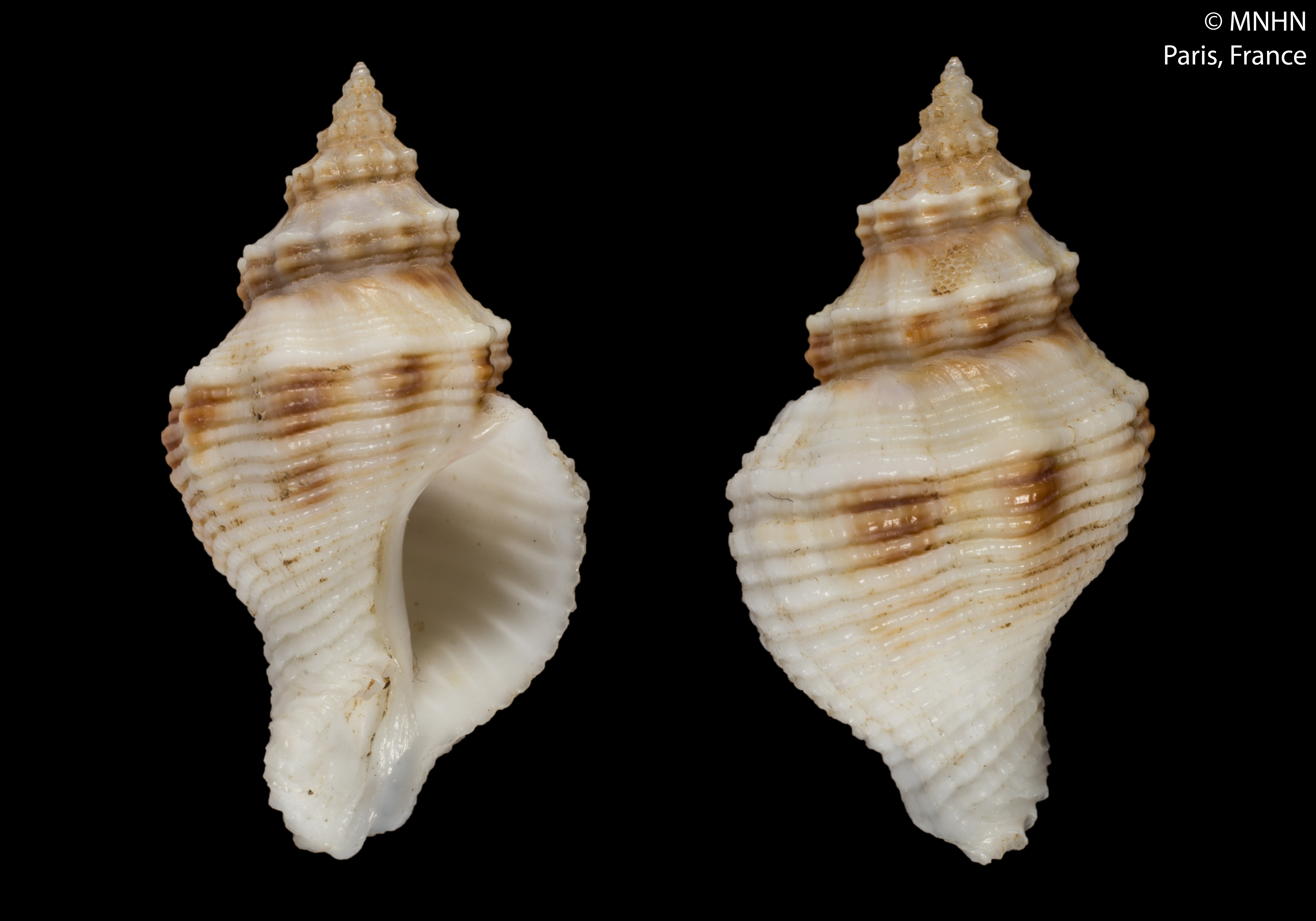
- Shell of Lataxiena solenosteiroides (holotype at MNHN, Paris)

Scientific classification
- Kingdom: Animalia
- Phylum: Mollusca
- Class: Gastropoda
- Subclass: Caenogastropoda
- Order: Neogastropoda
- Family: Muricidae
- Genus: Lataxiena
- Species: L. solenosteiroides

Binomial name
- Lataxiena solenosteiroides Houart, Fraussen & Barbier, 2013

= Lataxiena solenosteiroides =

Species of gastropod

Lataxiena solenosteiroides is a species of sea snail, a marine gastropod mollusc, in the family Muricidae, the murex snails or rock snails.

== Description ==
The length of the shell attains 28.7 mm.

== Distribution ==
This species occurs off Madras, India.
