= Bedeva flindersi =

Scientific classification
- Kingdom: Animalia
- Phylum: Mollusca
- Class: Gastropoda
- Subclass: Caenogastropoda
- Order: Neogastropoda
- Superfamily: Muricoidea
- Family: Muricidae
- Subfamily: Haustrinae
- Genus: Bedeva
- Species: B. flindersi

Binomial name
- Bedeva flindersi (A. Adams & Angas, 1864)

Synonyms
- Haustrum flindersi (A. Adams & Angas, 1864); Lepsiella flindersi (A. Adams & Angas, 1864); Purpura flindersi A. Adams & Angas, 1864; Trophon levis Verco, 1895

Species of gastropod

Bedeva flindersi is a species of sea snail, a marine gastropod mollusk, in the family Muricidae, the murex snails or rock snails.
