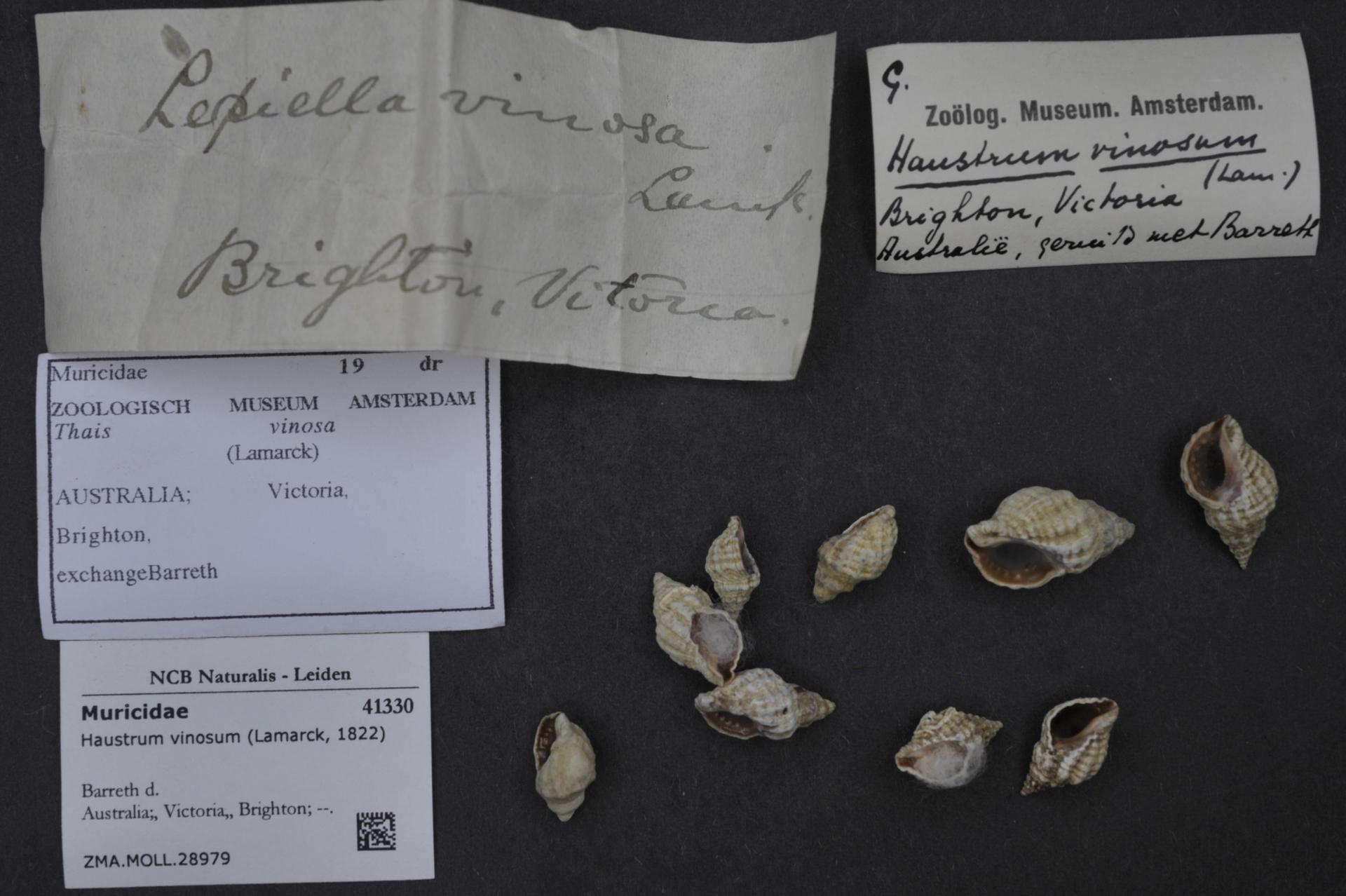

Scientific classification
- Kingdom: Animalia
- Phylum: Mollusca
- Class: Gastropoda
- Subclass: Caenogastropoda
- Order: Neogastropoda
- Superfamily: Muricoidea
- Family: Muricidae
- Subfamily: Haustrinae
- Genus: Bedeva
- Species: B. vinosa

Binomial name
- Bedeva vinosa (Lamarck, 1822)

Synonyms
- Buccinum vinosum Lamarck, 1822; Cominella albolirata Tenison Woods, 1879; Haustrum vinosum (Lamarck, 1822); Kalydon vinosus (Lamarck, 1822); Kalydon vinosus var. aurea Hedley, 1915; Lepsiella vinosa (Lamarck, 1822); Ocenebra jenksii Baker, 1889; Purpura littorinoides Tenison Woods, 1876; Purpura propinqua Tenison Woods, 1877; Ricinula adelaidensis Crosse & P. Fischer, 1865

= Bedeva vinosa =

Species of gastropod

Bedeva vinosa is a species of sea snail, a marine gastropod mollusk, in the family Muricidae, the murex snails or rock snails.
