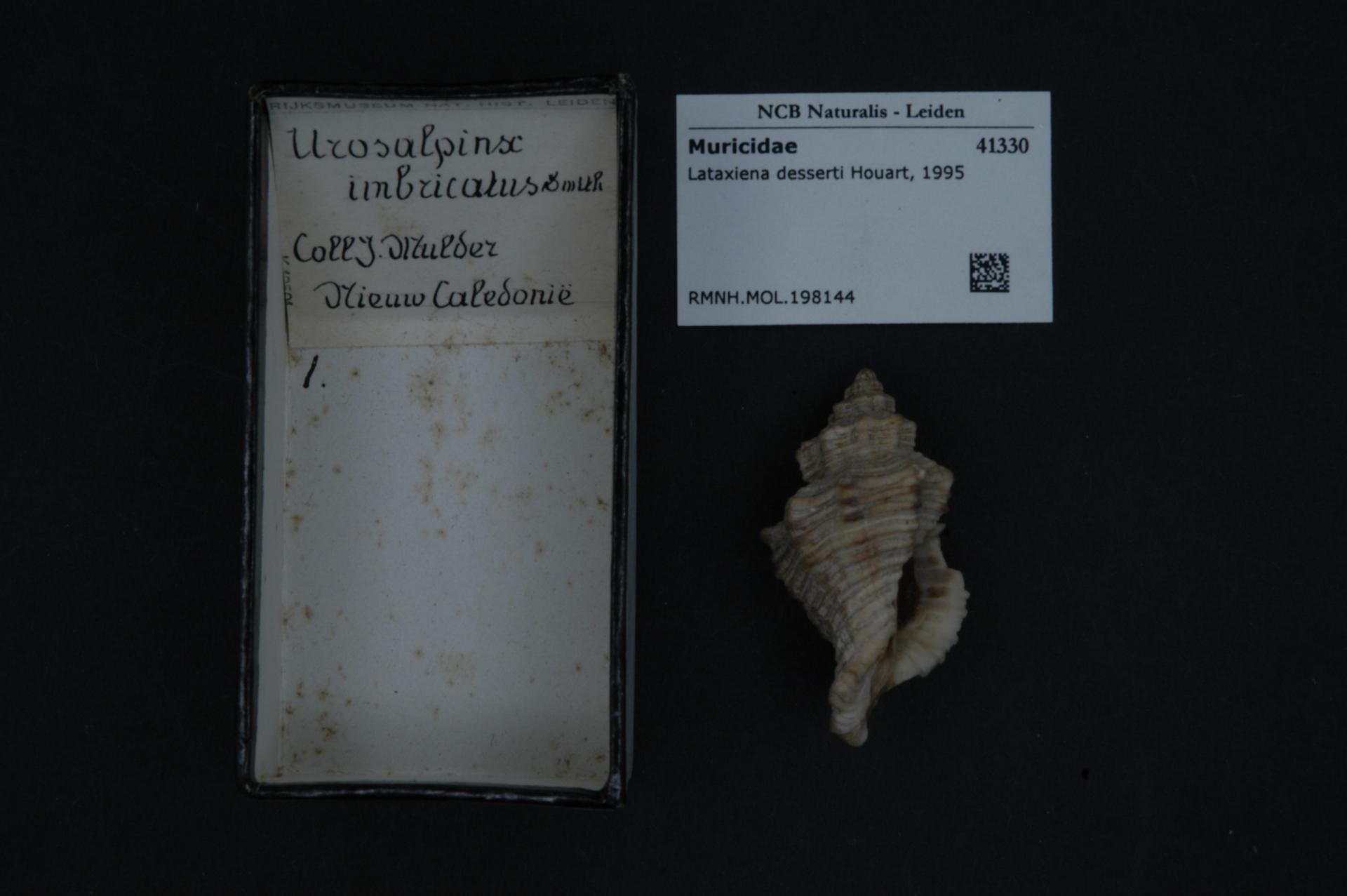

Scientific classification
- Kingdom: Animalia
- Phylum: Mollusca
- Class: Gastropoda
- Subclass: Caenogastropoda
- Order: Neogastropoda
- Family: Muricidae
- Genus: Lataxiena
- Species: L. desserti

Binomial name
- Lataxiena desserti Houart, 1995

Synonyms
- Fusus imbricatus E.A. Smith, 1876

= Lataxiena desserti =

Species of gastropod

Lataxiena desserti is a species of sea snail, a marine gastropod mollusc in the family Muricidae, the murex snails or rock snails.
