= Lataxiena bombayana =

Scientific classification
- Kingdom: Animalia
- Phylum: Mollusca
- Class: Gastropoda
- Subclass: Caenogastropoda
- Order: Neogastropoda
- Family: Muricidae
- Genus: Lataxiena
- Species: L. bombayana

Binomial name
- Lataxiena bombayana (Melvill, 1893)

Synonyms
- Murex bombayanus Melvill, 1893

Species of gastropod

Lataxiena bombayana is a species of sea snail, a marine gastropod mollusc in the family Muricidae, the murex snails or rock snails.
