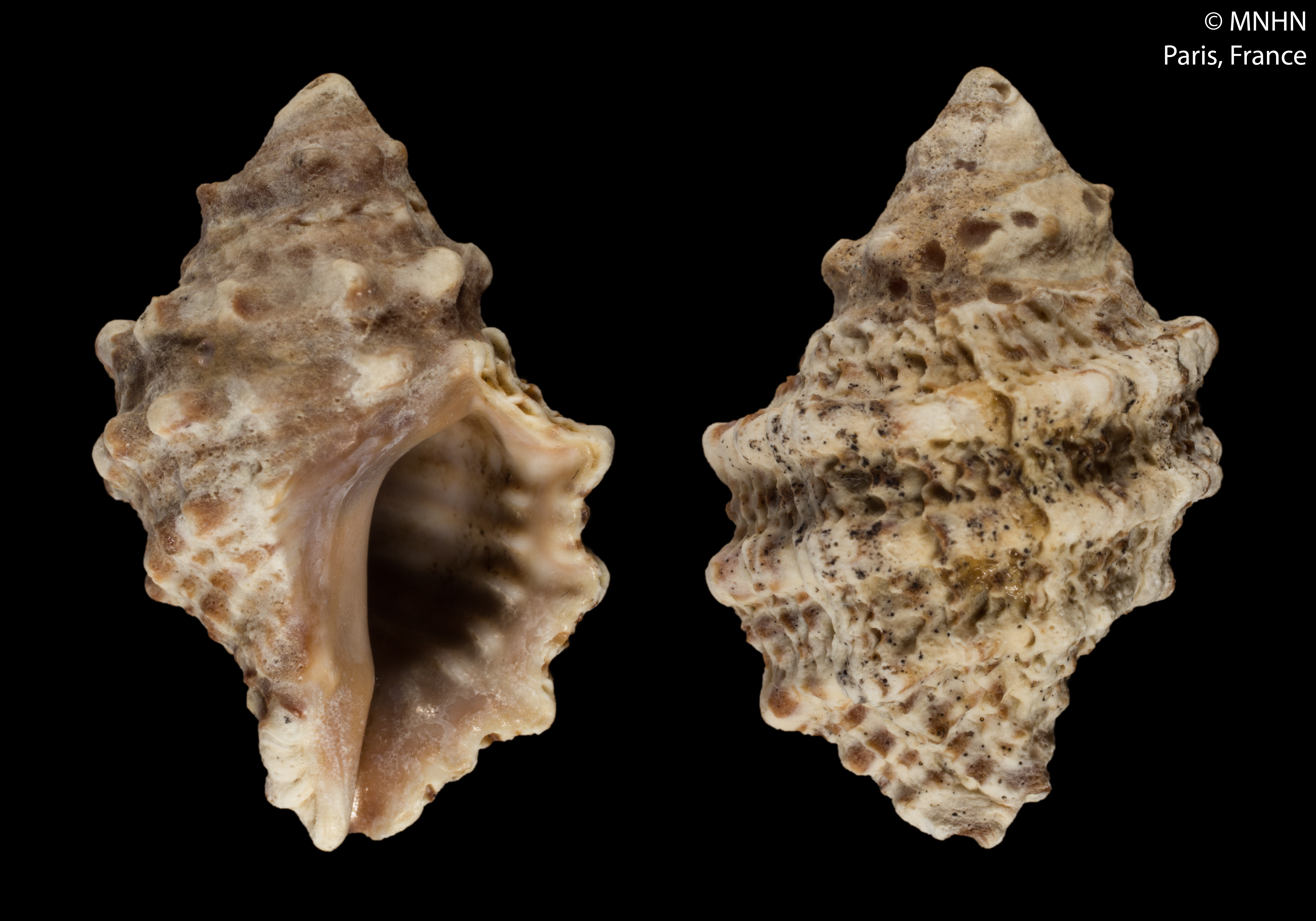
- Shell of Haustrum scobina (lerctotype at MNHN, Paris)

Scientific classification
- Kingdom: Animalia
- Phylum: Mollusca
- Class: Gastropoda
- Subclass: Caenogastropoda
- Order: Neogastropoda
- Family: Muricidae
- Genus: Haustrum
- Species: H. scobina

Binomial name
- Haustrum scobina (Quoy & Gaimard, 1833)

Synonyms
- Lepsiella scobina (Quoy & Gaimard, 1833); Purpura rugosa Quoy & Gaimard, 1833; Purpura scobina Quoy & Gaimard, 1833; Purpura scobina var. rutila Suter, 1899; Purpura tristis Dunker in Dunker & Zelabor, 1866

= Haustrum scobina =

Species of mollusc

Haustrum scobina, or the oyster borer, is a species of predatory sea snail, a marine gastropod mollusk in the family Muricidae, the murex snails or rock snails.

Oyster borers use a mucous layer that surrounds the entrance to their shell to prevent desiccation in the midlittoral and high tidal zones. Oyster Borers are frequently found in crevices which have more protection from predators, higher water availability, lower temperature, extremes in salinity and protection from the sun and wind.

== Description ==
The length of the shell varies between 14 mm and 35 mm. It is white and slightly beige colored with specks of varying shades of brown.

(Original description in Latin of Purpura tristis) The shell is ovate-subconical and is composed of five or six convex whorls that are divided by a distinct suture. The spire is exserted and slightly angled in the middle of the whorls. The body whorl is twice as large as the others and is transversely ribbed. The odd-numbered ribs are articulated with black or brown spots against a grayish-white background color, which forms the foundation of the pattern. The columella is slightly excavated and is chestnut or reddish-brown in color. The outer lip is not thickened, is patterned with black and white, and is grooved inside. The siphonal canal is rather short and nearly straight, while the aperture throat is a dark blackish-brown.

== Distribution ==
It is endemic to New Zealand and is found off the North, South, Stewart and the Chatham Islands. This species generally prefers inter-tidal zones, such as the Hauraki Gulf of Auckland, New Zealand.
