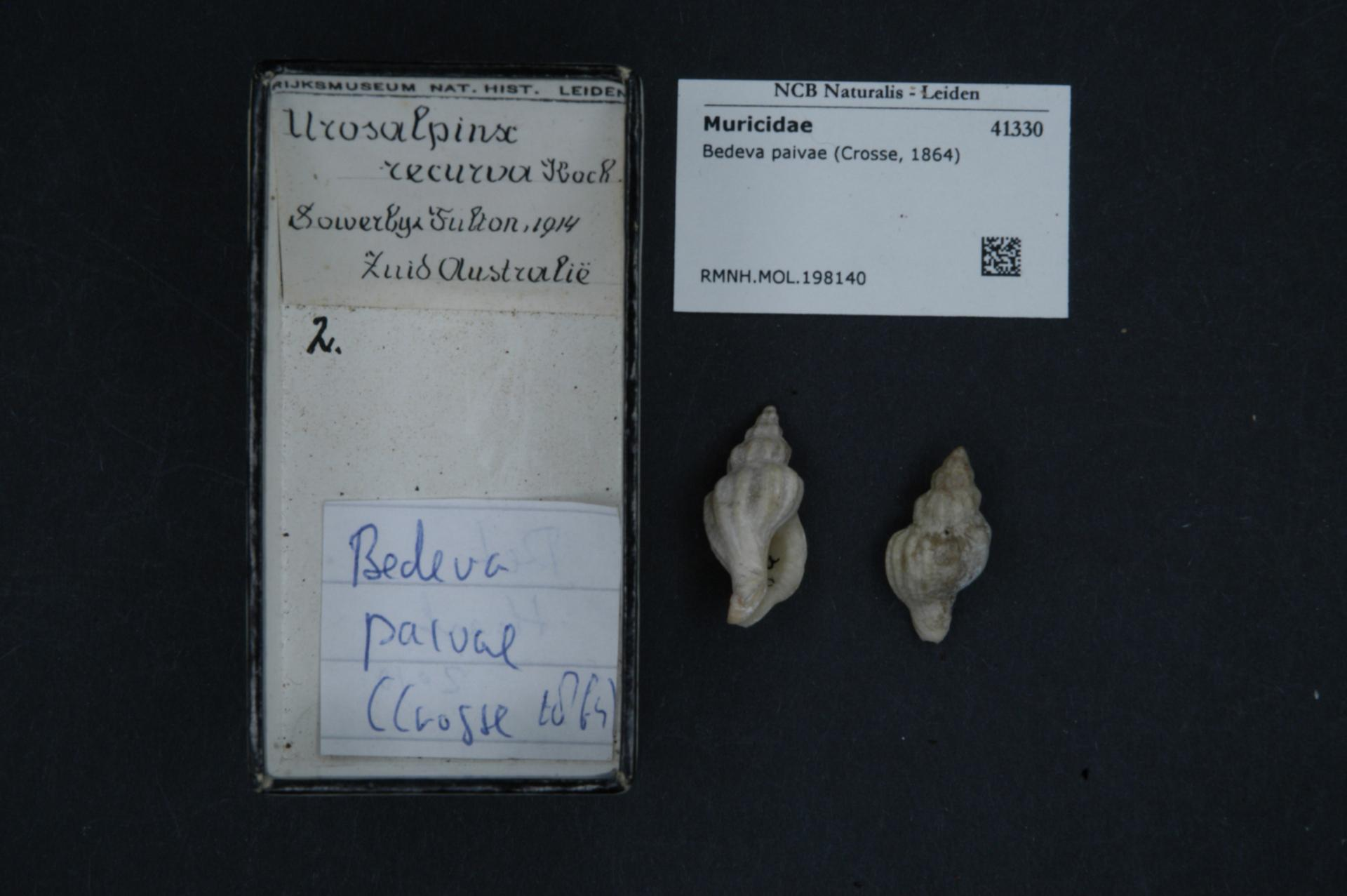
- Bedeva paivae shells

Scientific classification
- Kingdom: Animalia
- Phylum: Mollusca
- Class: Gastropoda
- Subclass: Caenogastropoda
- Order: Neogastropoda
- Family: Muricidae
- Genus: Bedeva
- Species: B. paivae

Binomial name
- Bedeva paivae (Crosse, 1864)

Synonyms
- Bedeva pensa Iredale, 1940; Murex hermanni Velain, 1877; Trophon assisi Tenison-Woods, 1877; Trophon australis Tenison-Woods, 1876; Trophon hanleyi Angas, 1867; Trophon paivae Crosse, 1864; Trophon squamosissima Tenison-Woods, 1879

= Bedeva paivae =

Species of gastropod

Bedeva paivae is a species of sea snail, a marine gastropod mollusc in the family Muricidae, the murex snails or rock snails.

== Distribution ==
The holotype of this marine species was found off Antarctica between the Isles Saint Paul and Amsterdam.
