= Lataxiena lutescena =

Scientific classification
- Kingdom: Animalia
- Phylum: Mollusca
- Class: Gastropoda
- Subclass: Caenogastropoda
- Order: Neogastropoda
- Family: Muricidae
- Genus: Lataxiena
- Species: L. lutescena

Binomial name
- Lataxiena lutescena Zhang & Zhang, 2015

Species of gastropod

Lataxiena lutescena is a species of sea snail, a marine gastropod mollusc, in the family Muricidae, the murex snails or rock snails. This species was recognized during a reidentification of the Muricidae collection. The name of this species is derived from the Latin word "lutescena", which means "creamy". This refers to the species' creamy, yellow peristome.
