= Bedeva sumatraensis =

Scientific classification
- Kingdom: Animalia
- Phylum: Mollusca
- Class: Gastropoda
- Subclass: Caenogastropoda
- Order: Neogastropoda
- Family: Muricidae
- Genus: Bedeva
- Species: B. sumatraensis

Binomial name
- Bedeva sumatraensis (Thiele, 1925)

Synonyms
- Ocinebra sumatraensis Thiele, 1925

Species of gastropod

Bedeva sumatraensis is a species of sea snail, a marine gastropod mollusc in the family Muricidae, the murex snails or rock snails.
