= Plicopurpura patula =

- A shell of Plicopurpura patula

Scientific classification
- Kingdom: Animalia
- Phylum: Mollusca
- Class: Gastropoda
- Subclass: Caenogastropoda
- Order: Neogastropoda
- Family: Muricidae
- Genus: Plicopurpura
- Species: P. patula

Binomial name
- Plicopurpura patula (Linnaeus, 1758)

Synonyms
- Buccinum patulum Linnaeus, 1758

Species of gastropod

Plicopurpura patula is a species of sea snail, a marine gastropod mollusk in the family Muricidae, the murex snails or rock snails.

== Distribution ==
The widemouth rockshell or wide-mouthed purpura is a tropical Western Atlantic species. Its biogeographical distribution range extends along the Atlantic coast of America from Florida to Trinidade, and includes the Caribbean Sea. Individuals are found in the intertidal splash zones on hard rocky shorelines facing regular wave action. Sporadically, the species may occur in the NE Atlantic, where it was first recorded in 2012 in the Atlantic coast of North Spain. However, currently there are no evidences that the widemouth rockshell forms stable populations in the NE Atlantic.
