= Phycothais botanica =

Scientific classification
- Kingdom: Animalia
- Phylum: Mollusca
- Class: Gastropoda
- Subclass: Caenogastropoda
- Order: Neogastropoda
- Family: Muricidae
- Genus: Phycothais
- Species: P. botanica

Binomial name
- Phycothais botanica (Hedley, 1918)

Synonyms
- Lepsiella botanica Hedley, 1918; Purpura botanica Hedley, 1918 (original combination); Purpura neglecta Angas, 1867; Purpura (Stramonita) neglecta Angas, G.F. 1867; † Ricinula subreticulata Tate, 1888 (uncertain synonym)

Species of gastropod

Phycothais botanica is a species of sea snail, a marine gastropod mollusc in the family Muricidae, the murex snails or rock snails.

== Distribution ==
This marine species is endemic to Australia and occurs off New South Wales, Queensland, Tasmania and Victoria.
