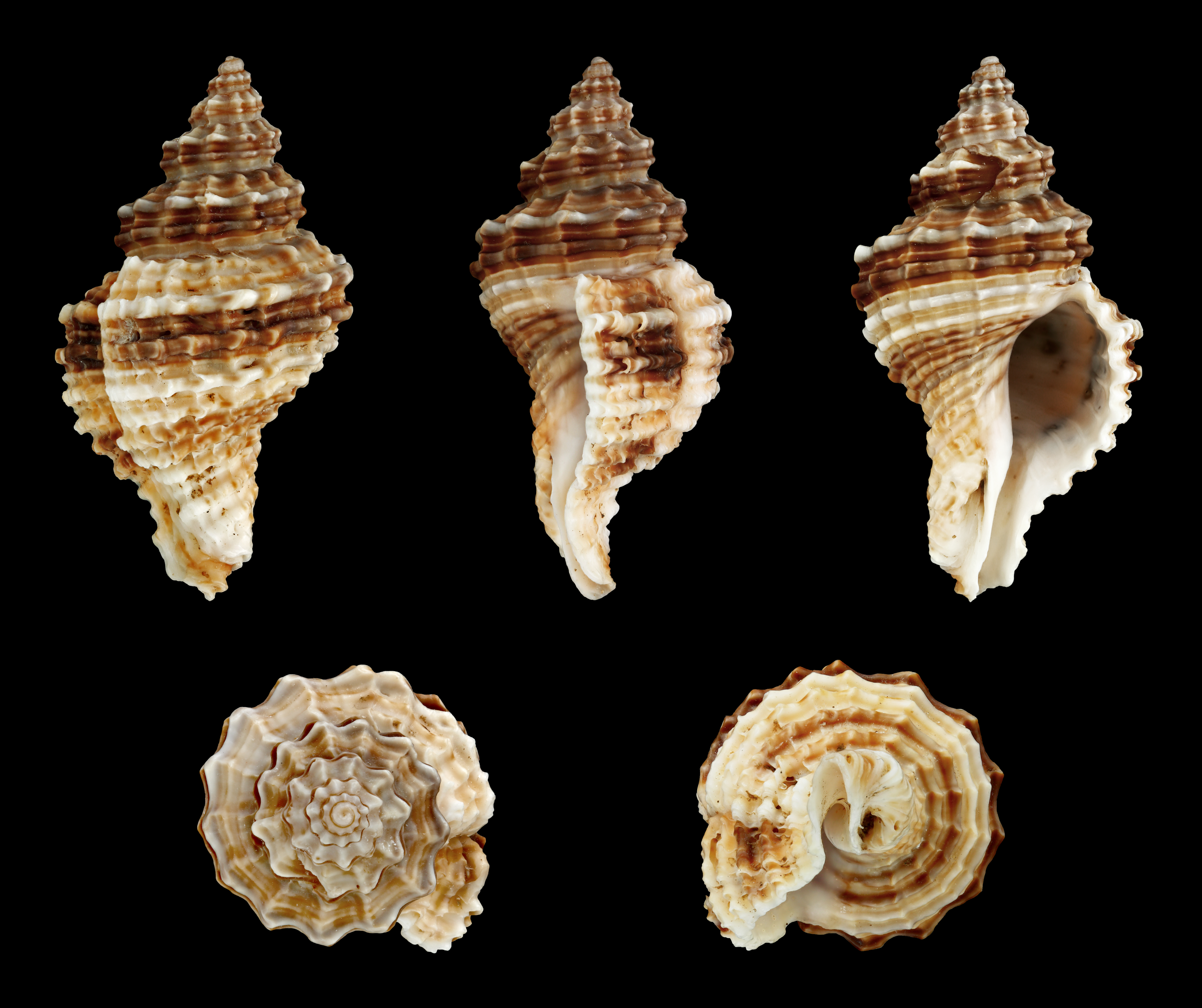
- Lataxiena fimbriata (Hinds, 1844)

Scientific classification
- Kingdom: Animalia
- Phylum: Mollusca
- Class: Gastropoda
- Subclass: Caenogastropoda
- Order: Neogastropoda
- Superfamily: Muricoidea
- Family: Muricidae
- Subfamily: Ergalataxinae
- Genus: Lataxiena; Jousseaume, 1883

Type species
- Lataxiena lataxiena Jousseaume, 1883

Synonyms
- Cumella Jousseaume, 1898 (Invalid: junior homonym of Cumella Sars, 1865 [Crustacea])

= Lataxiena =

Genus of gastropods

Lataxiena is a genus of sea snails, marine gastropod mollusks in the family Muricidae, the murex snails or rock snails.

Lataxiena lataxiena Jousseaume, 1883 is the type species by tautonomy (= Trophon fimbriatus Hinds, 1844).

== Species ==
Species within the genus Lataxiena include:

- Lataxiena blosvillei (Deshayes, 1832)
- Lataxiena bombayana (Melvill, 1893)
- Lataxiena cumella (Jousseaume, 1898)
- Lataxiena desserti Houart, 1995
- Lataxiena fimbriata (Hinds, 1844)
- Lataxiena habropenos Houart, 1995
- Lataxiena lutescena Zhang & Zhang, 2014
- Lataxiena solenosteiroides Houart, Fraussen & Barbier, 2013

Species brought into synonymy

- Lataxiena birileffi (Lischke, 1871): synonym of Bedevina birileffi (Lischke, 1871)
- Lataxiena elegans Jousseaume, 1883: synonym of Lataxiena fimbriata (Hinds, 1844)
- Lataxiena lataxiena Jousseaume, 1883: synonym of Lataxiena fimbriata (Hinds, 1844)
- Lataxiena mixta Houart, 1995: synonym of Orania mixta Houart, 1995
- Lataxiena taiwanica Shikama, 1978: synonym of Indothais sacellum (Gmelin, 1791)
