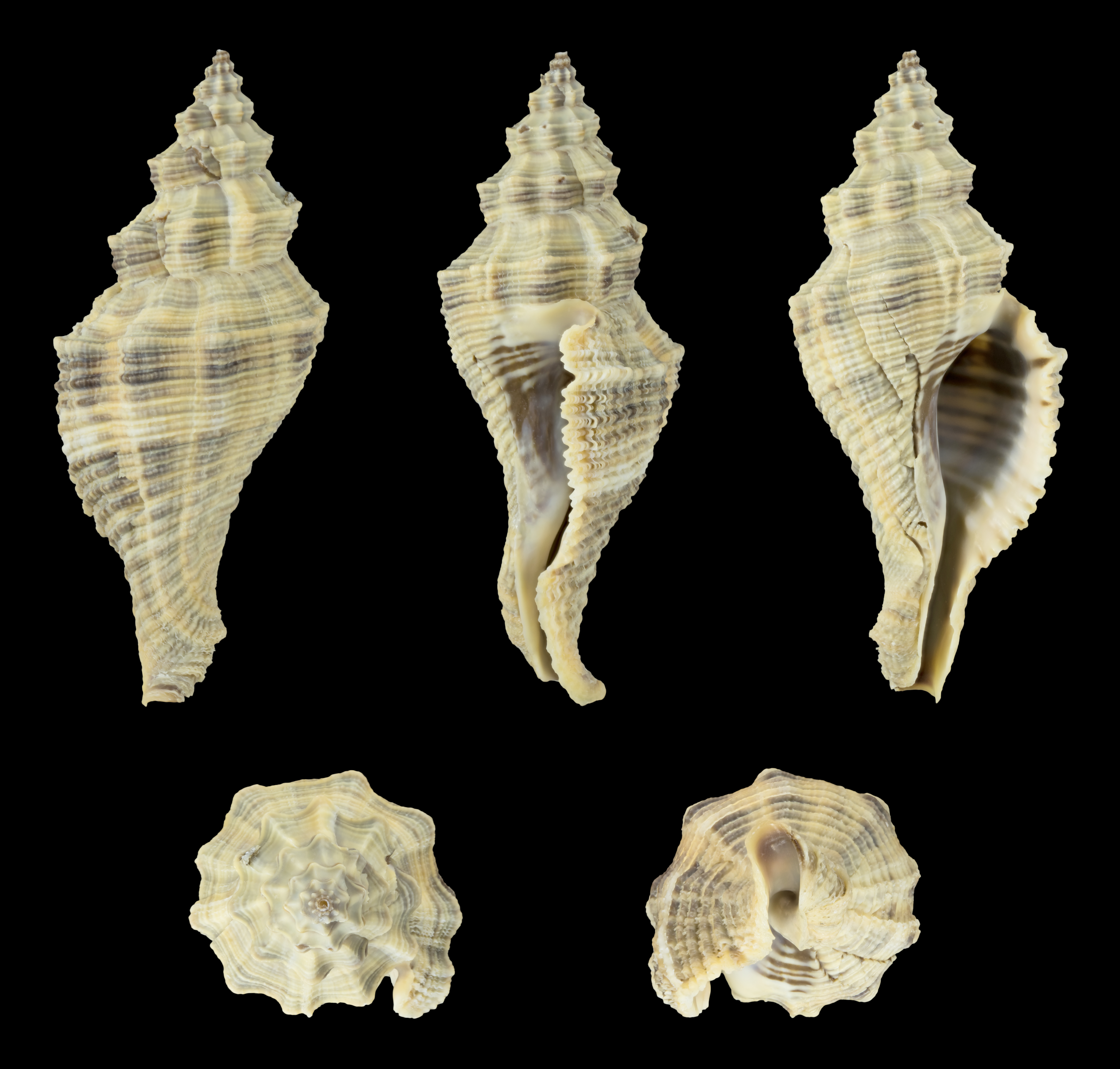
- Shell of Lataxiena blosvillei

Scientific classification
- Kingdom: Animalia
- Phylum: Mollusca
- Class: Gastropoda
- Subclass: Caenogastropoda
- Order: Neogastropoda
- Family: Muricidae
- Genus: Lataxiena
- Species: L. blosvillei

Binomial name
- Lataxiena blosvillei (Deshayes, 1832)

Synonyms
- Bedeva blosvillei (Deshayes, 1832); Bedeva vapida Woolacott, 1957; Fusus blosvillei Deshayes, 1832; Fusus heptagonalis Reeve, 1847; Latirus blosvillei (Deshayes, 1832); Tudicla blosvillei (Deshayes, 1832)

= Lataxiena blosvillei =

Species of gastropod

Lataxiena blosvillei is a species of sea snail, a marine gastropod mollusc in the family Muricidae, the murex snails or rock snails.

== Description ==
The length of the shell attains 31.8 mm.

== Distribution ==
This marine species occurs off Sri Lanka.
