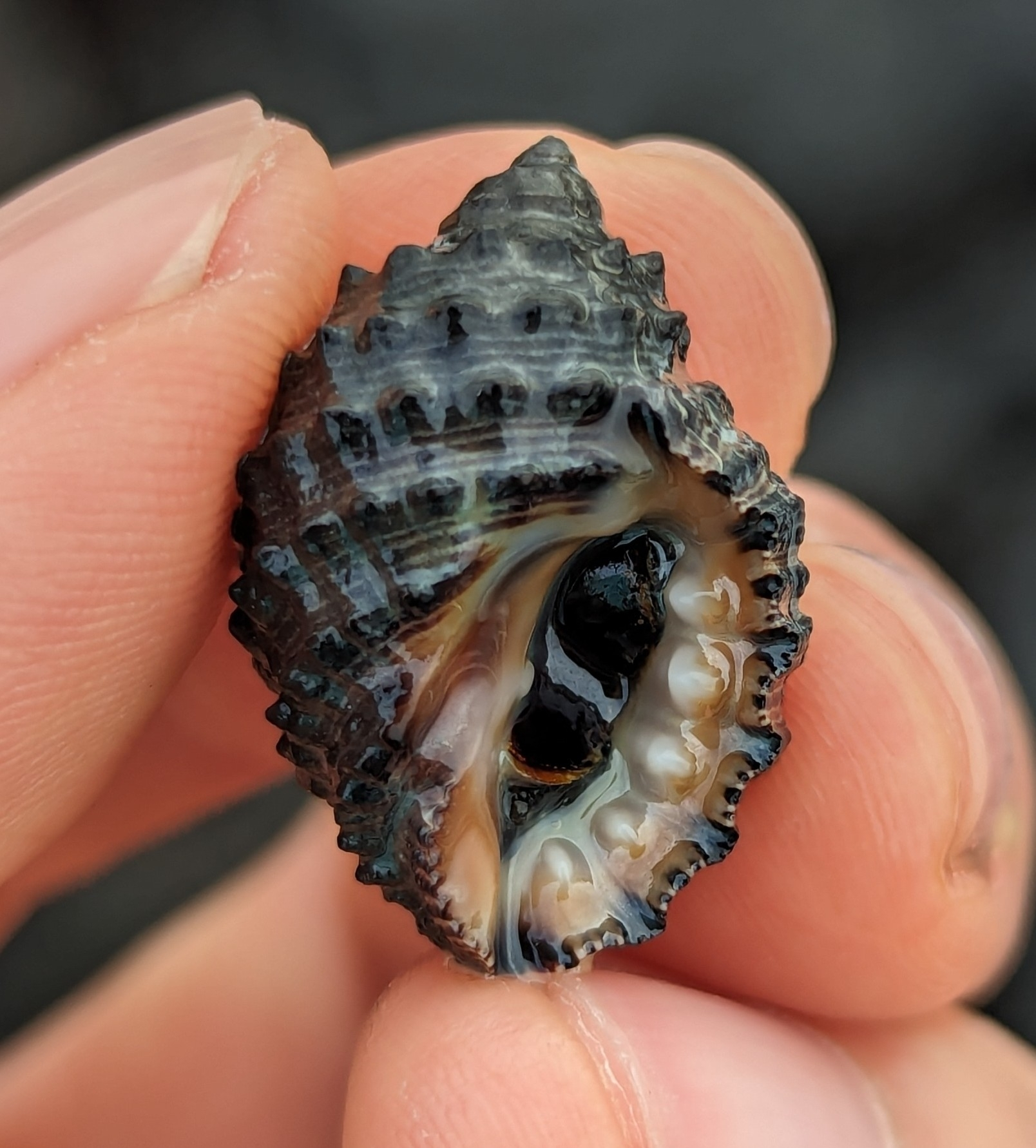

Scientific classification
- Kingdom: Animalia
- Phylum: Mollusca
- Class: Gastropoda
- Subclass: Caenogastropoda
- Order: Neogastropoda
- Family: Muricidae
- Genus: Plicopurpura
- Species: P. columellaris

Binomial name
- Plicopurpura columellaris (Lamarck, 1816)

Synonyms
- Buccinum rudolphi Wood, 1828; Haustrum dentex Perry, 1811; Purpura columellaris Lamarck, 1816

= Plicopurpura columellaris =

Species of gastropod

Plicopurpura columellaris is a species of sea snail, a marine gastropod mollusk in the family Muricidae.

The species is traditionally used by coastal Mixtec people in Oaxaca to create purple dye by "milking" ink from the snails. Their ink contains neurotoxins that are used to paralyze prey, but they are harmless to humans.

Plicopurpura columellaris was once native to the entire west coast of Central America, as well as parts of Mexico and Colombia, but the species is now restricted to the Huatulco National Park. The species began to decline in population in the 1980s, when Japanese companies began to kill them to produce dye for kimonos. The snails are not killed by the extraction of ink, but commercial snail milkers often drowned the snails or let them die in the sun after gathering it. The Mexican government categorized Plicopurpura columellaris as a protected species in 1994. Since then, only indigenous Mixtec people from Pinotepa de Don Luis have been allowed to milk them. The species continues to face threats from illegal poaching.
