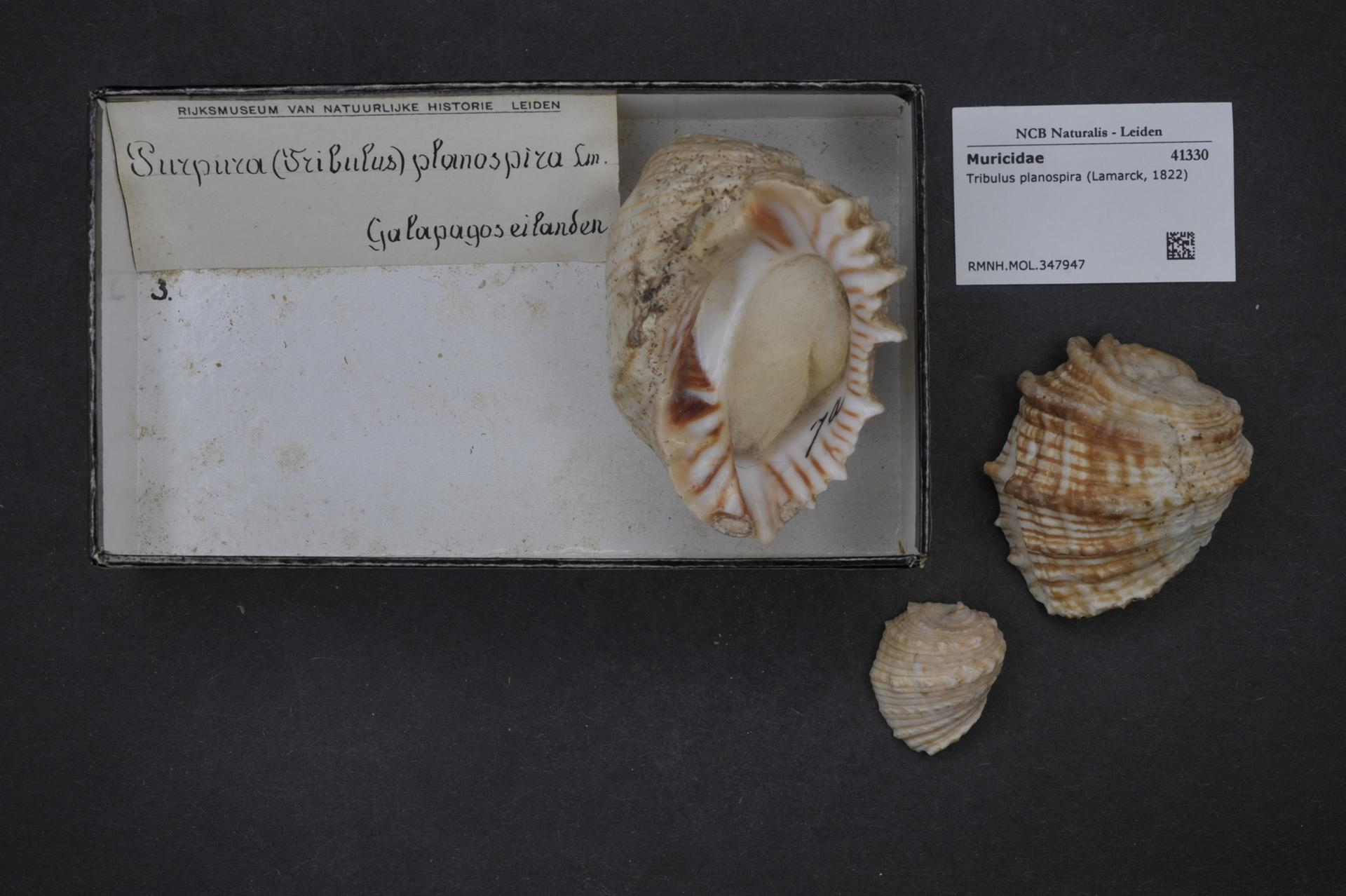
- Tribulus planospira shells

Scientific classification
- Kingdom: Animalia
- Phylum: Mollusca
- Class: Gastropoda
- Subclass: Caenogastropoda
- Order: Neogastropoda
- Family: Muricidae
- Genus: Tribulus; H. Adams & A. Adams, 1853
- Species: T. planospira

Binomial name
- Tribulus planospira (Lamarck, 1822)

Synonyms
- Genus: Murex (Tribulus); Planithais Bayle in P. Fischer, 1884; Purpura (Tribulus) H. Adams & A. Adams, 1853; Thais (Tribulus) H. Adams & A. Adams, 1853; Species: Haustrum pictum Perry, 1811; Purpura lineata Lamarck, 1816; Purpura planospira Lamarck, 1822

= Tribulus planospira =

Species of gastropod

Tribulus planospira is a species of sea snail, a marine gastropod mollusk in the family Muricidae, the murex snails or rock snails.

As of 2019, it is the only species in the genus Tribulus included in the World Register of Marine Species. Tribulus has previously been considered a subgenus of the genera Murex, Purpura, and Thais.

== Description ==
The spire is depressed. The whorls are simple, the body whorl ventricose. The aperture is wide. The columella is arcuated. The inner lip is excavated, corrugated at the fore part.
