= Phycothais texturata =

Scientific classification
- Kingdom: Animalia
- Phylum: Mollusca
- Class: Gastropoda
- Subclass: Caenogastropoda
- Order: Neogastropoda
- Family: Muricidae
- Genus: Phycothais
- Species: P. texturata

Binomial name
- Phycothais texturata (E.A. Smith, 1904)

Synonyms
- Bedeva texturata (E.A. Smith, 1904); Purpura texturata Smith, 1904

Species of gastropod

Phycothais texturata is a species of sea snail, a marine gastropod mollusk in the family Muricidae, the murex snails or rock snails.
