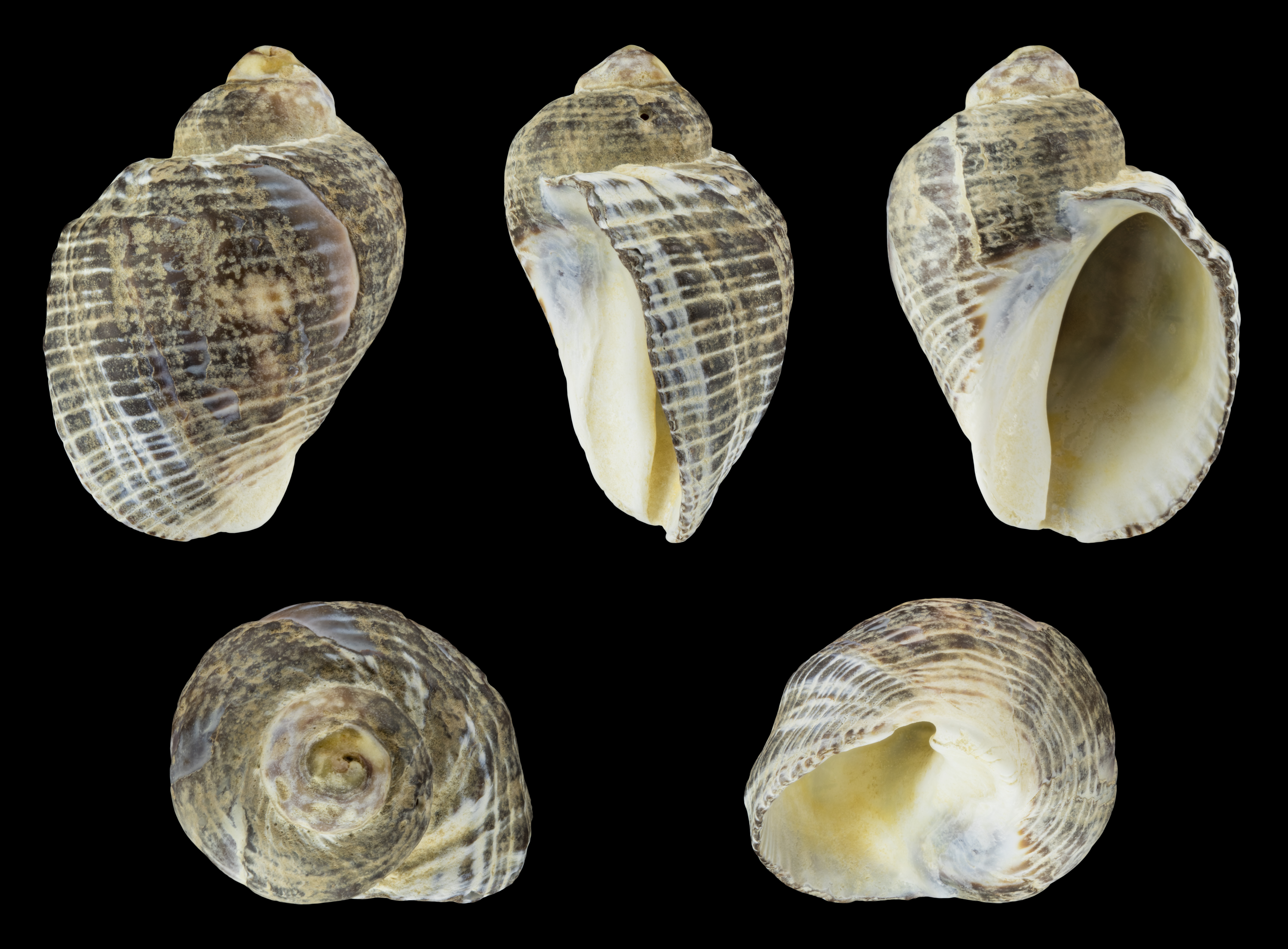

Scientific classification
- Kingdom: Animalia
- Phylum: Mollusca
- Class: Gastropoda
- Subclass: Caenogastropoda
- Order: Neogastropoda
- Family: Muricidae
- Genus: Haustrum
- Species: H. haustorium

Binomial name
- Haustrum haustorium (Gmelin, 1791)

= Haustrum haustorium =

Species of gastropod

Haustrum haustorium, common name: the brown or dark rock shell, is a large species of predatory sea snail, a marine gastropod mollusc in the family Muricidae, the murex snails or rock snails.

== Taxonomy ==
Haustrum haustorium used to be the only species in the genus Haustrum. However, Beu (2004) reclassified a number of New Zealand's whelks, considering species in the genus Lepsiella to be synonymous with the genus Haustrum.

== Distribution ==
This species occurs in New Zealand.

== Shell description ==
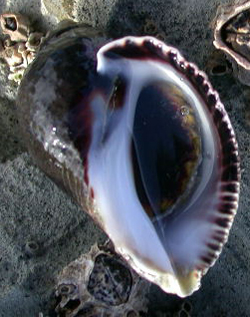
Haustrum haustorium adult, showing the callus, and the thin lip

A reliable characteristic for distinguishing Haustum haustorium from its congeners is the angle by which the aperture lip inserts on the shell: In Haustrum haustorium the angle is near-perpendicular, whereas in other species the angle is more acute (~45 degrees). Tan (2003) provides the most recent review.

== Ecology ==
=== Habitat ===
This rock snail's typical habitat is the mid and lower eulittoral zone of New Zealand's semi-exposed rocky intertidal shores. It is less common on algal-dominated sheltered shores.
