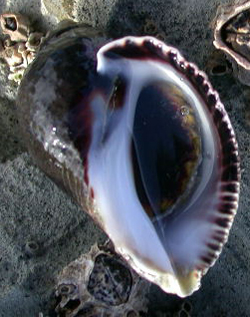
- shell of Haustrum haustorium

Scientific classification
- Kingdom: Animalia
- Phylum: Mollusca
- Class: Gastropoda
- Subclass: Caenogastropoda
- Order: Neogastropoda
- Superfamily: Muricoidea
- Family: Muricidae
- Subfamily: Haustrinae; Tan, 2003

Genera
- See text

= Haustrinae =

Subfamily of gastropods

Haustrinae is a taxonomic subfamily of predatory sea snails, marine gastropod mollusks in the family Muricidae, the murex shells or rock shells.

The genera in this family were previously grouped in a larger subfamily, the Ocenebrinae.

== Genera ==
Genera within the subfamily Haustrinae include:

- Bedeva Iredale, 1924
- Haustrum Perry, 1811 - synonyms: Lepsiella Iredale, 1912; Lepsithais Finlay, 1928

Genera brought into synonymy

- Lepsia Hutton, 1883: synonym of Haustrum Perry, 1811 (invalid: junior homonym of Lepsia Quoy, 1839 [Crustacea])
- Lepsiella Iredale, 1912: synonym of Haustrum Perry, 1811
- Lepsithais Finlay, 1928: synonym of Haustrum Perry, 1811
- Otahua Marwick, 1948: synonym of Bedeva Iredale, 1924
