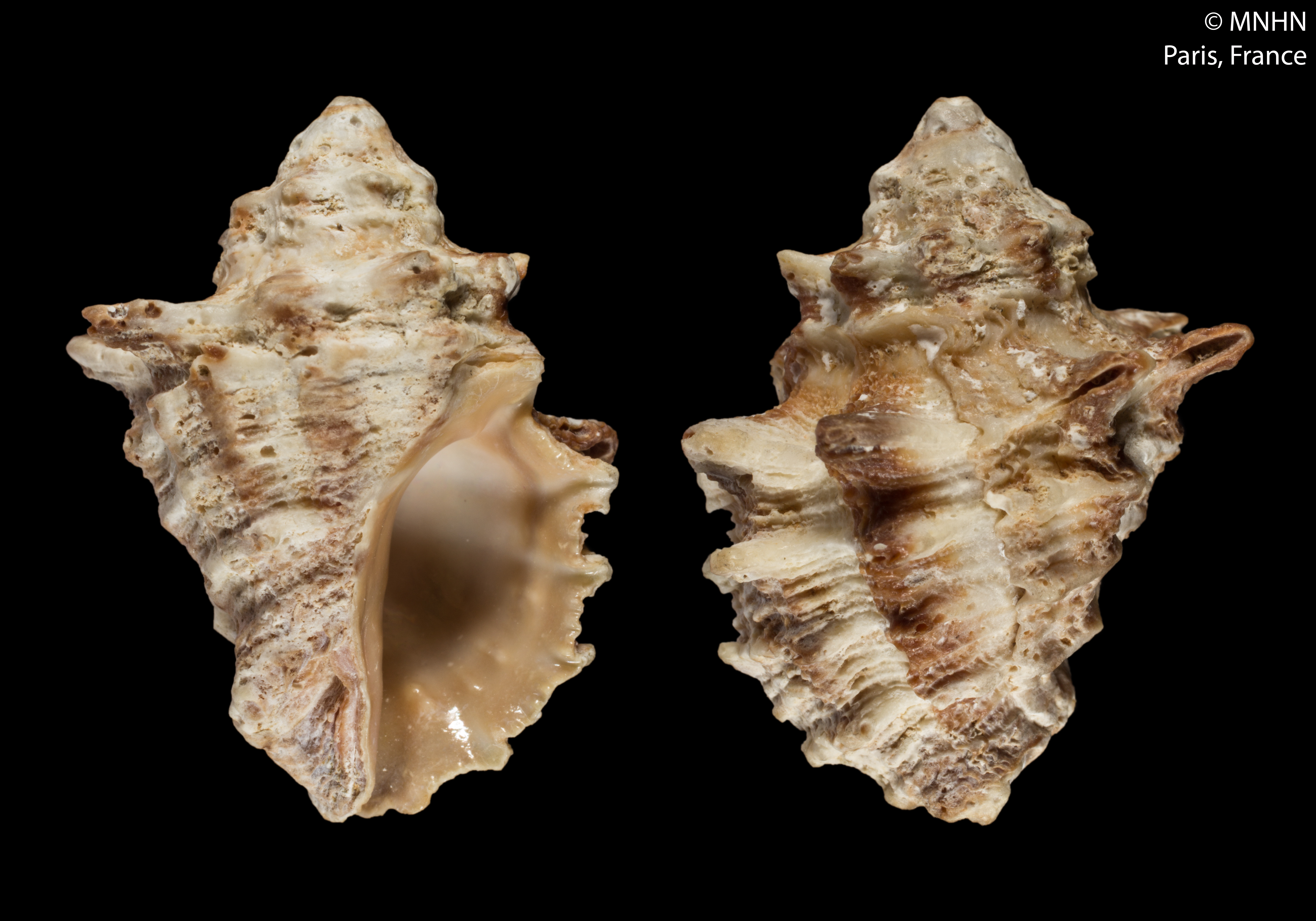
- Shell of Semiricinula squamigera (syntype at MNHN, Paris)

Scientific classification
- Kingdom: Animalia
- Phylum: Mollusca
- Class: Gastropoda
- Subclass: Caenogastropoda
- Order: Neogastropoda
- Family: Muricidae
- Subfamily: Rapaninae
- Genus: Semiricinula
- Species: S. squamigera

Binomial name
- Semiricinula squamigera (Deshayes, 1832)

Synonyms
- Purpura squamigera Deshayes, 1832; Thais squamigera (Deshayes, 1834)

= Semiricinula squamigera =

Species of gastropod

Semiricinula squamigera is a species of sea snail, a marine gastropod mollusk, in the family Muricidae, the murex snails or rock snails.

== Distribution ==
This marine species occurs off the Sunda Islands, Indonesia.
