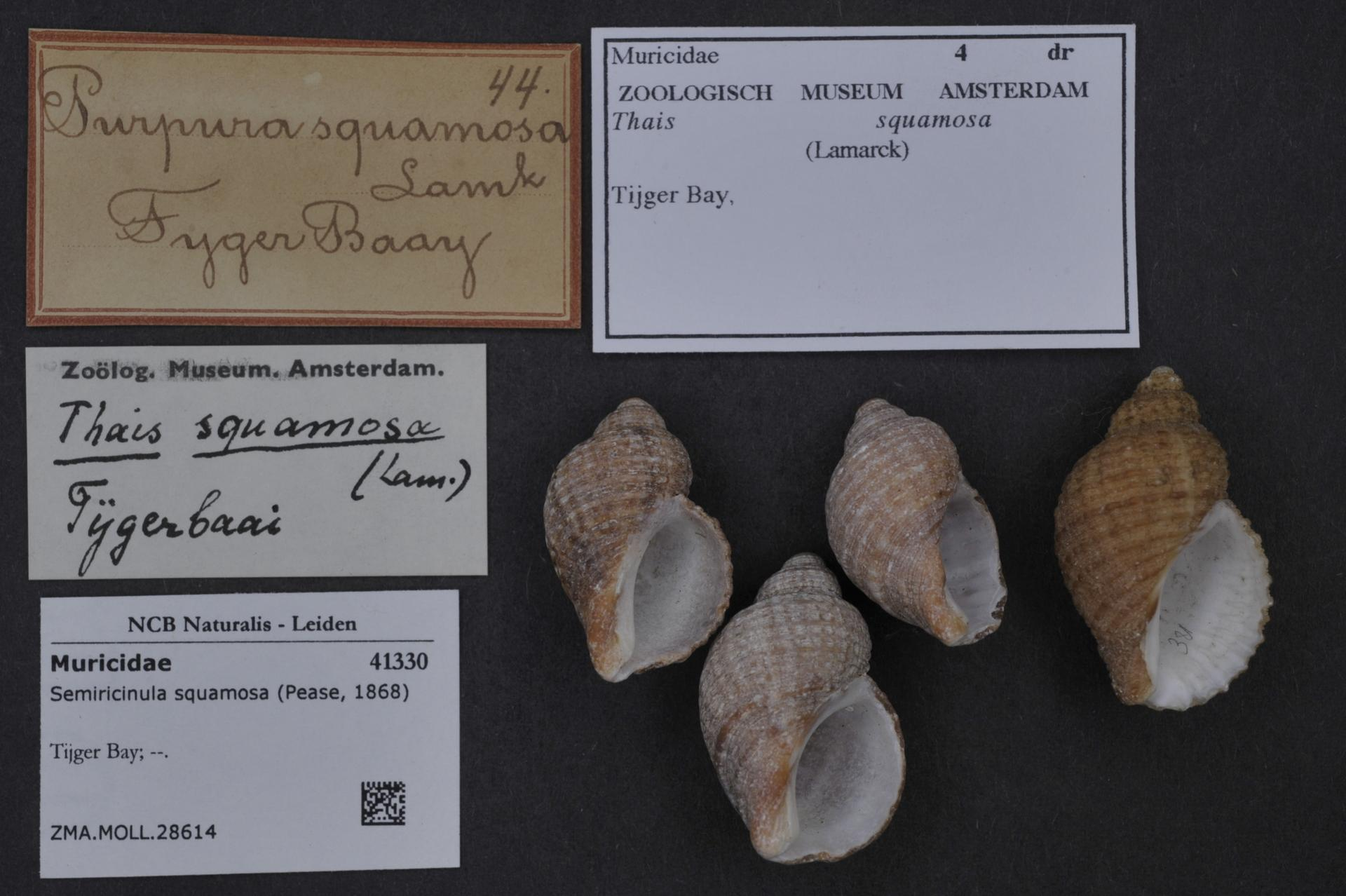
- Semiricinula squamosa

Scientific classification
- Kingdom: Animalia
- Phylum: Mollusca
- Class: Gastropoda
- Subclass: Caenogastropoda
- Order: Neogastropoda
- Superfamily: Muricoidea
- Family: Muricidae
- Subfamily: Rapaninae
- Genus: Semiricinula; Martens, 1903

Type species
- Purpura turbinoides Blainville, 1832

Synonyms
- Purpura (Semiricinula) E. von Martens, 1879 (original rank); Ricinula (Semiricinula) E. von Martens, 1879; Thais (Semiricinula) E. von Martens, 1879

= Semiricinula =

Genus of gastropods

Semiricinula is a genus of sea snails, marine gastropod mollusks in the subfamily Rapaninae of the family Muricidae, the murex snails or rock snails.

== Species ==
Species within the genus Semiricinula include:

- Semiricinula bozzettii Houart & Héros, 2013
- Semiricinula fusca Küster, 1862
- Semiricinula hadrolineae (Houart, 1996)
- Semiricinula konkanensis (Melvill, 1893)
- Semiricinula muricina (Blainville, 1832)
- Semiricinula muricoides (Blainville, 1832)
- Semiricinula squamigera (Deshayes, 1832)
- Semiricinula squamosa (Pease, 1868)
- Semiricinula tissoti (Petit de la Saussaye, 1852)
- Semiricinula tongasoa Bozzetti, 2018
- Semiricinula turbinoides (Blainville, 1832)

Species brought into synonymy

- Semiricinula chrysostoma (Deshayes, 1844): synonym of Morula chrysostoma (Deshayes, 1844)
- Semiricinula marginatra (Blainville, 1832): synonym of Neothais marginatra (Blainville, 1832)
- Semiricinula nodosa (Hombron & Jacquinot, 1841) : synonym of Orania nodosa (Hombron & Jacquinot, 1848)
