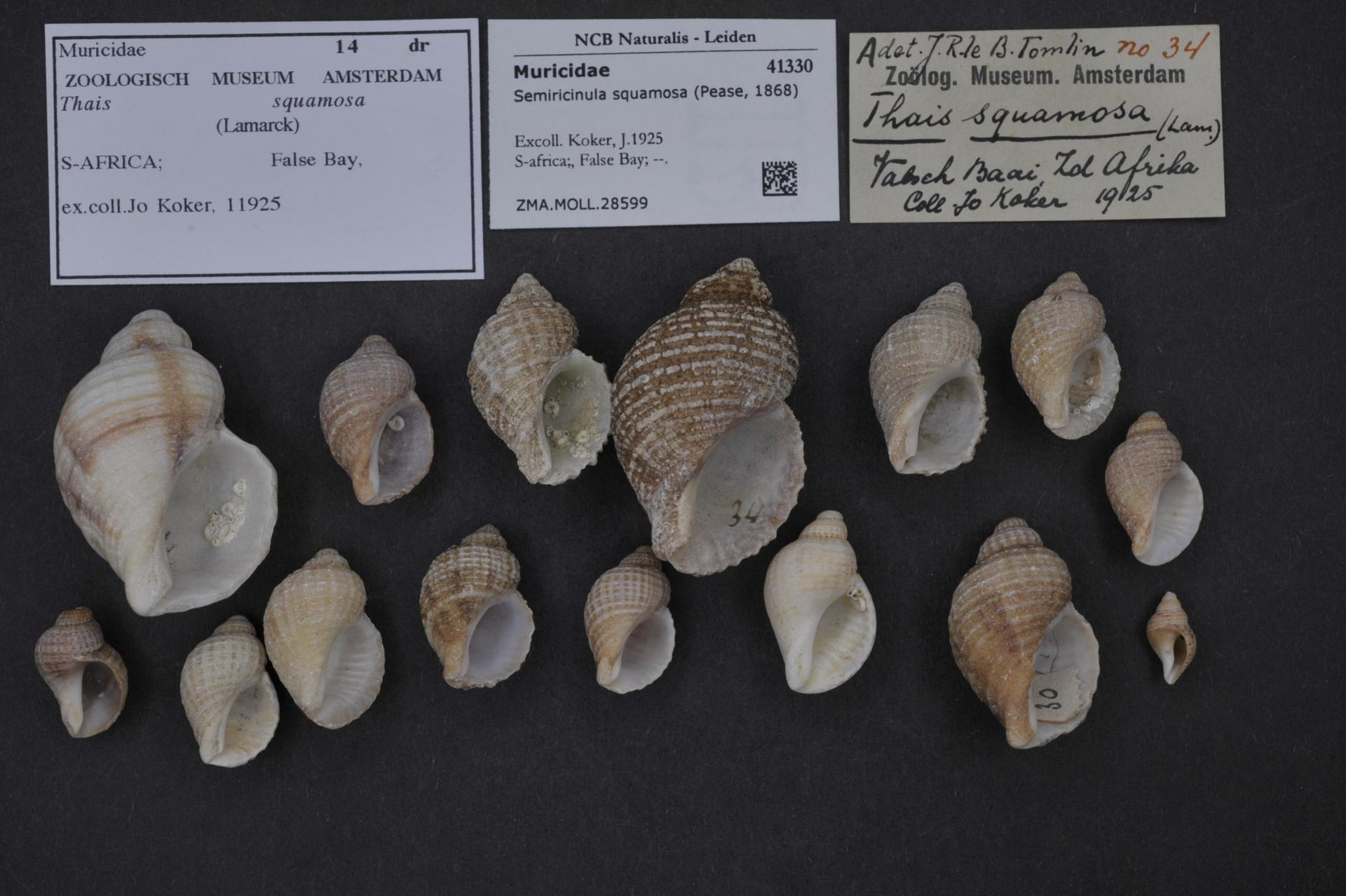

Scientific classification
- Kingdom: Animalia
- Phylum: Mollusca
- Class: Gastropoda
- Subclass: Caenogastropoda
- Order: Neogastropoda
- Family: Muricidae
- Genus: Semiricinula
- Species: S. squamosa

Binomial name
- Semiricinula squamosa (Pease, 1868)

Synonyms
- Drupa fusconigra (Dunker, 1871); Morula squamosa (Pease, 1868); Sistrum fusconigra Dunker, 1871; Sistrum squamosum Pease, 1868 (basionym); Thais fusconigra (Dunker, 1871); Thais (Thaisella) infumata Hombron, J.B. & C.H. Jacquinot, 1853; Drupella fusconigra Dunker, 1871

= Semiricinula squamosa =

Species of gastropod

Semiricinula squamosa is a species of sea snail, a marine gastropod mollusk in the family Muricidae, the murex snails or rock snails.

== Description ==
The solid shell varies in length between 20 mm and 45 mm. Its sculpture shows varices with low spines. The color is creamy white with dark brown bands, brown or mottled. The oval aperture is narrowed by protruding plaits. It has a pale color with white inner lip.

== Distribution ==
This species is distributed in shallow rocky areas in the Indian Ocean along Aldabra and Tanzania and in the Indo-West Pacific.
