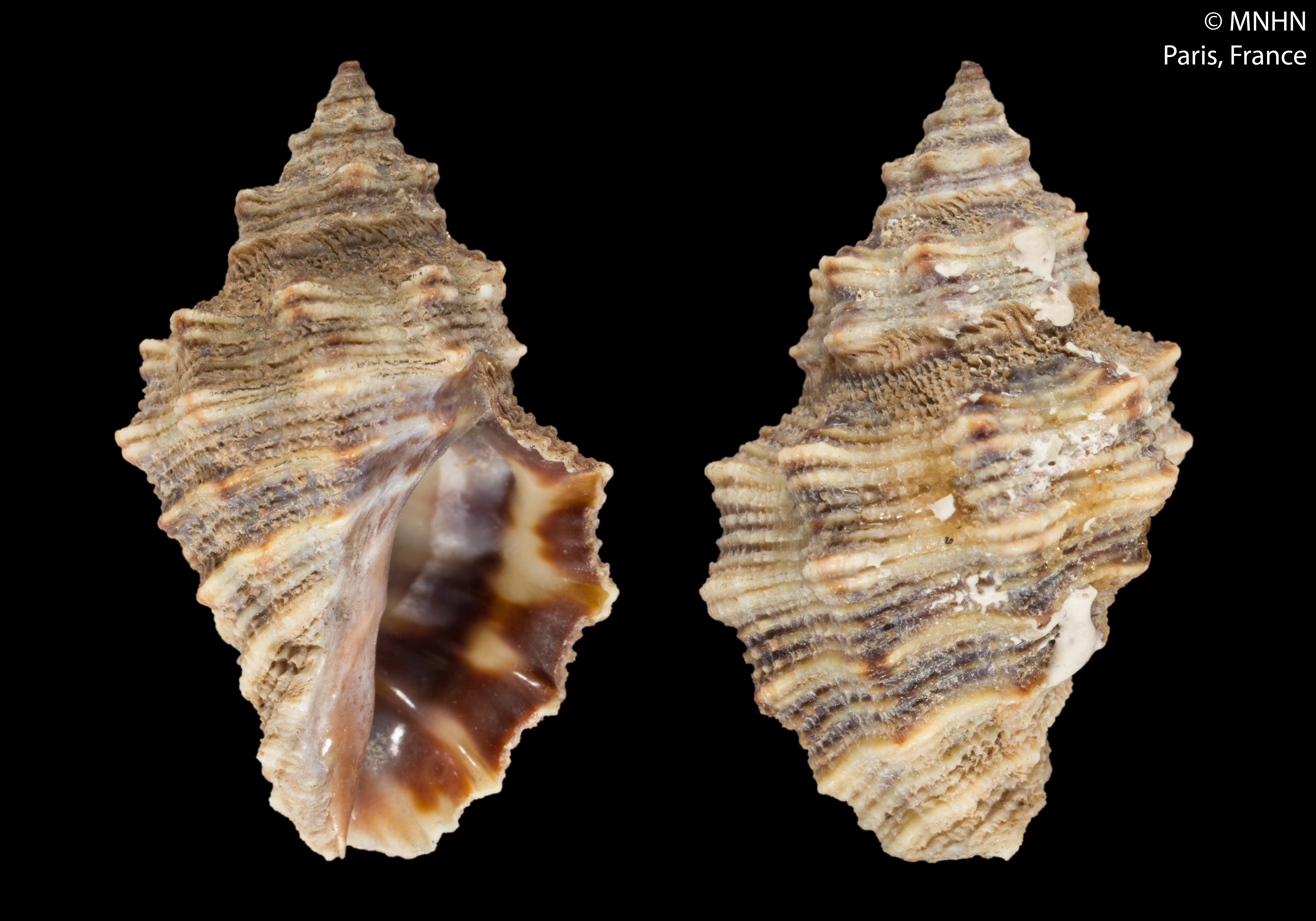

Scientific classification
- Kingdom: Animalia
- Phylum: Mollusca
- Class: Gastropoda
- Subclass: Caenogastropoda
- Order: Neogastropoda
- Superfamily: Muricoidea
- Family: Muricidae
- Subfamily: Rapaninae
- Genus: Semiricinula
- Species: S. muricina

Binomial name
- Semiricinula muricina (Blainville, 1832)

Synonyms
- Cronia muricina (Blainville, 1832); Purpura infumata Hombron & Jacquinot, 1848; Purpura muricina Blainville, 1832; Stramonita muricina (Blainville, 1832); Thais muricina (Blainville, 1832)

= Semiricinula muricina =

Species of gastropod

Semiricinula muricina is a species of sea snail, a marine gastropod mollusk, in the family Muricidae, the murex snails or rock snails.

== Distribution ==
This species occurs in Sarawak.
