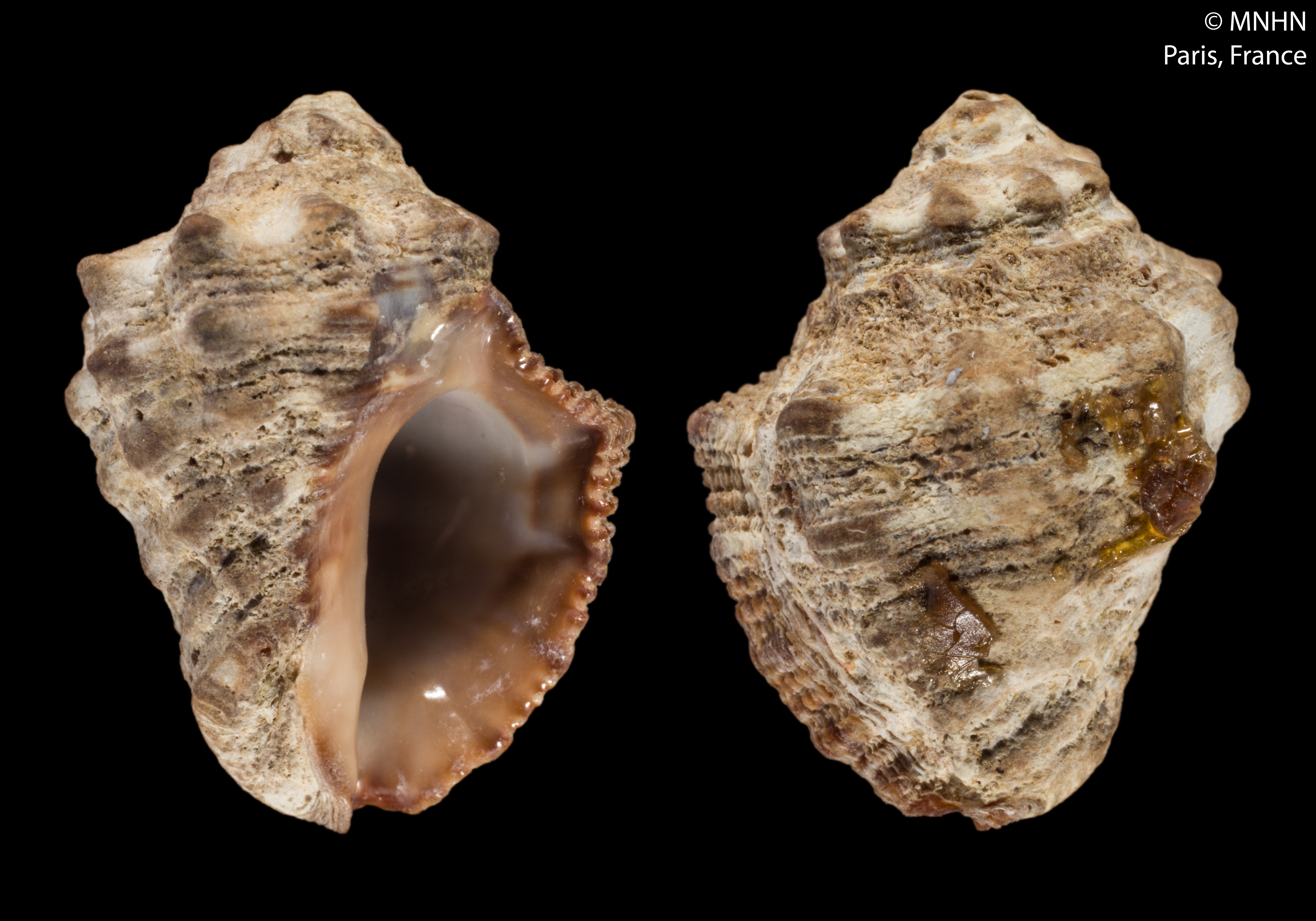
- Shell of Semiricinula turbinoides (syntype at MNHN, Paris)

Scientific classification
- Kingdom: Animalia
- Phylum: Mollusca
- Class: Gastropoda
- Subclass: Caenogastropoda
- Order: Neogastropoda
- Family: Muricidae
- Genus: Semiricinula
- Species: S. turbinoides

Binomial name
- Semiricinula turbinoides (Blainville, 1832)

Synonyms
- Drupa foliacea (Conrad, 1837); Morula brunneolabrum Dall, 1923; Purpura foliacea Conrad, 1837; Purpura turbinoides Blainville, 1832

= Semiricinula turbinoides =

Species of gastropod

Semiricinula turbinoides is a species of sea snail, a marine gastropod mollusk in the family Muricidae, the murex snails or rock snails.

== Distribution ==
This marine species occurs off the Solomon Islands.
