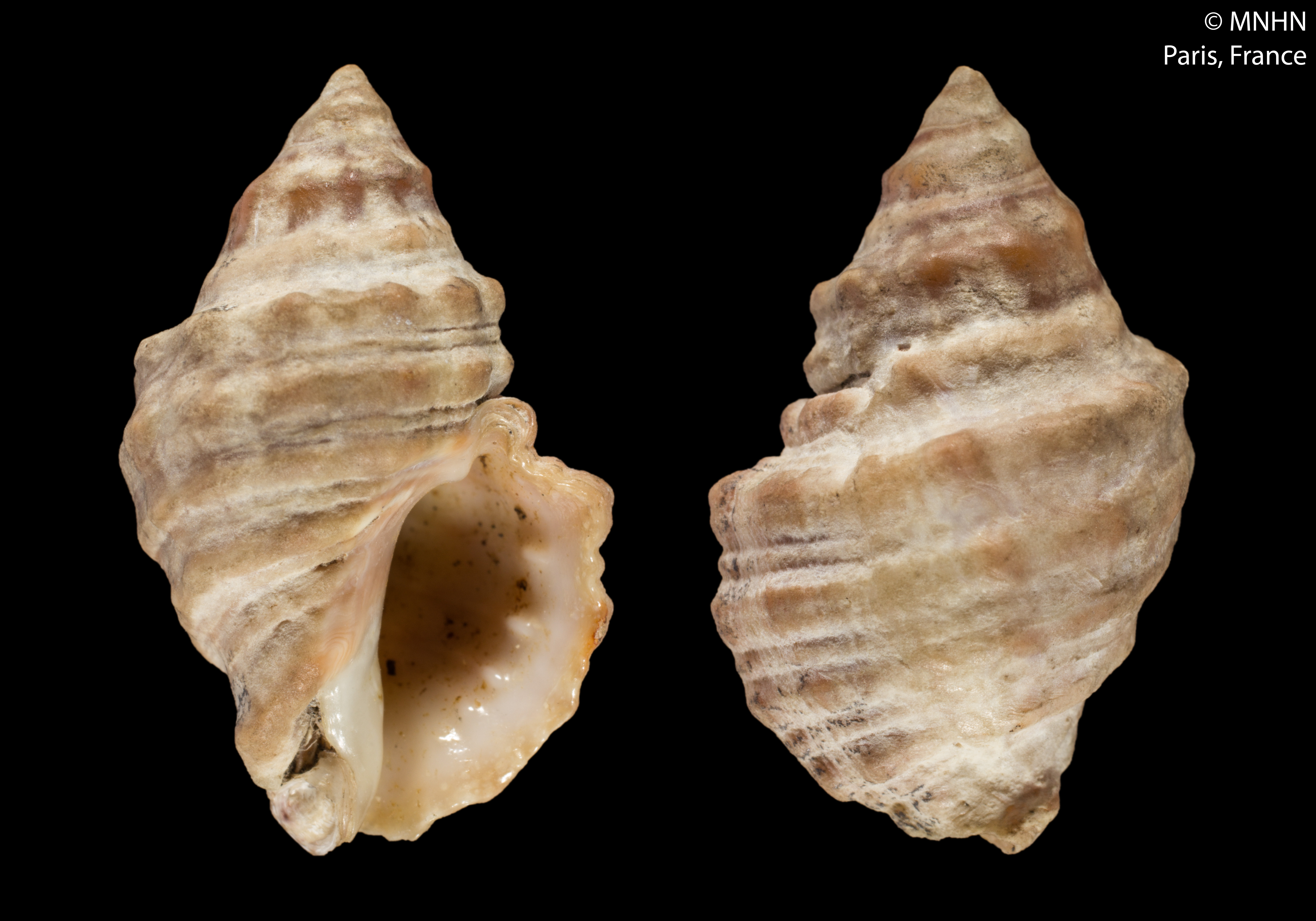
- Shell of Semiricinula tissoti (paralectotype at MNHN, Paris)

Scientific classification
- Kingdom: Animalia
- Phylum: Mollusca
- Class: Gastropoda
- Subclass: Caenogastropoda
- Order: Neogastropoda
- Family: Muricidae
- Subfamily: Rapaninae
- Genus: Semiricinula
- Species: S. tissoti

Binomial name
- Semiricinula tissoti (Petit de la Saussaye, 1852)

Synonyms
- Purpura tissoti Petit de la Saussaye, 1852; Thais (Thaisella) tissoti (Petit de la Saussaye, 1852); Thais tissoti (Petit de la Saussaye, 1852); Thaisella tissoti (Petit de la Saussaye, 1852)

= Semiricinula tissoti =

Species of gastropod

Semiricinula tissoti is a species of sea snail, a marine gastropod mollusk, in the family Muricidae, the murex snails or rock snails.

== Description ==
The length of the shell attains 18.5 mm.

== Distribution ==
This marine species occurs off Mumbai, India.
