= Semiricinula fusca =

Scientific classification
- Kingdom: Animalia
- Phylum: Mollusca
- Class: Gastropoda
- Subclass: Caenogastropoda
- Order: Neogastropoda
- Family: Muricidae
- Genus: Semiricinula
- Species: S. fusca

Binomial name
- Semiricinula fusca Küster, 1862

Synonyms
- Ricinula fusca Küster, 1862

Species of gastropod

Semiricinula fusca is a species of sea snail, a marine gastropod mollusk in the family Muricidae, the murex snails or rock snails.
