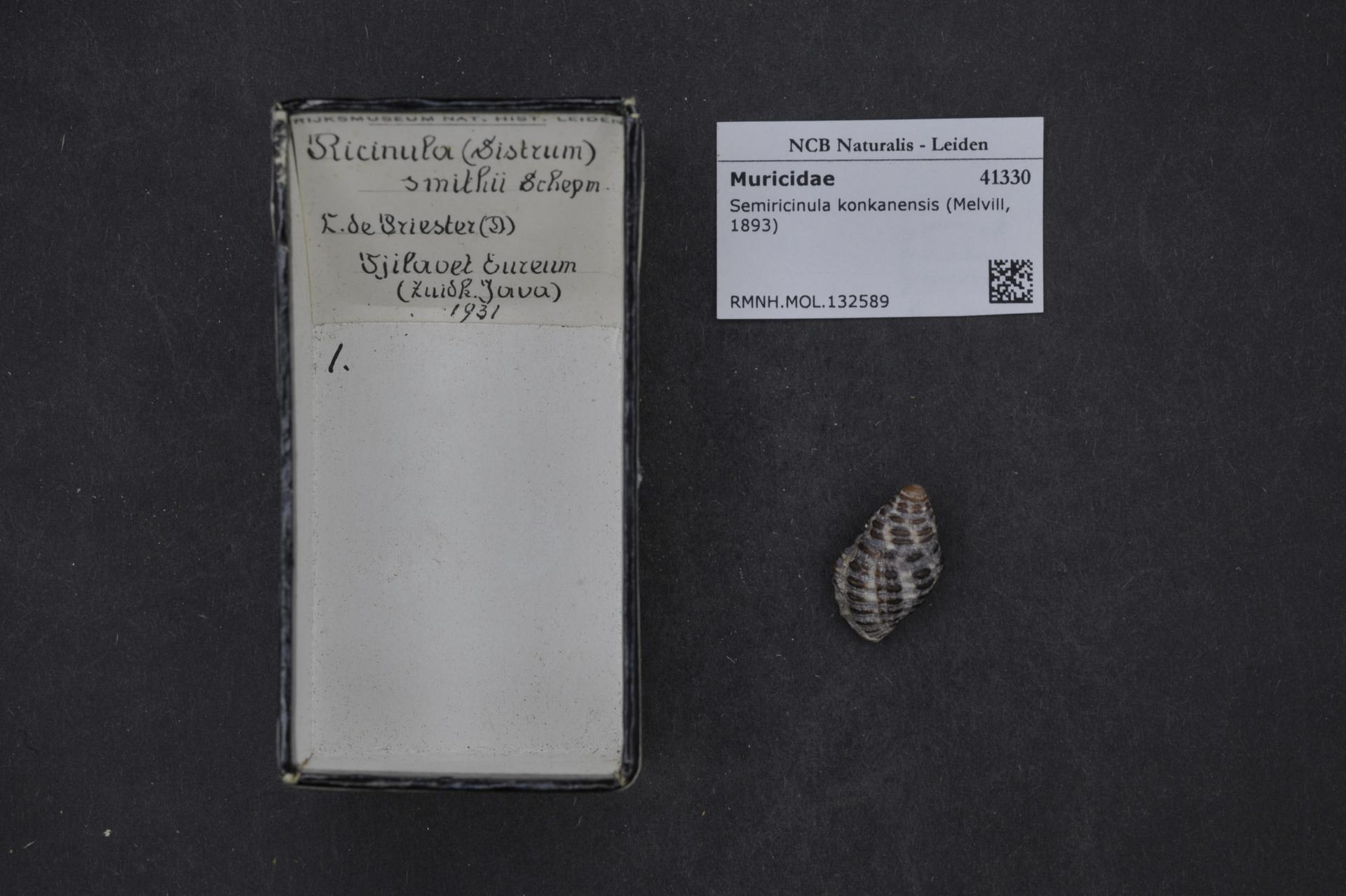
- Semiricinula konkanensi

Scientific classification
- Kingdom: Animalia
- Phylum: Mollusca
- Class: Gastropoda
- Subclass: Caenogastropoda
- Order: Neogastropoda
- Family: Muricidae
- Genus: Semiricinula
- Species: S. konkanensis

Binomial name
- Semiricinula konkanensis (Melvill, 1893)

Synonyms
- Cronia konkanensis (Melvill, 1893); Pentadactylus (Morula) smithi Schepman, 1893; Ricinula (Sistrum) konkanensis Melvill, 1893

= Semiricinula konkanensis =

Species of gastropod

Semiricinula konkanensis is a species of sea snail, a marine gastropod mollusk in the family Muricidae, the murex snails or rock snails.
