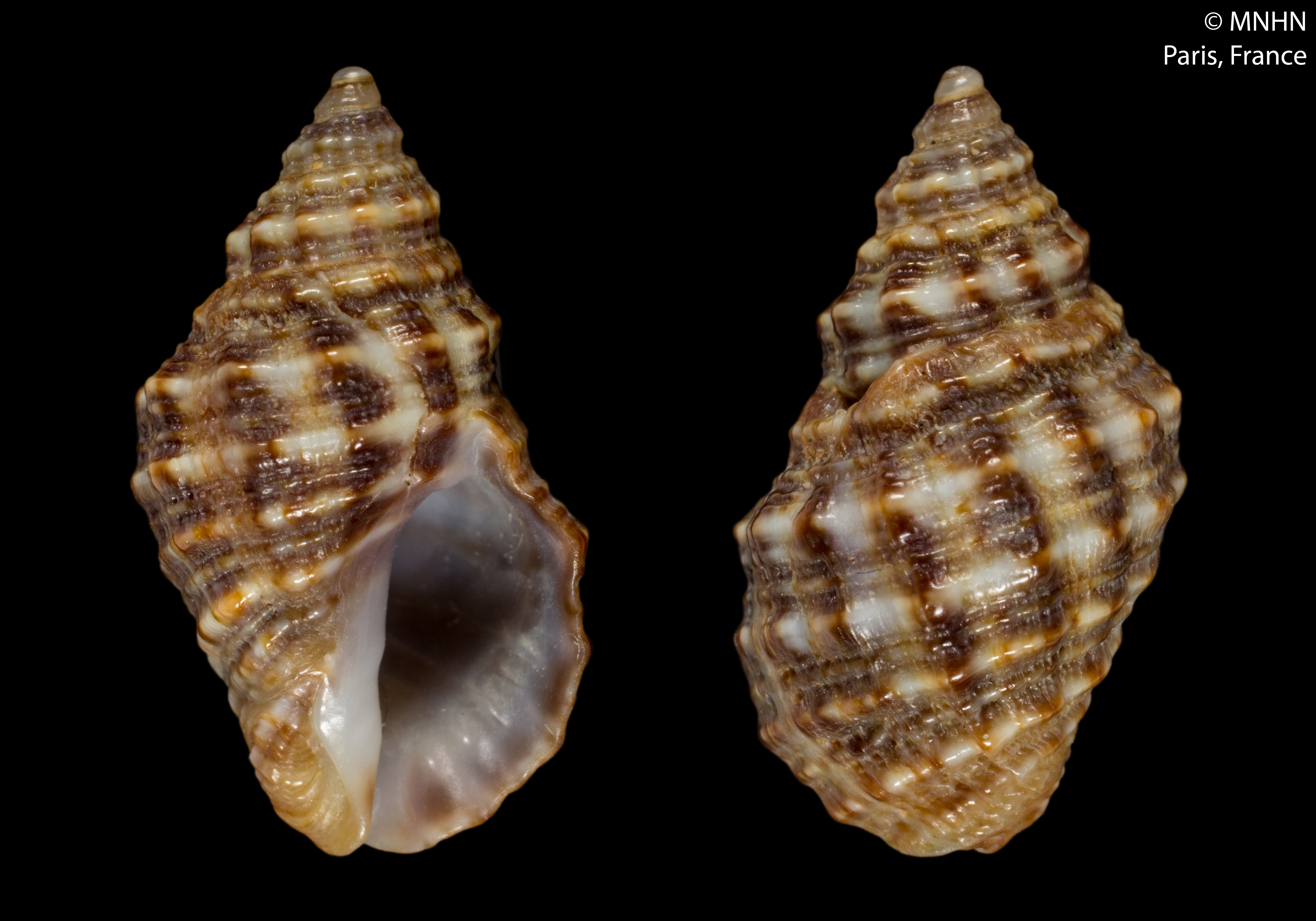
- Shell of Semiricinula tongasoa (holotype at MNHN, Paris)

Scientific classification
- Kingdom: Animalia
- Phylum: Mollusca
- Class: Gastropoda
- Subclass: Caenogastropoda
- Order: Neogastropoda
- Family: Muricidae
- Subfamily: Rapaninae
- Genus: Semiricinula
- Species: S. tongasoa

Binomial name
- Semiricinula tongasoa Bozzetti, 2018

= Semiricinula tongasoa =

Species of gastropod

Semiricinula tongasoa is a species of sea snail, a marine gastropod mollusk, in the family Muricidae, the murex snails or rock snails.

== Description ==
The length of the shell attains 14.4 mm.

== Distribution ==
This species occurs in Madagascar.
