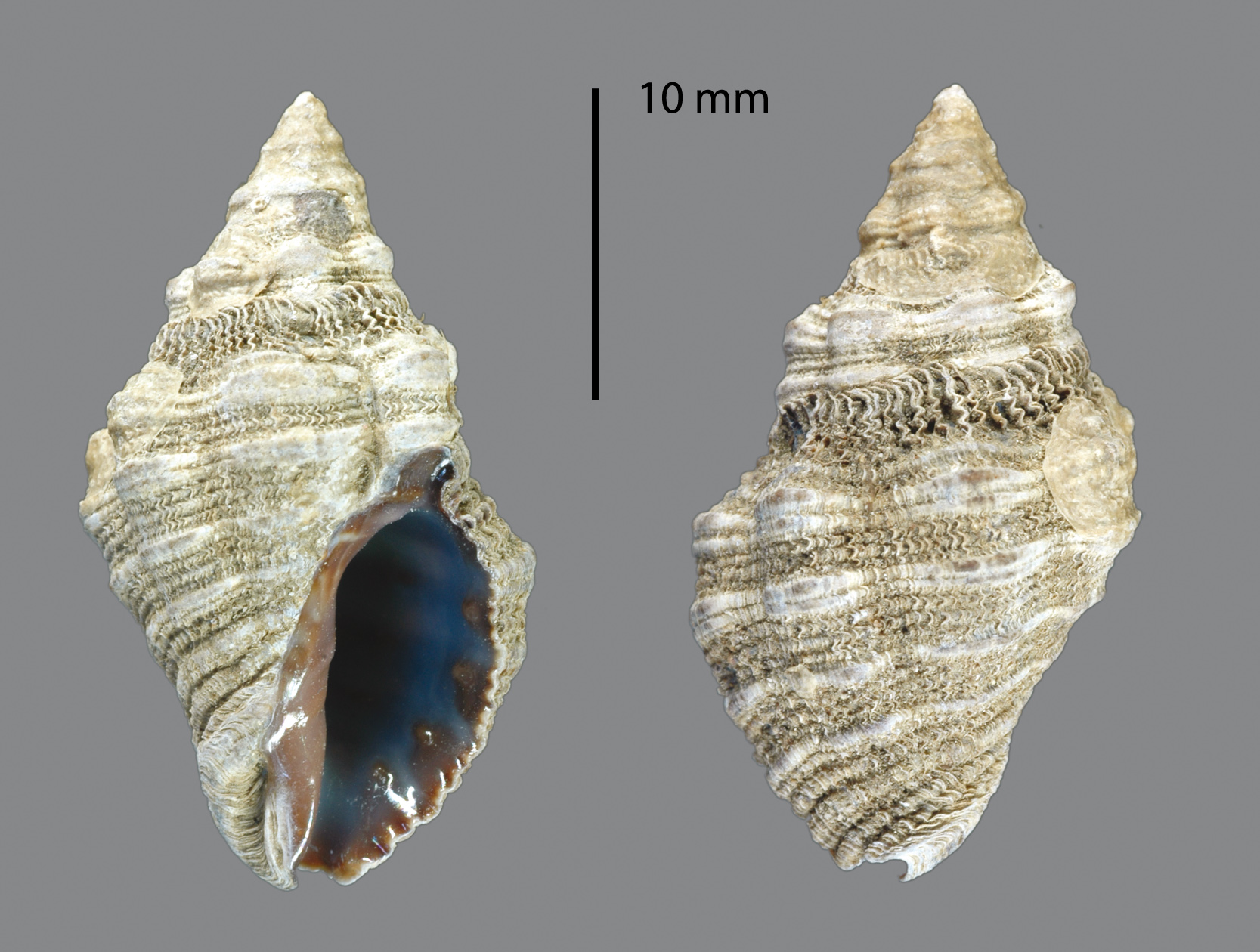

Scientific classification
- Kingdom: Animalia
- Phylum: Mollusca
- Class: Gastropoda
- Subclass: Caenogastropoda
- Order: Neogastropoda
- Family: Muricidae
- Genus: Semiricinula
- Species: S. muricoides

Binomial name
- Semiricinula muricoides (Blainville, 1832)

Synonyms
- Morula borneensis Dall, 1923 ·; Purpura muricoides Blainville, 1832; Thais muricoides (Blainville, 1832)

= Semiricinula muricoides =

Species of gastropod

Semiricinula muricoides is a species of sea snail, a marine gastropod mollusk in the family Muricidae, the murex snails or rock snails.

== Distribution ==
This marine species occurs off New Zealand.
