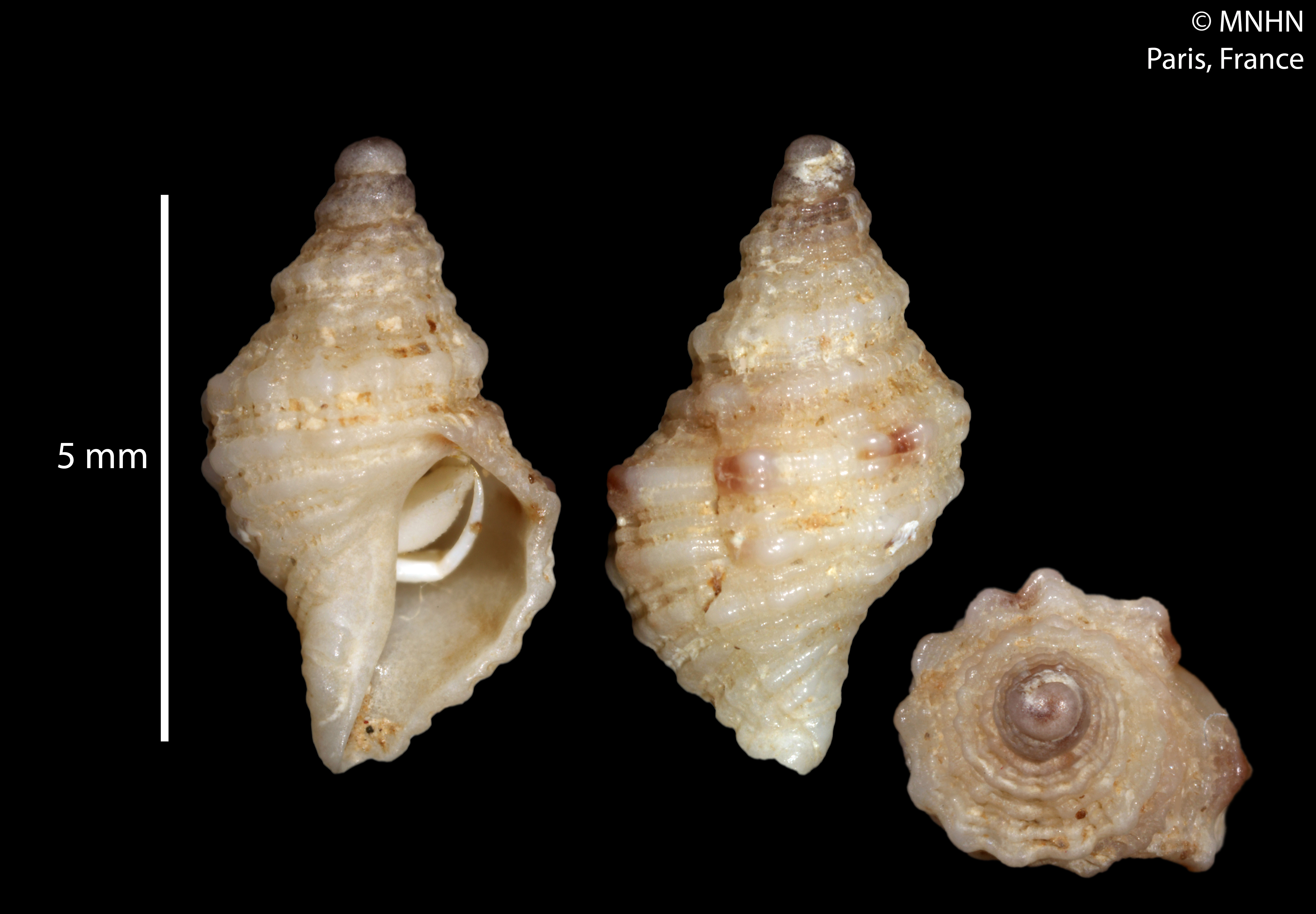
- Shell of Semiricinula bozzettii (specimen at MNHN, Paris)

Scientific classification
- Kingdom: Animalia
- Phylum: Mollusca
- Class: Gastropoda
- Subclass: Caenogastropoda
- Order: Neogastropoda
- Family: Muricidae
- Subfamily: Rapaninae
- Genus: Semiricinula
- Species: S. bozzettii

Binomial name
- Semiricinula bozzettii Houart & Héros, 2013

= Semiricinula bozzettii =

Species of gastropod

Semiricinula bozzettii is a macrobenthic predatory species of sea snail, a marine gastropod mollusk, in the family Muricidae, the murex snails or rock snails.

== Description ==
The length of the shell attains 17.4 mm.

== Distribution ==
This marine species occurs off Madagascar.
