= Semiricinula hadrolineae =

Scientific classification
- Kingdom: Animalia
- Phylum: Mollusca
- Class: Gastropoda
- Subclass: Caenogastropoda
- Order: Neogastropoda
- Family: Muricidae
- Genus: Semiricinula
- Species: S. hadrolineae

Binomial name
- Semiricinula hadrolineae (Houart, 1996)

Synonyms
- Thais (Semiricinula) hadrolineae Houart, 1996

Species of gastropod

Semiricinula hadrolineae is a species of sea snail, a marine gastropod mollusk in the family Muricidae, the murex snails or rock snails.
