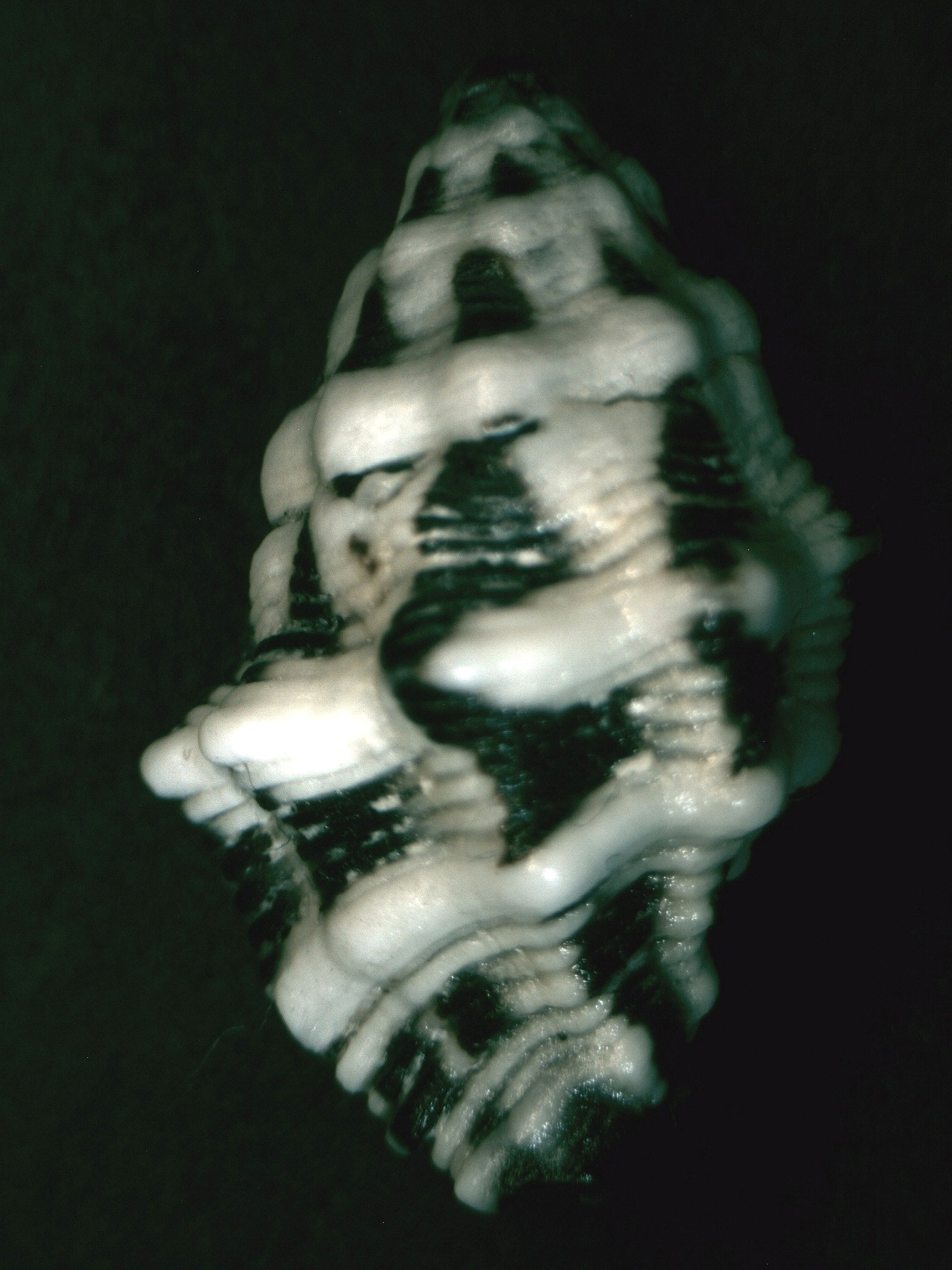
- A dorsal view of a shell of Morula striata

Scientific classification
- Kingdom: Animalia
- Phylum: Mollusca
- Class: Gastropoda
- Subclass: Caenogastropoda
- Order: Neogastropoda
- Family: Muricidae
- Subfamily: Ergalataxinae
- Genus: Morula; Schumacher, 1817

Type species
- Morula papillosa Schumacher, 1817

Synonyms
- Drupa (Morula) Schumacher, 1817; Habromorula Houart, 1995 (original rank); Morula (Habromorula) Houart, 1995· accepted, alternate representation; Morula (Morula) Schumacher, 1817· accepted, alternate representation; Pentadactylus (Morula) Schumacher, 1817

= Morula (gastropod) =

Genus of gastropods

Morula is a genus of small, predatory sea snails, marine gastropod molluscs in the subfalily Ergalataxinae of the family Muricidae, the murex snails or rock snails.

== Species ==
Species within the genus Morula include:

- Morula aglaos (Houart, 1995)
- Morula albanigra (Houart, 2002)
- Morula ambrosia (Houart, 1995)
- Morula angulata (G.B. Sowerby III, 1894)
- Morula aspera (Lamarck, 1816)
- Morula bicatenata (Reeve, 1846)
- Morula biconica (Blainville, 1832)
- Morula cernohorskyi (Houart & Tröndle, 1997)
- Morula chrysostoma (Deshayes, 1844)
- Morula coronata (H. Adams, 1869)
- Morula dichrous (Tapparone-Canefri, 1880)
- Morula echinata (Reeve, 1846)
- Morula euryspira (Houart, 1995)
- Morula fuscoimbricata (G.B. Sowerby III, 1915)
- Morula iostoma (Reeve, 1846)
- Morula japonica (G.B. Sowerby III, 1903)
- Morula lepida (Houart, 1995)
- Morula nodicostata (Pease, 1868)
- Morula oparensis (Melvill, 1912)
- Morula peasei (Houart, 2002)
- Morula porphyrostoma (Reeve, 1846)
- Morula praecipua (Rehder, 1980)
- Morula rodgersi (Houart, 2000)
- Morula spinosa (H. Adams & A. Adams, 1853)
- Morula striata (Pease, 1868)
- Morula uva (Röding, 1798)
- Morula variabilis (Pease, 1868)
- Morula whiteheadae (Houart, 2004)
- Morula zebrina (Houart, 2004)

Species brought into synonymy

- Morula (Azumamorula) mutica (Lamarck, 1816): synonym of Azumamorula mutica (Lamarck, 1816)
- Morula anaxares (Kiener, 1835): synonym of Muricodrupa anaxares (Kiener, 1836)
- Morula cancellata Quoy & Gaimard: synonym of Muricodrupa fenestrata (Blainville, 1832)
- Morula concatenata (Lamarck, 1822): synonym of Drupella rugosa (Born, 1778)
- Morula consanguinea (Smith, 1890): synonym of Claremontiella consanguinea (E. A. Smith, 1890)
- Morula elata Blainville: synonym of Drupella cornus (Röding, 1798)
- Morula fenestrata Blainville, 1832: synonym of Muricodrupa fenestrata (Blainville, 1832)
- Morula funiculata (Reeve, 1846): synonym of Oppomorus funiculatus (Reeve, 1846)
- Morula granulata (Duclos, 1832): synonym of Tenguella granulata (Duclos, 1832)
- Morula margariticola (Broderip): synonym of Ergalatax margariticola (Broderip, in Broderip & Sowerby, 1833)
- Morula marginalba (Blainville, 1832): synonym of Tenguella marginalba (Blainville, 1832)
- Morula marginatra Blainville, 1832: synonym of Semiricinula marginatra (Blainville, 1832)
- Morula musiva (Kiener, 1835): synonym of Tenguella musiva (Kiener, 1835)
- Morula nodulifera: synonym of Oppomorus noduliferus (Menke, 1829)
- Morula nodulosa (C.B. Adams, 1845): synonym of Claremontiella nodulosa (C. B. Adams, 1845)
- Morula ocellata: synonym of Ergalatax contracta (Reeve, 1846)
- Morula oparense (Melvill, 1912): synonym of Morula oparensis (Melvill, 1912)
- Morula palmeri Powell, 1967: synonym of Pascula palmeri (Powell, 1967) (original combination)
- Morula parva (Reeve, 1846): synonym of Lauta parva (Reeve, 1846)
- Morula purpureocincta (Preston, 1909): synonym of Oppomorus purpureocinctus (Preston, 1909)
- Morula rosea (Reeve, 1846): synonym of Muricopsis (Risomurex) roseus (Reeve, 1846)
- Morula rumphiusi Houart, 1996: synonym of Murichorda rumphiusi (Houart, 1996)
- Morula squamiliratum Smith: synonym of Orania serotina (A. Adams, 1853)
- Morula squamosa Pease: synonym of Semiricinula squamosa (Pease, 1868)
- Morula tuberculata Blainville: synonym of Morula (Morula) granulata (Duclos, 1832)

== Taxonomy ==
In 2002, Roland Houart described two new species and revised eight others, for a total 23 species of Morula sensu stricto. He had previously (1994–1995) described Habromorula as a separate genus, containing 14 species that were earlier classified with Spinidrupa sensu lato. In 2004, he placed Azumamorula, Oppomorus, and Habromorula into Morula as subgenera, and moved the whole group from subfamily Rapaninae to Ergalataxinae.

=== Molecular genetics ===
In 2012–2013, Claremont et al. published a study of sequences for four genes across numerous species of Morula and related molluscs. They found a clade of 11 species, and proposed a restricted definition of Morula to include: M. aspera, M. benedicta, M. (Habromorula) biconica, M. chrysostoma, M. (H.) coronata, M. (H.) japonica, M. nodicostata, M. (H.) spinosa, M. (H.) striata, M. uva (type species), and M. zebrina.

Habromorula did not form a clade in this analysis, however the authors noted that "monophyly of this morphologically distinctive group is not strongly contradicted, so that further sampling and analysis could yet support Habromorula as a monophyletic subgenus of Morula".

Subgenus Morula (Oppomorus) formed a separate clade; the authors proposed returning Oppomorus to genus level, containing O. nodulifera, O. funiculata and O. purpureocincta.

Morulaceylonica, M. granulata, M. marginalba, M. musiva, and an undescribed species formed a distinct clade related to Muricodrupa. The authors proposed resurrecting the genus name Tenguella, for which T. granulata is the type species. They note that these species "have not previously been recognized as a morphologically distinctive group".

"Morula" anaxares was weakly related to Muricodrupa fenestrata, and "Morula" nodulosa was sister to the Tenguella–Muricodrupa group. "Morula" parva and "Morula" echinata placed in a third major clade, separate from the two that contain Tenguella and the main Morula group, respectively.

In response to the gene-sequence phylogeny, Houart, Zuccon and Puillandre formally described new genera in 2019: Claremontiella, Murichorda, and Lauta. C. nodulosa, C. consanguinea, Mur. rumphiusi, and L. parva were previously in Morula. They also moved Morula anaxares to Muricodrupa anaxares, and reassigned M. palmeri to Pascula, the latter on basis of morphology rather than gene sequence.
