= Azumamorula =

Scientific classification
- Kingdom: Animalia
- Phylum: Mollusca
- Class: Gastropoda
- Subclass: Caenogastropoda
- Order: Neogastropoda
- Family: Muricidae
- Subfamily: Ergalataxinae
- Genus: Azumamorula; Emerson, 1968
- Species: A. mutica

Binomial name
- Azumamorula mutica (Lamarck, 1816)

Synonyms
- Drupa mutica (Lamarck, 1816); Morula (Azumamorula) mutica (Lamarck, 1816); Ricinula mutica Lamarck, 1816 (basionym); Ricinula pisolina Lamarck, 1822

Genus of gastropods

Azumamorula mutica, the smooth ricinula, is a species of sea snail, a marine gastropod mollusc in the family Muricidae, the murex snails or rock snails. It is the only species in genus Azumamorula.

== Description ==
The shell size varies between 15 mm and 20 mm.

== Distribution ==
This species is distributed in the Indian Ocean along Madagascar, the Mascarene basin, Réunion, and along Eastern Australia.

== Taxonomy ==
This species was originally named Ricinula mutica by Lamarck in 1816, grouping it with species that are now mostly in Drupa and Morula. (Note: R. horrida (D. morum Röding 1798), R. arachnoides (Murex ricinus Linnaeus, now D. ricinus), R. aspera (Mor. aspera), R. clathrata (D. clathrata), R. nodus (D. uva Röding 1798, Mor. uva), and R. digitata (Drupa grossularia Röding 1798, Drupina grossularia)) In 1823, Dall defined two new genera, Drupina and Morulina, to hold species of Drupa and Morula having simple non-plaited columnellae. He chose R. mutica as the type species for Morulina. (Note: Along with Morulina mutica, Dall lists triangulata, fiscellum (Murichorda fiscellum, Muricodrupa fiscellum), ocellata (Ergalatax contracta), ambusta (Morula spinosa), musiva (Tenguella musiva), ochrostoma (Pascula ochrostoma), polyphrostoma, dumosa (Purpura dumosa), fuscoimbricata, fenestrata (Muricodrupa fenestrata), and elata (Drupella cornus))

Thiele in 1931 and Wenz in 1941 had placed Morulina into Drupa. In 1968, Emerson found that the teeth on the radula of D. mutica had an unusual shape. As a result, he desired to split it out to its own genus, but the name Morulina was already taken as a genus of arthropod. Thus he introduced a new name Azumamorula, recognising Masao Azuma who had extracted the radula specimen.

In 2004, Houart placed Azumamorula and Oppomorus as subgenera of Morula, and moved Morula from subfamily Rapaninae to Ergalataxinae. However, in 2013, a phylogenetic study of the sequences for four genes indicated that Morula (Morula) sensu stricto was polyphyletic, and Morula (Oppomorus) was a separate clade. The relevant genes from A. mutica haven't been sequenced, but it's unlikely to be part of a more-restricted Morula–Habromorula group. As of 2020, Houart lists Azumamorula as a separate genus and Molluscabase classes the combination Azumamorula mutica as "accepted".
