= Morula palmeri =

Scientific classification
- Kingdom: Animalia
- Phylum: Mollusca
- Class: Gastropoda
- Subclass: Caenogastropoda
- Order: Neogastropoda
- Superfamily: Muricoidea
- Family: Muricidae
- Subfamily: Ergalataxinae
- Genus: Morula
- Species: M. palmeri

Binomial name
- Morula palmeri Powell, 1967

Synonyms
- Pascula palmeri (Powell, 1967)

Species of gastropod

Morula palmeri is a species of sea snail, a marine gastropod mollusk, in the family Muricidae, the murex snails or rock snails.

The species was described by Powell in 1967 as Morula palmeri. Houart et al. (2019) proposed the name Pascula palmeri comb. nov., as the species' morphology is similar to Pascula citrica but not to Morula uva, the respective type species of the genera.

== Distribution ==
This species occurs in New Zealand Exclusive Economic Zone.
