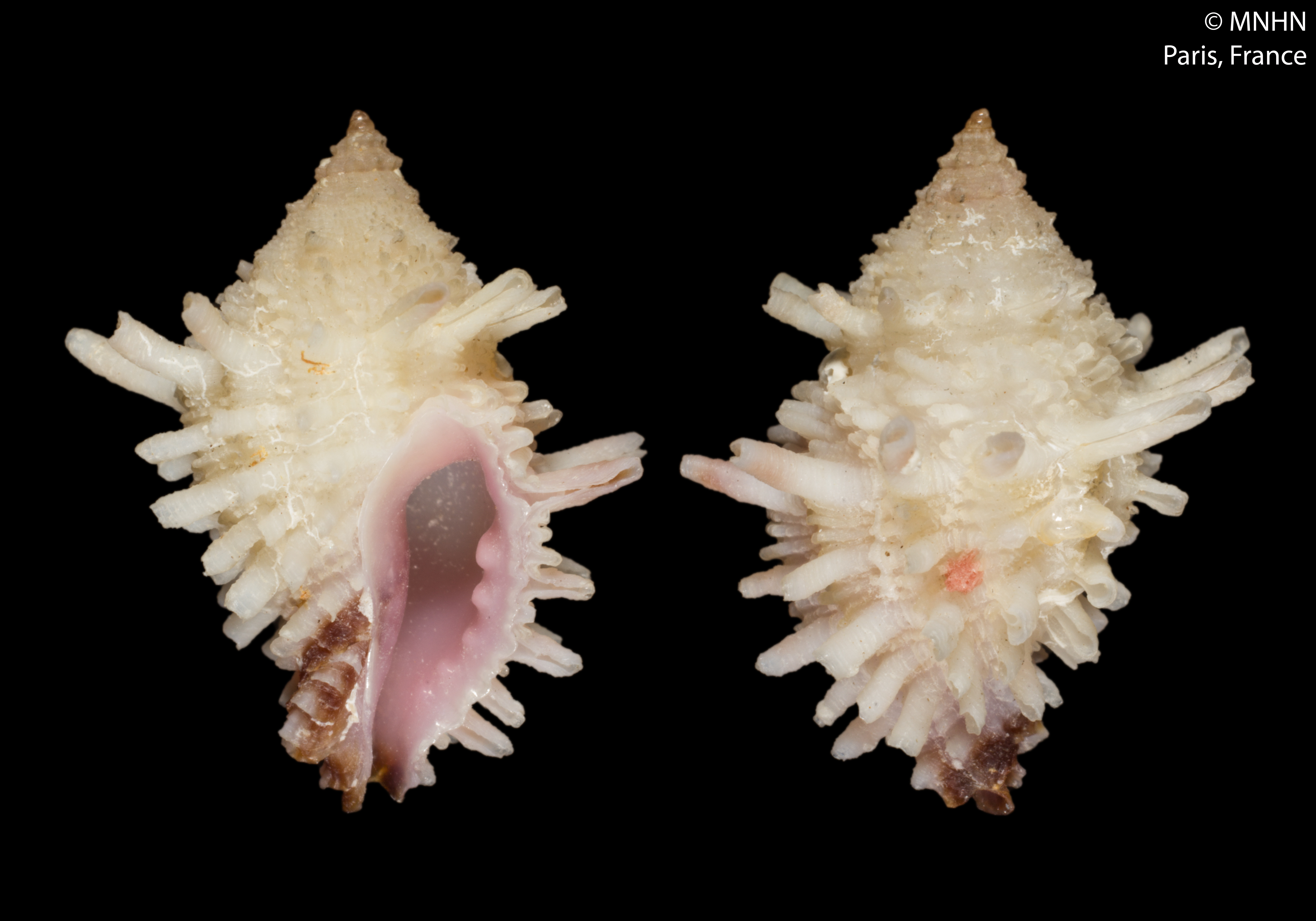

Scientific classification
- Kingdom: Animalia
- Phylum: Mollusca
- Class: Gastropoda
- Subclass: Caenogastropoda
- Order: Neogastropoda
- Family: Muricidae
- Genus: Morula
- Subgenus: Habromorula
- Species: M. aglaos

Binomial name
- Morula aglaos (Houart, 1995)

Synonyms
- Habromorula aglaos Houart, 1995; Morula (Habromorula) aglaos (Houart, 1995)

= Morula aglaos =

Species of gastropod

Morula aglaos is a species of sea snail, a marine gastropod mollusc in the family Muricidae, the murex snails or rock snails. This species is only known from Kwajalein Atoll in the Marshall Islands.

== Taxonomy ==
Morula aglaos was first formally described as Habromorula aglaos in 1995 by the Belgian malacologist Roland Houart with its type locality given as Kwajalein Atoll in the Marshall Islands. Houart included this species in the new genus Habromorula which he described in the same paper, designating Purpua biconica Blainville, 1832 as its type species. In 2004 Houart published a review of the genera Oppomorus, Azumamorula and Habromorula and synonymised them with Morula, as well as transferring the genus Morula from the subfamily Rapaninae to the subfamily Ergalataxinae within the family Muricidae, the rock snails or murex snails. However, in 2013, a phylogenetic study of the sequences for four genes indicated that Morula (Morula) sensu stricto was polyphyletic, and Morula (Oppomorus) was a separate clade, and that Azumamorula should be treated as a separate genus too.

== Etymology ==
Morula aglaos belongs to the genus Morula, a name which means "little mulberry", was proposed in 1817 by the Danish biologist Heinrich Christian Friedrich Schumacher. This is also the name of an embryological stage but Schumacher's usage predates it use in embryology attributed to Ernst Haeckel in 1872. The specific name aglaos is Greek and means "splendid" or "beautiful".

== Description ==
Morula aglaos may be told apart from other snails in the subgenus Habromorula by its relatively small size, in having more whorls on the adult shell with the spines beong longer when compared to the width of the shel and greater in number. The shell is ivory colored with a brown siphonal canal and a pinkish aperture. The length of the shell on the holotype was 14.2 mm (0.56 in).

== Distribution and habitat ==
Morula aglaos is known from its type locality of Kwajalein Atoll, in the Marshall Islands, where it is found beneath rocks and in ledges and caves in the reefs in the lagoon and pinnacles, and may also occur on the outer reef of the atoll.
