= Morula iostoma =

Scientific classification
- Kingdom: Animalia
- Phylum: Mollusca
- Class: Gastropoda
- Subclass: Caenogastropoda
- Order: Neogastropoda
- Superfamily: Muricoidea
- Family: Muricidae
- Subfamily: Ergalataxinae
- Genus: Morula
- Species: M. iostoma

Binomial name
- Morula iostoma (Reeve, 1846)

Synonyms
- Ricinula iostoma Reeve, 1846

Species of gastropod

Morula iostoma is a species of sea snail, a marine gastropod mollusk, in the family Muricidae, the murex snails or rock snails.
