= Morula oparensis =

Scientific classification
- Kingdom: Animalia
- Phylum: Mollusca
- Class: Gastropoda
- Subclass: Caenogastropoda
- Order: Neogastropoda
- Superfamily: Muricoidea
- Family: Muricidae
- Subfamily: Ergalataxinae
- Genus: Morula
- Species: M. oparensis

Binomial name
- Morula oparensis (Melvill, 1912)

Synonyms
- Morula (Morula) oparensis (Melvill, 1912); Sistrum oparense Melvill, 1912

Species of gastropod

Morula oparensis is a species of sea snail, a marine gastropod mollusk, in the family Muricidae, the murex snails or rock snails.
