= Lauta (disambiguation) =

Lauta may refer to the following places in Saxony, Germany

- Lauta, a town in the district of Bautzen
- Lauta (Marienberg), a village in the borough of Marienberg
- Verwaltungsgemeinschaft Lauta, a former Verwaltungsgemeinschaft
- Lauta, genus of sea snail.
