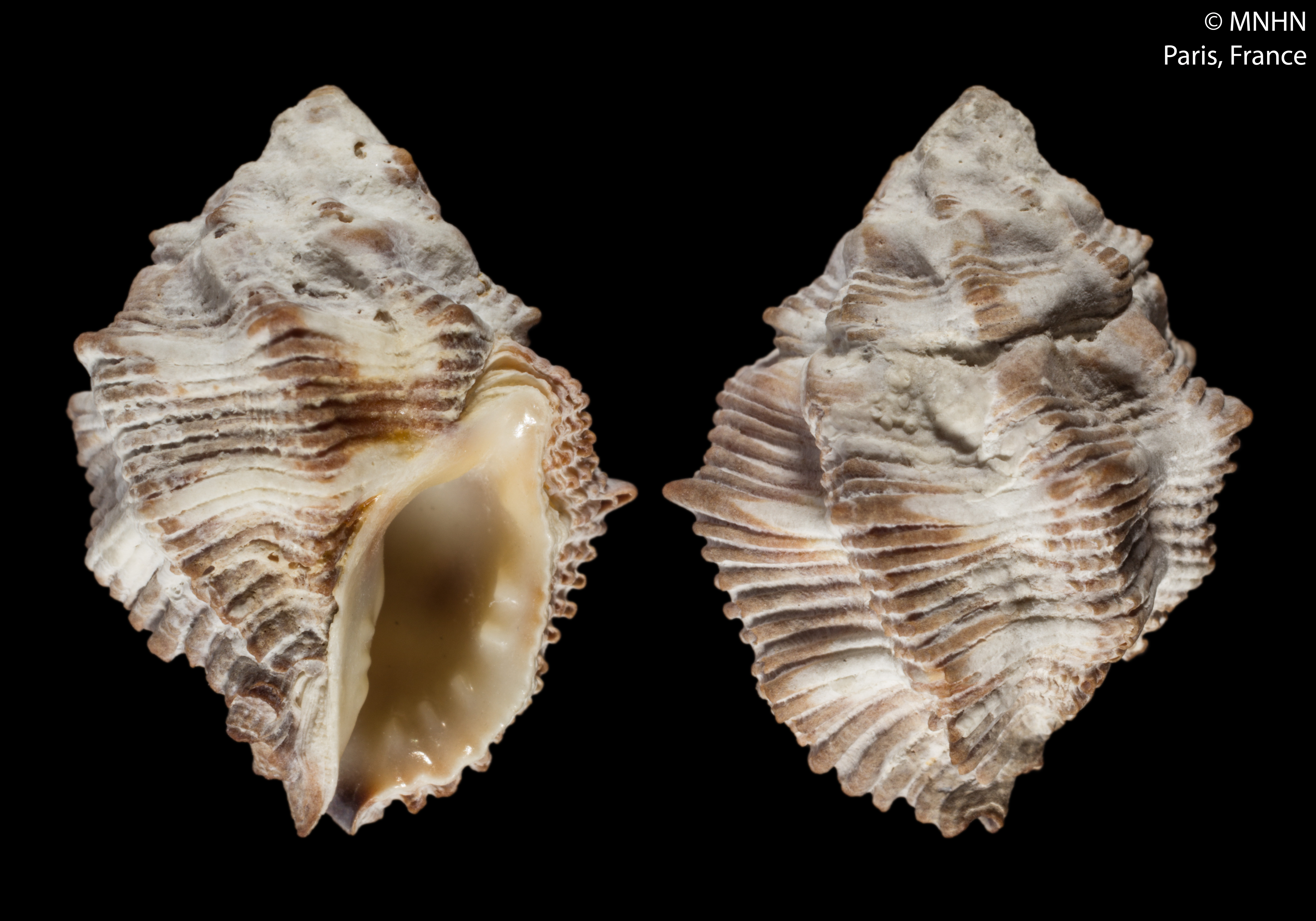
- Shell of Morula chrysostoma (syntype at MNHN, Paris)

Scientific classification
- Kingdom: Animalia
- Phylum: Mollusca
- Class: Gastropoda
- Subclass: Caenogastropoda
- Order: Neogastropoda
- Family: Muricidae
- Subfamily: Ergalataxinae
- Genus: Morula
- Species: M. chrysostoma

Binomial name
- Morula chrysostoma (Deshayes, 1844)

Synonyms
- Drupa chrysostoma (Deshayes, 1844); Morula (Morula) chrysostoma (Deshayes, 1844); Morulina chrysostoma (Deshayes, 1844); Purpura chrysostoma Deshayes, 1844 (basionym); Ricinula chrysostoma (Deshayes, 1844); Semiricinula chrysostoma (Deshayes, 1844)

= Morula chrysostoma =

Species of gastropod

Morula chrysostoma is a species of sea snail, a marine gastropod mollusc in the family Muricidae, the murex snails or rock snails. The shell size varies between 15 mm and 20 mm. This species is distributed in the Red Sea, along Aden and in the Indian Ocean along Madagascar.
