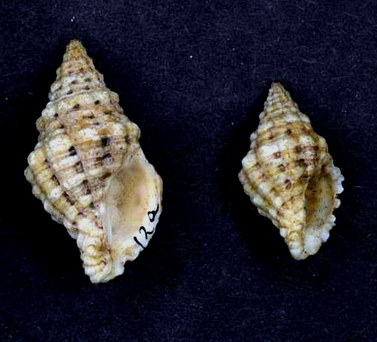
- Muricodrupa fenestrata. Image donated by Naturalis Biodiversity Center, from a specimen in the Rijksmuseum collection, Leiden.

Scientific classification
- Kingdom: Animalia
- Phylum: Mollusca
- Class: Gastropoda
- Subclass: Caenogastropoda
- Order: Neogastropoda
- Superfamily: Muricoidea
- Family: Muricidae
- Subfamily: Ergalataxinae
- Genus: Muricodrupa; Iredale, 1918

Type species
- Purpura fenestrata Blainville, 1832

= Muricodrupa =

Genus of gastropods

Muricodrupa is a genus of sea snails, marine gastropod mollusks in the subfamily Ergalataxinae of the family Muricidae, the murex snails or rock snails.

== Species ==
- Muricodrupa anaxares (Kiener, 1836) (previously Morula anaxares)
- Muricodrupa fenestrata (Blainville, 1832)

According to the World Register of Marine Species (WoRMS) before 2019, the following species were included within the genus Muricodrupa :

- Muricodrupa fiscellum (Gmelin, 1791), now Murichorda fiscellum (Gmelin, 1791)
- Muricodrupa jacobsoni Emerson & D'Attilio, 1981, now Murichorda jacobsoni (Emerson & D'Attilio, 1981) (original combination)

The Indo-Pacific Molluscan Database (2006) also includes the following names in current use

- Muricodrupa fusca (Küster, 1868 in 1859-68): synonym of Semiricinula fusca (Küster, 1862)
- Muricodrupa pothuanii (Souleyet in Eydoux & Souleyet, 1852)
- Muricodrupa stellaris (Hombron & Jaquinot, 1854)

== Taxonomy ==
In 1918, Iredale noted that the shell then known as Ricinula (or Sistrum) cancellata Quoy and Gaimard 1833 was synonymous with the Purpura fenestrata of Blainville, 1832. He asserted that the species was distinct from Drupa and Morula, creating a new monotypic genus Muricodrupa.

By 2013, the genus had been expanded to several species. Claremont et al. found the type species Muricodrupa fenestrata was related to Morula anaxares, but not to other species that had been classified into Muricodrupa. As a result, in 2019 Houart et al. proposed renaming Morula anaxares to Muricodrupa anaxares, and removing M. fiscellum and M. jacobsoni to a new genus Murichorda. Muricodrupa as redefined is related to a group of former Morula species now called Tenguella.
