= Morula dichrous =

Scientific classification
- Kingdom: Animalia
- Phylum: Mollusca
- Class: Gastropoda
- Subclass: Caenogastropoda
- Order: Neogastropoda
- Family: Muricidae
- Genus: Morula
- Species: M. dichrous

Binomial name
- Morula dichrous (Tapparone-Canefri, 1880)

Synonyms
- Engina xantholeuca Sowerby III, 1882; Murex dichrous Tapparone-Canefri, 1880

Species of gastropod

Morula dichrous is a species of sea snail, a marine gastropod mollusk in the family Muricidae, the murex snails or rock snails.
