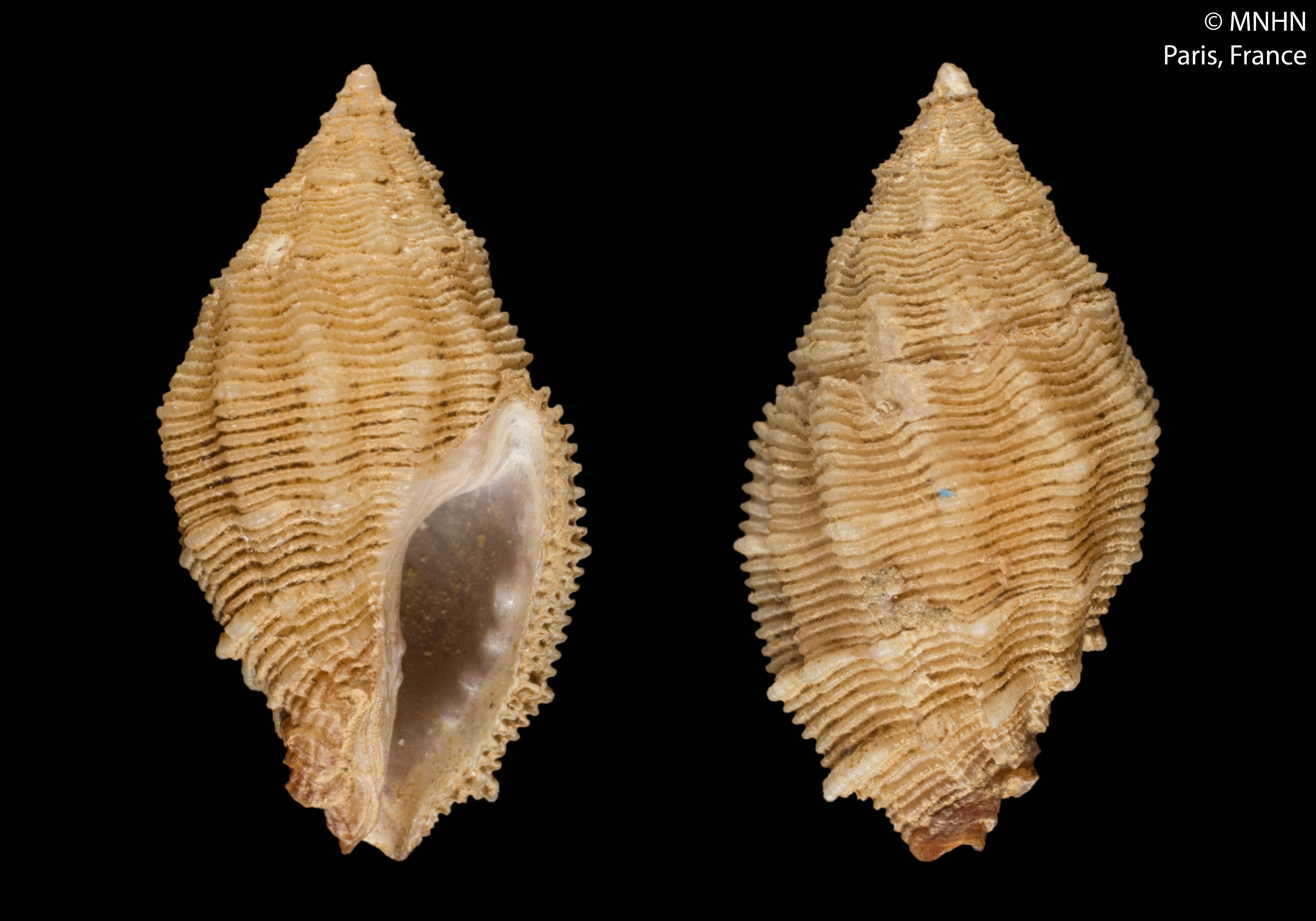

Scientific classification
- Kingdom: Animalia
- Phylum: Mollusca
- Class: Gastropoda
- Subclass: Caenogastropoda
- Order: Neogastropoda
- Family: Muricidae
- Genus: Morula
- Species: M. lepida

Binomial name
- Morula lepida (Houart, 1995)

Synonyms
- Habromorula lepida Houart, 1995; Morula (Habromorula) lepida (Houart, 1995)

= Morula lepida =

Species of gastropod

Morula lepida (from Latin lepida: elegant, fine) is a species of sea snail, a marine gastropod mollusk in the family Muricidae, the murex snails or rock snails.

== Description ==
The squamous shell is medium-sized for the genus, attaining a length of up to 15 mm at maturity. The spire sits high with 2.5+ partly broken protoconch whorls. The teleoconch has up to 6 elongated whorls and impressed sutures. The protoconch is smooth and conical.

The axial sculpture consists of moderately high, rounded ribs with about 8–9 on the first and fourth teleoconch whorls, 8 on the second and third whorls and 9–11 on the fifth and sixth whorls. The spiral sculpture consists of numerous, narrow, squamous cords of about the same size. The last teleoconch whorls has 26-28 such cords with 2 or 3 on its abapical part being slightly larger.

The aperture is ovate with a fully adherent columellar lip that is smooth apart from 2 or 3 small abapical nodules. The anal notch is shallow and broad. Furthermore, the outer lip is minutely crenulate with 5 nodules within. The siphonal canal is very short and open. The shell's colour can be described as creamy-white, light tan or light mauve, with the broader spiral cords on the abapical part of the last teleoconch whorl being paler. The aperture is (light) pink or a pinkish-violet.

At the time of the first description of the species (1995) the existence of an operculum and a radula were unknown.

== Distribution ==
This marine species occurs off New Caledonia, Loyalty Ridge, the Midway and Hawaiian Islands as well as Papua New Guinea.
