= Morula bicatenata =

Scientific classification
- Kingdom: Animalia
- Phylum: Mollusca
- Class: Gastropoda
- Subclass: Caenogastropoda
- Order: Neogastropoda
- Family: Muricidae
- Genus: Morula
- Species: M. bicatenata

Binomial name
- Morula bicatenata (Reeve, 1846)

Synonyms
- Morula (Habromorula) bicatenata (Reeve, 1846); Ricinula bicatenata Reeve, 1846

Species of gastropod

Morula bicatenata is a species of sea snail, a marine gastropod mollusk in the family Muricidae, the murex snails or rock snails.
