= Morula angulata =

Scientific classification
- Kingdom: Animalia
- Phylum: Mollusca
- Class: Gastropoda
- Subclass: Caenogastropoda
- Order: Neogastropoda
- Family: Muricidae
- Genus: Morula
- Species: M. angulata

Binomial name
- Morula angulata (G.B. Sowerby III, 1894)

Synonyms
- Sistrum angulatum G.B. Sowerby III, 1894

Species of gastropod

Morula angulata is a species of sea snail, a marine gastropod mollusk in the family Muricidae, the murex snails or rock snails.
