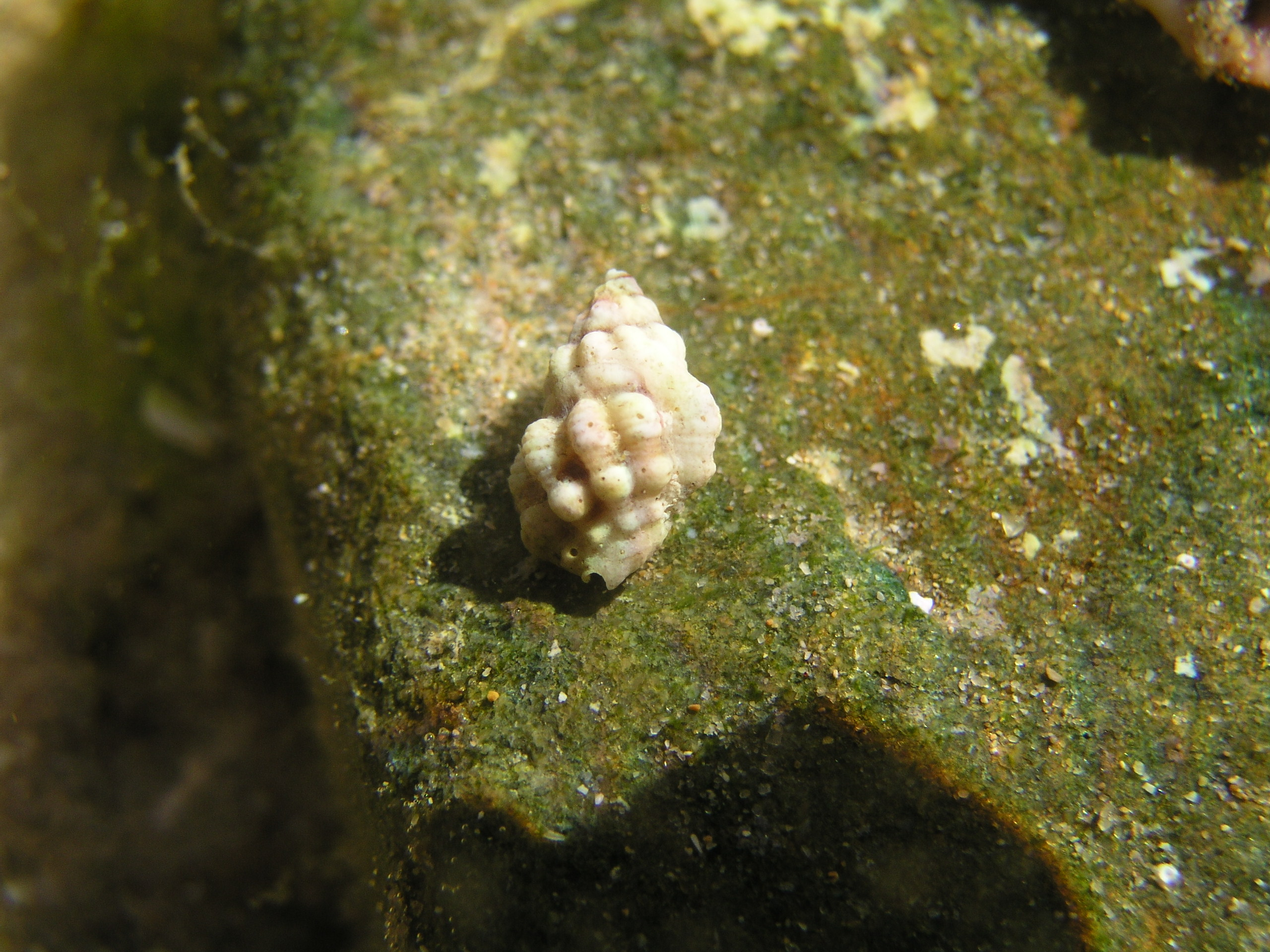

Scientific classification
- Kingdom: Animalia
- Phylum: Mollusca
- Class: Gastropoda
- Subclass: Caenogastropoda
- Order: Neogastropoda
- Family: Muricidae
- Genus: Morula
- Species: M. nodicostata

Binomial name
- Morula nodicostata (Pease, 1868)

Synonyms
- Engina nodicostata Pease, 1868; Morula parvissima Cernohorsky, 1987

= Morula nodicostata =

Species of gastropod

Morula nodicostata is a species of sea snail, a marine gastropod mollusk in the family Muricidae, the murex snails or rock snails.

== Gallery ==
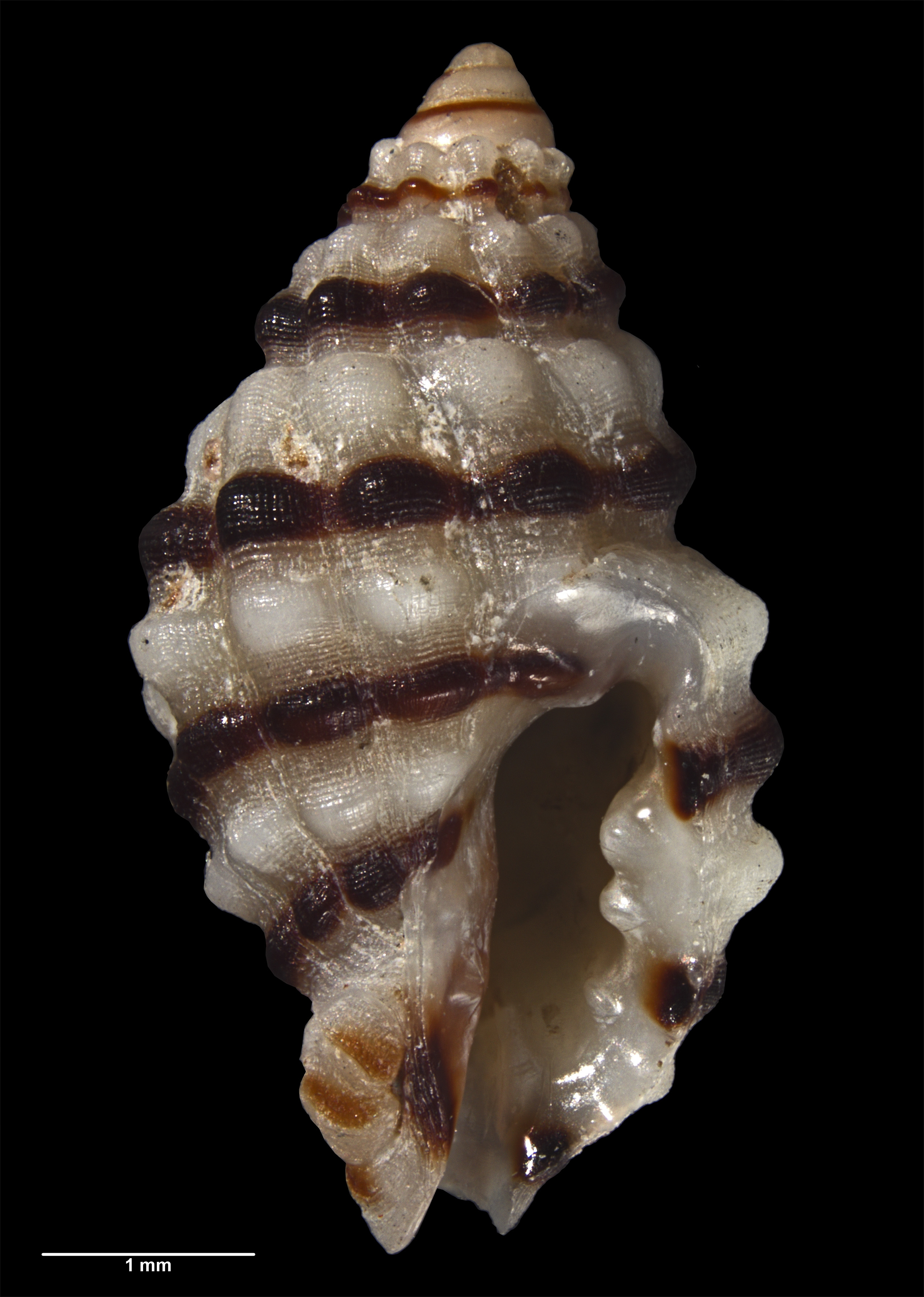
Type specimen

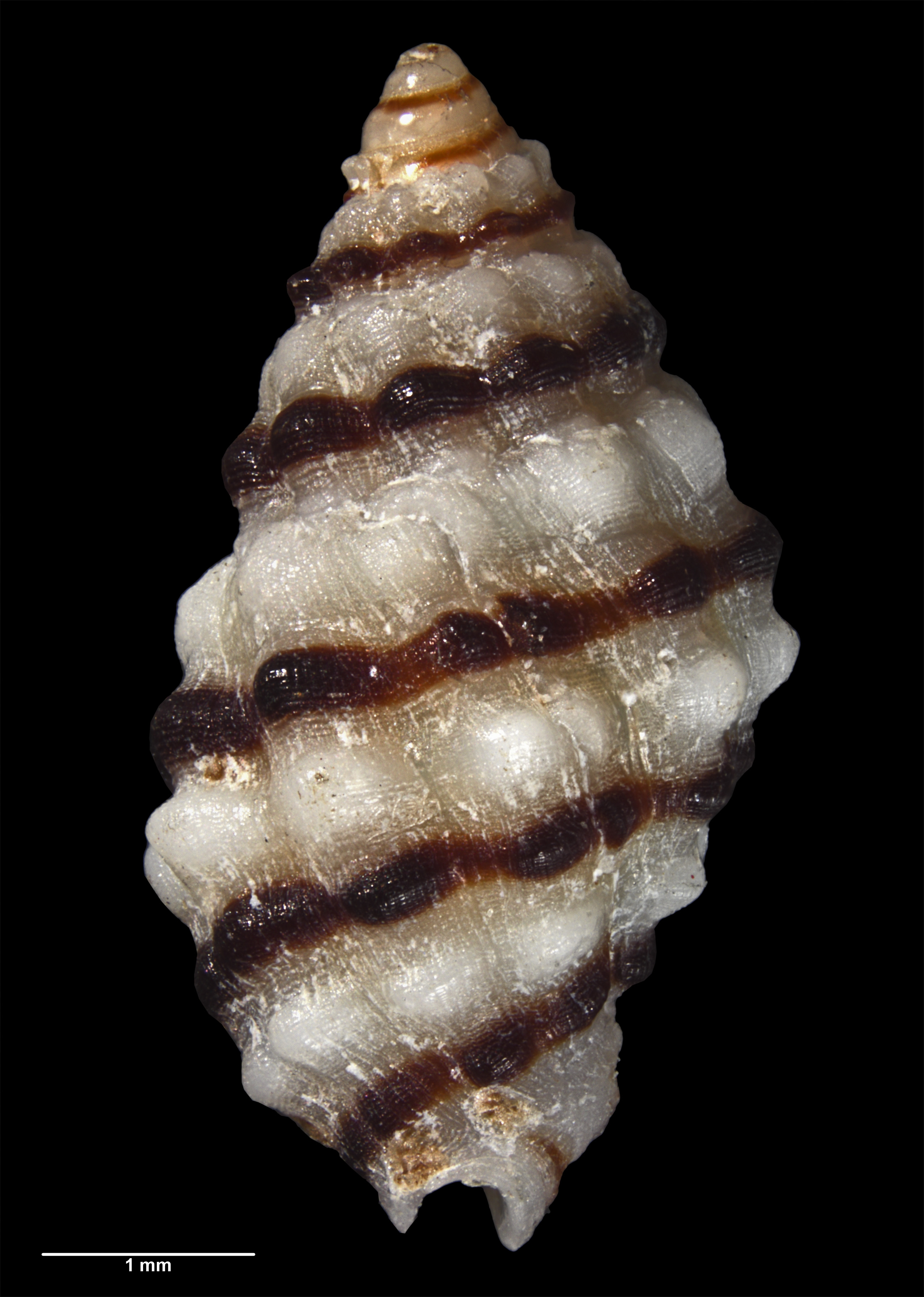
Type specimen (reverse view)
