= Morula variabilis =

Scientific classification
- Kingdom: Animalia
- Phylum: Mollusca
- Class: Gastropoda
- Subclass: Caenogastropoda
- Order: Neogastropoda
- Family: Muricidae
- Genus: Morula
- Species: M. variabilis

Binomial name
- Morula variabilis (Pease, 1868)

Synonyms
- Engina variabilis Pease, 1868

Species of gastropod

Morula variabilis is a species of sea snail, a marine gastropod mollusk in the family Muricidae, the murex snails or rock snails.
