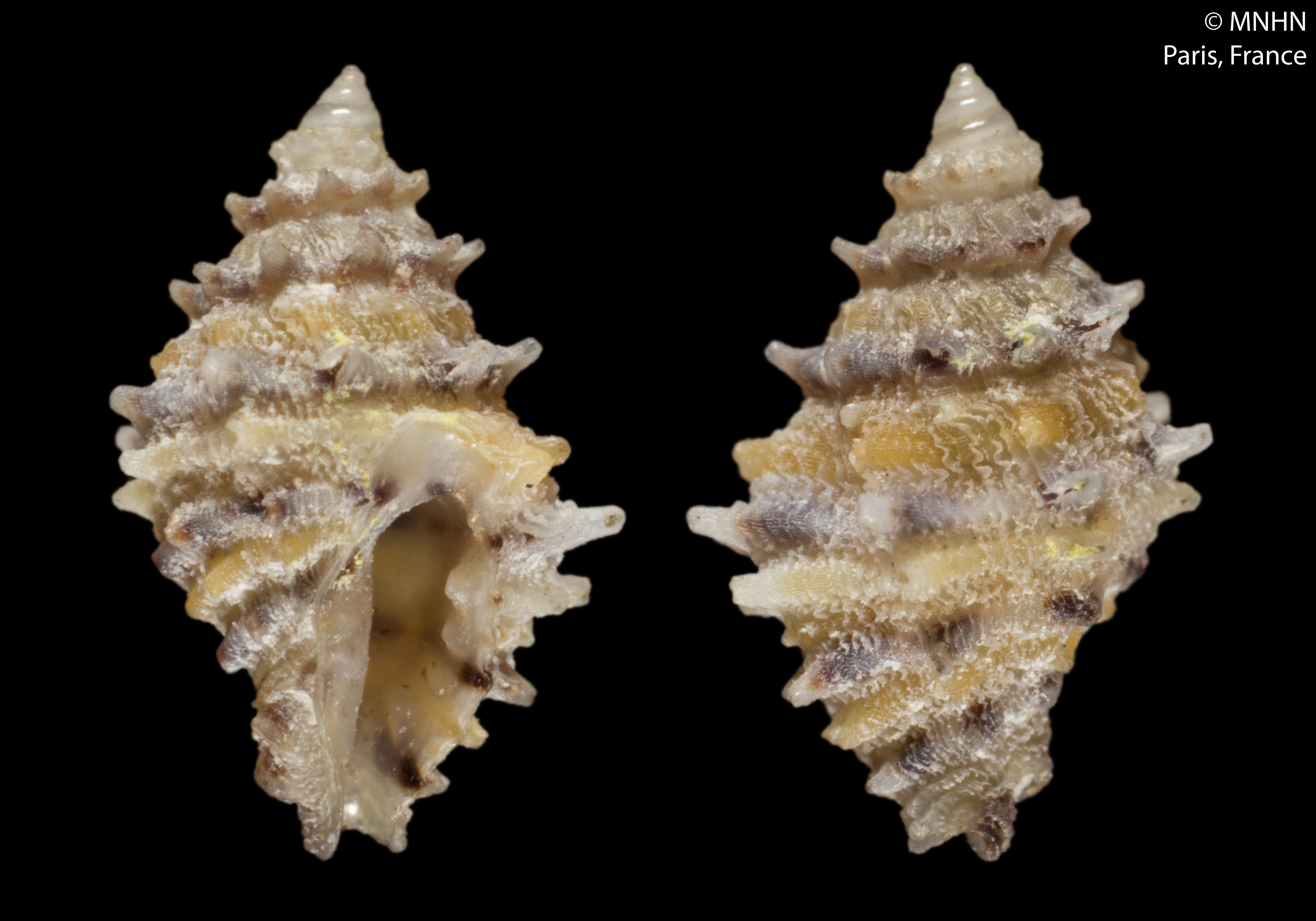
- Morula and Morula cernohorskyi

Scientific classification
- Kingdom: Animalia
- Phylum: Mollusca
- Class: Gastropoda
- Subclass: Caenogastropoda
- Order: Neogastropoda
- Family: Muricidae
- Genus: Morula
- Species: M. cernohorskyi

Binomial name
- Morula cernohorskyi Houart & Tröndle, 1997

Synonyms
- Engina parva Pease, 1868; Morula cernohorskyi Houart & Tröndle, 1997

= Morula cernohorskyi =

Species of gastropod

Morula cernohorskyi is a species of sea snail, a marine gastropod mollusk in the family Muricidae, the murex snails or rock snails.

== Distribution ==
This marine species occurs off Mururoa, French Polynesia
