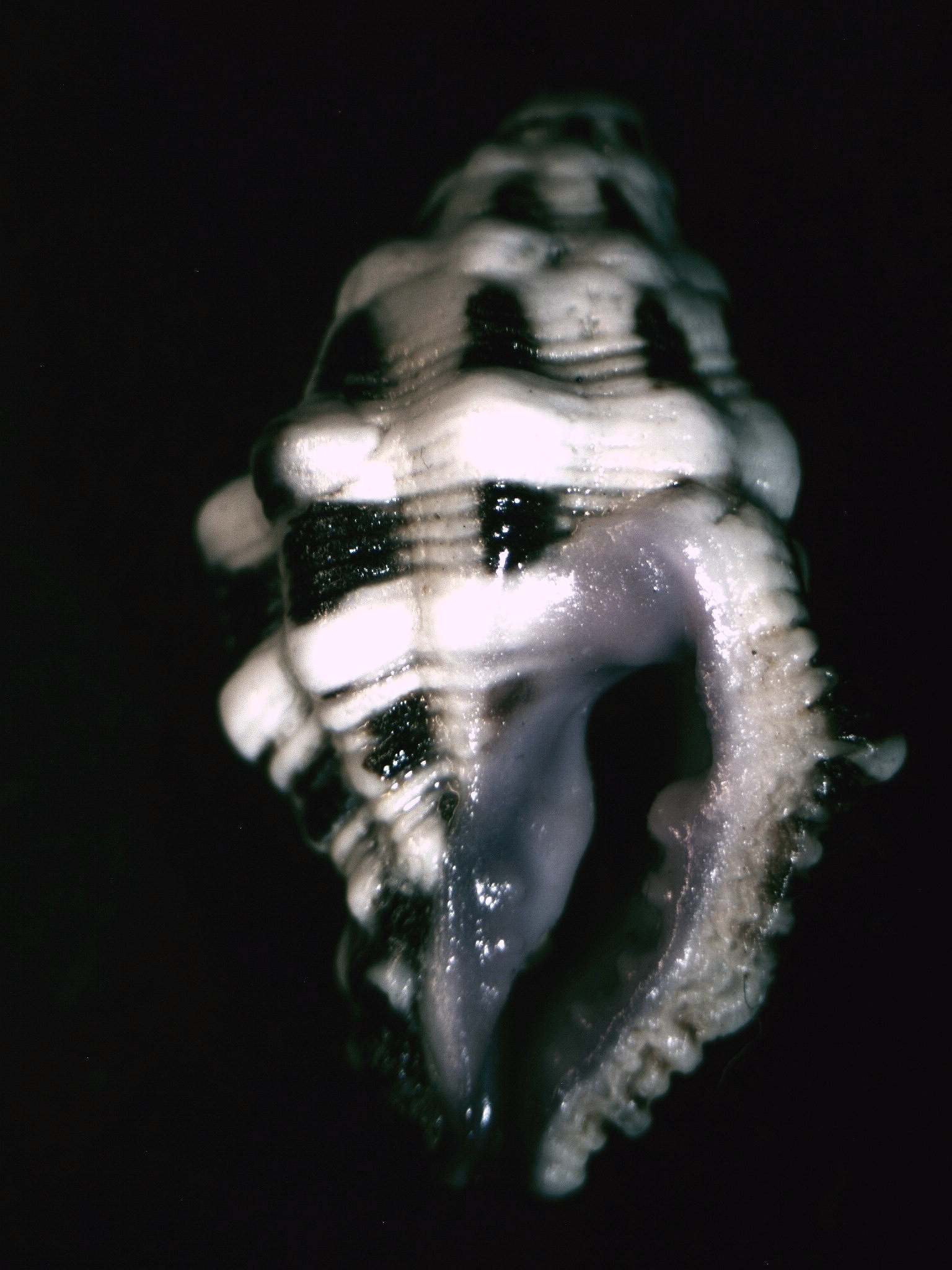
- A shell of Morula (Habromorula) striata

Scientific classification
- Kingdom: Animalia
- Phylum: Mollusca
- Class: Gastropoda
- Subclass: Caenogastropoda
- Order: Neogastropoda
- Family: Muricidae
- Genus: Morula
- Species: M. striata

Binomial name
- Morula striata (Pease, 1868)

Synonyms
- Engina striata Pease, 1868 (original combination); Morula (Habromorula) striata (Pease, 1868)

= Morula striata =

Species of gastropod

Morula (Habromorula) striata, common name the striate rock shell, is a species of small predatory sea snail, a marine gastropod mollusk in the family Muricidae, the murex snails or rock snails.

== Description ==
The length of the shell varies between 10 mm and 20 mm.

== Distribution ==
This marine species occurs in the Indo-West Pacific and off Japan.
