= Morula porphyrostoma =

Scientific classification
- Kingdom: Animalia
- Phylum: Mollusca
- Class: Gastropoda
- Subclass: Caenogastropoda
- Order: Neogastropoda
- Family: Muricidae
- Genus: Morula
- Species: M. porphyrostoma

Binomial name
- Morula porphyrostoma (Reeve, 1846)

Synonyms
- Morula (Habromorula) porphyrostoma (Reeve, 1846); Ricinula porphyrostoma Reeve, 1846

Species of gastropod

Morula porphyrostoma is a species of sea snail, a marine gastropod mollusk in the family Muricidae, the murex snails or rock snails.
