= Morula albanigra =

Scientific classification
- Kingdom: Animalia
- Phylum: Mollusca
- Class: Gastropoda
- Subclass: Caenogastropoda
- Order: Neogastropoda
- Family: Muricidae
- Genus: Morula
- Species: M. albanigra

Binomial name
- Morula albanigra Houart, 2002

Species of gastropod

Morula albanigra is a species of sea snail, a marine gastropod mollusk in the family Muricidae, the murex snails or rock snails.
