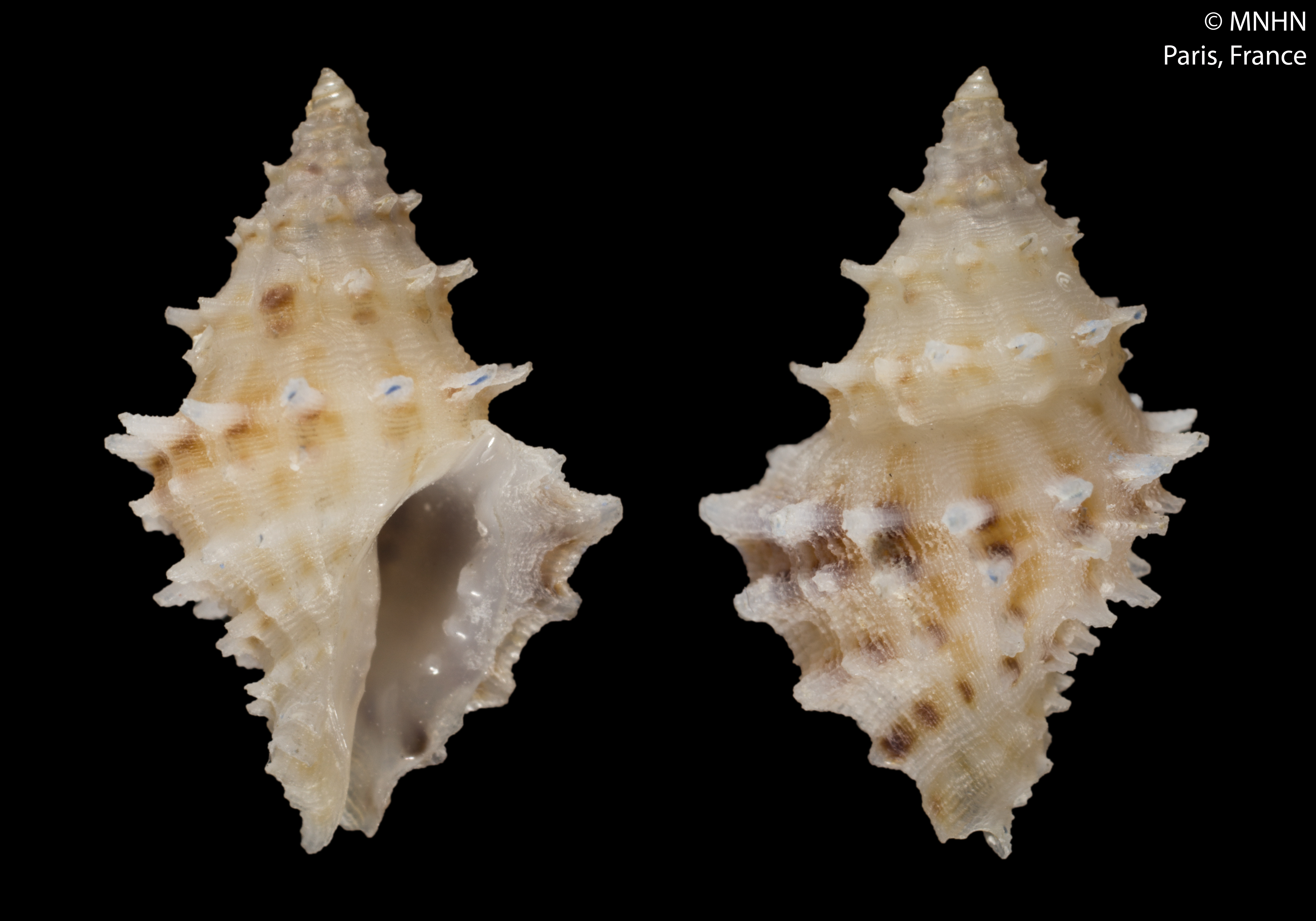

Scientific classification
- Kingdom: Animalia
- Phylum: Mollusca
- Class: Gastropoda
- Subclass: Caenogastropoda
- Order: Neogastropoda
- Family: Muricidae
- Genus: Morula
- Species: M. rodgersi

Binomial name
- Morula rodgersi Houart, 2000

Synonyms
- Morula (Morula) rodgersi Houart, 2000

= Morula rodgersi =

Species of gastropod

Morula rodgersi is a species of sea snail, a marine gastropod mollusk in the family Muricidae, the murex snails or rock snails.

== Distribution ==
This marine species occurs off Guam.
