= Morula japonica =

Scientific classification
- Kingdom: Animalia
- Phylum: Mollusca
- Class: Gastropoda
- Subclass: Caenogastropoda
- Order: Neogastropoda
- Family: Muricidae
- Genus: Morula
- Species: M. japonica

Binomial name
- Morula japonica (Sowerby, 1903)

Synonyms
- Drupa andrewsi (E. A. Smith, 1909); Morula (Habromorula) japonica (G. B. Sowerby III, 1903)· accepted, alternate representation; Pentadactylus japonicus Sowerby, 1903; Sistrum (Ricinula) morus var. borealis Pilsbry, 1904; Sistrum andrewsi Smith, 1909

Species of gastropod

Morula japonica is a species of sea snail, a marine gastropod mollusk in the family Muricidae, the murex snails or rock snails.

== Distribution ==
This marine species occurs off Japan.
