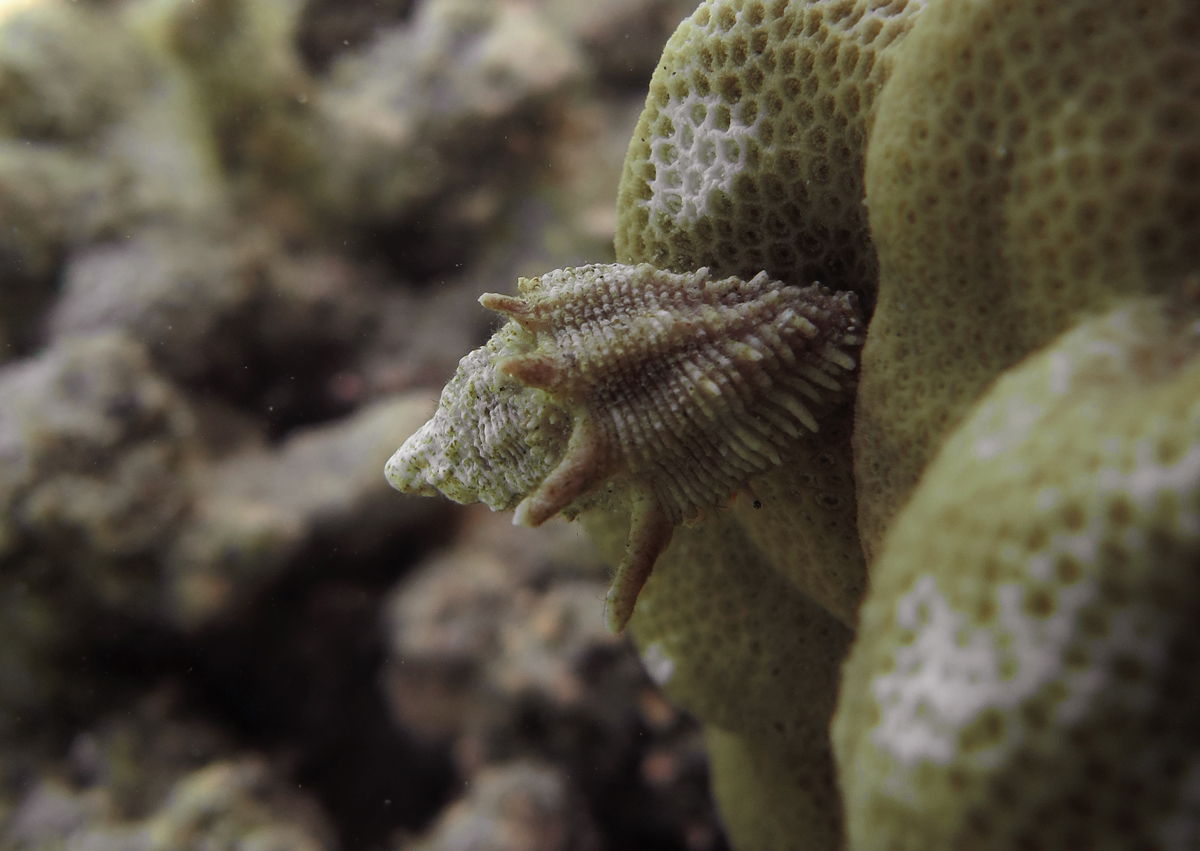
- Morula coronata

Scientific classification
- Kingdom: Animalia
- Phylum: Mollusca
- Class: Gastropoda
- Subclass: Caenogastropoda
- Order: Neogastropoda
- Family: Muricidae
- Genus: Morula
- Species: M. coronata

Binomial name
- Morula coronata (H. Adams, 1869)

Synonyms
- Coralliophila coronata H. Adams, 1869; Morula (Cronia) coronata (H. Adams, 1869); Morula (Habromorula) coronata (H. Adams, 1869)

= Morula coronata =

Species of gastropod

Morula coronata is a species of sea snail, a marine gastropod mollusk in the family Muricidae, the murex snails or rock snails.

== Description ==
The sea snail was described by Henry Adams in 1869 after locating it on Barkly Island, Mauritius. It was originally named Coralliophila coronata.
