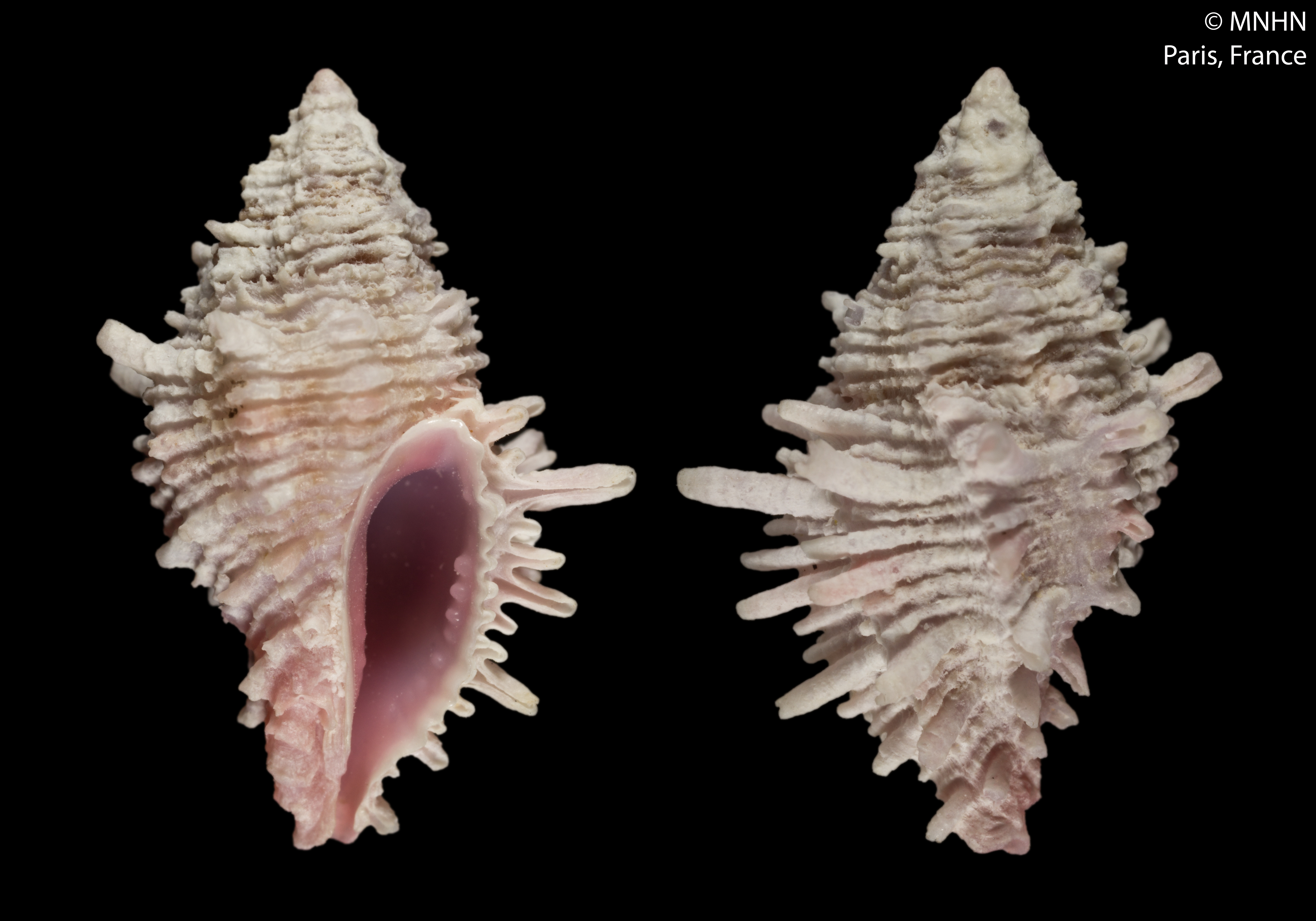

Scientific classification
- Kingdom: Animalia
- Phylum: Mollusca
- Class: Gastropoda
- Subclass: Caenogastropoda
- Order: Neogastropoda
- Family: Muricidae
- Genus: Morula
- Subgenus: Habromorula
- Species: M. ambrosia

Binomial name
- Morula ambrosia (Houart, 1995)

Synonyms
- Habromorula ambrosia Houart, 1995; Morula (Habromorula) ambrosia (Houart, 1995)

= Morula ambrosia =

Species of gastropod

Morula ambrosia is a species of sea snail, a marine gastropod mollusk in the family Muricidae, the murex snails or rock snails.

== Distribution ==
This marine species occurs off the Marshall Islands.
