= Morula echinata =

Scientific classification
- Kingdom: Animalia
- Phylum: Mollusca
- Class: Gastropoda
- Subclass: Caenogastropoda
- Order: Neogastropoda
- Family: Muricidae
- Genus: Morula
- Species: M. echinata

Binomial name
- Morula echinata (Reeve, 1846)

Synonyms
- Engina monilifera Pease, 1860; Engina nodulifera Pease, W.H. 1860; Ricinula echinata Reeve, 1846

Species of gastropod

Morula echinata, common name the prickled-armed ricinula, is a species of sea snail, a marine gastropod mollusk in the family Muricidae, the murex snails or rock snails.

== Description ==
The length of the shell varies between 7 mm and 10 mm.

== Distribution ==
This marine species occurs in the tropical Indo-West Pacific; also off Taiwan and Australia (Queensland).
