= Morula fuscoimbricata =

Scientific classification
- Kingdom: Animalia
- Phylum: Mollusca
- Class: Gastropoda
- Subclass: Caenogastropoda
- Order: Neogastropoda
- Family: Muricidae
- Genus: Morula
- Species: M. fuscoimbricata

Binomial name
- Morula fuscoimbricata (Sowerby, 1915)

Synonyms
- Drupa walkerae Pilsbry & Bryan, 1918; Pentadactylus (Sistrum) fuscoimbricata Sowerby, 1915; Pentadactylus fuscoimbricata Sowerby, 1915

Species of gastropod

Morula fuscoimbricata is a species of sea snail, a marine gastropod mollusk in the family Muricidae, the murex snails or rock snails.
