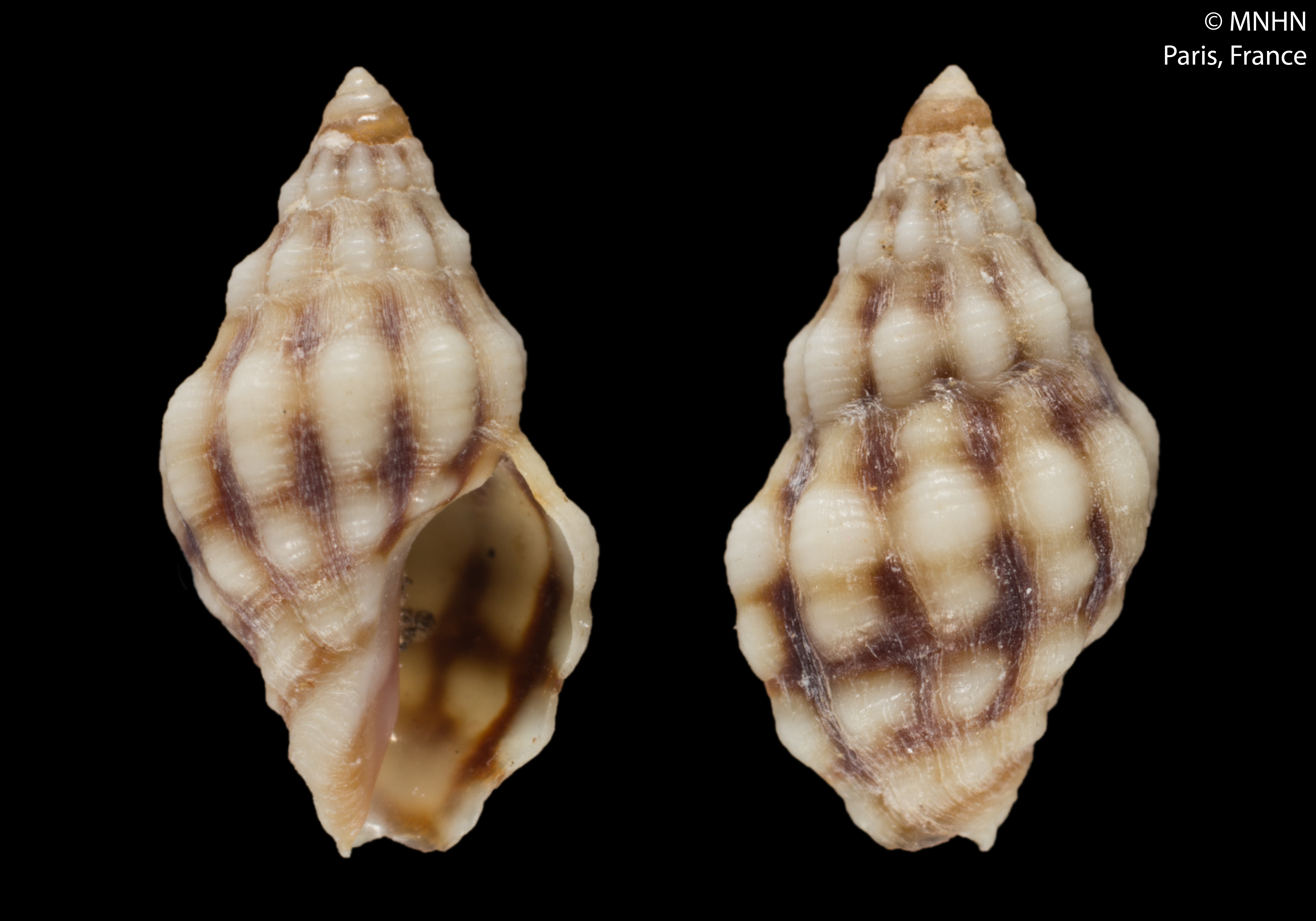
- Shell of Morula peasei (paratype at MNHN, Paris)

Scientific classification
- Kingdom: Animalia
- Phylum: Mollusca
- Class: Gastropoda
- Subclass: Caenogastropoda
- Order: Neogastropoda
- Family: Muricidae
- Genus: Morula
- Species: M. peasei

Binomial name
- Morula peasei Houart, 2002

Synonyms
- Morula (Morula) peasei Houart, 2002· accepted, alternate representation

= Morula peasei =

Species of gastropod

Morula peasei is a species of sea snail, a marine gastropod mollusk in the family Muricidae, the murex snails or rock snails.

== Distribution ==
This marine species occurs off Tahiti, French Polynesia
