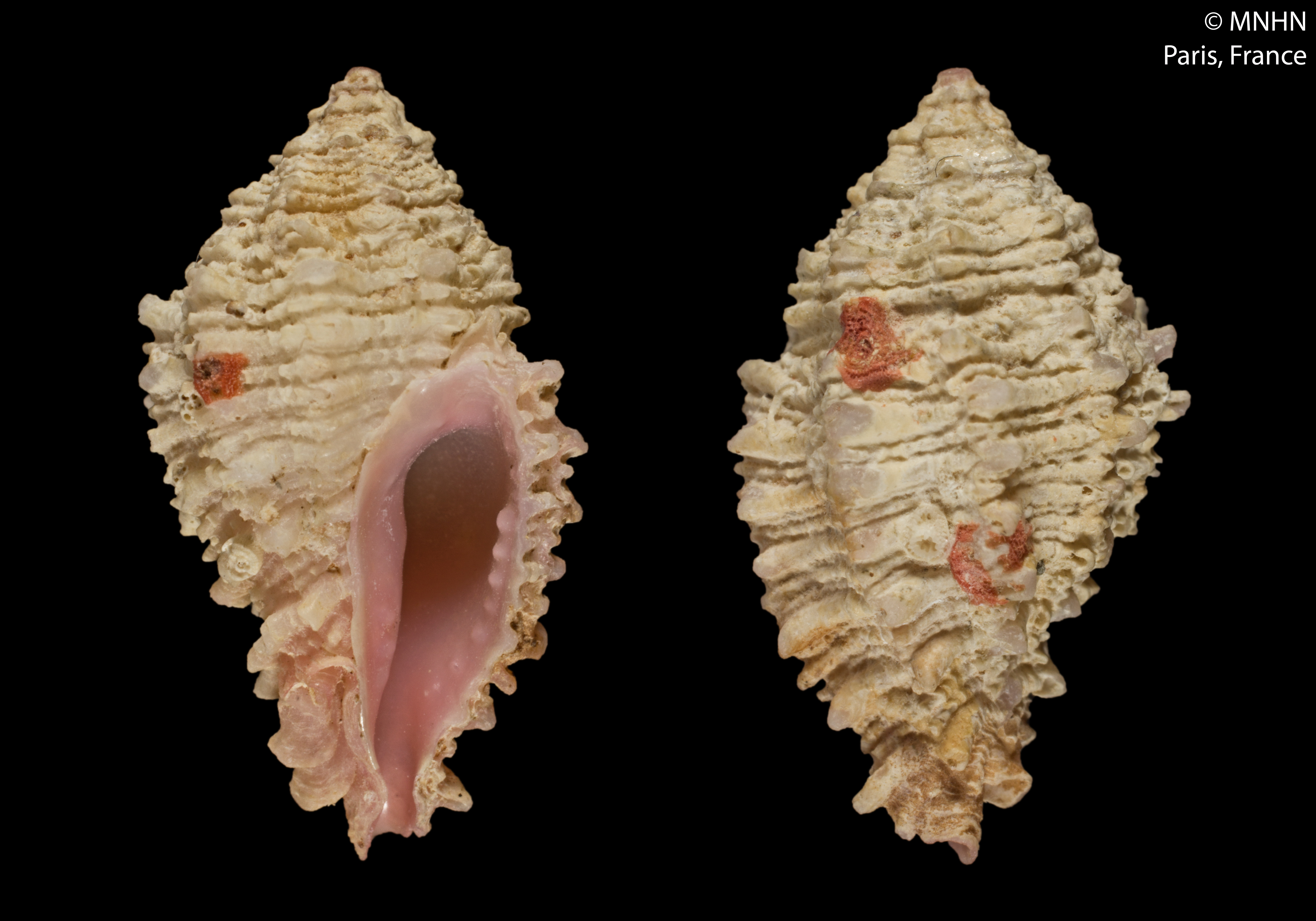

Scientific classification
- Kingdom: Animalia
- Phylum: Mollusca
- Class: Gastropoda
- Subclass: Caenogastropoda
- Order: Neogastropoda
- Family: Muricidae
- Genus: Morula
- Species: M. euryspira

Binomial name
- Morula euryspira Houart, 1995

Synonyms
- Habromorula euryspira Houart, 1995; Morula (Habromorula) euryspira (Houart, 1995)

= Morula euryspira =

Species of gastropod

Morula euryspira is a species of sea snail, a marine gastropod mollusk in the family Muricidae, the murex snails or rock snails.

== Description ==
The length of the shell attains 15.5 mm.

== Distribution ==
This marine species occurs off New Caledonia.
