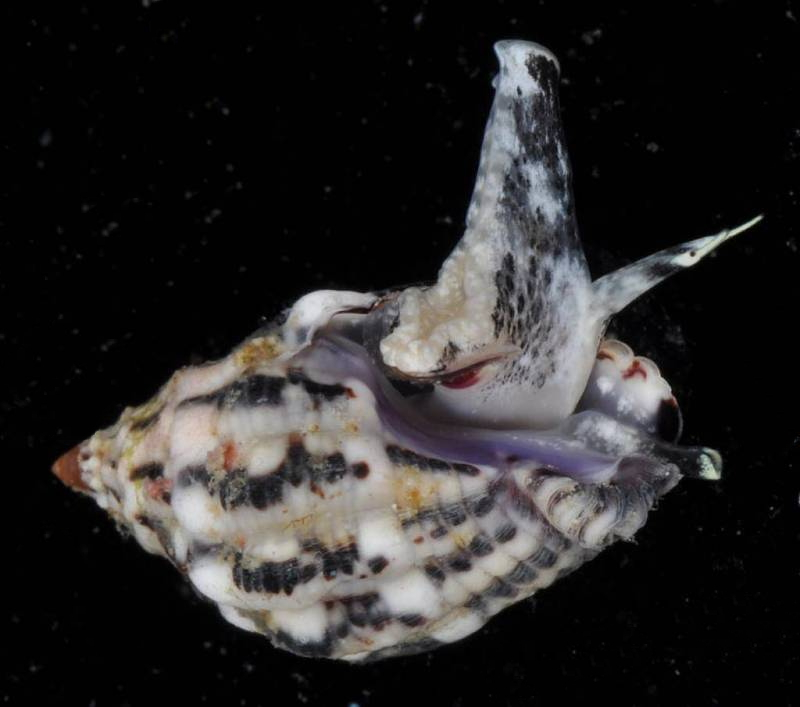
- Morula zebrina (specimen at the Smithsonian Institution)

Scientific classification
- Kingdom: Animalia
- Phylum: Mollusca
- Class: Gastropoda
- Subclass: Caenogastropoda
- Order: Neogastropoda
- Family: Muricidae
- Genus: Morula
- Species: M. zebrina

Binomial name
- Morula zebrina Houart, 2004

Synonyms
- Engina striata Pease, 1868; Morula (Morula) zebrina Houart, 2004 · alternate representation; Sistrum striatum Pease, 1868

= Morula zebrina =

Species of gastropod

Morula zebrina is a species of sea snail, a marine gastropod mollusk in the family Muricidae, the murex snails or rock snails.
