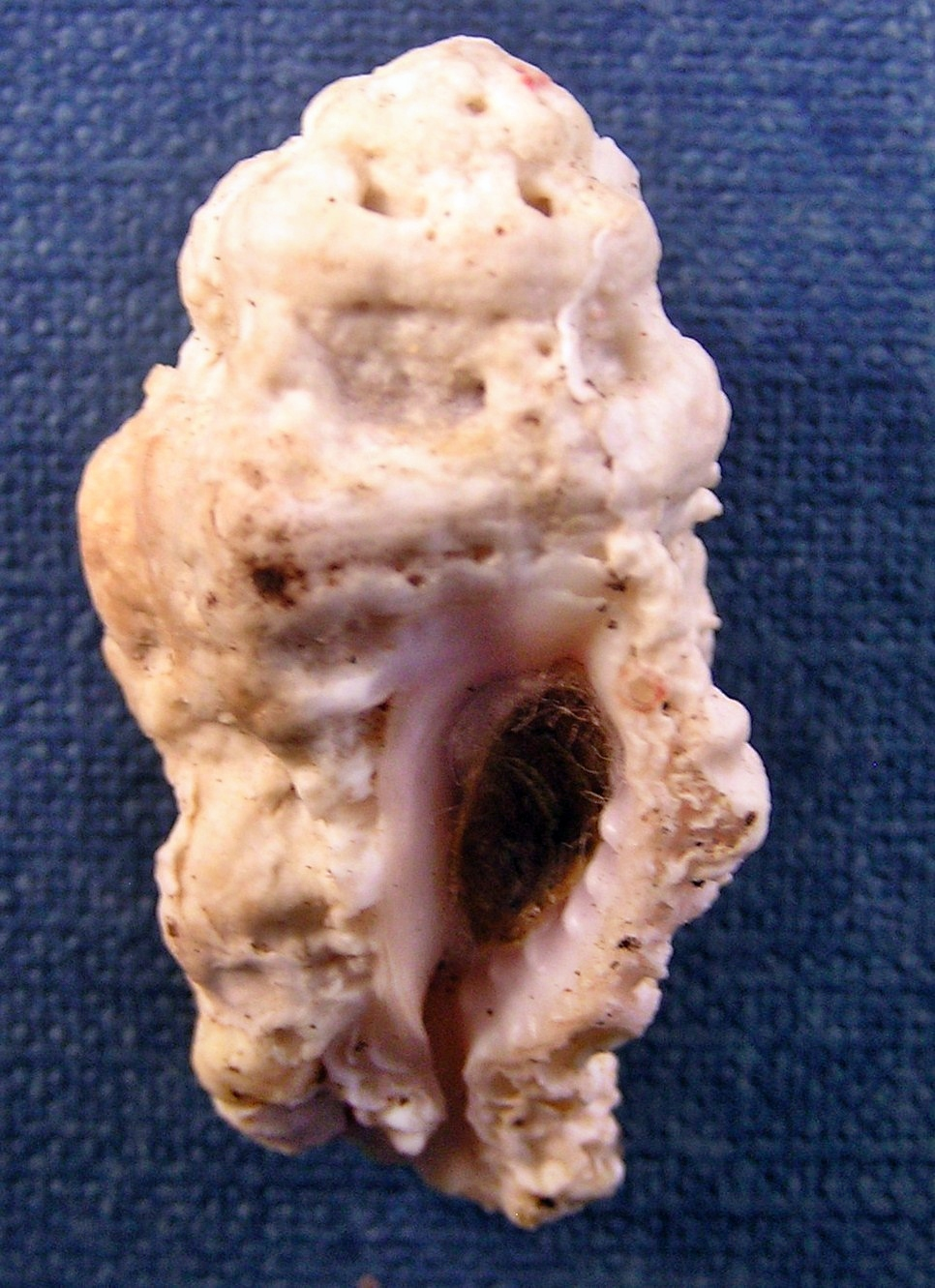
- Murichorda jacobsoni

Scientific classification
- Kingdom: Animalia
- Phylum: Mollusca
- Class: Gastropoda
- Subclass: Caenogastropoda
- Order: Neogastropoda
- Family: Muricidae
- Genus: Murichorda
- Species: M. jacobsoni

Binomial name
- Murichorda jacobsoni (Emerson & D'Attilio, 1981)

Synonyms
- Muricodrupa jacobsoni Emerson & D'Attilio, 1981

= Murichorda jacobsoni =

Species of gastropod

Murichorda jacobsoni is a species of sea snail, a marine gastropod mollusk in the family Muricidae, the murex snails or rock snails.

== Description ==
This species is mostly found in the size of 38 millimetres (1.5 in). It lives in marine environments.

== Distribution ==
It is found in Mozambique and Fiji.

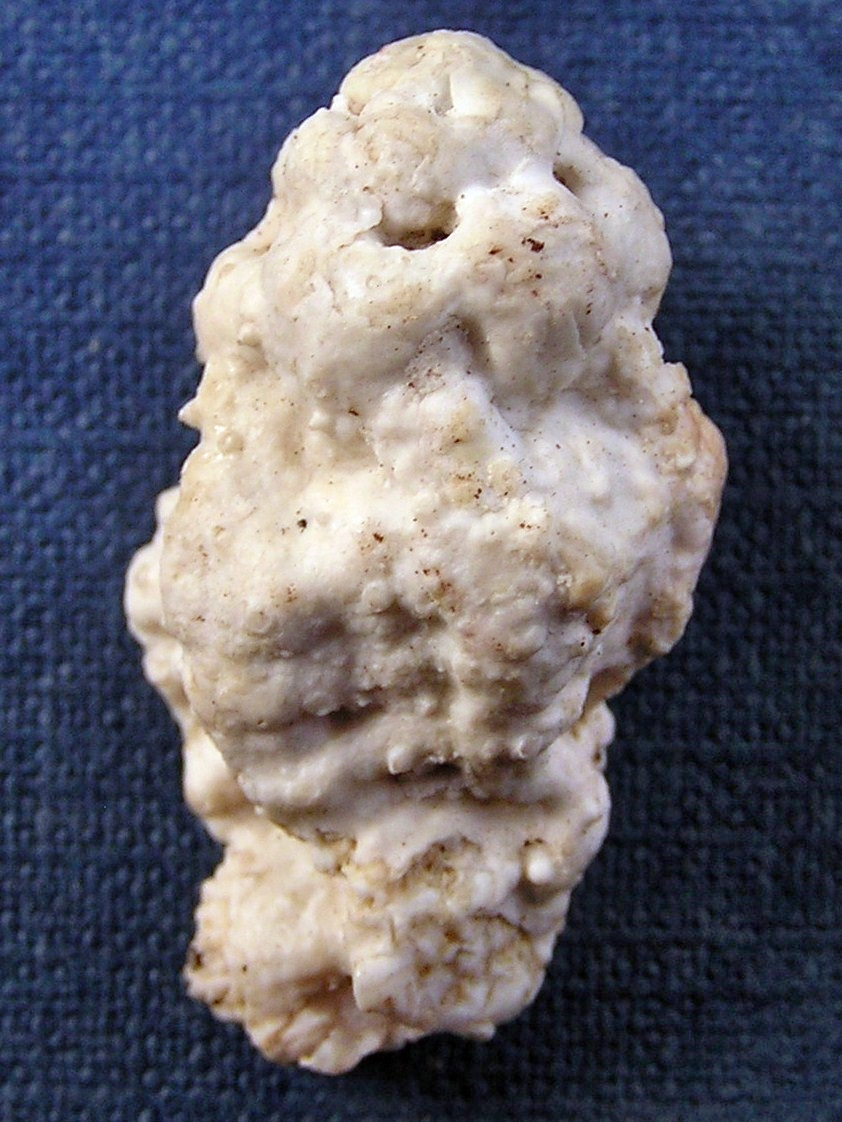
Muricodrupa jacobsoni, abapertural view
