= Muricodrupa anaxares =

Scientific classification
- Kingdom: Animalia
- Phylum: Mollusca
- Class: Gastropoda
- Subclass: Caenogastropoda
- Order: Neogastropoda
- Family: Muricidae
- Genus: Muricodrupa
- Species: M. anaxares

Binomial name
- Muricodrupa anaxares (Kiener, 1835)

Synonyms
- Drupa anaxares (Kiener, 1835); Morula (Morula) anaxares (Kiener, 1835); Morula anaxares (Kiener, 1835); Morula anaxeres [sic] (misspelling); Purpura anaxares Kiener, 1835 (basionym); Ricinula anaxares (Kiener, 1835); Sistrum anaxares (Kiener, 1835)

Species of gastropod

Muricodrupa anaxares is a species of sea snail, a marine gastropod mollusk in the family Muricidae, the murex snails or rock snails. Before 2019, it was classified as Morula anaxares.

== Description ==
The shell size varies between 13 mm and 26 mm. It comes in all colours, but mostly in brown.

== Distribution ==
This species is found at rocky shores in the Red Sea, in the Indian Ocean off Aldabra, Chagos, Kenya, Madagascar, the Mascarene Basin and Tanzania and in the Indo-West Pacific; off Australia (Northern Territory, Queensland, Western Australia).
