= Phrygiomurex =

Scientific classification
- Kingdom: Animalia
- Phylum: Mollusca
- Class: Gastropoda
- Subclass: Caenogastropoda
- Order: Neogastropoda
- Family: Muricidae
- Genus: Phrygiomurex; Dall, 1904
- Species: P. sculptilis

Binomial name
- Phrygiomurex sculptilis (Reeve, 1844)

Synonyms
- Genus synonymy: Colubraria (Phrygiomurex) Dall, 1904; Species synonymy: Phyllocoma sculptilis (Reeve, 1846); Triton sculptilis Reeve, 1844

Genus of gastropods

Phrygiomurex is a genus of sea snails, marine gastropod mollusks in the family Muricidae, the murex snails or rock snails. The genus contains the single species Phrygiomurex sculptilis.
