= Murichorda rumphiusi =

Scientific classification
- Kingdom: Animalia
- Phylum: Mollusca
- Class: Gastropoda
- Subclass: Caenogastropoda
- Order: Neogastropoda
- Family: Muricidae
- Genus: Murichorda
- Species: M. rumphiusi

Binomial name
- Murichorda rumphiusi Houart, 1996

Synonyms
- Morula (Morula) rumphiusi Houart, 1996; Morula rumphiusi Houart, 1996

Species of gastropod

Murichorda rumphiusi is a species of sea snail, a marine gastropod mollusk in the family Muricidae, the murex snails or rock snails.
