= Lauta parva =

Scientific classification
- Kingdom: Animalia
- Phylum: Mollusca
- Class: Gastropoda
- Subclass: Caenogastropoda
- Order: Neogastropoda
- Family: Muricidae
- Genus: Lauta
- Species: L. parva

Binomial name
- Lauta parva (Reeve, 1846)

Synonyms
- Morula (Morula) parva (Reeve, 1846); Morula parva (Reeve, 1846); Ricinula parva Reeve, 1846

Species of gastropod

Lauta parva is a species of sea snail, a marine gastropod mollusk in the family Muricidae, the murex snails or rock snails.
