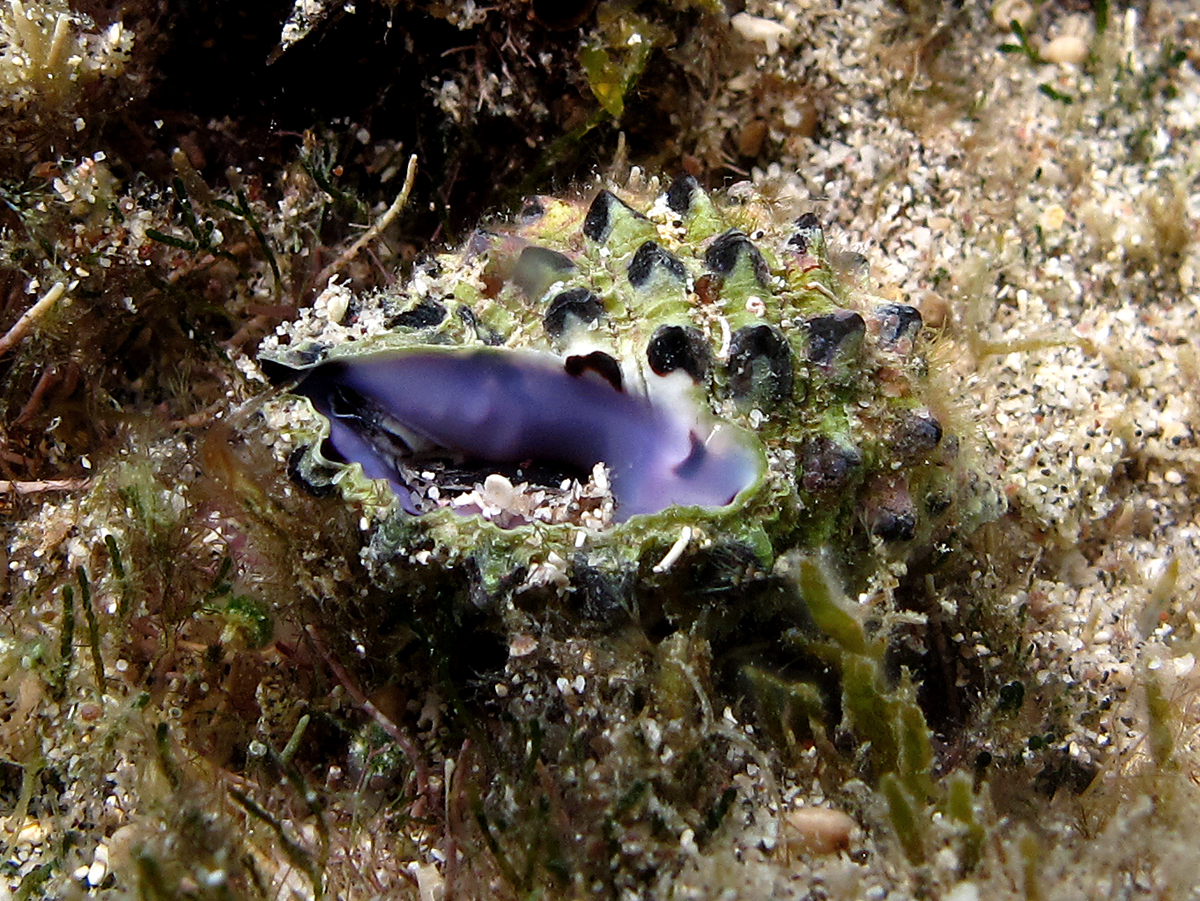
- Morula uva

Scientific classification
- Kingdom: Animalia
- Phylum: Mollusca
- Class: Gastropoda
- Subclass: Caenogastropoda
- Order: Neogastropoda
- Family: Muricidae
- Genus: Morula
- Species: M. uva

Binomial name
- Morula uva (Röding, 1798)

Synonyms
- Drupa uva Röding, 1798; Morula papillosa Schumacher, 1817; Morula (Morula) uva (Röding, 1798); Murex morum Fischer, 1807; Purpura sphaeridia Duclos, 1832; Ricinula alba Mörch, 1852; Ricinula morus Lamarck, 1822; Sistrum (Ricinula) morus (Lamarck, 1822)

= Morula uva =

Species of gastropod

Morula uva is a species of sea snail, a marine gastropod mollusk in the family Muricidae, the murex snails or rock snails.

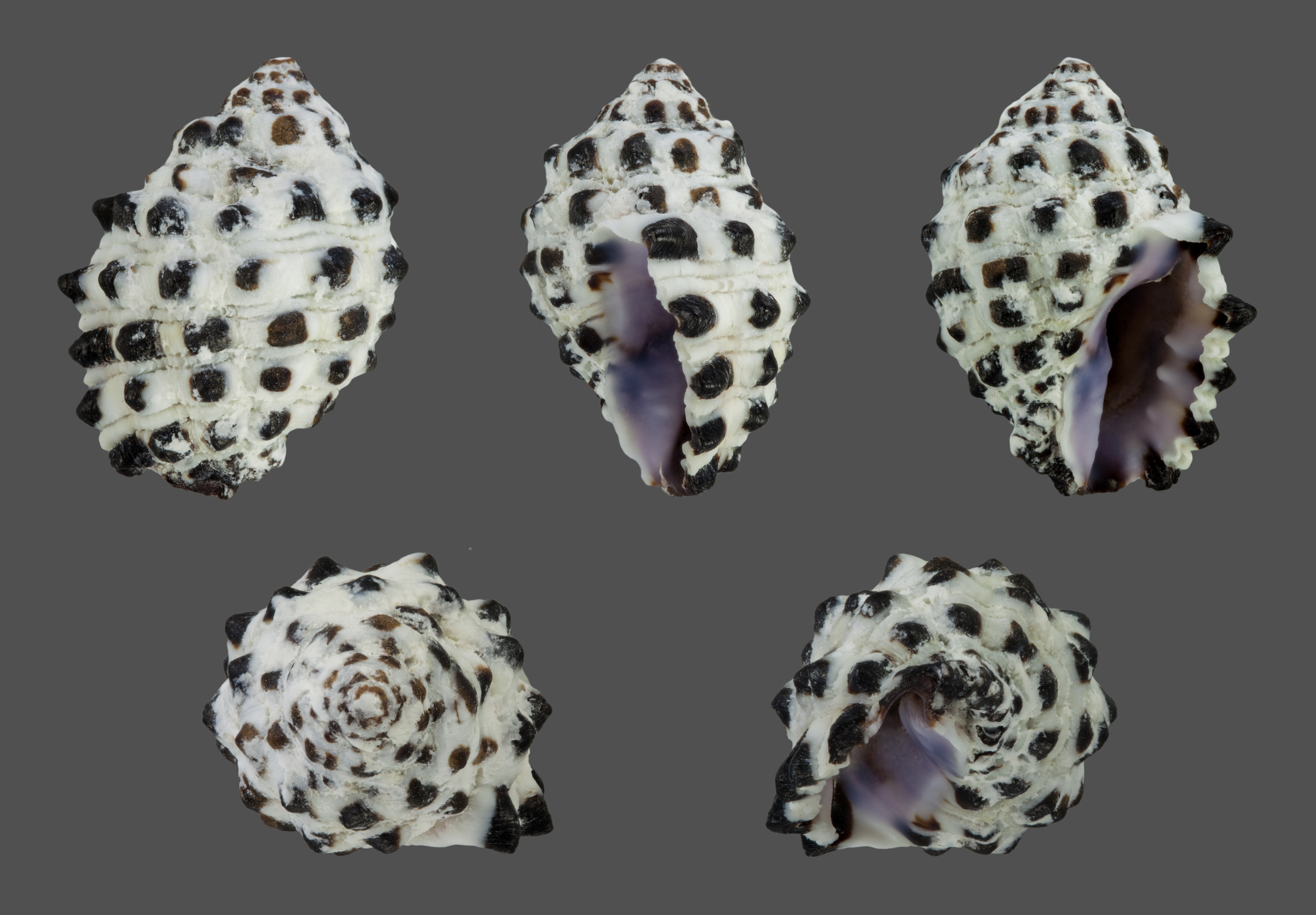

== Description ==
Morula uva has a shell that can be either colored white or purple with rows of dark tubercles. The mouth has a shade color of light violet with toothlike projections. There are various sizes and lengths of M. uva, some can be 15mm by 9mm, others can be smaller.

== Distribution ==
Morula uva can be found in the tropical Indo-Pacific, which includes: the Red Sea and the Indian Ocean off Aldabra, Chagos, Madagascar, the Mascarene Basin and Tanzania, Iluka and Woolgoolga, New South Wales, and Hawaii.

== Biology ==
Morula uva are scavengers and hunt their prey, whether it be fellow marine gastropod mollusk or other. In boulder zone habitats, M. uva competes with Drupa ricinus when feeding on Denropoma. In mid-reef flat rocky substratum, where Dendropoma are less common, Morula uva feed mainly upon small individuals or small species of the herbivorous gastropod family Cerithiidae.

== Uses & Cultural Significance ==
Uses of Morula uva vary in their design of their shells. Just like other gastropods, their shells are used for ornamental value or shaped into toys and models. Another use is artists using the shells as a canvas and paint their creative ideas onto the shell and sell them to customers.
