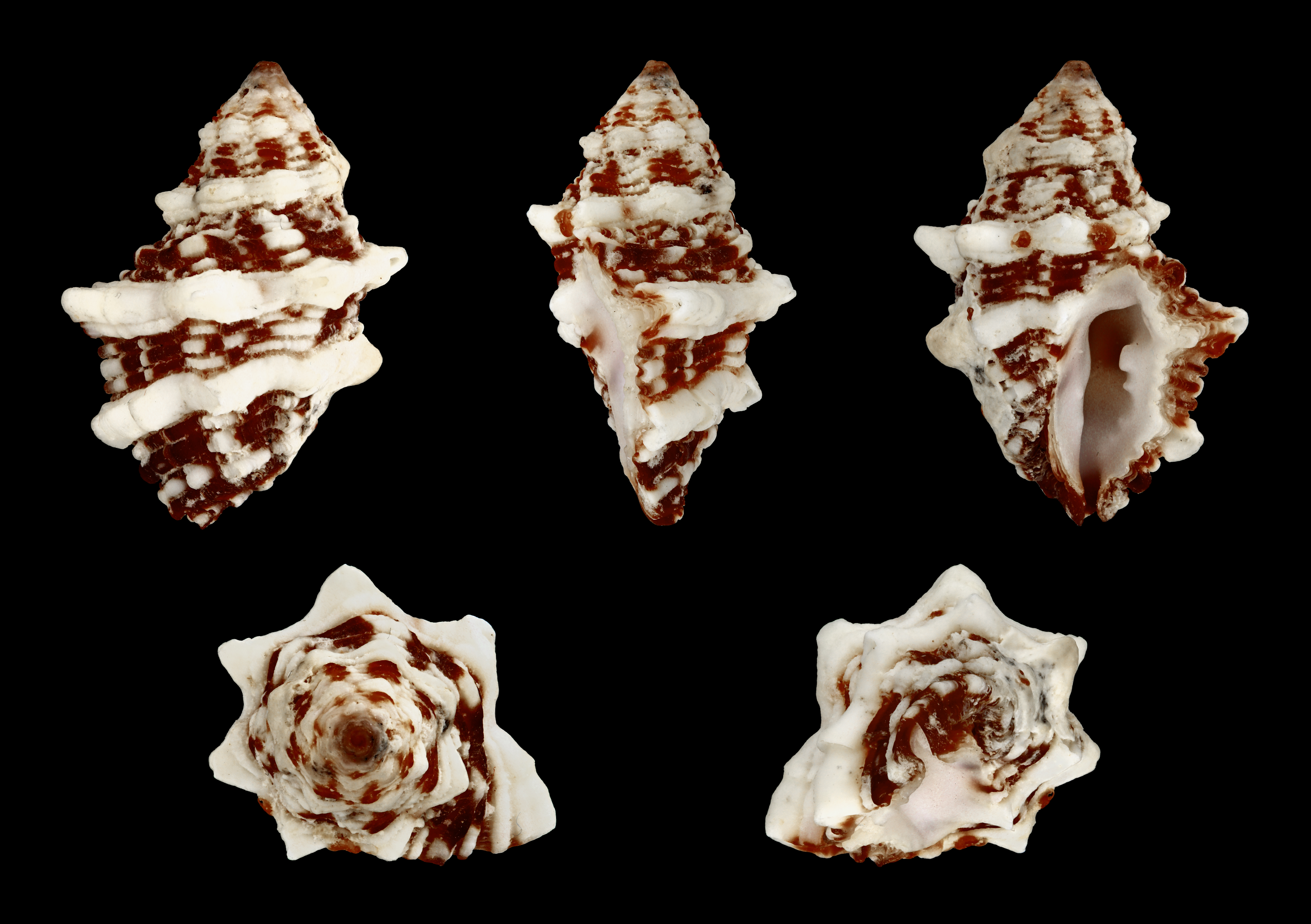
- Five views of a shell of Morula biconica

Scientific classification
- Kingdom: Animalia
- Phylum: Mollusca
- Class: Gastropoda
- Subclass: Caenogastropoda
- Order: Neogastropoda
- Family: Muricidae
- Genus: Morula
- Subgenus: Habromorula
- Species: M. biconica

Binomial name
- Morula biconica (Blainville, 1832)

Synonyms
- Drupa biconica (Blainville, 1832); Engina slootsi De Jong & Coomans, 1988; Morula (Habromorula) biconica (Blainville, 1832)· accepted, alternate representation; Purpura biconica Blainville, 1832; Ricinula biconica (Blainville, 1832)

= Morula biconica =

Species of gastropod

Morula biconica, the biconic rock shell, is a species of sea snail, a marine gastropod mollusk in the family Muricidae, the murex snails or rock snails.

== Description ==
The shell size varies between 13 mm and 30 mm.

== Distribution ==
This species is found in the Indian Ocean along Réunion, Madagascar, the Mascarene Basin and in the Indo-West Pacific.
