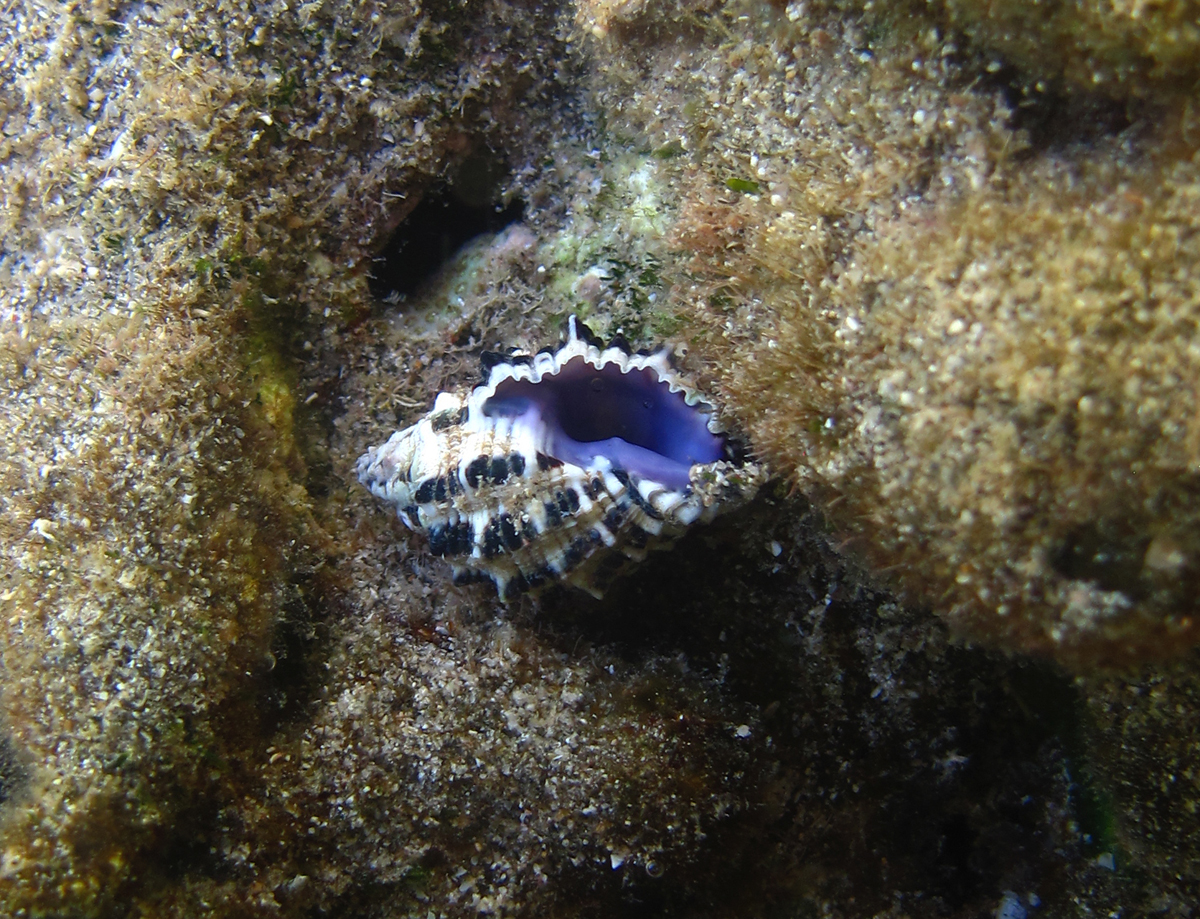

Scientific classification
- Kingdom: Animalia
- Phylum: Mollusca
- Class: Gastropoda
- Subclass: Caenogastropoda
- Order: Neogastropoda
- Family: Muricidae
- Genus: Morula
- Species: M. aspera

Binomial name
- Morula aspera (Lamarck, 1816)

Synonyms
- Drupa aspera (Lamarck, 1816); Morula (Morula) aspera (Lamarck, 1816); Ricinula aspera Lamarck, 1816

= Morula aspera =

Species of gastropod

Morula aspera is a species of sea snail, a marine gastropod mollusk in the family Muricidae, the murex snails or rock snails.

== Description ==
Morula is a genus of small to medium-sized sea snails, commonly known as auger snails, and they are typically found in marine environments.The shell size is between 11 mm and 17 mm,

== Distribution ==
This species is found along South East Africa and Japan.
