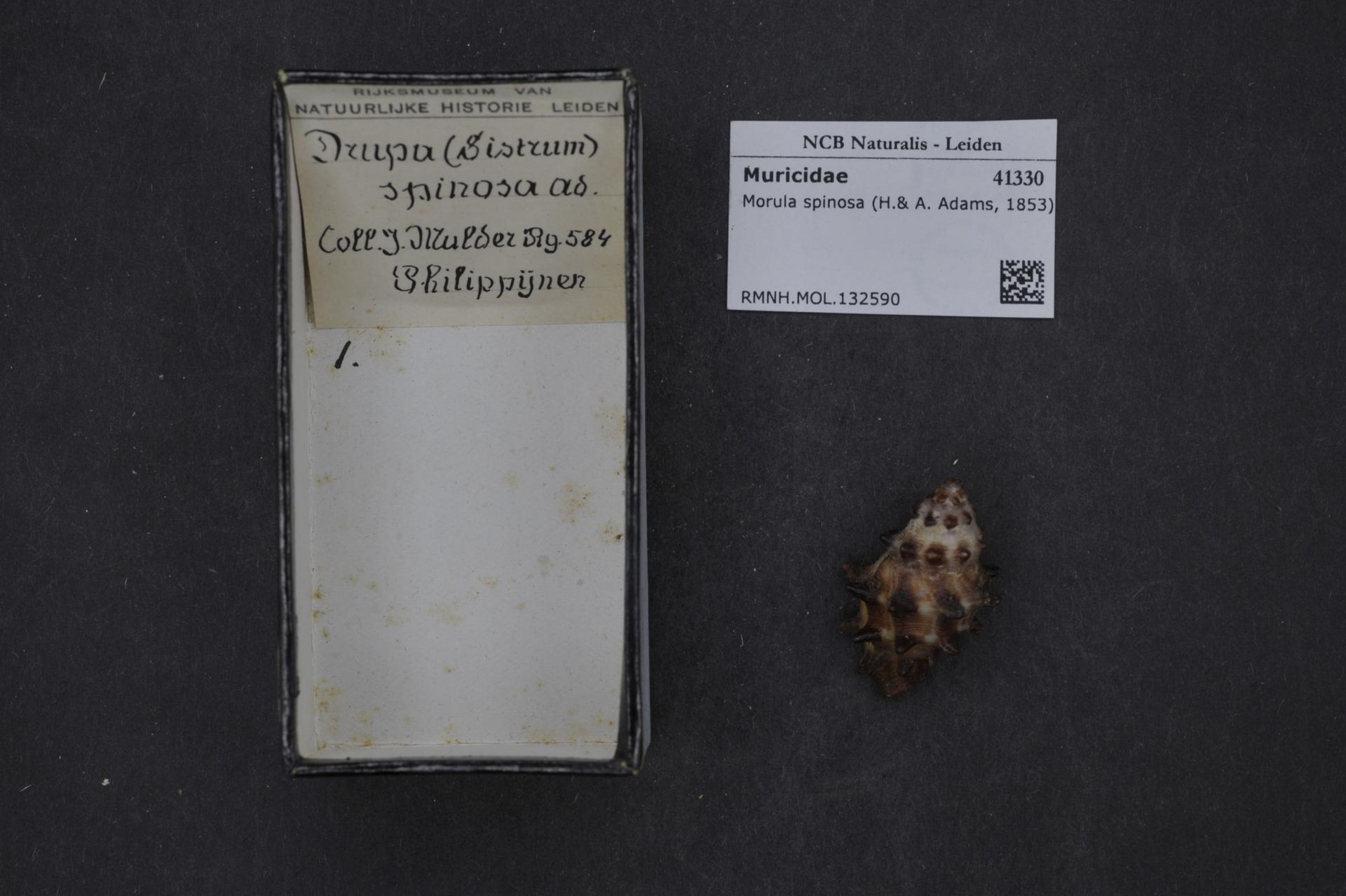

Scientific classification
- Kingdom: Animalia
- Phylum: Mollusca
- Class: Gastropoda
- Subclass: Caenogastropoda
- Order: Neogastropoda
- Family: Muricidae
- Genus: Morula
- Subgenus: Habromorula
- Species: M. spinosa

Binomial name
- Morula spinosa (H. Adams & A. Adams, 1853)

Synonyms
- Cronia spinosa (H & A. Adams, 1853); Drupa spinosa (H. Adams & A. Adams, 1853); Habromorula spinosa (H. Adams & A. Adams, 1853); Muricidea iostomus Adams, A., 1853; Morula ambusta Dall, 1924; Pentadactylus spinosus H. Adams & A. Adams, 1853; Ricinula chrysostoma Reeve, L.A., 1846; Sistrum spinosum H. Adams & A. Adams, 1853

= Morula spinosa =

Species of gastropod

Morula (Habromorula) spinosa, the spinose rock shell, is a species of sea snail, a marine gastropod mollusc in the family Muricidae, the murex snails or rock snails.

== Description ==
The shell size varies between 14 and 40 mm (0.55 and 1.57 in).

== Distribution ==
This species is distributed in the Red Sea, in the Indian Ocean along Aldabra, Chagos, the Mascarene Basin and Tanzania; and along Japan.
