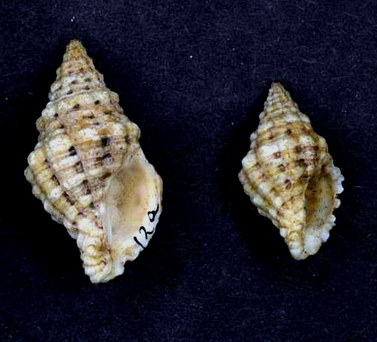
- Two shells of Muricodrupa fenestrata (museum specimens at Naturalis Biodiversity Center)

Scientific classification
- Kingdom: Animalia
- Phylum: Mollusca
- Class: Gastropoda
- Subclass: Caenogastropoda
- Order: Neogastropoda
- Family: Muricidae
- Genus: Muricodrupa
- Species: M. fenestrata

Binomial name
- Muricodrupa fenestrata (Blainville, 1832)

Synonyms
- Clathurella clathra (Lesson, 1842); Columbella clathra Lesson, 1842; Drupa (Morula) cariosa (Wood, 1828); Drupa cancellata (Quoy & Gaimard, 1833); Drupella ochrostoma (Wood, 1828); Morula cancellata (Quoy & Gaimard, 1833); Morula cariosa (Wood, 1828); Morula fenestrata (Blainville, 1832); Murex cariosus Wood, 1828 (invalid: junior homonym of Murex cariosus Linnaeus, 1767); Ocenebra fenestrata (Blainville, 1832); Purpura cancellata Quoy & Gaimard, 1833; Purpura fenestrata Blainville, 1832 (original combination); Ricinula cancellata (Quoy & Gaimard, 1833); Ricinula elongata Reeve, 1846 (sensu Blainville Reeve, 1846)

= Muricodrupa fenestrata =

Species of gastropod

Muricodrupa fenestrata is a species of sea snail, a marine gastropod mollusk in the family Muricidae, the murex snails or rock snails.

== Description ==
The shell size varies between 17 mm and 45 mm.

== Distribution ==
This species occurs in the Red Sea, in the Indian Ocean off Madagascar, Tanzania and the south coast of South Africa and in the Indo-West Pacific.
