= Lauta (gastropod) =

Scientific classification
- Kingdom: Animalia
- Phylum: Mollusca
- Class: Gastropoda
- Subclass: Caenogastropoda
- Order: Neogastropoda
- Superfamily: Muricoidea
- Family: Muricidae
- Subfamily: Ergalataxinae
- Genus: Lauta; Houart, Zuccon & Puillandre, 2019

Type species
- Ricinula parva Reeve, 1846

Genus of gastropods

Lauta is a genus of sea snails, marine gastropod mollusks in the subfamily Ergalataxinae of the family Muricidae, the murex snails or rock snails.

== Species ==
- Lauta parva (Reeve, 1846)
