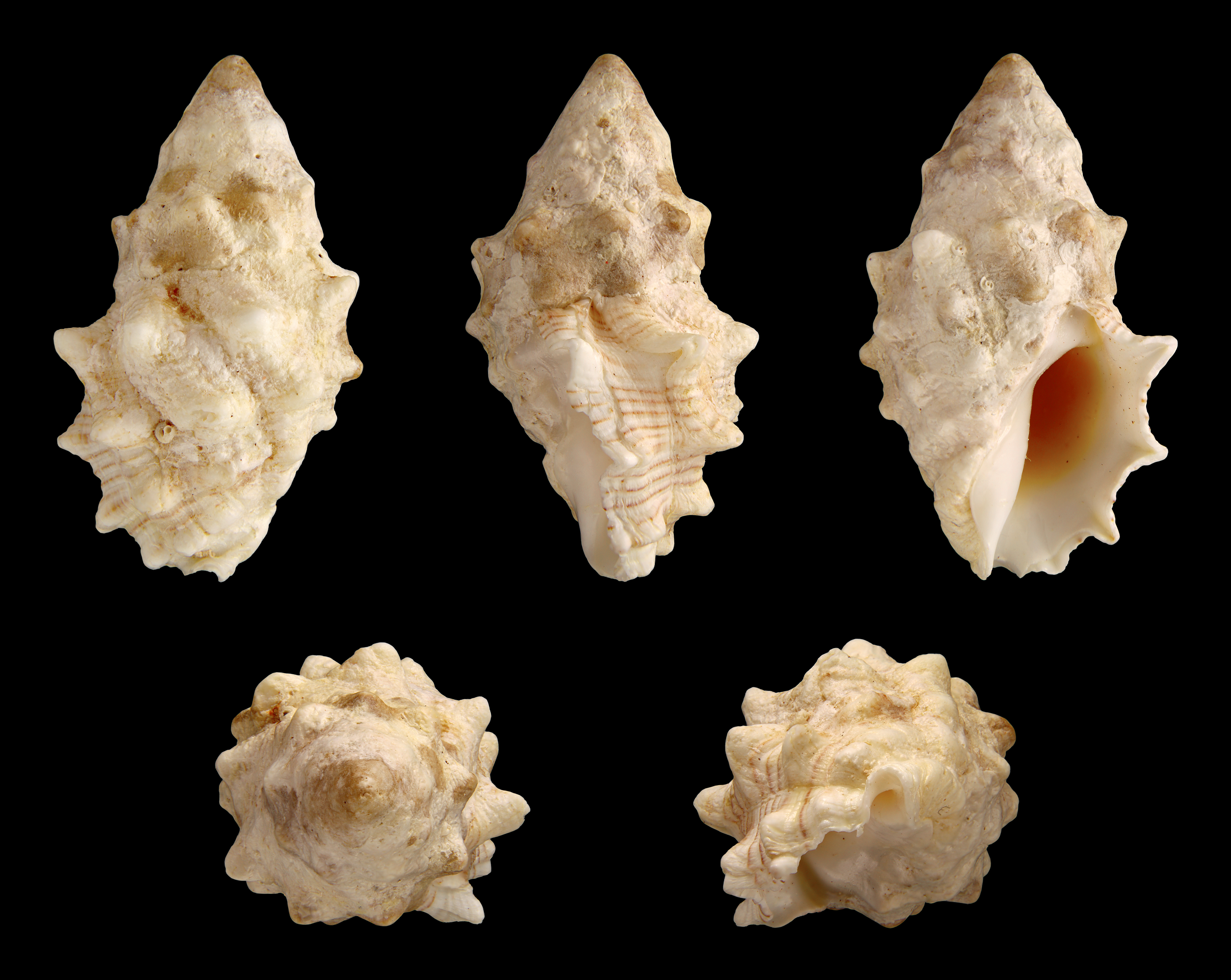

Scientific classification
- Kingdom: Animalia
- Phylum: Mollusca
- Class: Gastropoda
- Subclass: Caenogastropoda
- Order: Neogastropoda
- Family: Muricidae
- Genus: Drupella
- Species: D. cornus

Binomial name
- Drupella cornus (Röding, 1798)

Synonyms
- Drupa cornus Röding, 1798; Drupa elata (Blainville, 1832); Drupa spectrum (Reeve, 1846); Morula elata (Blainville, 1832); Purpura (Ricinula) martiniana Anton, 1839; Purpura baccata Hombron & Jacquinot, 1854; Purpura elata Blainville, 1832; Ricinula spectrum Reeve, 1846; Sistrum elatum (Blainville, 1832); Thais cornus (Röding, 1798)

= Drupella cornus =

Species of gastropod

Drupella cornus, common name: the horn drupe, is a species of sea snail, a marine gastropod mollusk in the family Muricidae, the murex snails or rock snails.

== Description ==
The shell size of an adult varies between 28 mm and 40 mm. This whitish shell shows four rows of spiny, pointed nodules with numerous smaller spines between. The oval aperture is yellow. The outer lip is with three to four teeth.

Drupella cornus lays benthic egg capsules, which hatch into free-swimming planktonic veliger larvae.

Drupella cornus is a predator of living coral, grazing on the coral tissue. An abundance of this snail can cause significant destruction to the hard-coral cover on reefs. There is a possible link between coral diseases and an outbreak of this snail. The snail is attracted to Montipora corals when these corals secrete montiporic acids.

== Habitat ==
Drupella cornus commonly occurs on or under tabular corals of the genera Acropora and Montipora or on hard substrates in the lower intertidal zone and shallow sublittoral zone. In areas where Acropora and Montipora coral are rare, D. cornus has also been known to feed on other corals such as Porites in Kenya, and Pocillopora and Porites in Hawaii.

== Distribution ==
This species is distributed in the Red Sea and in the Indian Ocean along Aldabra, Chagos, Kenya, Madagascar, the Mascarene Basin, Mozambique, Tanzania, KwaZuluNatal, Gulf of Thailand, Japan, and the Indo-Pacific.
