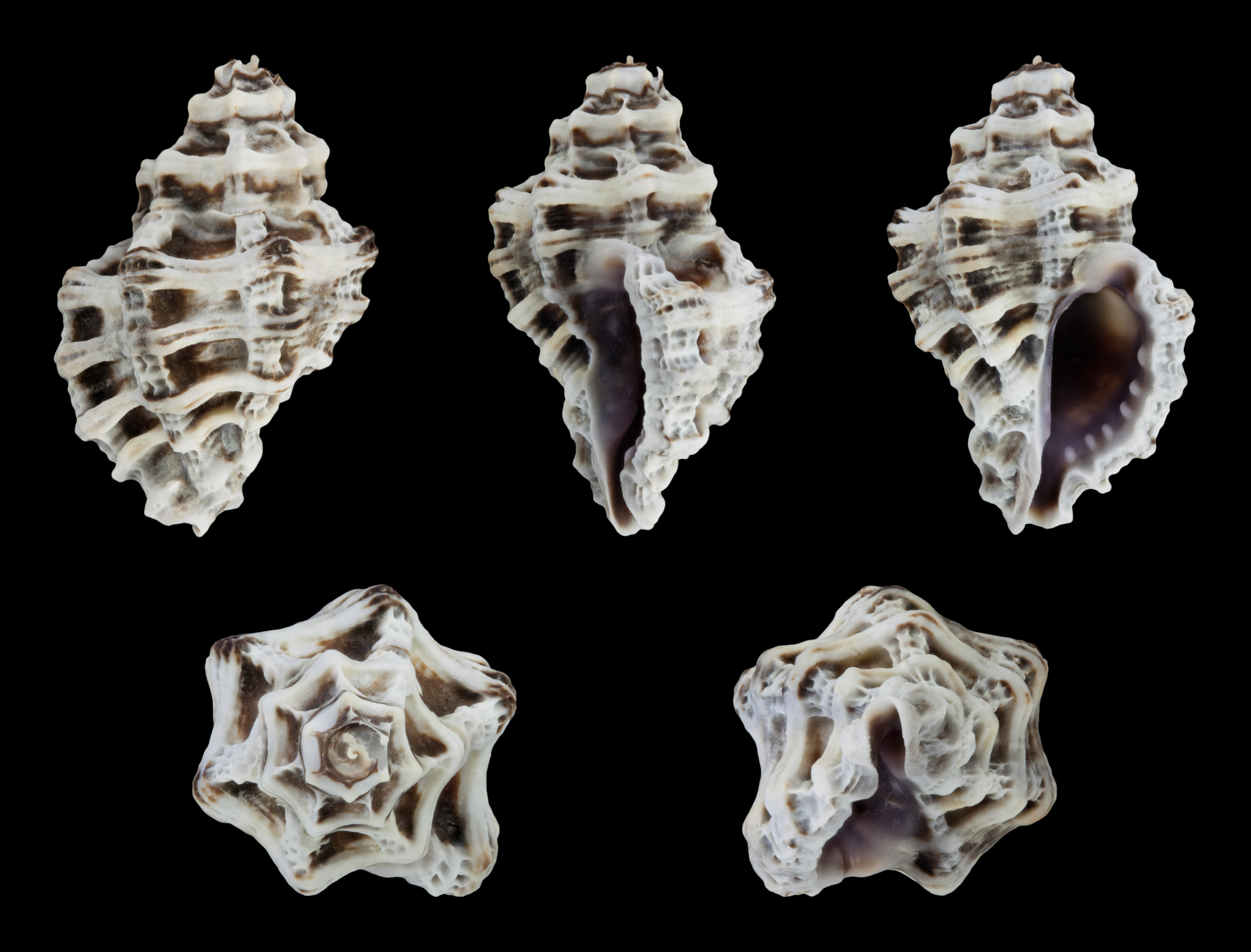
- Shell of Murichorda fiscellum

Scientific classification
- Kingdom: Animalia
- Phylum: Mollusca
- Class: Gastropoda
- Subclass: Caenogastropoda
- Order: Neogastropoda
- Family: Muricidae
- Genus: Murichorda
- Species: M. fiscellum

Binomial name
- Murichorda fiscellum (Gmelin, 1791)

Synonyms
- Coralliophila confragosa H. & A. Adams, 1864; Cronia fiscella (Gmelin, 1791); Cronia (Muricodrupa) funiculus (Wood, 1828); Drupa decussata (Reeve, 1845); Drupa fiscella (Gmelin, 1791); Morula fiscella (Gmelin, 1791); Morula (Morula) triangulata Pease, W.H., 1868; Murex (Ocinebra) fiscellum (Gmelin, 1791) (superseded combination); Murex decussatus Reeve, 1845; Murex fiscellum Gmelin, 1791 (basionym); Murex funiculus Wood, 1828; Murex iostoma Sowerby, 1834; Murex moriformis Lesson, 1844; Murex muricoides Hombron, J.B. & C.H. Jacquinot, 1854; Murex ricinuloides Quoy & Gaimard, 1833; Muricodrupa fiscellum (Gmelin, 1791); Muricodrupa stellaris Hombron, J.B. & C.H. Jacquinot in Rousseau, 1854; Purpura fiscella (Gmelin, 1791); Purpura muricoides Hombron & Jacquinot in Rousseau, 1854; Purpura nympha Duclos, 1832; Purpura pothuani Eydoux & Souleyet, 1852; Purpura stellaris Hombron & Jacquinot in Rousseau, 1854; Ricinula decussata (Reeve, 1845); Ricinula decussata (Reeve, 1845); Ricinula fiscellum; Sistrum triangulatum Pease, 1868

= Murichorda fiscellum =

Species of gastropod

Murichorda fiscellum, common name : the little basket drupe, is a species of sea snail, a marine gastropod mollusk in the family Muricidae, the murex snails or rock snails.

In 2019, taxonomists transferred the species from the genus Muricodrupa to the newly established genus Murichorda.

== Description ==
The shell size varies between 14 mm and 40 mm.

== Distribution ==
This species occurs throughout the Indo-Pacific.
