= Murichorda =

Scientific classification
- Kingdom: Animalia
- Phylum: Mollusca
- Class: Gastropoda
- Subclass: Caenogastropoda
- Order: Neogastropoda
- Superfamily: Muricoidea
- Family: Muricidae
- Subfamily: Ergalataxinae
- Genus: Murichorda; Houart, Zuccon & Puillandre, 2019

Type species
- Murex fiscellum Gmelin, 1791

Genus of gastropods

Murichorda is a genus of sea snails, marine gastropod mollusks in the subfamily Ergalataxinae of the family Muricidae, the murex snails or rock snails.

== Species ==
- Murichorda fiscellum (Gmelin, 1791)
- Murichorda jacobsoni (Emerson & D'Attilio, 1981)
- Murichorda rumphiusi (Houart, 1996)
