= Pascula palmeri =

Scientific classification
- Kingdom: Animalia
- Phylum: Mollusca
- Class: Gastropoda
- Subclass: Caenogastropoda
- Order: Neogastropoda
- Family: Muricidae
- Genus: Pascula
- Species: P. palmeri

Binomial name
- Pascula palmeri (Powell, 1967)

Synonyms
- Morula palmeri Powell, 1967

Species of gastropod

Pascula palmeri is a species of sea snail, a marine gastropod mollusk in the family Muricidae, the murex snails or rock snails.
