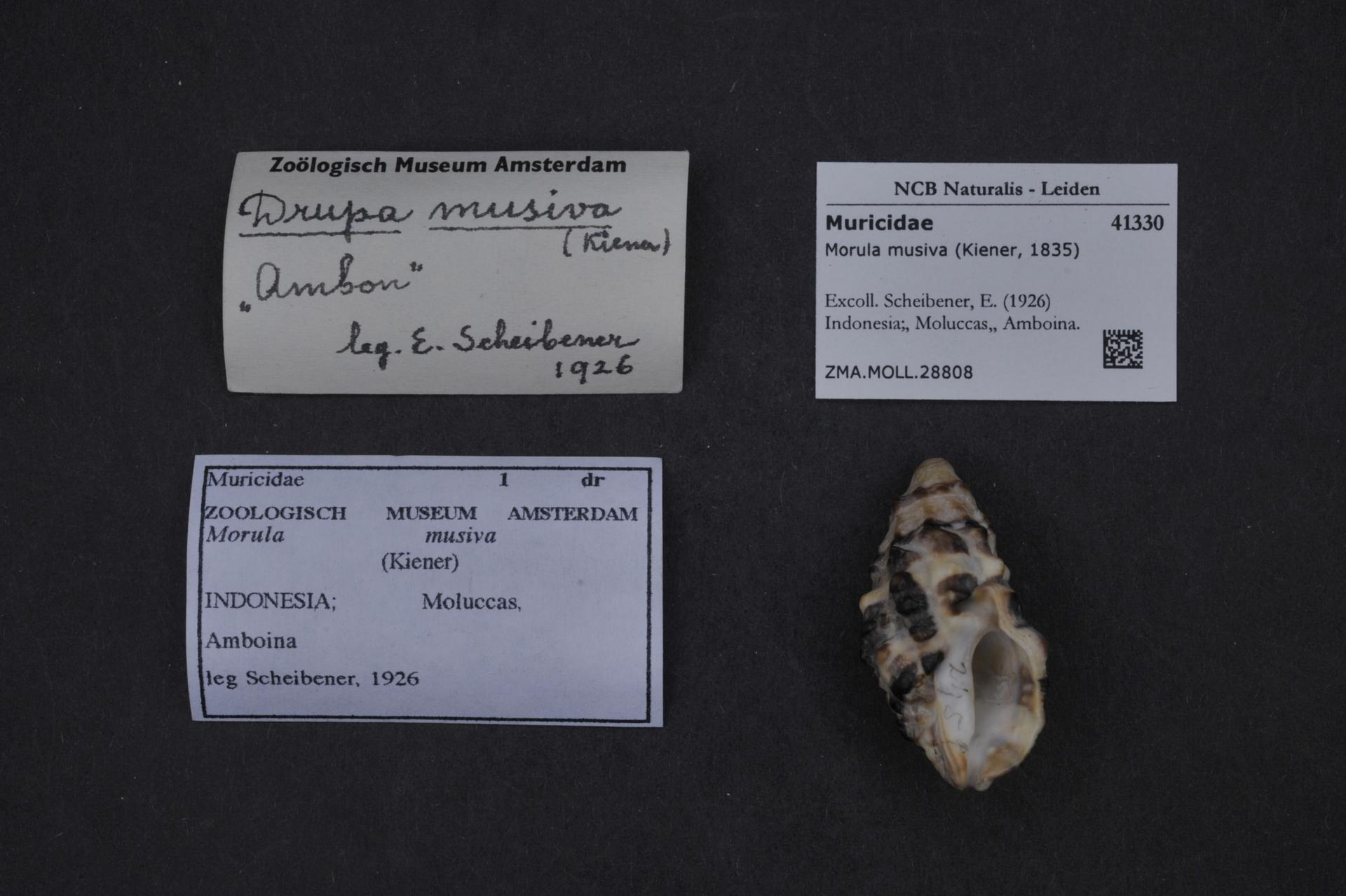

Scientific classification
- Kingdom: Animalia
- Phylum: Mollusca
- Class: Gastropoda
- Subclass: Caenogastropoda
- Order: Neogastropoda
- Family: Muricidae
- Genus: Tenguella
- Species: T. musiva

Binomial name
- Tenguella musiva (Kiener, 1835)

Synonyms
- Morula (Morula) musiva (Kiener, 1835); Purpura musiva Kiener, 1835

= Tenguella musiva =

Species of gastropod

Tenguella musiva, common names mosaic purpura, musical drupe, is a species of sea snail, a marine gastropod mollusk, in the family Muricidae, the murex snails or rock snails.
