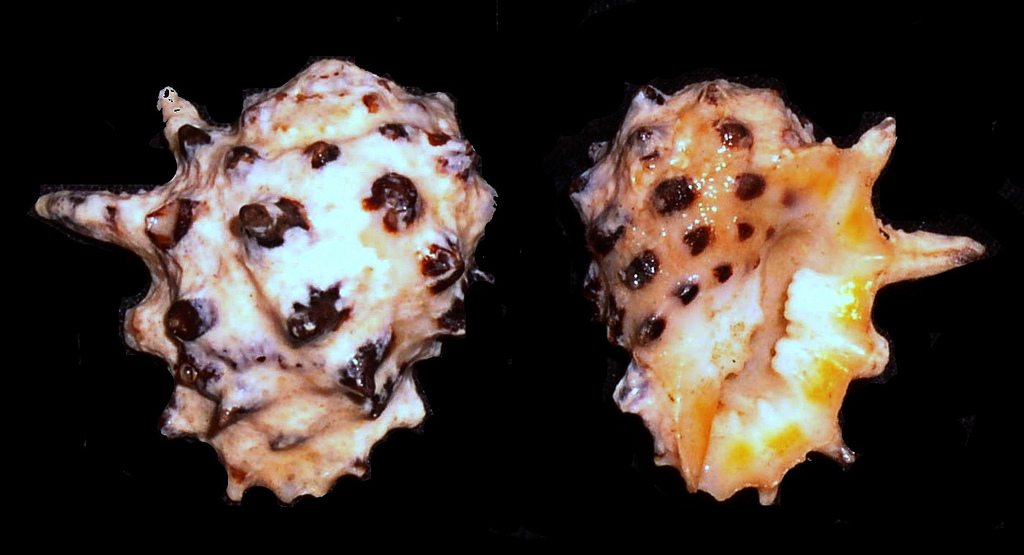
- Drupa (Drupa) ricinus

Scientific classification
- Kingdom: Animalia
- Phylum: Mollusca
- Class: Gastropoda
- Subclass: Caenogastropoda
- Order: Neogastropoda
- Family: Muricidae
- Genus: Drupa
- Species: D. ricinus

Binomial name
- Drupa ricinus (Linnaeus, 1758)

Synonyms
- Drupa (Drupa) ricinus (Linnaeus, 1758); Drupa ricina (Linnaeus, 1758); Drupa rubuscaesius Röding, 1798; Drupa tribulus Röding, 1798; Murex hystrix Linnaeus, 1758; Murex ricinus Linnaeus, 1758; Purpura hystrix Linnaeus, 1758; Ricinula arachnoides Lamarck, 1816; Ricinula hystrix (Linnaeus, 1758); Ricinula ricinus (Linnaeus, 1758); Sistrum album Montfort, 1810; Sistrum ricinus (Linnaeus, 1758)

= Drupa ricinus =

Species of sea snail

Sistrum ricinus, formerly known as Drupa ricinus and also called the prickly spotted drupe or the prickly Pacific drupe, is a species of sea snail, a marine gastropod mollusk in the family Muricidae.

== Description ==
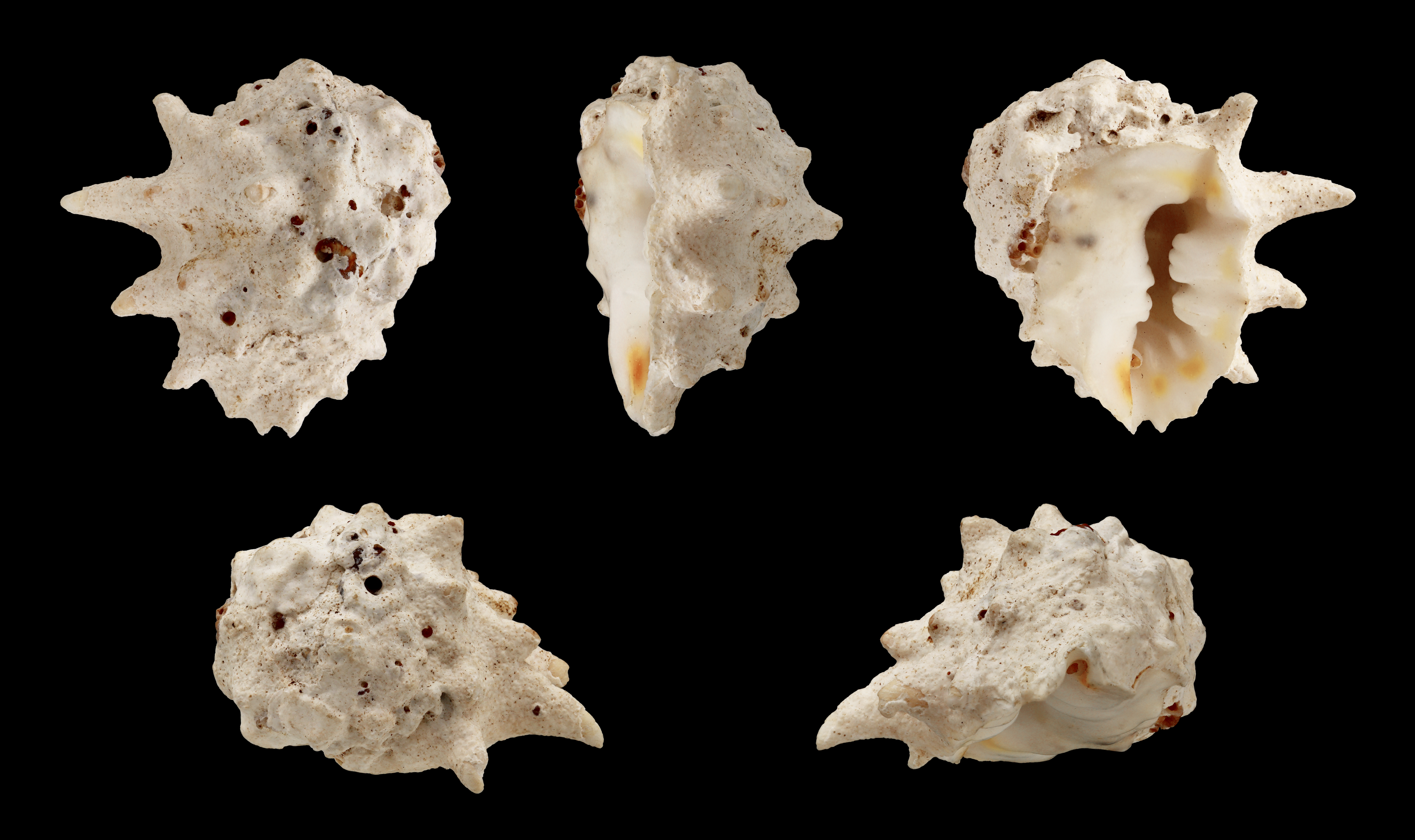
Five views of a shell of Drupa ricinus

The shell size of Sistrum ricinus ranges between 19 mm and 32 mm. It has a beautiful shell that is solid and narrow, of a dirty white color with dark brown or black nodules. It lives in the lower eulittoral, under boulders and on reef crest, and feed on worms and mollusks. These marine snails feed on barnacles, bivalves, other snails; worms and mollusks. They hunt their food by using a radula to drill a hole in their shells prey.

== Taxonomy ==
Sistrum ricinus has a widespread distribution and a high degree of range overlap with several sister species. In the course of the 19th and 20th century, a total of 8 species and subspecies were added, leaving us with a total of 12 valid taxa within the genus, these 12 taxa are divided into 3 subgenera.

== Distribution and habitat ==
This species is distributed throughout the tropical Indo-Pacific including the Galápagos Islands, Australia, Hawaii. They can be found on reef flats and rocks, above the tide lines of lagoons and inner reefs at a depth of 1-20m.
