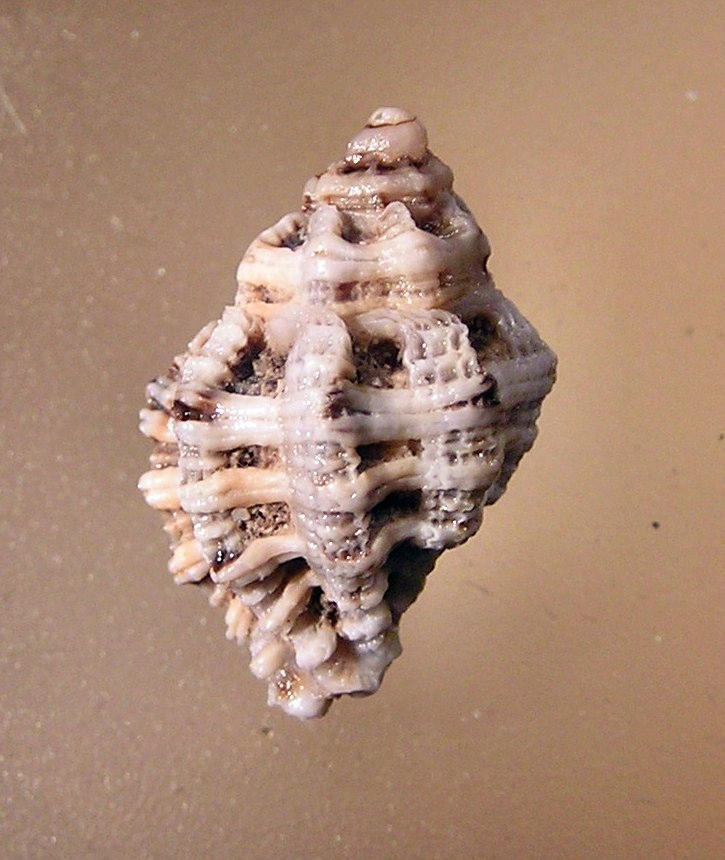
- A shell of Muricodrupa fiscella

Scientific classification
- Kingdom: Animalia
- Phylum: Mollusca
- Class: Gastropoda
- Subclass: Caenogastropoda
- Order: Neogastropoda
- Superfamily: Muricoidea
- Family: Muricidae
- Subfamily: Ergalataxinae; Kuroda, Habe & Oyama, 1971

Genera
- See text

= Ergalataxinae =

Subfamily of gastropods

Ergalataxinae is a taxonomic subfamily of small to medium-sized predatory sea snails, marine gastropod mollusks within the family Muricidae, the rock snails. In this subfamily, the aragonitic shell has 0–2 varices.

== Genera ==
The subfamily Ergalataxinae contains the following genera:

- Azumamorula Emerson, 1968 (uncertain, may be a subgenus of Morula)
- Bedevina Habe, 1946
- Claremontiella Houart, Zuccon & Puillandre, 2019
- Cronia H. Adams & A. Adams, 1853
- Cytharomorula Kuroda, 1953
- Daphnellopsis Schepman, 1913
- Drupella Thiele, 1925
- Ergalatax Iredale, 1931
- †Janssenia Landau, Harzhauser, İslamoğlu & Silva, 2013
- Lataxiena Jousseaume, 1883
- Lauta Houart, Zuccon & Puillandre, 2019
- Lindapterys Petuch, 1987
- Maculotriton Dall, 1904
- Morula Schumacher, 1817
- Murichorda Houart, Zuccon & Puillandre, 2019
- Muricodrupa Iredale, 1918
- Oppomorus Iredale, 1937
- Orania Pallary, 1900
- Pascula Dall, 1908
- Phrygiomurex Dall, 1904
- Spinidrupa Habe & Kosuge, 1966
- Tenguella Arakawa, 1965
- Trachypollia Woodring, 1928
- Usilla H. Adams & A. Adams, 1853
- Uttleya Marwick, 1934

Genera brought into synonymy

- Cumella Jousseaume, 1898: synonym of Lataxiena Jousseaume, 1883
- Habromorula Houart, 1995: synonym of Morula (Habromorula) Houart, 1995
- Morulina Dall, 1923: synonym of Morula Schumacher, 1817
- Roquesia Petuch, 2013: synonym of Colubraria Schumacher, 1817

Genera that have been treated as subgenera

- Azumamorula as Morula (Azumamorula)
- Oppomorus as Morula (Oppomorus), re-raised to genus in 2013.
- Usilla as Cronia (Usilla)

The classification into this subfamily is doubtful for the genera Daphnellopsis Schepman, 1913; Lindapterys Petuch, 1987 Maculotriton Dall, 1904; and Uttleya Marwick, 1934

== Taxonomy ==
The subfamily Ergalataxinae originally contained just four species: Bedevina birileffi, Ergalatax contracta, E. tokugawai, and Cytharomorula vexillum. Later, genera Morula, Spinidrupa, Cronia, and Drupella were transferred from the Rapaninae (also called Thaidinae). New species have been described, and genera split, leading to a subfamily of approximately 150 species in 20+ genera.

=== Molecular phylogeny ===
Gene-sequence analysis of four genes (cytochrome c oxidase subunit I, and three ribosomal RNA) from 52 Ergalataxine species showed three major clades, with four suprageneric sub-clades in the last:

- Clade A: Tenguella, Muricodrupa, Claremontiella
- Clade B: Morula (sensu stricto), Murichorda
- Clade C: Phrygiomurex, and:
  - Clade W: Lataxiena, Usilla, some Orania
  - Clade X: Drupella; Cronia, Maculotriton, Ergalatax
  - Clade Y: Oppomorus; Spinidrupa, Bedevina
  - Clade Z: Cytharomorula, some Orania, Pascula, Lauta

Genetic material from Azumamorula, Daphnellopsis, Lindapterys, and Uttleya was not included. Genus names above reflect later changes, such as Lauta parva for "Morula" parva, Claremontiella nodulosa for "Morula" nodulosa, and Murichorda for "Muricodrupa" fiscella and "Morula" rumphiusi.

Cronia, Maculotriton, and Ergalatax may prove to be a single species, in which case the name Cronia would have precedence. If Ergalatax is subsumed into Cronia, this would impact the name of the Ergalataxinae. Most Spinidrupa grouped with Bedevina (which has priority), but the type species S. euracantha was more basal to clade Y (only 12S rRNA sequence was available for the latter). Orania is polyphyletic, but its type species was not included.
