= List of molluscs of the Houtman Abrolhos =

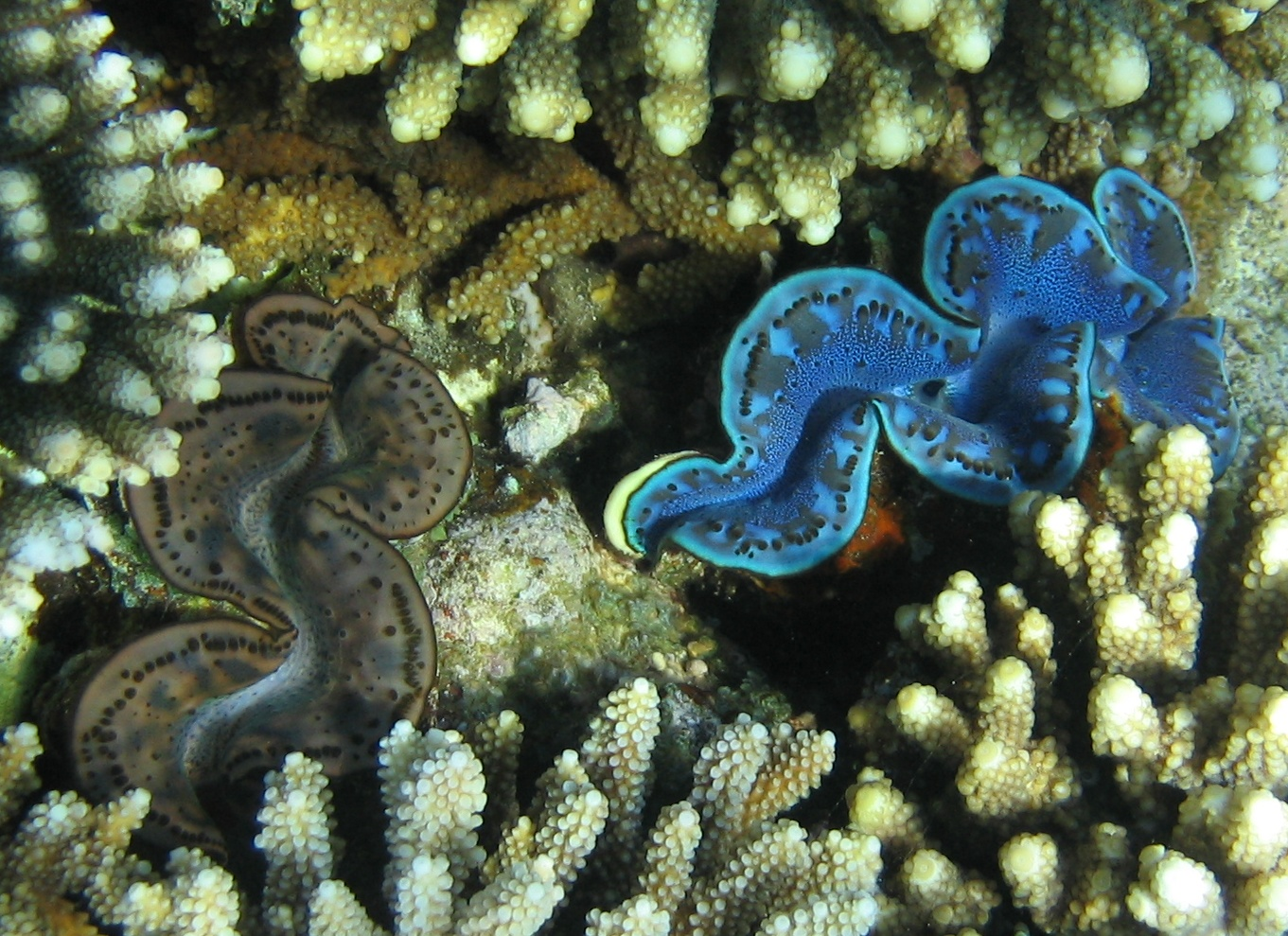
The maxima clam (Tridacna maxima), seen here at the Virgin Islands, occurs at the Houtman Abrolhos

This list of molluscs of the Houtman Abrolhos includes 492 species of marine molluscs which have been recorded from the waters of the Houtman Abrolhos, an island group in the Indian Ocean off the coast of Western Australia.

These molluscs are predominantly gastropods (346 species, 70%) and bivalves (124, 25%); the remaining 5% of species consist of cephalopods (14 species), chitons (5 species) and scaphopods (4 species).

About two thirds of the species have a tropical distribution, temperate species account for 20%, and the remaining 11% are endemic to Western Australia.

== Gastropoda ==
Acmaeidae

- Collisellis onychitis
- Patelloida alticostata
- Patelloida nigrosulcata
- Patelloida profunda calamus

Neritidae

- Nerita albicilla
- Nerita atramentosa
- Nerita plicata

Haliotidae

- Haliotis elegans
- Haliotis semiplicata

Fissurellidae

- Amblychilepas oblonga
- Cosmetalepas concatenata
- Diodora ticaonica
- Emarginula cf. clypeus
- Macroschisma munita
- Tugali cicatricosa

Trochidae

- Angaria tyria
- Astele multigranum
- Austrocochlea concamerata
- Austrocochlea constricta
- Calliostoma similarae
- Calthalotia mundula
- Cantharidus pulcherrimus
- Chloridiloma zeus
- Clanculus denticulatus
- Clanculus eucheloides
- Ethminolia vitiliginea
- Euchelus aspersus
- Euchelus atratus
- Euchelus dampieriensis
- Euchelus cf. lischkei
- Euchelus vixumbilicata
- Jujubinus cf. crenelliferus
- Microtis cf. tuberculata
- Monilea callifera
- Monilea lentiginosa
- Monodonta constricta
- Prothalotia lehmanni
- Stomatella impertusa
- Pseudostomatella papyracea
- Talopena vernicosa
- Tectus pyramis
- Thalotia chlorostoma
- Thalotia flindersi
- Trochus hanleyanus
- Trochus maculatus
- Umbonium pulchella

Turbinidae

- Austroliotia pulcherrima
- Astralium tentorium
- Liotina peronii
- Phasianella australis (Australian pheasant snail)
- Phasianella ventricosa
- Turbo intercostalis
- Turbo gruneri
- Turbo jourdani
- Turbo pulcher

Turritellidae

- Archimediella cf. maculata

Cerithiidae

- Bittium granarium
- Cerithium columna
- Cerithium echinatum
- Cerithium novaehollandiae
- Cerithium punctatum
- Cerithium tenellum
- Cerithium tenuifilosum
- Cerithium torresi
- Hypotrochus monachus
- Rhinoclavis bituberculata
- Rhinoclavis fasciata
- Rhinoclavis vertagus
- Royella sinon

Planaxidae

- Planaxis sulcatus

Littorinidae

- Bembicium auratum
- Bembicium vittatum
- Littoraria undulata
- Littoraria unifasciata
- Nodilittorina australis
- Nodilittorina nodosa

Hydrococcidae

- Hydrococcus brazieri

Strombidae

- Strombus mutabilis
- Strombus campbelli
- Strombus vomer
- Terebellum terebellum

Hipponicidae

- Hipponix conicus
- Hipponix foliaceus

Calyptraeidae

- Crepidula aculeata

Vermetidae

- Serpulorbis sipho

Siliquariidae

- Stephopoma abrolhosense

Cypraeidae

- Cypraea annulus
- Cypraea caputserpentis
- Cypraea carneola
- Cypraea caurica
- Cypraea cernica
- Cypraea clandestina
- Cypraea cribraria
- Cypraea erosa
- Cypraea helvola
- Cypraea hirundo
- Cypraea histrio
- Cypraea isabella
- Cypraea limacina
- Cypraea lynx
- Cypraea marginalis
- Cypraea moneta (Money cowry)
- Cypraea ovum
- Cypraea reevei
- Cypraea stolida
- Cypraea teres
- Cypraea tigris
- Cypraea venusta
- Cypraea vitellus

Ovulidae

- Prionovula cavanaghi
- Primovula rutherfordiana

Triviidae

- Trivia merces

Naticidae

- Eunaticina linnaeana
- Natica euzona
- Natica gualtierana
- Natica sagittata
- Natica powisiana
- Natica seychellium
- Polinices melanostoma

Bursidae

- Bursa granularis
- Tutufa rubeta

Cassidae

- Cassis fimbriata
- Phalium bandatum
- Semicassis whitworthi

Ranellidae

- Charonia lampas
- Charonia tritonis (Triton's trumpet)
- Cymatium mundum
- Cymatium nicobaricum
- Cymatium parthenopeum
- Ranella australasia
- Septa tabulata

Tonnidae

- Malea pomum
- Tonna canaliculata
- Tonna cepa
- Tonna chinensis
- Tonna perdix
- Tonna variegata

Epitoniidae

- Cirsotrema varicosa

Janthinidae

- Janthina janthina

Muricidae

- Chicoreus cornucervi
- Cronia avellana
- Cronia crassulnata
- Drupa cf. fusconigra
- Drupa ricinus
- Drupa lobata
- Drupa rubusidaeus
- Drupa morum
- Drupella cornus
- Favaria planilirata
- Hexaplex stainforthi
- Morula spinosa
- Morula granulata
- Morula uva
- Nassa francolina
- Pterynotus undosus
- Thais echinata
- Thais orbita
- Coralliophila costularis
- Coralliophila radula
- Coralliophila neritoidea

Turbinellidae

- Syrinx aruanus
- Tudivasum inermis

Buccinidae

- Caducifer ignea
- Caducifer truncata
- Cantharus erythrostomus
- Cantharus undosus
- Engina incarnata
- Nassarius albinus
- Nassarius gaudiosus
- Nassarius glans
- Nassarius pauperatus
- Nassarius pauperus
- Nassarius reeveanus
- Nassarius rufula
- Phos senticosus
- Phos sculptilis
- Pisania ignea
- Dolicholatirus spiceri
- Fusinus colus
- Latirus amplustris
- Latirus turritus

Columbellidae

- Mitrella lincolnensis
- Mitrella menkeana
- Mitrella venulata
- Pyrene bidentata
- Pyrene flava
- Pyrene punctata
- Pyrene testudinaria
- Pyrene turturina

Volutidae

- Cottonia nodiplicata
- Melo miltonis (Southern bailer)
- Amoria damonii
- Aulicina irvinae
- Aulicina nivosa
- Notovoluta baconi
- Paramoria weaveri

Olividae

- Oliva australis
- Oliva caerulea

Mitridae

- Imbricaria conovula
- Imbricaria punctata
- Mitra atjehensis
- Mitra carbonaria
- Mitra chalybeia
- Mitra fraga
- Mitra gilbertsoni
- Mitra mitra
- Mitra rosacea
- Mitra scutulata
- Mitra sowerbyi melvilli
- Mitra ticaonica

Costellariidae

- Costellaria cf. apicitinctum
- Vexillum marrowi
- Vexillum festum
- Vexillum zebuense

Cancellariidae

- Tudicula inermis

Turridae

- Asperdaphne sp.
- Etrema sp.
- Hemidaphne rissoides
- Gemmula dampieriana
- Inquisitor odhneri
- Ptychobela flavidula
- Ptychobela nodulosa
- Turridrupa cerithina
- Xenuroturris cingulifera

Conidae

- Conus anemone
- Conus capitaneus
- Conus ceylanensis
- Conus chaldaeus
- Conus dorreensis
- Conus ebraeus
- Conus geographus
- Conus gabelishi
- Conus klemae
- Conus lischkeanus - syn. Conus kermadecensis
- Conus lividus
- Conus miles
- Conus miliaris
- Conus nodulosus
- Conus reductaspiralis
- Conus sponsalis
- Conus suturatus
- Conus vexillum
- Conus victoriae

Terebridae

- Duplicaria bernardi
- Duplicaria duplicata
- Terebra affinis
- Terebra crenulata
- Terebra funiculata
- Terebra nebulosa
- Terebra triseriata
- Terebra textilis

Pyramidellidae

- Pyramidella sp.

Bullinidae

- Bullina lineata

Acteonidae

- Pupa solidula
- Pupa sulcata

Haminoeidae

- Cylichna arachis

Hydatinidae

- Hydatina physis
- Hydatina amplustre

Philinidae

- Philine sp.

Bullidae

- Bulla ampulla
- Bulla quoyii (Brown bubble snail)

Atyidae

- Atys cylindricus

Aglajidae

- Chelidonura hirundinina
- Chelidonura pallida
- Chelidonura cf. sandrana
- Chelidonura tsurugensis
- Chelidonura amoena
- Philinopsis cf. gardneri

Akeridae

- Akera soluta

Aplysiidae

- Aplysia dactylomela
- Aplysia denisoni
- Aplysia gigantea
- Aplysia oculifera
- Aplysia parvula
- Aplysia reticulatra
- Dolabella auricularia
- Dolabrifera persartensis
- Notarchus indicus
- Siphonota geographica
- Stylochelius longicauda

Tylodinidae

- Tylodina corticalis

Umbraculidae

- Umbraculum sinicum

Pleurobranchidae

- Berthellina citrina
- Pleurobranchus cf. forskalii
- Pleurobranchus hilli
- Pleurobranchus peroni

Volvatellidae

- Volvatella australis
- Volvatella ventricosa
- Volvatella cf. candida

Juliidae

- Berthelinia darwini

Oxynoidae

- Oxynoe viridis

Placobranchidae

- Elysia australis
- Elysia expansa
- Elysia maoria
- Elysia tomentosa
- Elysia thompsoni
- Elysiella pusilla

Limapontiidae

- Stiliger aureomarginatus

Polyceridae

- Limacia sp.
- Nembrotha purpureolineata
- Plocamopherus cf. tilesii
- Plocamopherus cf. maculatus
- Crimora lutea

Gymnodoridae

- Gymnodoris sp.
- Gymnodoris sp.
- Gymnodoris sp.
- Gymnodoris sp.
- Paliolla sp.

Aegiridae

- Notodoris citrina
- Aegires villosus

Hexabranchidae

- Hexabranchus sanguineus (Spanish dancer)

Dorididae

- Alliodoris hedleyi
- Asteronotus cespitosus
- Asteronotus fuscus
- Aphelodoris cf. affinis
- Discodoris concinna
- Discodoris fragilis
- Halgerda punctata
- Halgerda tessellata
- Platydoris formosa
- Trippa spongiosa
- cf. Jorunna sp.

Chromodorididae

- Chromodoris cf. africana
- Chromodoris westraliensis
- Chromodoris rufomarginata
- Chromodoris cf. tinctoria
- Chromodoris fidelis
- Chromodoris elisabethina
- Glossodoris atromarginata
- Mexichromis macropus
- Hypselodoris maculosa
- cf. Noumea sp.
- Ceratosoma trilobatum

Dendrodorididae

- Dendrodoris denisoni
- Dendrodoris nigra

Phyllidiidae

- Phyllidia coelestis
- Phyllidia pustulosa
- Phyllidia varicosa

Flabellinidae

- Flabellina bicolor

Glaucidae

- Godiva sp.
- Limenandra nodsa

Tritoniidae

- Marionopsis dakini
- Tritonia cf. alba

Bornellidae

- Bornella stellifer

Scyllaeidae

- Scyllaea pelagica

Tethyidae

- Melibe australis
- Melibe mirifica

Siphonariidae

- Sypharia sp.

== Bivalvia ==
Nuculanidae

- Nuculana verconis

Solemyidae

- Solemya australis

Arcidae

- Acar plicata
- Barbatia foliata
- Barbatia pistachia
- Barbatia parva
- Striarca sp.

Limopsidae

- Limopsis belcheri
- Limopsis multistriata

Glycymerididae

- Glycymeris setiger
- Glycymeris persimilis
- Tucetona angusticosta
- Tucetona auriflua

Mytilidae

- Leiosolenus hanleyanus
- Lithophaga nasuta
- Lithophaga teres
- Modiolus auriculatus
- Musculus glaberrima
- Musculista glaberrima
- Septifer bilocularis

Pinnidae

- Pinna bicolor
- Pinna muricata

Pteriidae

- Pterelectroma sp.
- Pterelectroma zebra
- Pinctada albina
- Pinctada margaritifera
- Pteria lata

Isognomonidae

- Crenulata picta
- Electroma georgiana
- Isognomon legumen

Vulsellidae

- Malleus meridionalis
- Malleus albus
- Vulsella spongarium

Pectinidae

- Annachlamis sp.
- Amusium balloti
- Chlamys atkinos
- Chlamys australis
- Chlamys funebris
- Chlamys squamata
- Chlamys squamosa
- Decatopecten strangei
- Gloripallium pallium
- Hemipecten forbesianus
- Pecten fumatus

Spondylidae

- Spondulus barbatus
- Spondulus cf. exilis
- Spondulus microlepos

Anomiidae

- Anomia sp.

Limidae

- Lima cf. fragilis
- Lima nimbifer
- Lima parafragile
- Lima strangei
- Lima lima vulgaris
- Limatula siligo

Plicatulidae

- Plicatula plicata

Gryphaeidae

- Hyotissa hyotis
- Hyotissa sp.

Ostreidae

- Alectryonella crenulifera
- Lopho cristigalii
- Ostrea deformis
- Ostrea folium
- Saccostrea cucullata

Trigoniidae

- Neotrigonia bednalli
- Neotrigonia uniophora

Lucinidae

- Bellucina cf. semperianum
- Callucina lacteola
- Ctena bella
- Phacoides sp.
- Rastafaria thiophila
- Wallucina assimilis

Chamidae

- Chama cf. limbula
- Chama pacifica
- Chama ruderalis

Carditidae

- Megacardita incrassata
- Vimentum dilectum

Crassatellidae

- Eucrassatella pulchra
- Talabarica ziczac

Cardiidae

- Acrosterigma alternatum
- Acrosterigma marielae
- Acrosterigma reeveanum
- Acrosterigma rosemariensis
- Acrosterigma vlamingi
- Ctenocardium fornicata
- Ctenocardium perornata
- Fulvia aperta
- Fragum erugatum
- Fragum retusum
- Lunulicardia retusa
- Lyrocardium lyratum

Tridacnidae

- Tridacna maxima (Maxima clam)

Mactridae

- Mactra incarnata
- Mactra pura

Mesodesmatidae

- Paphies heterodon

Tellinidae

- Arcopagia victoriae
- Clathrotellina carnicolor
- Fabulina sp.
- Loxoglypta clathrata
- Macromona dispar
- Tellina perna
- Tellina rastellum
- Tellina cf. verrucosa

Veneridae

- Callista sp.
- Callista planatella
- Circe plicatina
- Circe scripta
- Circe sulcata
- Dosinia deshayesi
- Paphia semirugata
- Paphia crassisulca
- Paphies sulcosa
- Placamen flindersi
- Placamen gravescens
- Tapes literatus
- Tawera lagopus
- Timoclea cardioides
- Timoclea recognita
- Venus lamellaris
- Venus toreuma

Corbulidae

- Corbula cf. tunicata

Gastrochaenidae

- Gastrochaena cf. cuneiformis
- Cucurbitula cymbium

Hiatellidae

- Hiatella australis

Clavagellidae

- Bechites sp.

== Cephalopoda ==
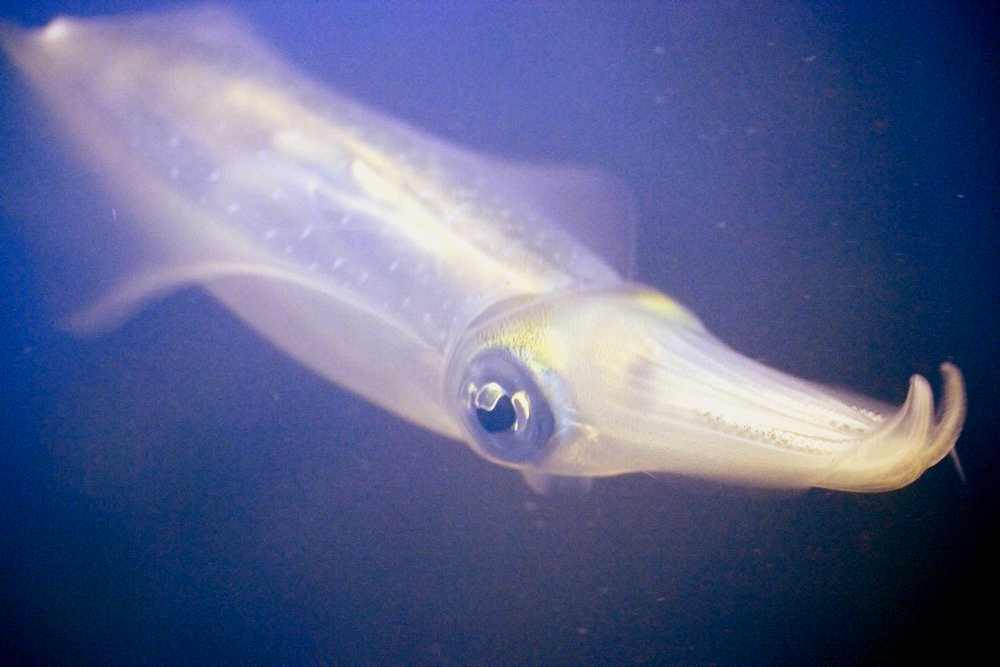
Sepioteuthis lessoniana

Spirulidae

- Spirula spirula (Ram's horn squid)

Sepiidae

- Sepia chirotrema
- Sepia cultrata
- Sepia irvingi
- Sepia novaehollandiae
- Sepia papuensis
- Sepia apama (Australian giant cuttlefish)

Sepiadariidae

- Sepioloidea lineolata

Sepiolidae

- Euprymna tasmanica (Southern dumpling squid)

Loliginidae

- Loligo chinensis
- Sepioteuthis lessoniana

Octopodidae

- Hapalochlaena cf. maculosa (Southern blue-ringed octopus)
- Hapalochlaena lunulata (Greater blue-ringed octopus)
- Octopus flindersi

== Polyplacophora ==
Ischnochitonidae

- Ischnochiton cariosus
- Ischnochiton sp.

Cryptoplacidae

- Cryptoplax hartmeyeri
- Cryptoplax striata

Chitonidae

- Onithochiton quercina

== Scaphopoda ==
Dentaliidae

- Dentalium elephantinum
- Dentalium formosum
- Dentalium bisexangulatum

Solecurtidae

- Solecurtus sulcatus

== See also ==
- List of marine molluscs of Australia
