= Paramoria johnclarki =

Scientific classification
- Kingdom: Animalia
- Phylum: Mollusca
- Class: Gastropoda
- Subclass: Caenogastropoda
- Order: Neogastropoda
- Family: Volutidae
- Genus: Paramoria
- Species: P. johnclarki

Binomial name
- Paramoria johnclarki Bail & Limpus, 1997

Species of gastropod

Paramoria johnclarki is a species of sea snail, a marine gastropod mollusk in the family Volutidae, the volutes.

== Description ==
Shell size 40-45 mm.

== Distribution ==
South coast of Western Australia.
