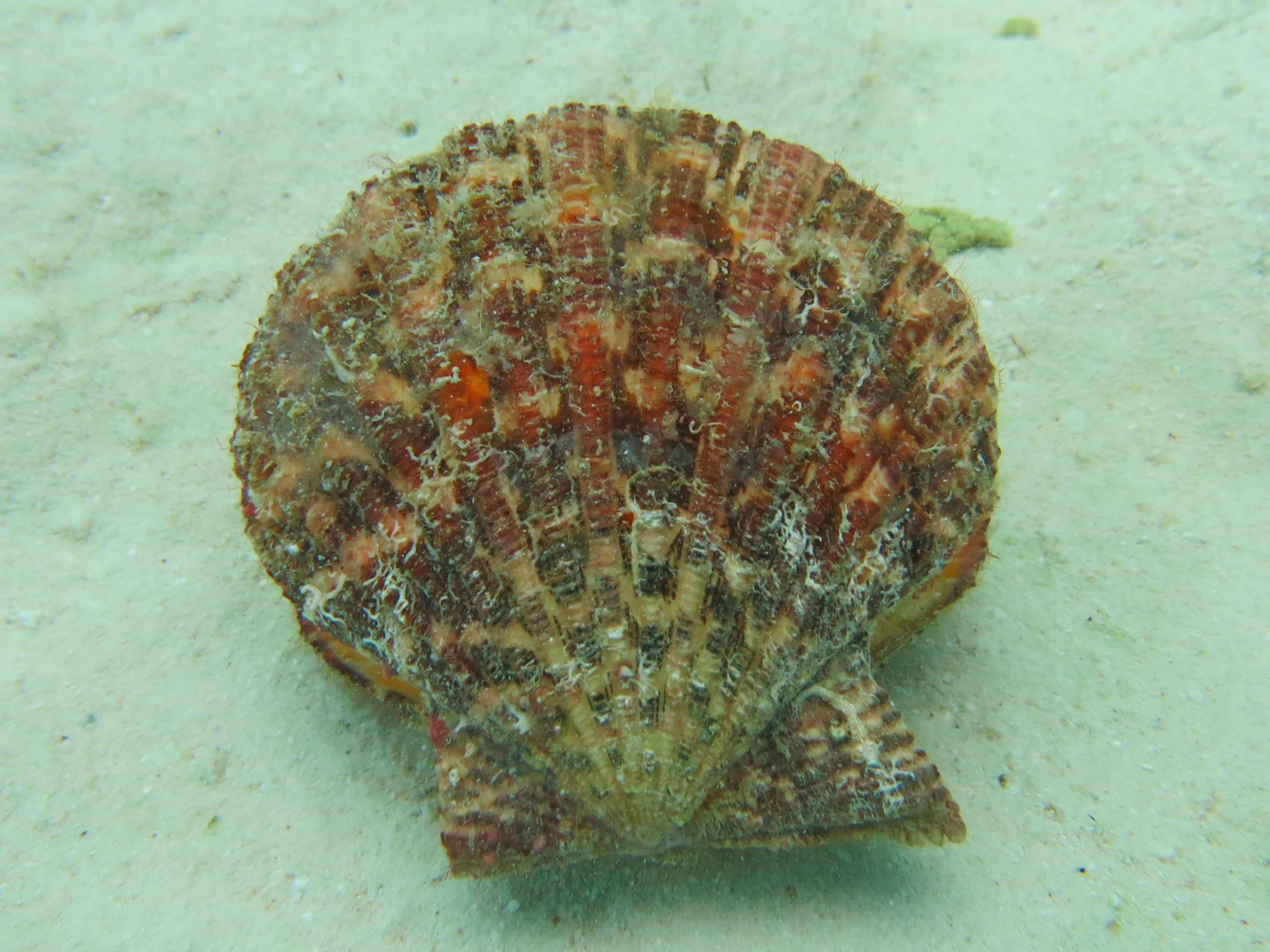
- Gloripallium pallium

Scientific classification
- Domain: Eukaryota
- Kingdom: Animalia
- Phylum: Mollusca
- Class: Bivalvia
- Order: Pectinida
- Family: Pectinidae
- Genus: Gloripallium; Iredale, 1939

= Gloripallium =

Genus of bivalves

Gloripallium is a genus of bivalves belonging to the family Pectinidae.

The species of this genus are found in Indian and Pacific Ocean.

Species:

- Gloripallium maculosum (Forsskål, 1775)
- Gloripallium pallium (Linnaeus, 1758)
- Gloripallium speciosum (Reeve, 1853)
- Gloripallium spiniferum (I.Sowerby, 1835)
