= Paramoria =

Scientific classification
- Kingdom: Animalia
- Phylum: Mollusca
- Class: Gastropoda
- Subclass: Caenogastropoda
- Order: Neogastropoda
- Family: Volutidae
- Subfamily: Amoriinae
- Genus: Paramoria; McMichael 1960

Genus of gastropods

Paramoria is a genus of sea snails, marine gastropod mollusks in the family Volutidae.

== Species ==
Species within the genus Paramoria include:

- Paramoria guntheri (Smith, 1886)
- Paramoria johnclarki Bail & Limpus, 1997
- Paramoria weaveri McMichael, 1961
