= Paramoria guntheri =

Scientific classification
- Kingdom: Animalia
- Phylum: Mollusca
- Class: Gastropoda
- Subclass: Caenogastropoda
- Order: Neogastropoda
- Family: Volutidae
- Genus: Paramoria
- Species: P. guntheri

Binomial name
- Paramoria guntheri (Smith, 1886)

Synonyms
- Voluta adcocki Tate, 1889

Species of gastropod

Paramoria guntheri is a species of sea snail, a marine gastropod mollusk in the family Volutidae, the volutes.
