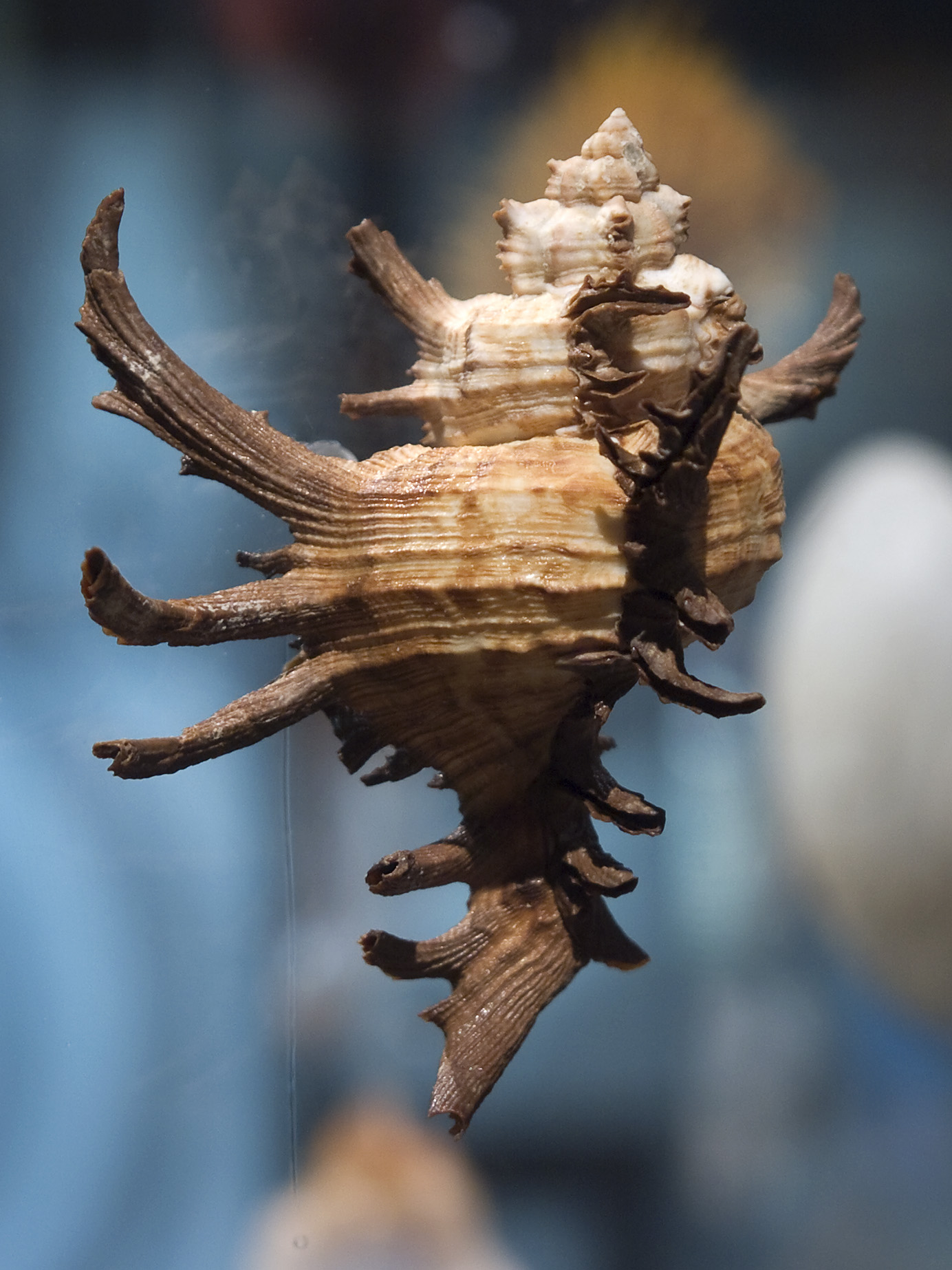
- A shell of the staghorn murex, Chicoreus cornucervi

Scientific classification
- Kingdom: Animalia
- Phylum: Mollusca
- Class: Gastropoda
- Subclass: Caenogastropoda
- Order: Neogastropoda
- Family: Muricidae
- Genus: Chicoreus
- Species: C. cornucervi

Binomial name
- Chicoreus cornucervi (Röding, 1798)

Synonyms
- Murex aranea Blainville in Kiener, 1822; Murex monodon Sowerby, 1825; Purpura cornucervi Röding, 1798

= Chicoreus cornucervi =

Species of gastropod

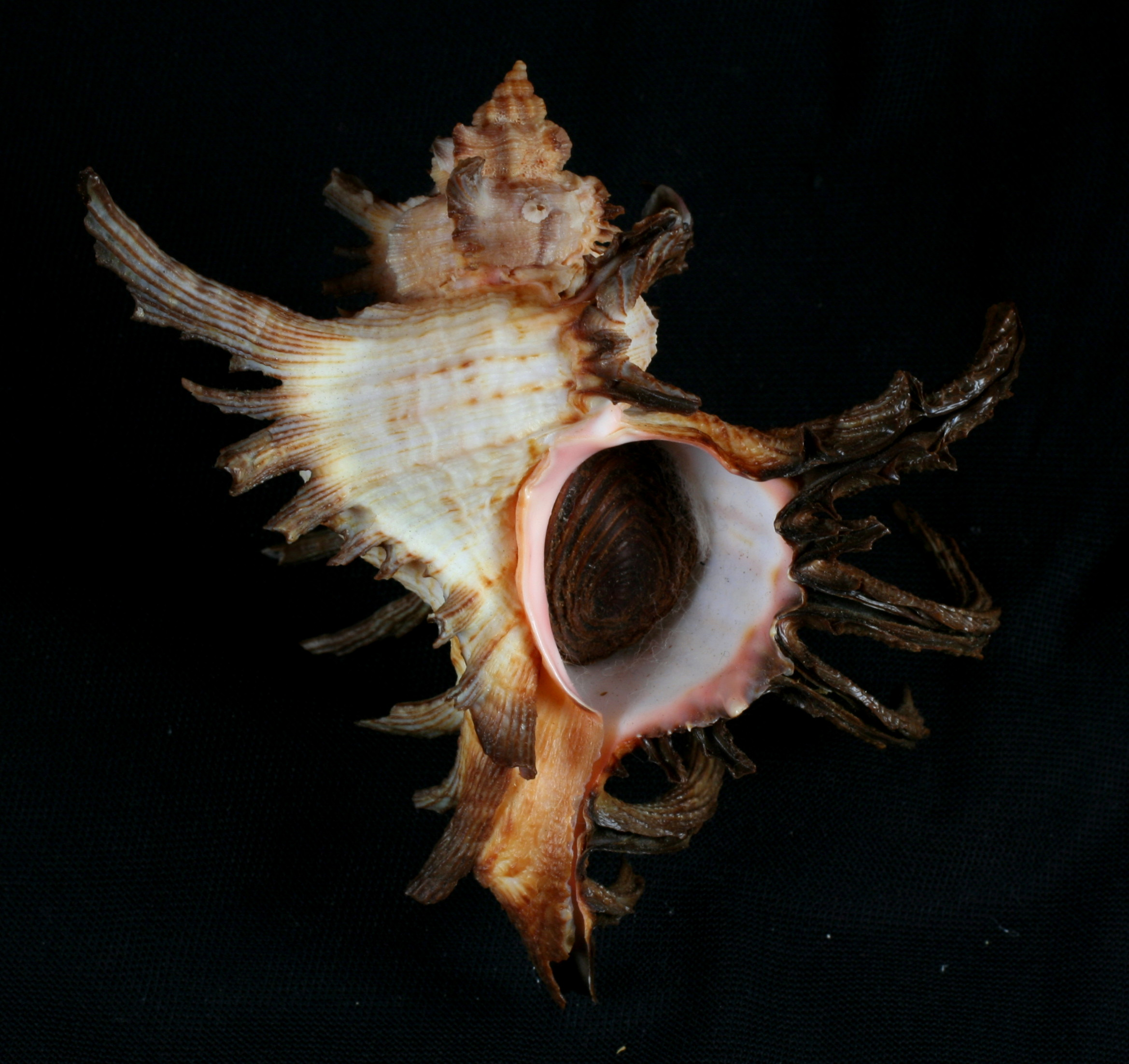
Shell of Chicoreus cornucervi (Röding, 1798), with operculum measuring 101.4 mm in height, collected at low tide in rocky crevice at One Arm Point, in Broome, Australia.

Chicoreus (Chicoreus) cornucervi, common name staghorn murex or toothed murex, is a species of sea snail, a marine gastropod mollusk in the family Muricidae, the rock snails or murex snails.

== Description ==
The shell size varies between 50 mm and 148 mm.

== Distribution ==
This species is distributed along Northwest Australia and Western Papua New Guinea.
