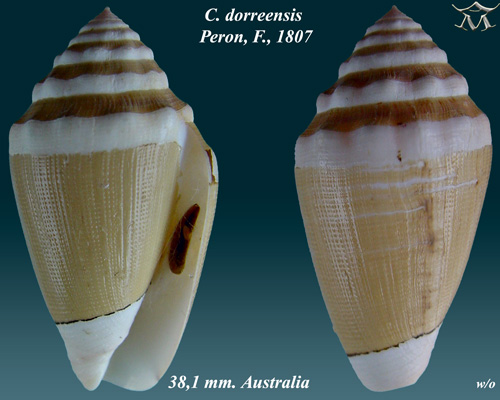
- Apertural and abapertural views of shell of Conus dorreensis Peron, F., 1807
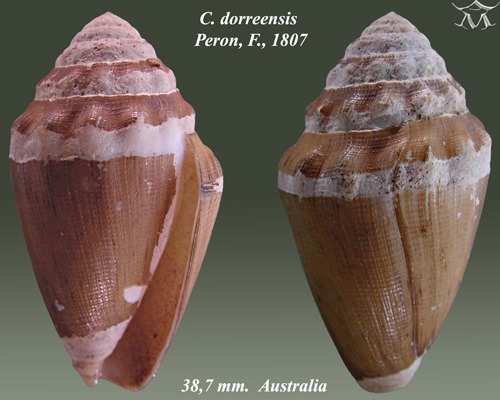

Conservation status
- Least Concern (IUCN 3.1)

Scientific classification
- Kingdom: Animalia
- Phylum: Mollusca
- Class: Gastropoda
- Subclass: Caenogastropoda
- Order: Neogastropoda
- Superfamily: Conoidea
- Family: Conidae
- Genus: Conus
- Species: C. dorreensis

Binomial name
- Conus dorreensis Péron, 1807

Synonyms
- Conus (Virroconus) dorreensis Péron, 1807; Conus pontificalis Lamarck, 1810; Dyraspis dorreensis (Péron, 1807)

= Conus dorreensis =

Species of sea snail

Conus dorreensis, common name the pontifical cone, is a species of sea snail, a marine gastropod mollusk in the family Conidae, the cone snails and their allies.

Like all species within the genus Conus, these snails are predatory and venomous. Live ones can sting humans, so should be handled carefully or not at all.

== Description ==
The size of the shell varies between 11 mm and 48 mm. The spire is convexly elevated and tuberculated. The whole surface is covered by very fine minutely punctured revolving lines. The epidermis is yellowish olive, very thin, usually persistent in a very broadband upon the body whorl, but absent from the narrow shoulder and basal bands, which, with the spire, are white.

== Distribution ==
This marine species is endemic to Australia and occurs off Western Australia.
