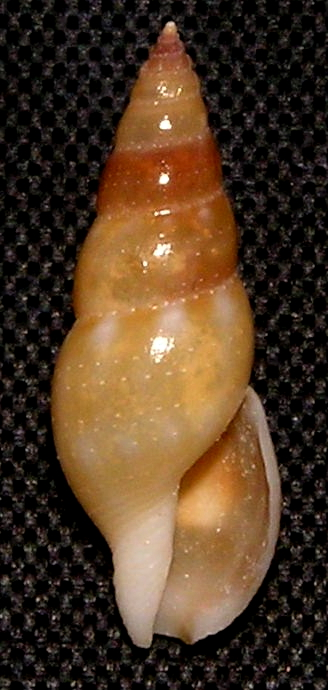
- Shell of Daphnella rissoides

Scientific classification
- Kingdom: Animalia
- Phylum: Mollusca
- Class: Gastropoda
- Subclass: Caenogastropoda
- Order: Neogastropoda
- Superfamily: Conoidea
- Family: Raphitomidae
- Genus: Daphnella
- Species: D. rissoides

Binomial name
- Daphnella rissoides (Reeve, 1843)

Synonyms
- Clathurella rissoides (Reeve, 1845); Daphnella dentata (Souverbie, 1870); Daphnella (Hemidaphne) rissoides (Reeve, 1843)· accepted, alternate representation; Hemidaphne dentata Souverbie, 1869; Hemidaphne dentata Hervier, 1897; Hemidaphne rissoides (Reeve, 1843); Hemidaphne testabilis Jousseaume, 1896; Pleurotoma dentatum Souverbie, 1869; Pleurotoma rissoides Reeve, 1843 (original combination); Pusionella testabilis Jousseaume, 1896

= Daphnella rissoides =

Species of gastropod

Daphnella rissoides, common name the Rissoa-like pleurotoma, is a species of sea snail, a marine gastropod mollusk in the family Raphitomidae.

== Description ==
The length of the shell attains 23 mm.

The smooth shell is shining and semitransparent. The first three whorls are longitudinally plaited, the rest is smooth. The body whorl shows a varix nearly opposite the aperture (accidental ?). The columella is spirally twisted. The outer lip is rather thickened and delicately denticulated within. The sinus is small and distinct. The color of the shell is whitish, washed with clouded yellow streaks, the apex pink.

== Distribution ==
This marine species occurs off Aden, the Red Sea, the Philippines, New Caledonia and Queensland, Australia.
