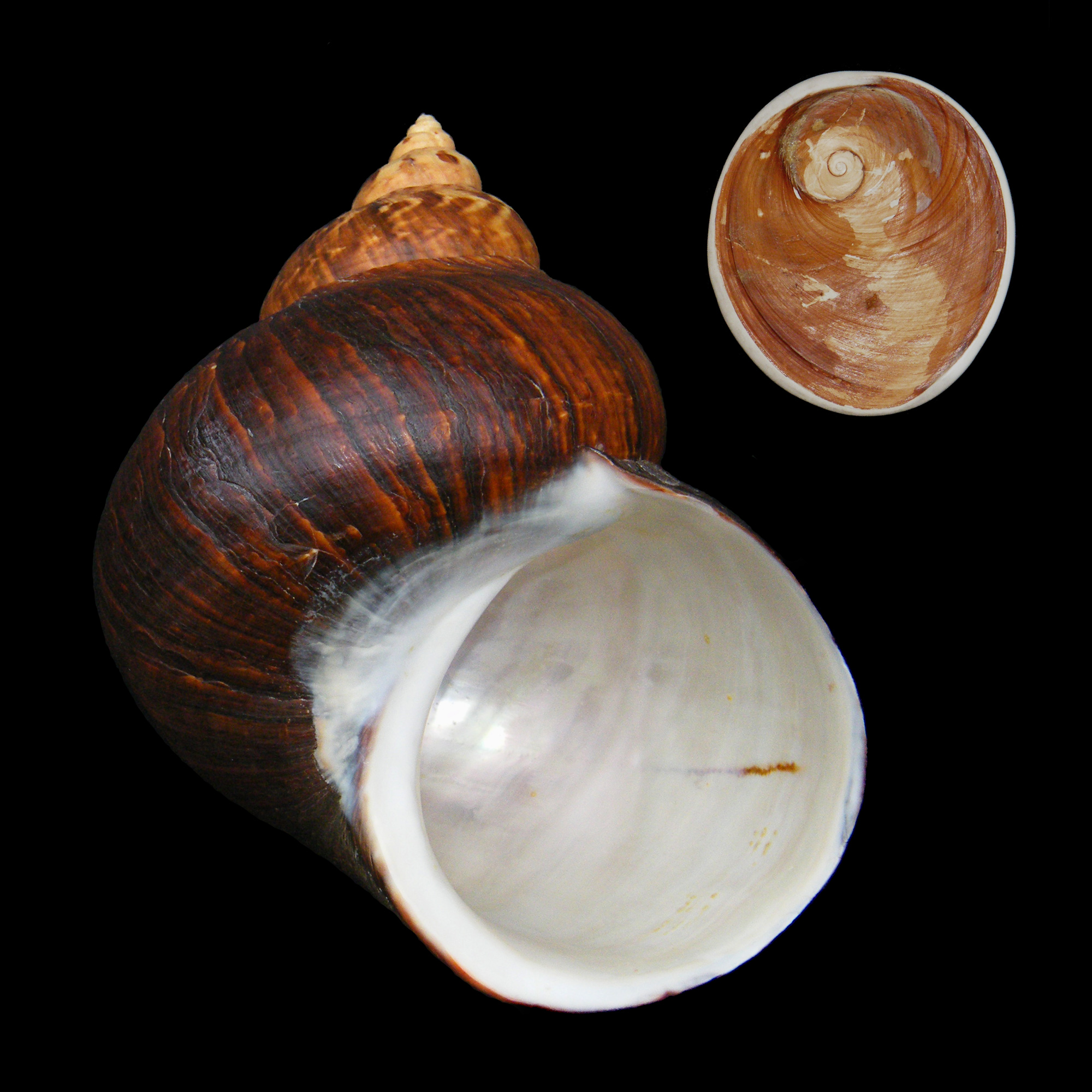
- A shell of Turbo jourdani

Scientific classification
- Kingdom: Animalia
- Phylum: Mollusca
- Class: Gastropoda
- Subclass: Vetigastropoda
- Order: Trochida
- Family: Turbinidae
- Genus: Turbo
- Species: T. jourdani

Binomial name
- Turbo jourdani Kiener, 1839

Synonyms
- Dinassovica verconis Iredale, 1937; Turbo (Dinassovica) jourdani Kiener, 1839; Turbo (Turbo) jourdani Kiener, 1839

= Turbo jourdani =

Species of gastropod

Turbo jourdani, common name the Jourdan's turban, is a species of sea snail, marine gastropod mollusk in the family Turbinidae.

- Taxonomic status: Some authors place the name in the subgenus Turbo (Dinassovica)

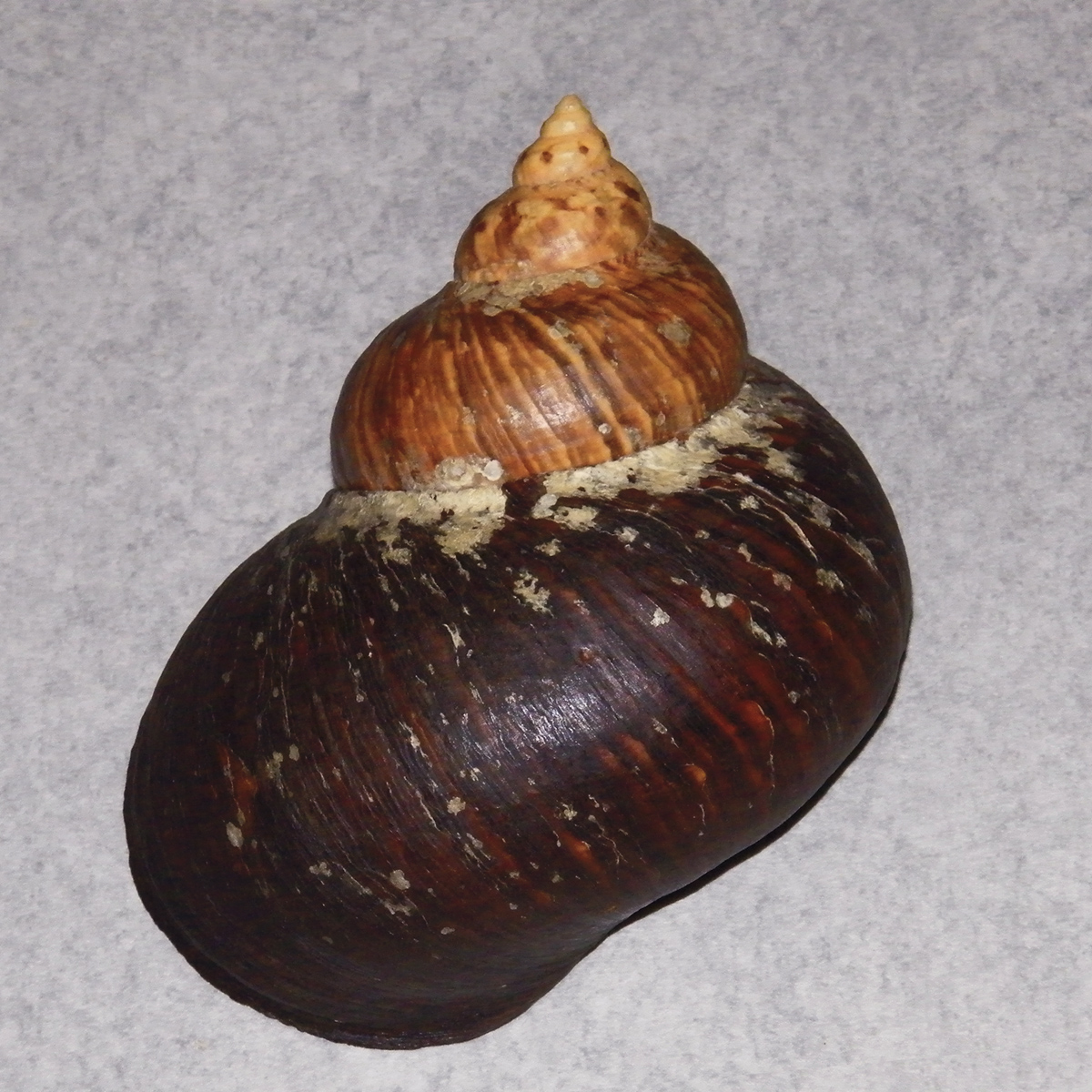
abapertural view of the shell

== Description ==
The length of the shell varies between 75 mm and 240 mm. The large, solid, imperforate shell has an ovate-conic shape with an acute spire. The color of its epidermis is castaneous or olive. The eight whorls are rounded and increase regularly in size. The upper ones are 1-3-carinate, the lower transversely obsoletely lirate. The body whorl is large, ventricose, descending, nearly smooth, or with wide spiral ribs. The circular aperture is white within. The outer lip is thin. The arcuate columella is not expanded at its base.

== Distribution ==
This marine species is known from Geraldton, Western Australia, to central South Australia.
