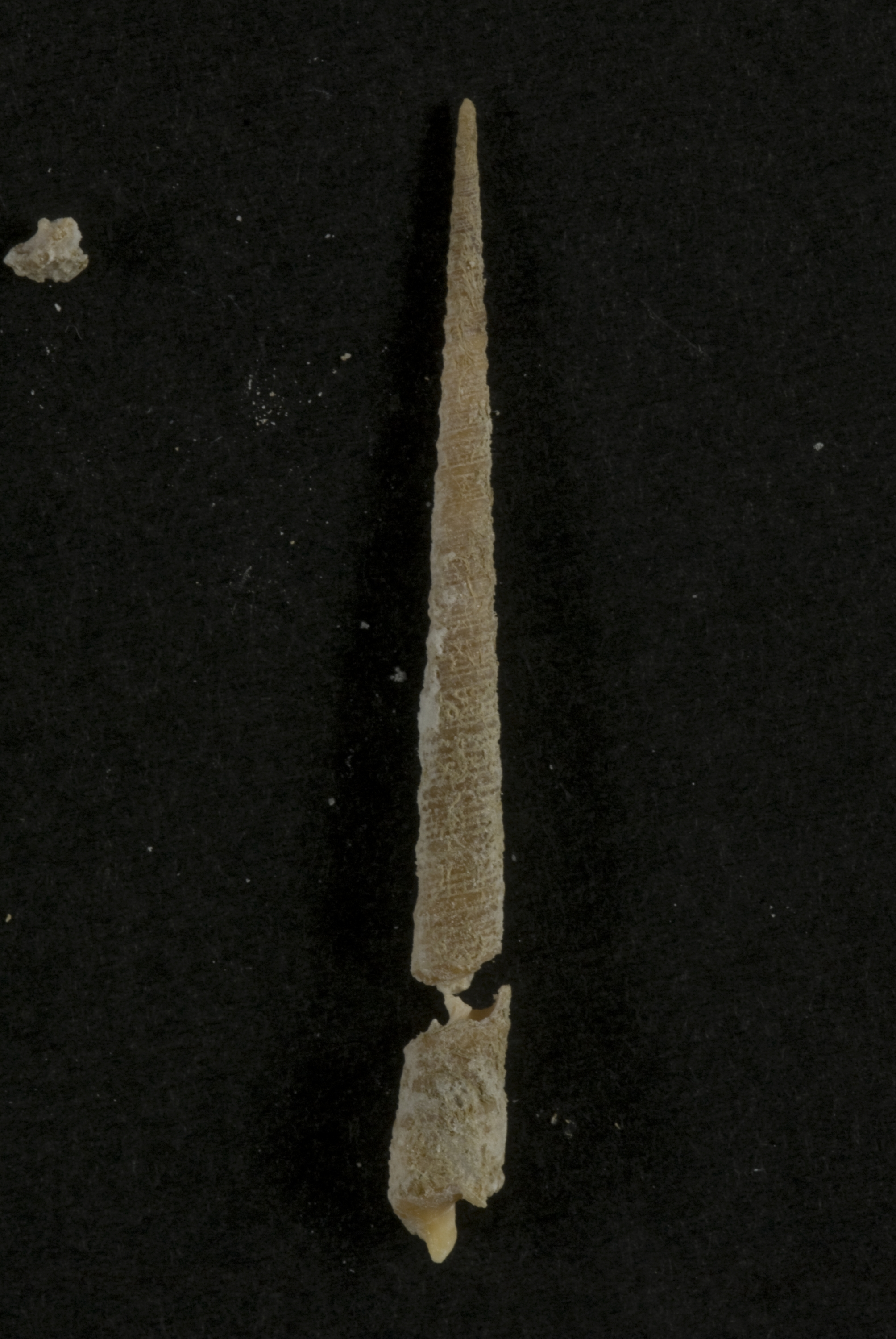

Scientific classification
- Kingdom: Animalia
- Phylum: Mollusca
- Class: Gastropoda
- Subclass: Caenogastropoda
- Order: Neogastropoda
- Superfamily: Conoidea
- Family: Terebridae
- Genus: Terebra
- Species: T. triseriata

Binomial name
- Terebra triseriata Gray, 1824

Synonyms
- Cinguloterebra triseriata (Gray, 1834); Triplostephanus triseriatus (Gray, 1834)

= Terebra triseriata =

Species of gastropod

Terebra triseriata is a species of sea snail, a marine gastropod mollusk in the family Terebridae, the auger snails.

== Distribution ==
This species occurs in the Indian Ocean off the Mascarene Basin.
