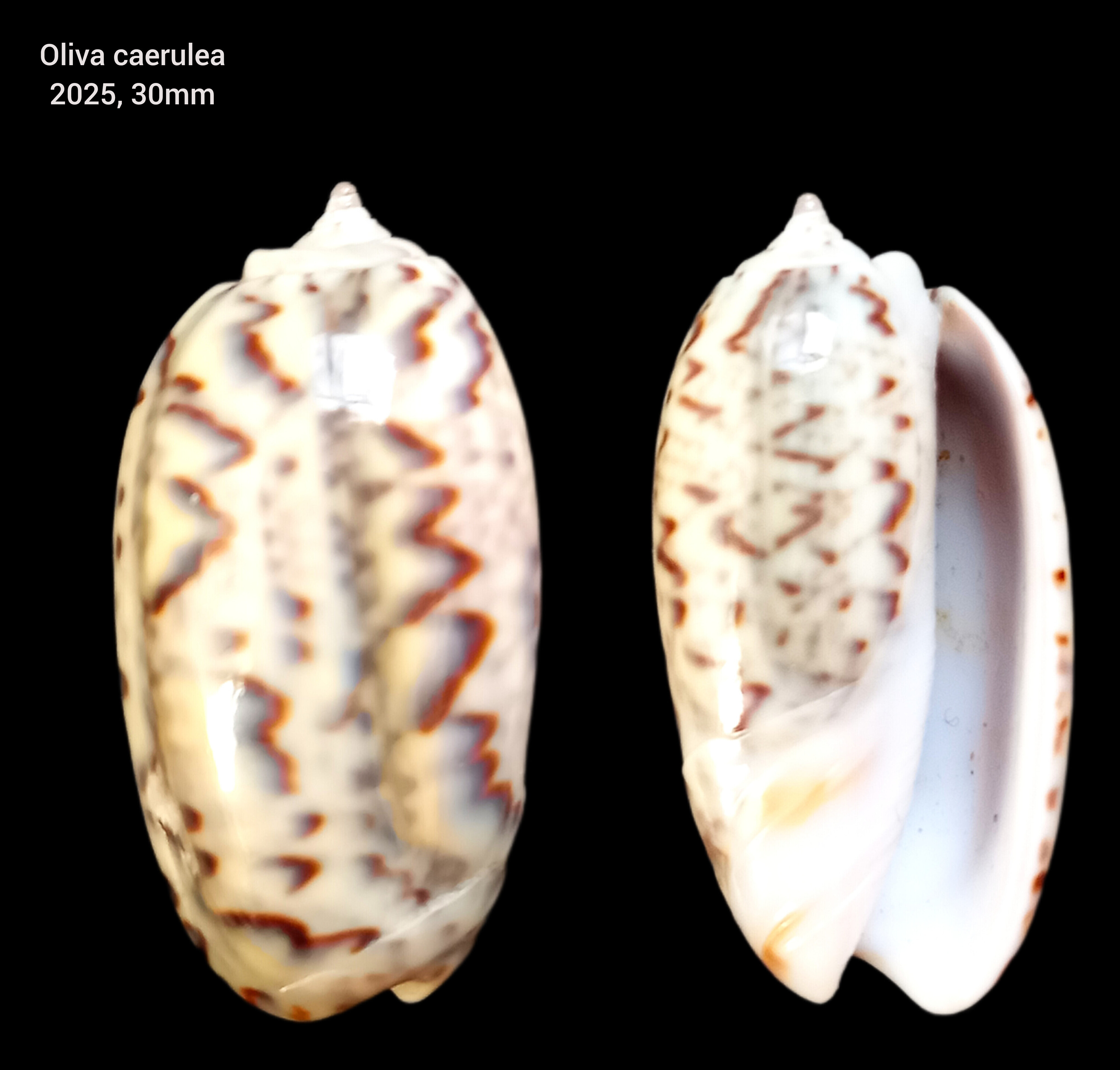

Scientific classification
- Kingdom: Animalia
- Phylum: Mollusca
- Class: Gastropoda
- Subclass: Caenogastropoda
- Order: Neogastropoda
- Family: Olividae
- Genus: Oliva
- Species: O. caerulea

Binomial name
- Oliva caerulea (Röding, 1798)

Synonyms
- Oliva episcopalis Lamarck, 1810

= Oliva caerulea =

Species of gastropod

Oliva caerulea is a species of sea snail, a marine gastropod mollusk in the family Olividae, the olives.
