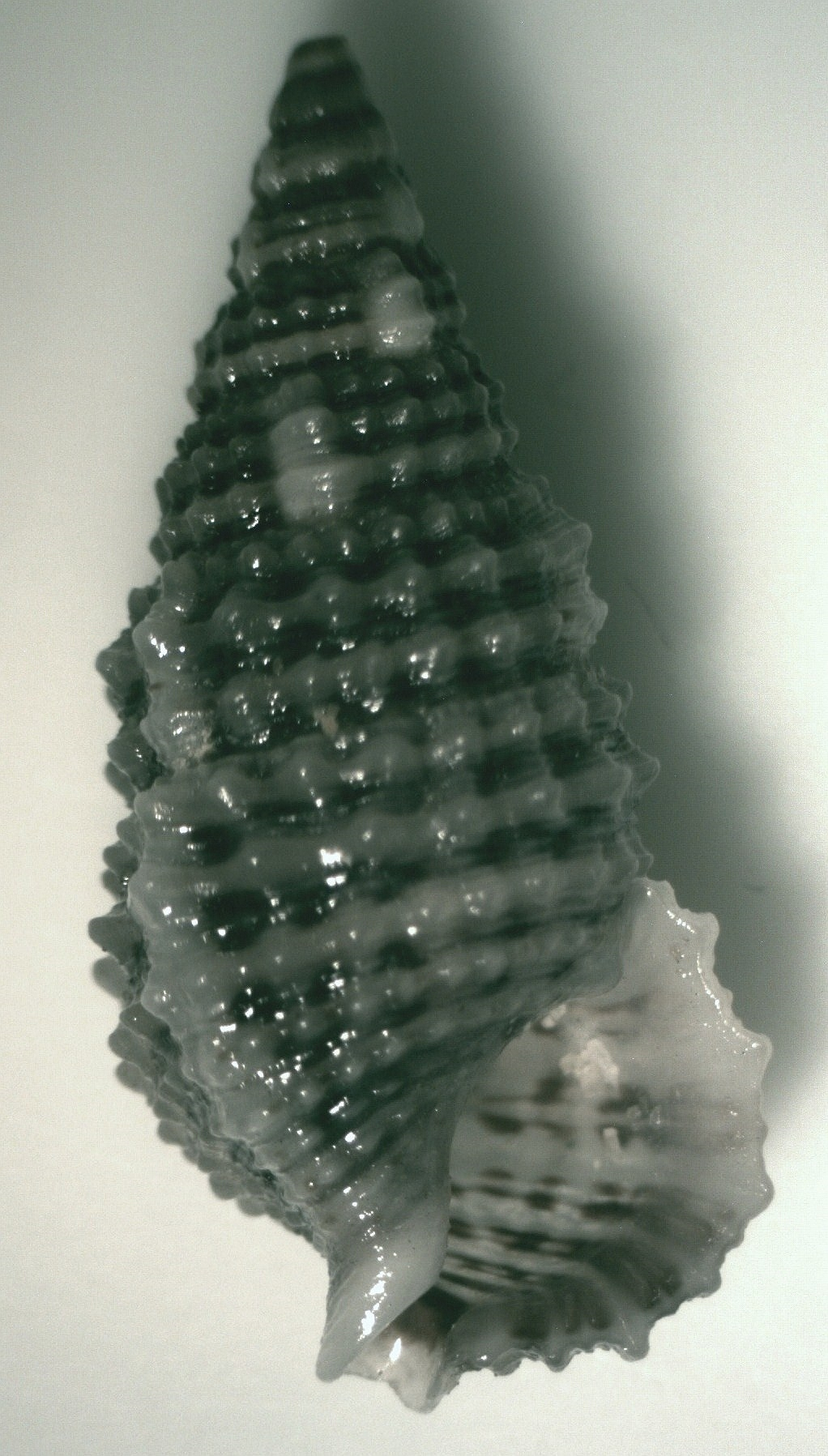

Scientific classification
- Kingdom: Animalia
- Phylum: Mollusca
- Class: Gastropoda
- Subclass: Caenogastropoda
- Order: incertae sedis
- Family: Cerithiidae
- Genus: Cerithium
- Species: C. tenellum

Binomial name
- Cerithium tenellum G.B. Sowerby II, 1855

Synonyms
- Cerithium (Clypeomorus) tenellum G.B. Sowerby II, 1855; Cerithium (Thericium) mysterium Hedley, 1917; Cerithium filosum G.B. Sowerby II, 1865; Cerithium mysterium Hedley, 1917; Cerithium novaehiberniae A. Adams in G.B. Sowerby II, 1855; Cerithium tenuifilosum G.B. Sowerby II, 1866; Cerithium tomlini Hedley, 1914

= Cerithium tenellum =

Species of gastropod

Cerithium tenellum is a species of sea snail, a marine gastropod mollusk in the family Cerithiidae.

== Distribution ==
The distribution of Cerithium tenellum includes the Western Central Pacific.

- Philippines
- Indonesia

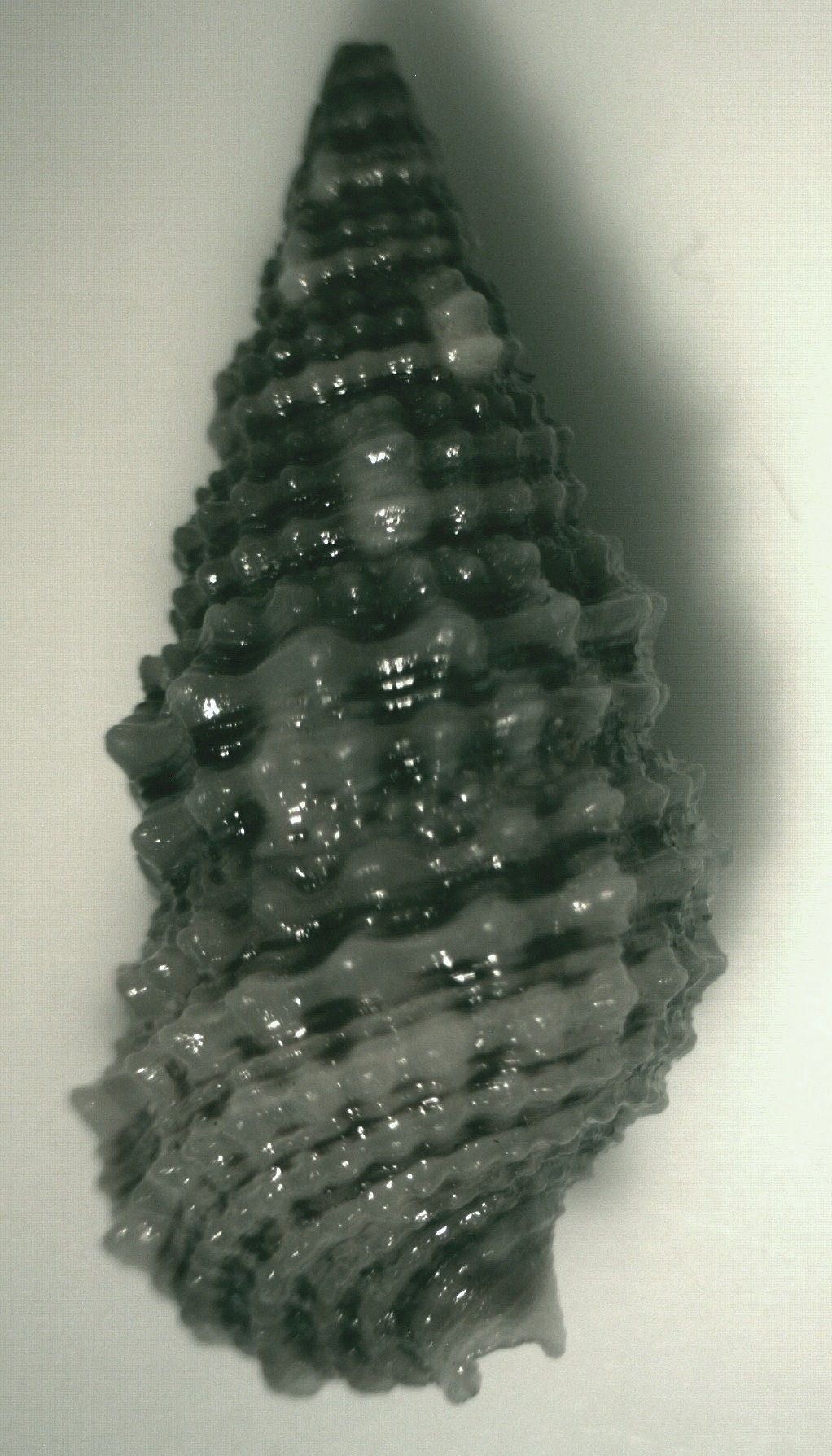
Cerithium tenellum, abapertural view

- México
