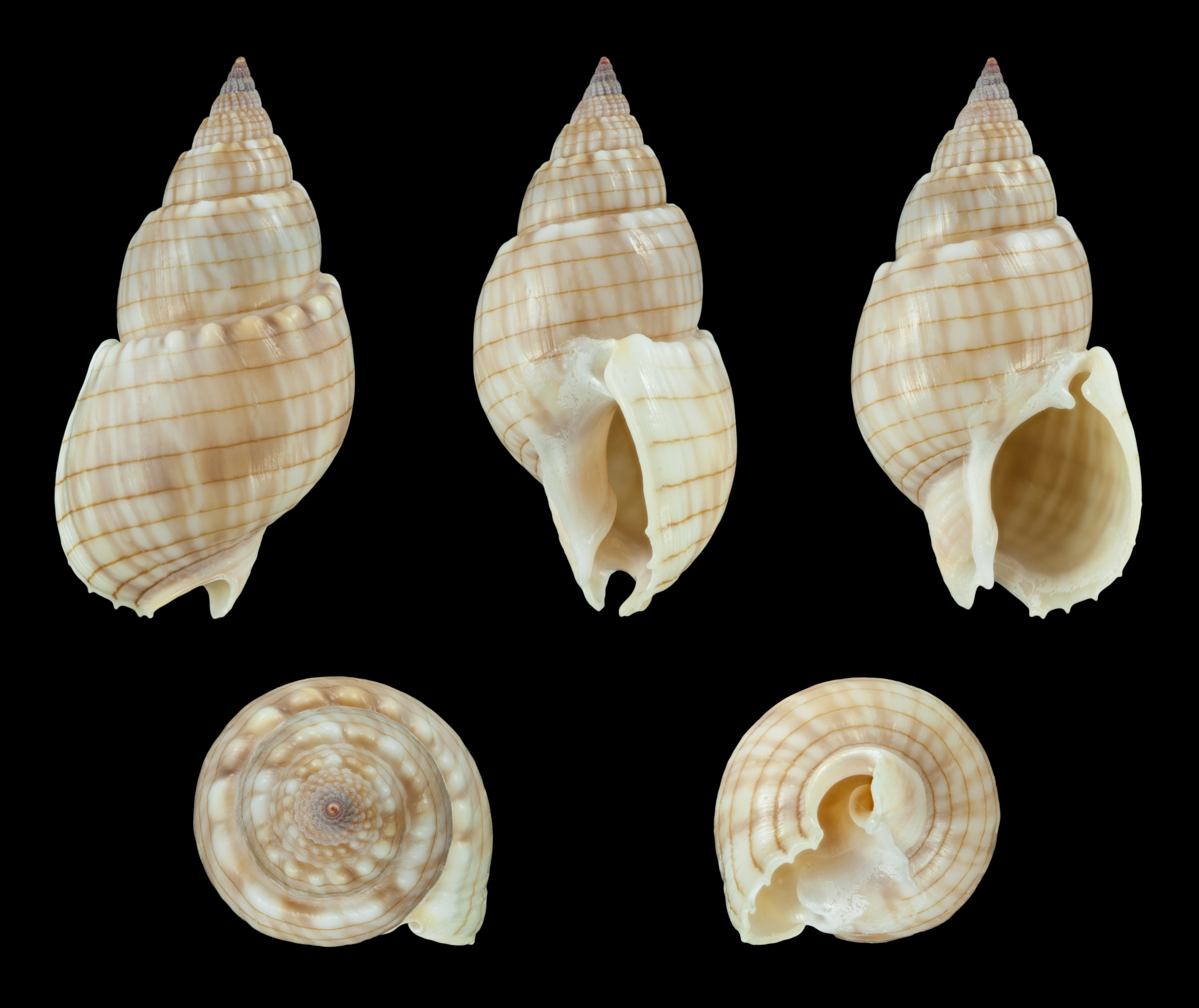
- A shell of Nassarius glans

Scientific classification
- Kingdom: Animalia
- Phylum: Mollusca
- Class: Gastropoda
- Subclass: Caenogastropoda
- Order: Neogastropoda
- Family: Nassariidae
- Genus: Nassarius
- Species: N. glans

Binomial name
- Nassarius glans (Linnaeus, 1758)

Synonyms
- Alectrion glans (Linnaeus, 1758); Alectrion glans nipponensis Kuroda & Habe, 1971; Ancilla lineata Perry, 1811; Buccinum glans Linnaeus, 1758; Buccinum lineatum Röding, 1798; Buccinum suturale Lamarck, 1822; Nassa intermedia Dunker, 1866; Nassa suturalis Lamarck, 1822; Nassa suturalis dunkeri Suter, 1908 (unnecessary replacement name); Nassarius (Alectrion) glans (Linnaeus, 1758); Nassarius (Alectrion) glans glans (Linnaeus, 1758) · accepted, alternate representation; Nassarius glans glans (Linnaeus, 1758) · accepted, alternate representation; Nassarius suturalis (Lamarck, 1822)

= Nassarius glans =

Species of gastropod

Nassarius glans, common name the acorn dog whelk, is a species of sea snail, a marine gastropod mollusc in the family Nassariidae, the Nassa mud snails or dog whelks.

== Subspecies ==
- Nassarius glans fenwicki Kilburn, 1972: synonym of Nassarius fenwicki Kilburn, 1972
- Nassarius glans glans (Linnaeus, 1758): represented as Nassarius glans (Linnaeus, 1758) (alternate representation)
- Nassarius glans particeps (Hedley, 1915)

== Description ==
The length of the shell varies between 15 mm and 50 mm.

The rather thin, smooth shell is ovate and conical. Its ground color is whitish, with spots of a more or less dark red, and upon the lower whorl, a very large spot of the same tint, but deeper. Upon the convexity of this whorl, may be counted nine or ten distant, parallel and transverse lines of a bright chestnut color, sometimes brown, at other times blackish. The spire is composed of eight whorls, the three lower of which are smooth, and the other five marked with small longitudinal folds, slightly arcuated. The ovate aperture is widened towards the base, which is deeply emarginated, terminated above by a small dilated canal, which is formed by a re-entering angle from the outer lip, and a transverse tooth from the left lip. The outer lip is arcuated towards the top, thinner from the middle to the base, and armed in this part with five conical, pointed teeth, the lowest of which are longest. It is ornamented in the interior with a great number of small, very fine transverse striae. The left lip forms a plate which laps over upon the body of the shell, and gives rise to a small projecting keel, which is terminated below by a pointed and oblique tooth, from whence a rounded fold is given out, which is observed to wind spirally into the cavity.

== Distribution ==
This species occurs in the Red Sea and in the Indian Ocean off Réunion, Mauritius and the Mascarene Basin; in the Indo-West Pacific.
