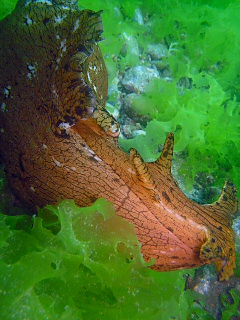

Scientific classification
- Kingdom: Animalia
- Phylum: Mollusca
- Class: Gastropoda
- Order: Aplysiida
- Family: Aplysiidae
- Genus: Aplysia
- Species: A. gigantea

Binomial name
- Aplysia gigantea G. B. Sowerby II, 1869

= Aplysia gigantea =

Species of mollusc in the family Aplysiidae

Aplysia gigantea is a species of sea slug, a shell-less marine gastropod mollusk in the family Aplysiidae.

The species was first described in the Journal of the Malacological Society of Australia in 1869. A. gigantea is also known more commonly as the sea hare due to their posterior chemosensory tentacles resembling a hare's ear. A. gigantea is the largest known species in Australia of the opisthobranch genus. The species is known to have toxic effects on terrestrial organisms, particularly domestic dogs. Exposure to this species with dogs has been associated with the development of neurotoxicosis, with symptoms ranging from respiratory distress to tremors, muscle fasciculations, and seizures.

== Distribution ==
Aplysia gigantea are commonly found near the southwestern corner of Western Australia, in soft sediment or reef environments. They are found in shallow water, ranging from 0-20m in depth. A. gigantea are most commonly witnessed from January to March, where beach strandings of this species can number in the hundreds. A. gigantea are found most often in waters that range from 13.1-23.2 °C. The species has not yet been assessed by the IUCN, and thus its conservation status remains unknown.

Due to the phenotypic similarity with Aplysia extaordinaria, it has been suggested by marine biologist Bill Rudman that these may be the same species. If this is true, then the combined species would have a distribution from the western shores of Australia to northern New Zealand and possibly more.

== Description ==
A. gigantea are known to be able to grow up to 60 cm long, making it one of the largest species of sea hare in Australia. They are usually a dark brown or black color. Additionally, they are distinguished by large paradopia on their backs, which function as limbs allowing the sea hare to swim for short periods of time. The species also has scent and taste receptors known as rhinophores, located on the upper side of its head. These organs resemble a hare's ears and are responsible for its more colloquial name of sea hare. The sea hare's eyes are also located beneath the rhinosphores, and are able to sense light and shadow. Its gills, as well as an internal, calcified shell are located near the organism's heart. The shell itself is particularly fragile, and the paradopia serve a secondary function in both enclosing and protecting it. The adults of this species are also herbivorous in nature, with a diet that primarily consists of algae.

== Defense ==
A. gigantea is able to produce ink and secretions from two main secretory glands that help the slug hide from or deter predators. When ingested by domestic dogs, several symptoms have been recorded, including respiratory issues, ptyalism, emesis, ataxia, and hyperaesthesia. It is suggested the diet of A. gigantea, consisting of organisms such as red algae, provides the molecules needed to create toxins.

== Reproduction ==
A. gigantea mate during summer and early autumn. A. gigantea are hermaphrodites and often mate in numbers ranging from 2 to approximately 20, producing orange colored spawn. In these mating groups, one individual will utilize only female or male reproductive organs respectively, while other participants use both. The eggs produced by A. gigantea are in long and stringy clumps, and hatch into planktonic larvae which feed on microscopic algae.
