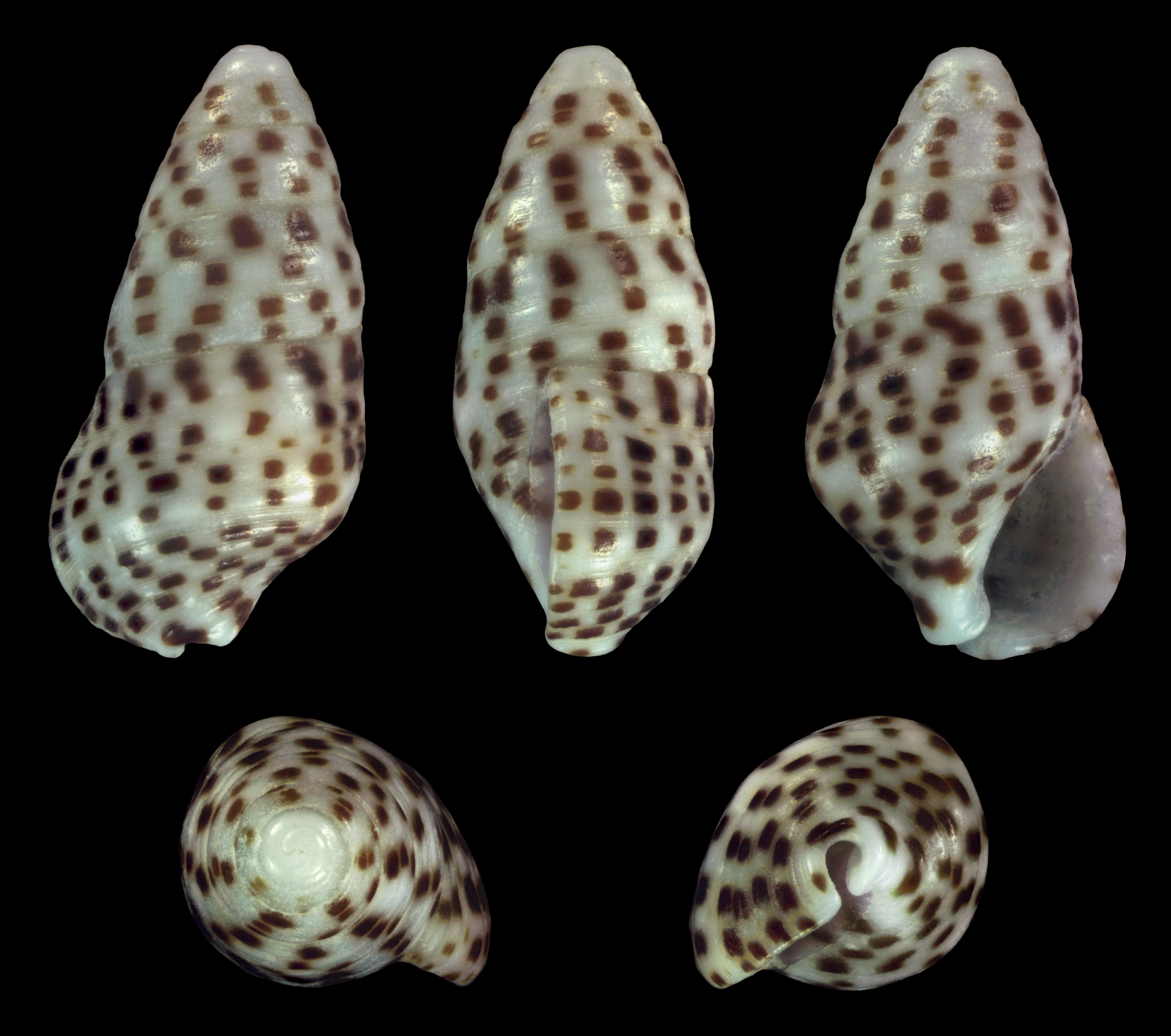

Scientific classification
- Kingdom: Animalia
- Phylum: Mollusca
- Class: Gastropoda
- Subclass: Caenogastropoda
- Order: incertae sedis
- Family: Cerithiidae
- Genus: Cerithium
- Species: C. punctatum

Binomial name
- Cerithium punctatum Bruguière, 1792

Synonyms
- Cerithium (Liocerithium) piperitum G.B. Sowerby II, 1855; Cerithium (Semivertagus) alveolus Hombron & Jacquinot, 1852; Cerithium (Semivertagus) piperitum G.B. Sowerby II, 1855; Cerithium (Thericium) alveolus Hombron & Jacquinot, 1852; Cerithium alveolus Hombron & Jacquinot, 1852; Cerithium piperitum G.B. Sowerby II, 1855; Lampania piperita (G.B. Sowerby II, 1855)

= Cerithium punctatum =

Species of gastropod

Cerithium punctatum is a species of sea snail, a marine gastropod mollusk in the family Cerithiidae.

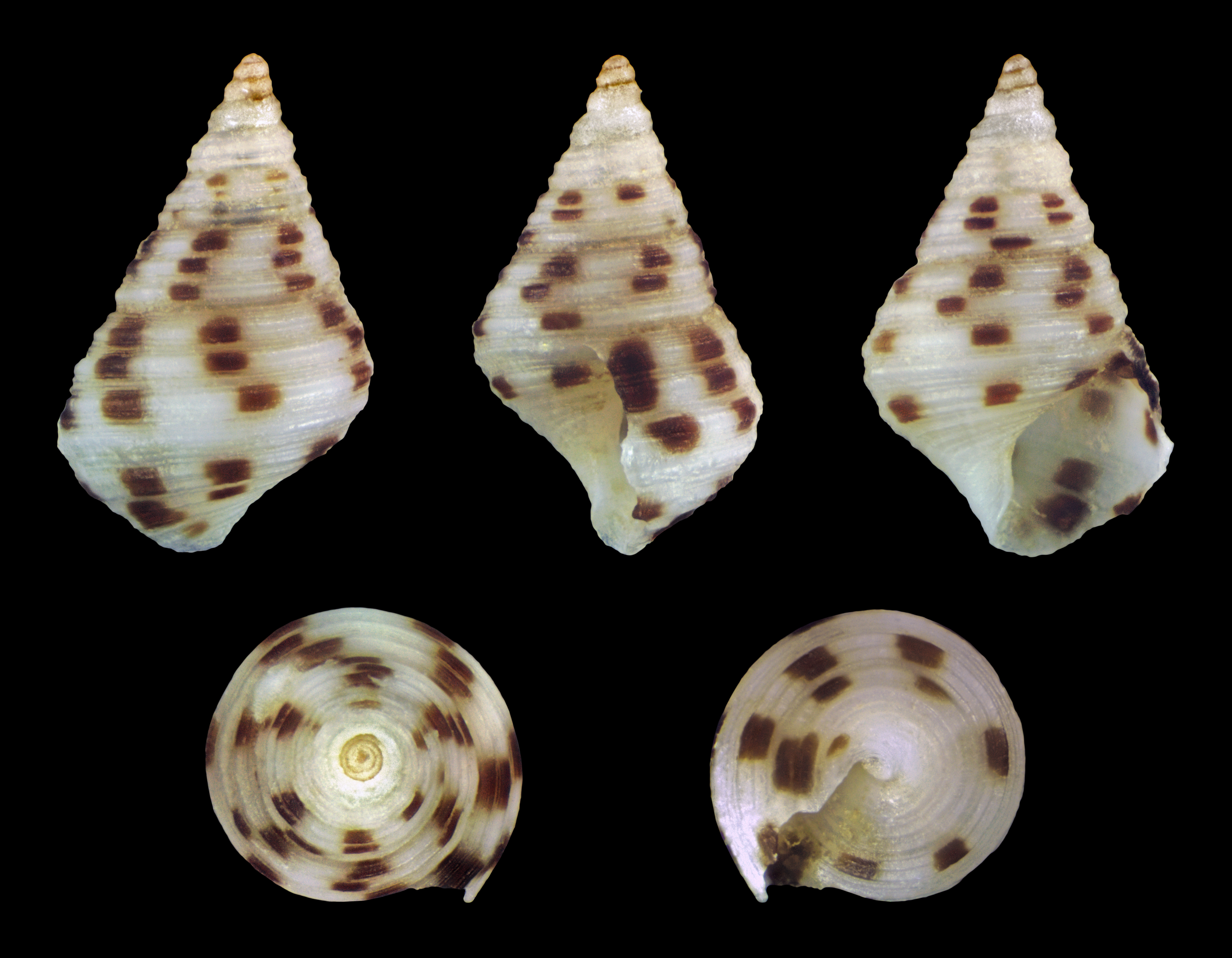
Juvenile

== Distribution ==
The distribution of Cerithium punctatum includes the Western Central Pacific.

- Guam
