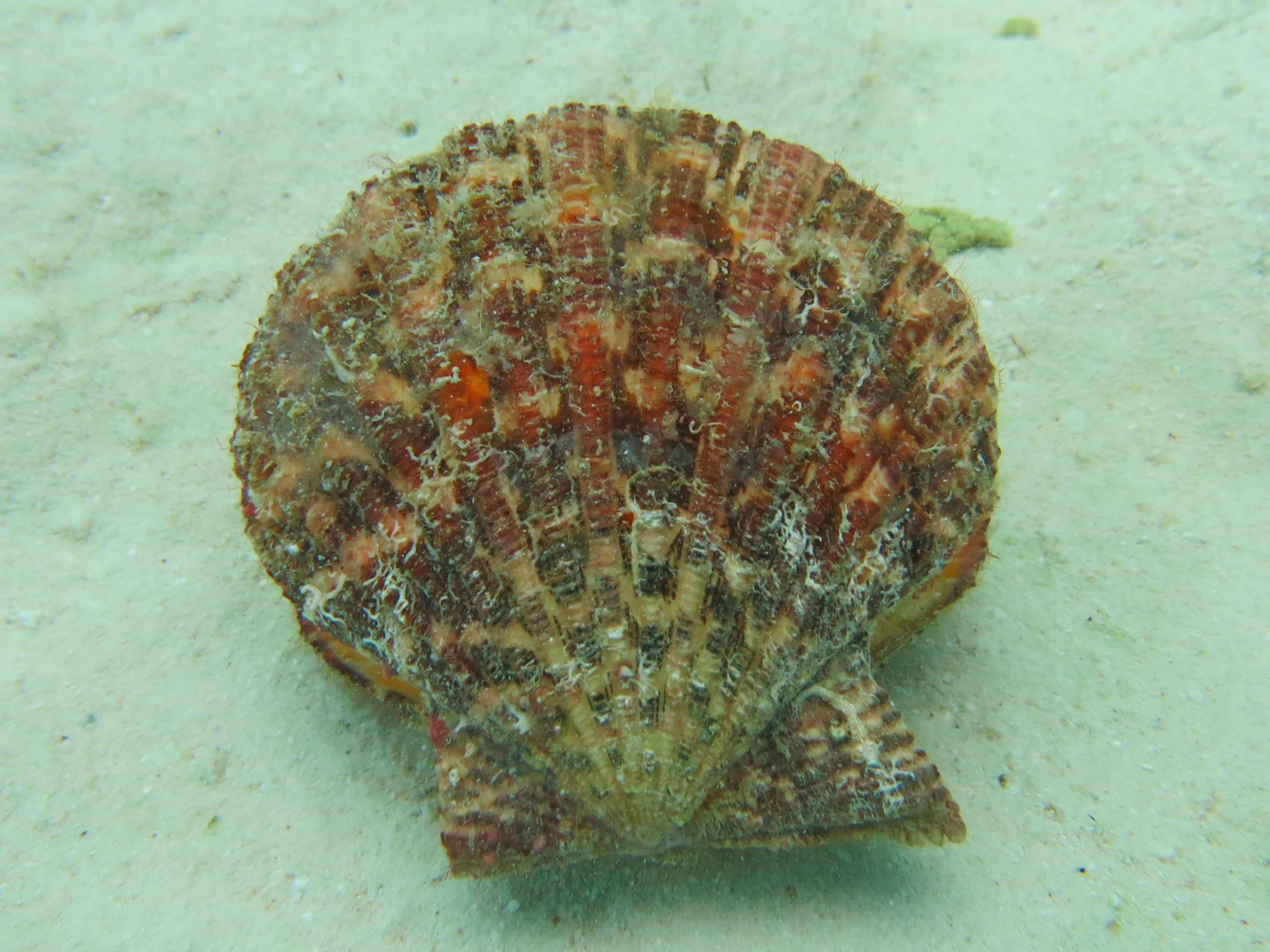

Scientific classification
- Kingdom: Animalia
- Phylum: Mollusca
- Class: Bivalvia
- Order: Pectinida
- Family: Pectinidae
- Genus: Gloripallium
- Species: G. pallium

Binomial name
- Gloripallium pallium (Linnaeus, 1758)

= Gloripallium pallium =

Species of bivalve

Gloripallium pallium is a species of bivalves belonging to the family Pectinidae.

The species is found in Indian and Pacific Ocean, Australia.

Right and left valve of the same specimen:

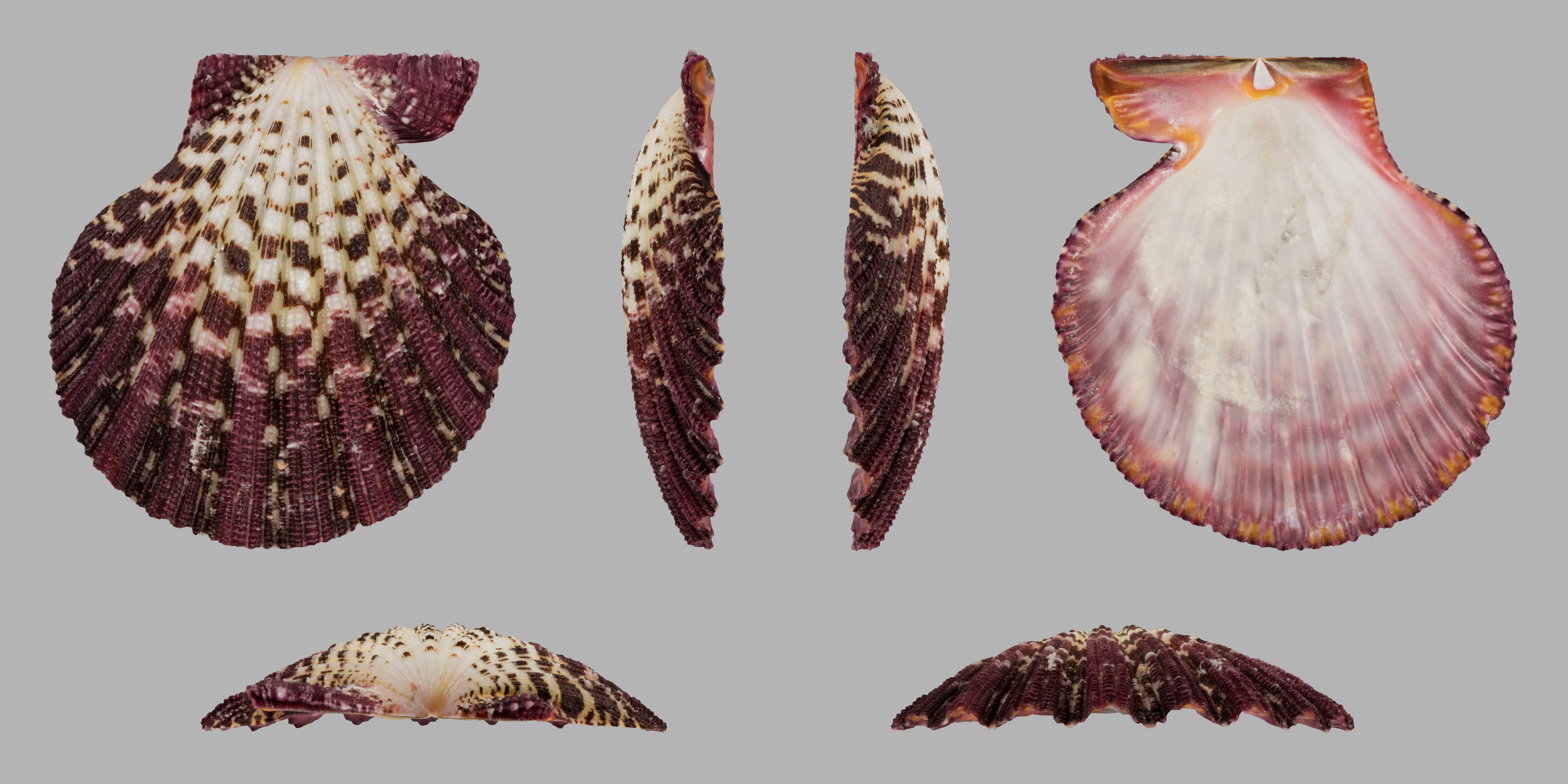
Right valve

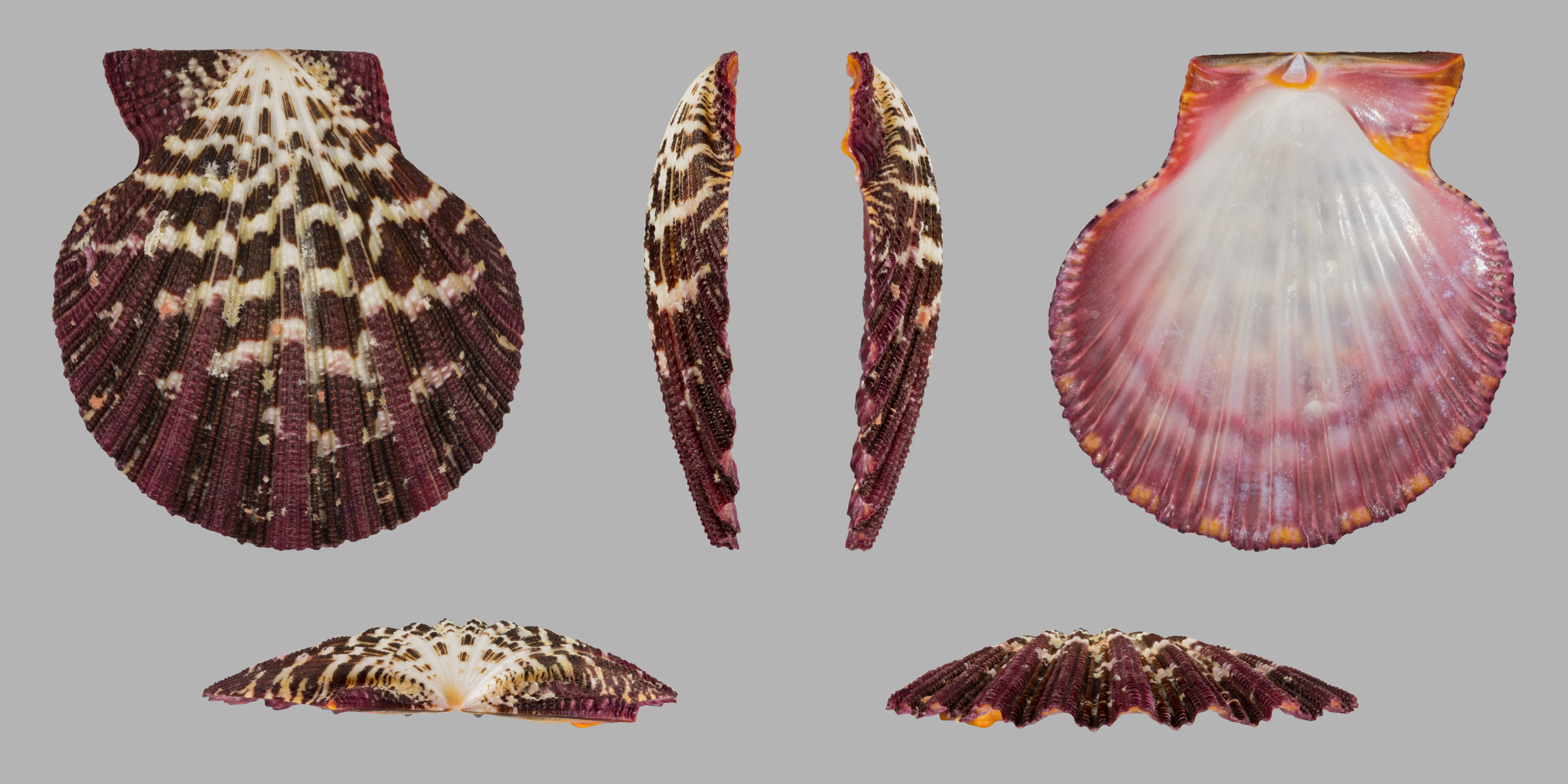
Left valve
