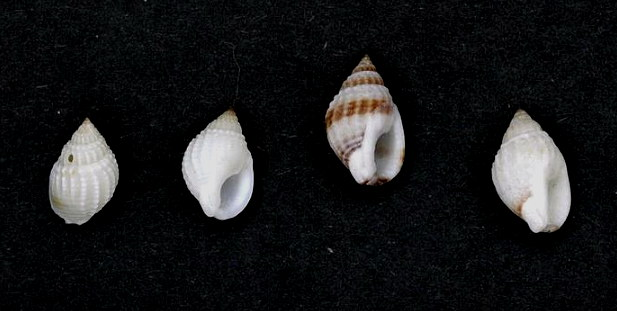
- A collection of shells of Nassarius pauperatus (museum specimens at Naturalis Biodiversity Center)

Scientific classification
- Kingdom: Animalia
- Phylum: Mollusca
- Class: Gastropoda
- Subclass: Caenogastropoda
- Order: Neogastropoda
- Family: Nassariidae
- Genus: Nassarius
- Species: N. pauperatus

Binomial name
- Nassarius pauperatus (Lamarck, 1822)

Synonyms
- synonymy: Arcularia pauperata (Lamarck, 1822); Buccinum australe Menke, 1843 (invalid: junior homonym of Buccinum australe Gmelin, 1791); Buccinum pauperatum Lamarck, 1822 (original combination); Nassa lirella Reeve, 1853; Nassa pauperata (Lamarck, 1822); Nassarius (Niotha) pauperatus (Lamarck, 1822) · accepted, alternate representation; Parcanassa pauperata (Lamarck, 1822); Tavaniotha pauperata (Lamarck, 1822)

= Nassarius pauperatus =

Species of gastropod

Nassarius pauperatus, commonly known as the impoverished dog whelk, is a species of sea snail, a marine gastropod mollusk in the family Nassariidae, the nassa mud snails, or dog whelks.

== Description ==
The length of the shell varies from 12 mm to 20 mm.

The ovate, conical shell is pointed at the summit. The pyramidal spire is formed of six or seven distinct, smooth, convex whorls. These are covered with very prominent, convex, longitudinal folds, intersected only at the base, and upon the two or three upper whorls, by a few pretty deep transverse striae. Upon these whorls, the striae become finer and more approximate. They rarely exist upon the whole surface. In like manner, the longitudinal folds do not appear upon the right portion of the body whorl. The color is a violaceous white. A dark red zone borders the suture, and a broader and browner band surrounds the middle of the body whorl.

== Distribution ==
This marine species is endemic to Australia and occurs off of New South Wales, South Australia, Tasmania, Victoria, and Western Australia.

== Bibliography ==
- Lamarck, J.B.P.A. de M. 1822. Histoire naturelle des Animaux sans Vertèbres. Paris : J.B. Lamarck Vol. 7 711 pp.
- Menke, C.T. 1843. Molluscorum Novae Hollandiae Specimen in Libraria Aulica Hahniana. Hannoverae : Libraria Aulica Hahniana pp. 1–46
- Cernohorsky, W. O. (1981). "Revision of the Australian and New Zealand Tertiary and Recent Species of the Family Nassariidae (Mollusca: Gastropoda)". Records of the Auckland Institute and Museum. 18: 137–192. ISSN 0067-0464. JSTOR 42906302. Wikidata Q58677171.
- Cernohorsky W. O. (1984). Systematics of the family Nassariidae (Mollusca: Gastropoda). Bulletin of the Auckland Institute and Museum 14: 1–356
- Wilson, B. 1994. Australian Marine Shells. Prosobranch Gastropods. Kallaroo, WA : Odyssey Publishing Vol. 2 370 pp.
