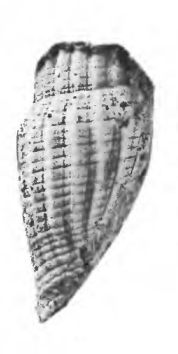
- Partial shell of Vexillum zebuense

Scientific classification
- Kingdom: Animalia
- Phylum: Mollusca
- Class: Gastropoda
- Subclass: Caenogastropoda
- Order: Neogastropoda
- Family: Costellariidae
- Genus: Vexillum
- Species: V. zebuense

Binomial name
- Vexillum zebuense (Reeve, 1844)

Synonyms
- Mitra praetexta G. B. Sowerby II, 1874 (probable synonym); Mitra praetexta G. B. Sowerby II, 1870; Mitra puncturata G. B. Sowerby III, 1879 (original combination); Mitra rorata Gould, 1850 ·; Mitra rufomaculata Souverbie, 1860; Mitra zebuensis Reeve, 1844 (original combination); Vexillum (Costellaria) zebuense (Reeve, 1844); Vexillum puncturatum (G. B. Sowerby III, 1879)

= Vexillum zebuense =

Species of gastropod

Vexillum zebuense, common name the zebu mitre, is a species of small sea snail, marine gastropod mollusk in the family Costellariidae, the ribbed miters.

== Description ==
The length of the shell attains 28 mm.

(Original description) The shell is somewhat fusiform and shining. It is grooved towards the base, very finely cancellated with rather flat close-set ridges, of which the longitudinal are the stronger. The shell is white, the upper part of the whorls is ornamented with a few large chestnut-brown spots. The columella is five-plaited.

The shell shows strong axial ribs with narrow flattened crests. They are overridden and slightly notched by narrow spiral grooves that separate wide flattened areas.

== Distribution ==
This marine species occurs in the western Pacific from the Philippines, through Fiji to Polynesia.
