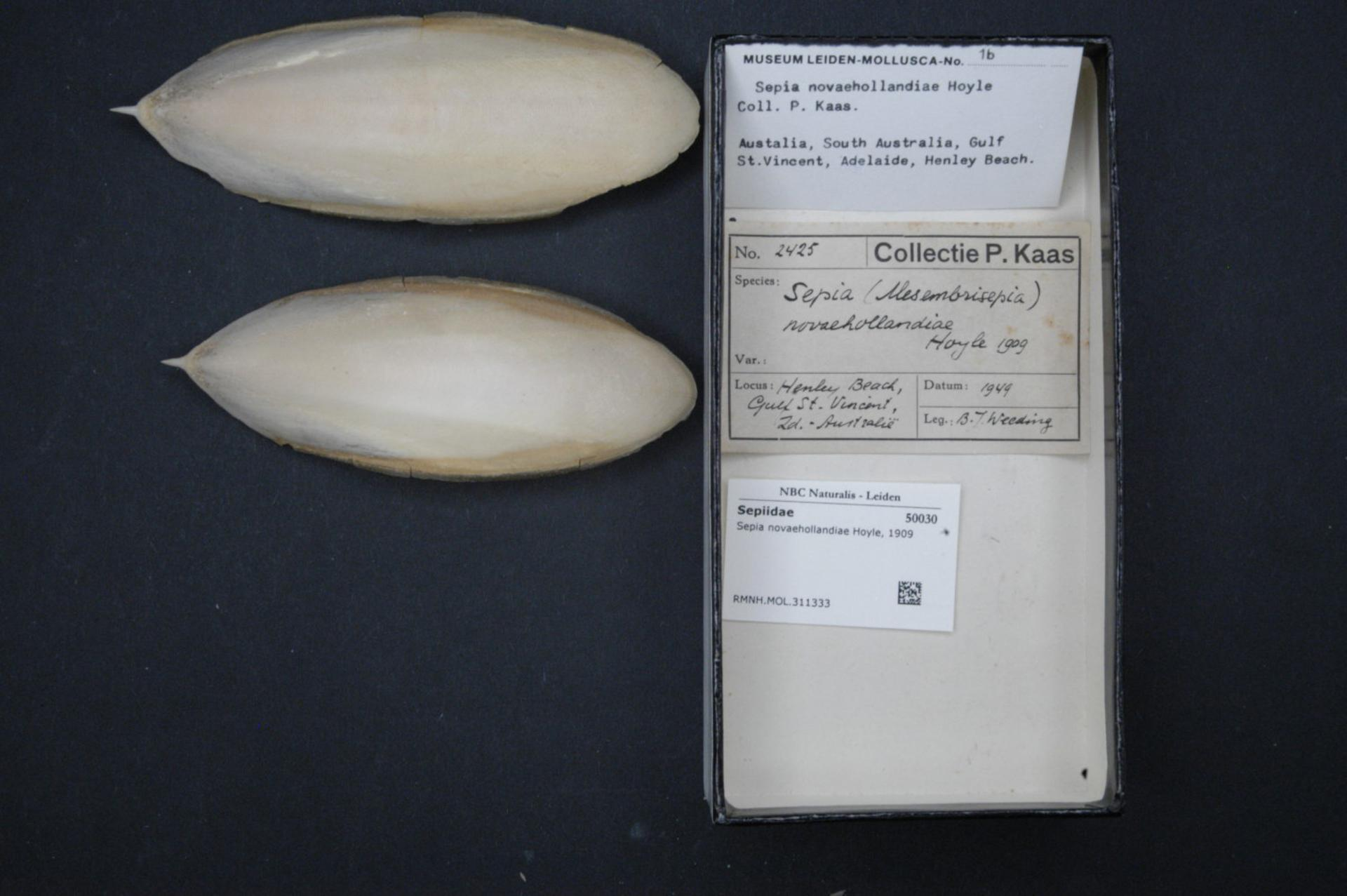
- Cuttlebone from Ascarosepion novaehollandiae at Rijksmuseum van Natuurlijke Historie, Leiden

Conservation status
- Least Concern (IUCN 3.1)

Scientific classification
- Kingdom: Animalia
- Phylum: Mollusca
- Class: Cephalopoda
- Order: Sepiida
- Family: Sepiidae
- Genus: Ascarosepion
- Species: A. novaehollandiae

Binomial name
- Ascarosepion novaehollandiae (Hoyle, 1909)

Synonyms
- Sepia novaehollandiae, Hoyle 1909; Mesembrisepia macandrewi Iredale, 1926; Mesembrisepia ostanes Iredale, 1926

= Ascarosepion novaehollandiae =

Species of cuttlefish

Ascarosepion novaehollandiae is a species of cuttlefish native to the southern Indo-Pacific. Its natural range stretches from Shellharbour, New South Wales (34°35′S 150°52′E) to Northwest Shelf in Western Australia (18°57′S 118°45′E). It lives at depths of between 15 and 348 m.

== Description ==
The type specimen was collected off Kangaroo Island, South Australia (35°50′S 138°03′E). It is deposited at the Muséum National d'Histoire Naturelle in Paris. The species was described by Hoyle in 1909.

Ascarosepion novaehollandiae is known to grow to a mantle length of 77 mm, but specimens from Spencer Gulf reach mantle lengths of around 125 mm and larger specimens of cuttlebones reaching lengths of 170 mm have also been found.

=== Spencer Gulf population ===
Specimens collected from Spencer Gulf in South Australia have mantle lengths and weights "rarely exceeding" 125 mm and 521 grams respectively. The mantle is oblong with narrow lateral fins running along its length. Specimens are brown, with small white blotches speckled on the mantle. There are no discernible patterns on the arms. In 2015, South Australian Research and Development Institute (SARDI) scientist Mike Steer further described the species' cuttlebone as follows:

"Sepions are elongate oval, acutely narrowing at both ends. The posterior dorsal surface typically has a pinkish tinge and is covered with fine denticulate projections that diminish anteriorly. The ribs are sharply concentric and become more pronounced anteriorly. The rostrum appears as a prominent spike that projects on a slight dorsal angle. The striated zone of the ventral surface is long extending greater than two-thirds of the length of the sepion. The striae are broadly V-shaped and are wavy across the mid-groove. The median sulcus is wide and deep along the striated zone. The outer cone slightly scallops inwards before expanding posteriorly."

== Biology ==
Fishery dependent and independent data from Spencer Gulf has shown that largest populations of sexually immature A. novaehollandiae are caught between February and May annually. No data was published for months July–October or January.

== Fisheries interactions ==
The species is not targeted commercially in South Australia but is caught in marine scalefish fisheries and as bycatch by trawl fisheries. Morphological similarities and overlapping geographical ranges have led to difficulties distinguishing S. novaehollandiae from juvenile Ascarosepion apama in some instances. The Spencer Gulf Prawn Fishery catches more individuals of A. novaehollandiae than either of the other cuttlefish bycatch species: Sepia apama and Sepia braggi.
