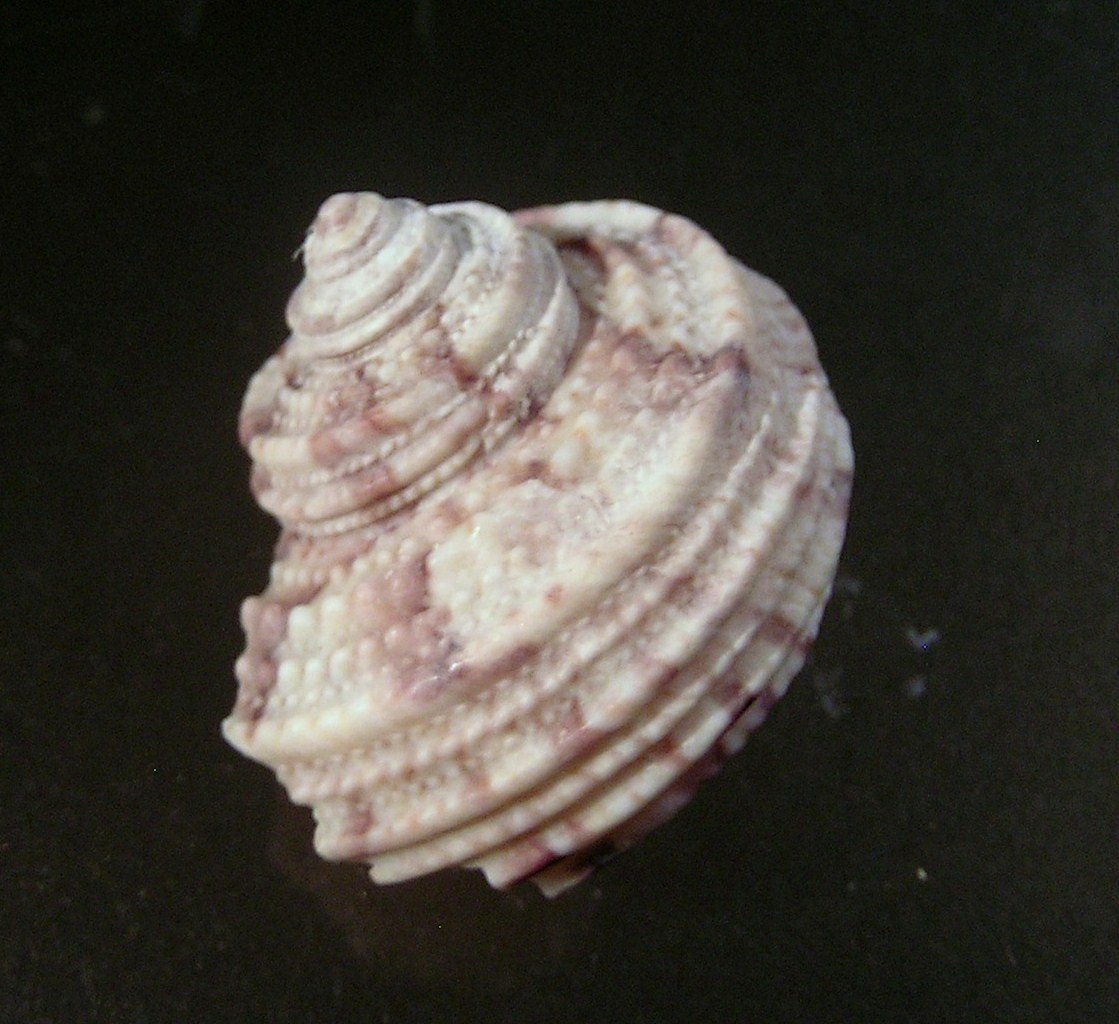

Scientific classification
- Kingdom: Animalia
- Phylum: Mollusca
- Class: Gastropoda
- Subclass: Vetigastropoda
- Order: Trochida
- Family: Turbinidae
- Genus: Turbo
- Species: T. gruneri

Binomial name
- Turbo gruneri Philippi, 1846

Synonyms
- Euninella circularis Reeve, 1848; Turbo circularis Reeve, 1848; Turbo (Carswellena) gruneri Philippi, 1846; Turbo (Euninella) circularis Reeve, L.A., 1848; Turbo (Euninella) gruneri Philippi, R.A., 1846

= Turbo gruneri =

Species of gastropod

Turbo gruneri, common name the Gruner's turban, is a species of sea snail, marine gastropod mollusk in the family Turbinidae.

== Description ==
The length of the shell varies between 18 mm and 45 mm. The orbicular, imperforate shell is conoid with an acute apex. It is of pale flesh-color, maculated with bright rufous. The convex whorls are spirally sculptured with granulose lirae. The aperture is circular. The wide columella is callous, slightly dilated and bounded outside by a spiral funicle.

== Distribution ==
This marine species occurs in South and West Australia, and off Tasmania.
