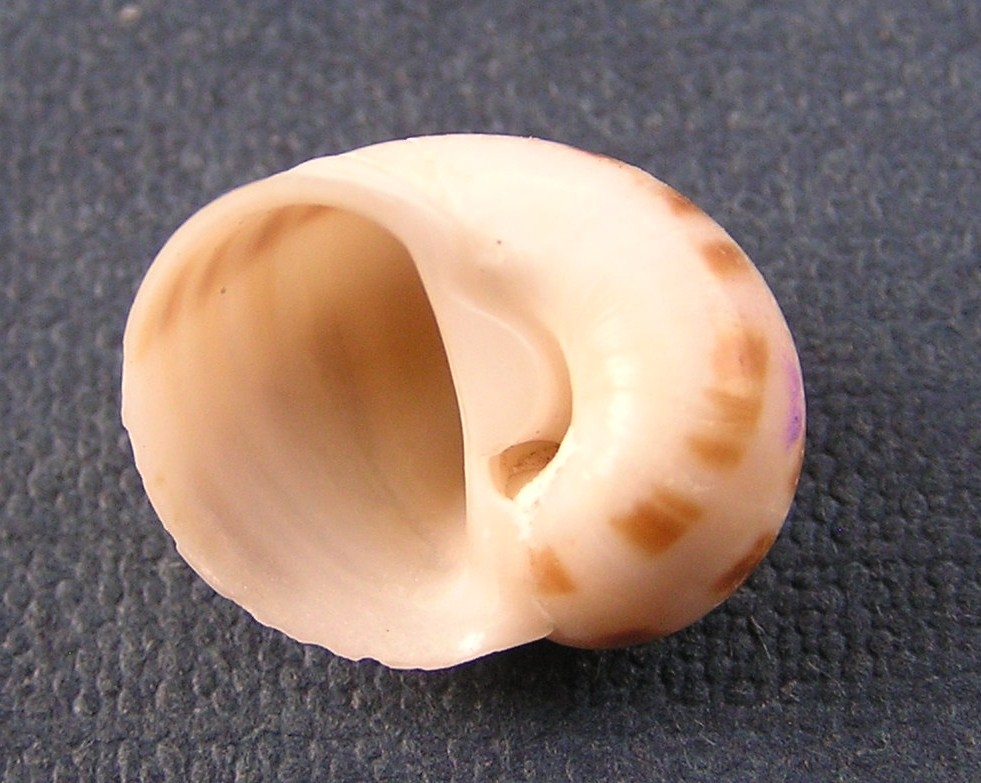

Scientific classification
- Kingdom: Animalia
- Phylum: Mollusca
- Class: Gastropoda
- Subclass: Caenogastropoda
- Order: Littorinimorpha
- Family: Naticidae
- Genus: Natica
- Species: N. seychellium

Binomial name
- Natica seychellium Watson, 1886

Synonyms
- Natica sertata Menke, 1843; Natica maheense Reeve, 1855

= Natica seychellium =

Species of gastropod

Natica seychellium is a species of predatory sea snail, a marine gastropod mollusk in the family Naticidae, the moon snails.

== Gallery ==
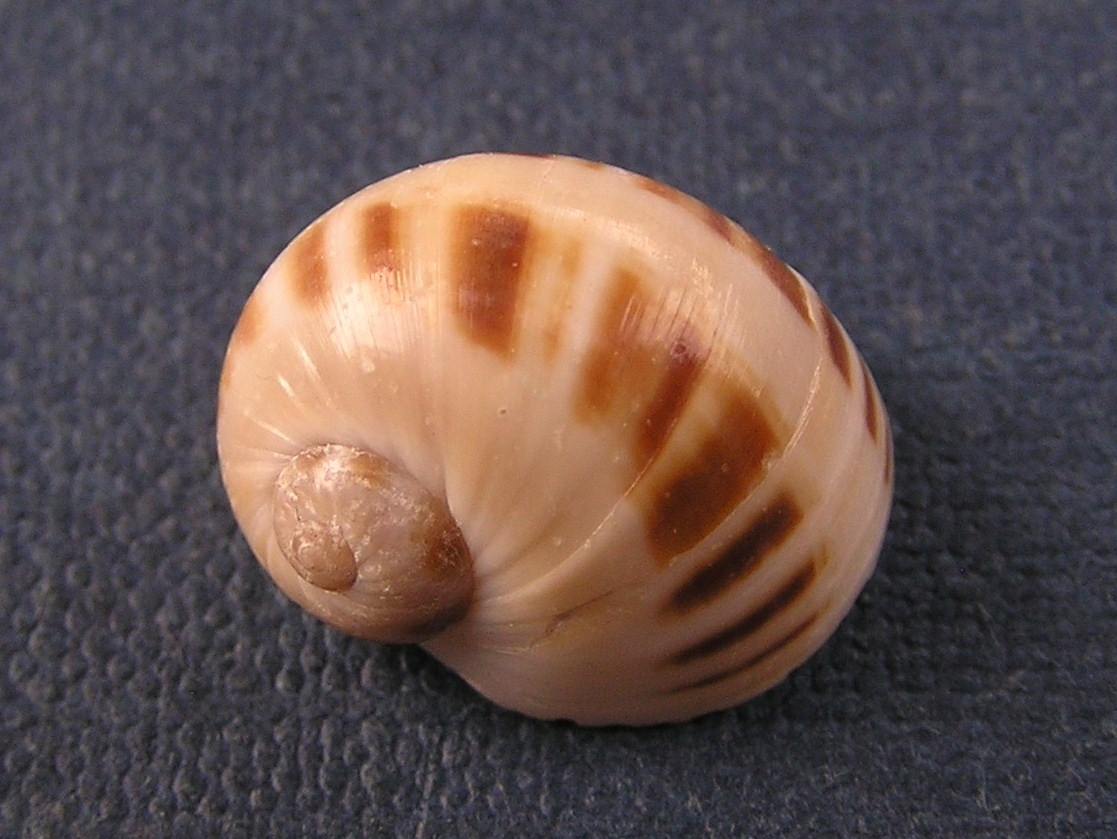
apical view

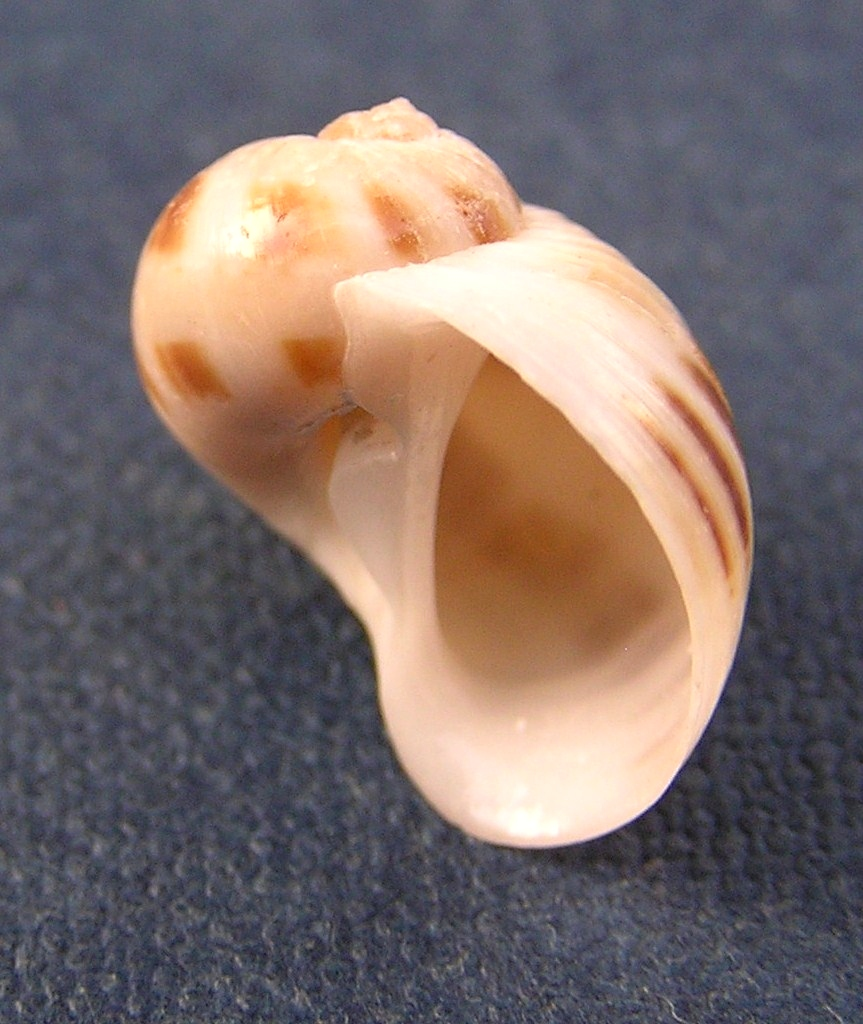
apertural view
