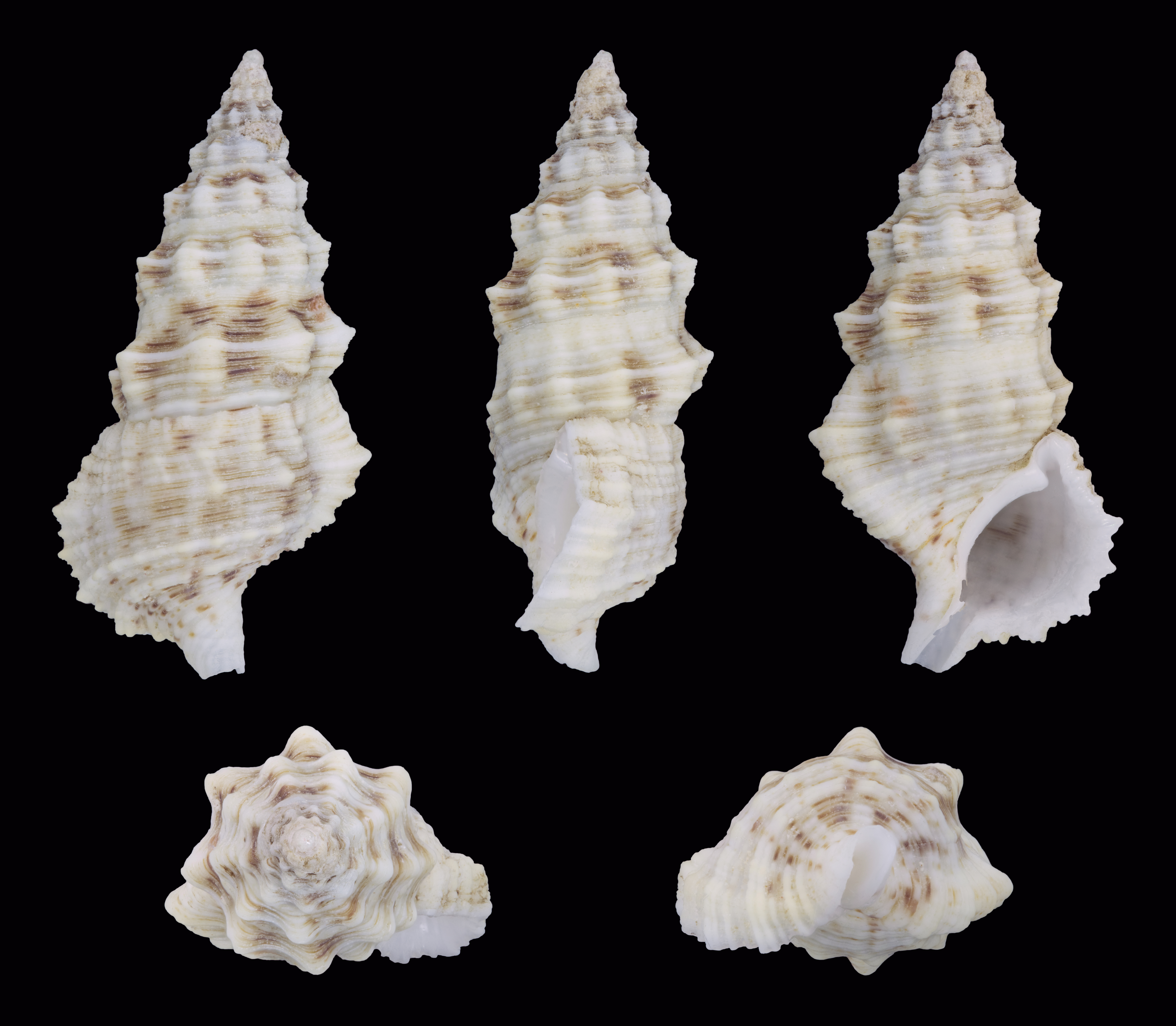
- Shell of Cerithium columna

Scientific classification
- Kingdom: Animalia
- Phylum: Mollusca
- Class: Gastropoda
- Subclass: Caenogastropoda
- Order: incertae sedis
- Family: Cerithiidae
- Genus: Cerithium
- Species: C. columna

Binomial name
- Cerithium columna G.B. Sowerby I, 1834

Synonyms
- Cerithium citrinoide Kobelt, 1893; Cerithium cylindraceum Pease, 1869; Cerithium fusiforme G.B. Sowerby II, 1855; Cerithium menkei Deshayes, 1863; Cerithium munitoides Habe, 1964; Cerithium peasi Dautzenberg & Bouge, 1933; Cerithium proditum Bayle, 1880; Cerithium sandvichense Reeve, 1865; Cerithium sculptum Pease, 1869; Cerithium siphonatum G.B. Sowerby II, 1865

= Cerithium columna =

Species of gastropod

Cerithium columna is a species of sea snail, a marine gastropod mollusk in the family Cerithiidae.

== Distribution ==
The distribution of Cerithium columna includes the Pacific Ocean.
