= Paramoria weaveri =

Scientific classification
- Kingdom: Animalia
- Phylum: Mollusca
- Class: Gastropoda
- Subclass: Caenogastropoda
- Order: Neogastropoda
- Family: Volutidae
- Genus: Paramoria
- Species: P. weaveri

Binomial name
- Paramoria weaveri McMichael, 1961

Species of gastropod

Paramoria weaveri is a species of sea snail, a marine gastropod mollusk in the family Volutidae, the volutes.
