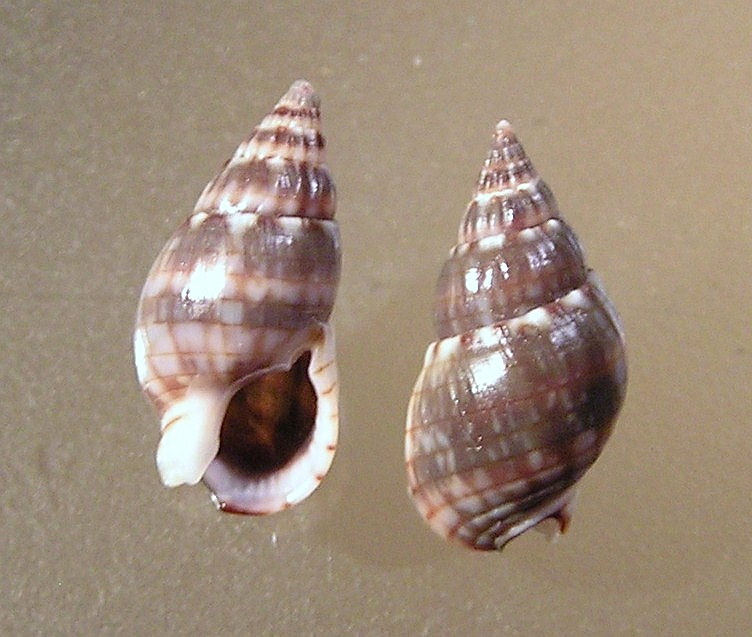
- Several views of a shell of Nassarius gaudiosus

Scientific classification
- Kingdom: Animalia
- Phylum: Mollusca
- Class: Gastropoda
- Subclass: Caenogastropoda
- Order: Neogastropoda
- Family: Nassariidae
- Genus: Nassarius
- Species: N. gaudiosus

Binomial name
- Nassarius gaudiosus (Hinds, 1844)

Synonyms
- Alectrion gaudiosus (Hinds, 1844); Arcularia gaudiosus (Hinds, 1844); Buccinum (Nassa) semiplicatum Dunker, 1853; Nassa (Alectryon) mucronata A. Adams, 1852; Nassa (Telasco) gaudiosa Hinds, 1844; Nassa (Zeuxis) gaudiosa Hinds, 1844; Nassa gaudiosa Hinds, 1844; Nassa graphitera Beck in Marrat, 1877; Nassa lilacina Goulds, 1852; Nassa mucronata A. Adams, 1852; Nassa semisulcata Dunker, 1867; Nassarius (Alectrion) mucronatus (A. Adams, 1852); Nassarius (Niotha) gaudiosus (Hinds, 1844); Nassarius (Tarazeuxis) mucronatus (A. Adams, 1852); Nassarius (Telasco) gaudiosus (Hinds, 1844); Nassarius gaudiosus mucronatus (A. Adams, 1851); Nassarius mucronata; Tarazeuxis mucronatus (A. Adams, 1852)

= Nassarius gaudiosus =

Species of gastropod

Nassarius gaudiosus, common name the gaudy nassa, is a species of sea snail, a marine gastropod mollusk in the family Nassariidae, the Nassa mud snails or dog whelks.

== Description ==
The length of the shell varies between 15 mm and 29 mm.

== Distribution ==
This species occurs in the Indian Ocean off Madagascar, Aldabra, Chagos, the Mascarene Basin and Mauritius; in Hawaii (Maui); and in the West Pacific.
