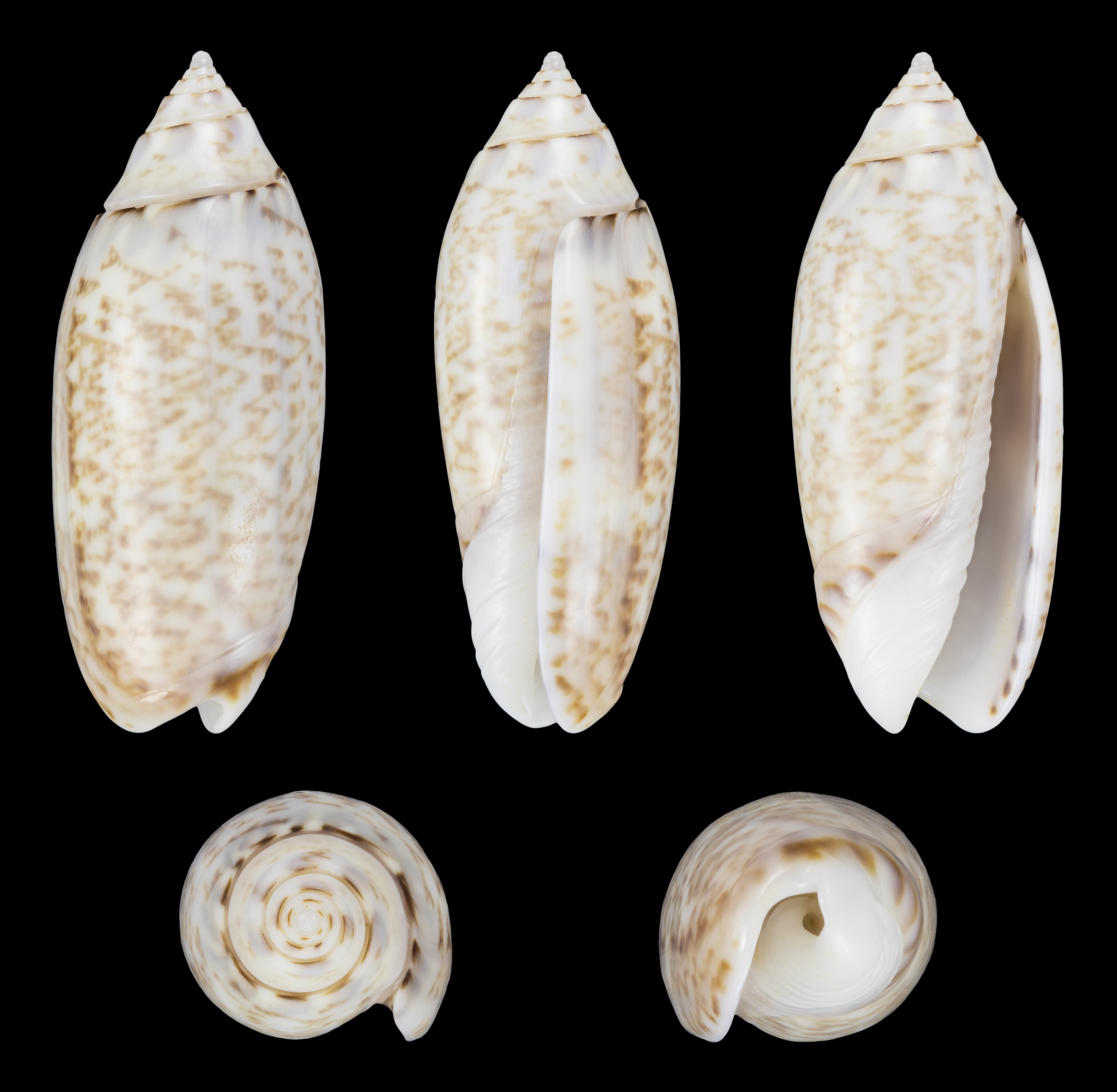
- Shell of Oliva australis

Scientific classification
- Kingdom: Animalia
- Phylum: Mollusca
- Class: Gastropoda
- Subclass: Caenogastropoda
- Order: Neogastropoda
- Family: Olividae
- Genus: Oliva
- Species: O. australis

Binomial name
- Oliva australis Duclos, 1835

Synonyms
- Oliva (Acutoliva) australis Duclos, 1835· accepted, alternate representation

= Oliva australis =

Species of gastropod

Oliva australis (also known as the Southern olive or Olive shell) is a species of sea snail, a marine gastropod mollusk in the family Olividae, the olives.

Subspecies

- Oliva australis australis Duclos, 1835
- Oliva australis pallescens Petuch & Sargent, 1986

== Description ==
This species has a shiny pale elongated shell that is usually decorated by purple zigzag longitudinal lines and altering brown and white markings around the top of the whorls. They can be 3 centimeters in length.

== Distribution ==
This marine species was found in the Atlantic Ocean off the islands Saint Pierre and Miquelon.
