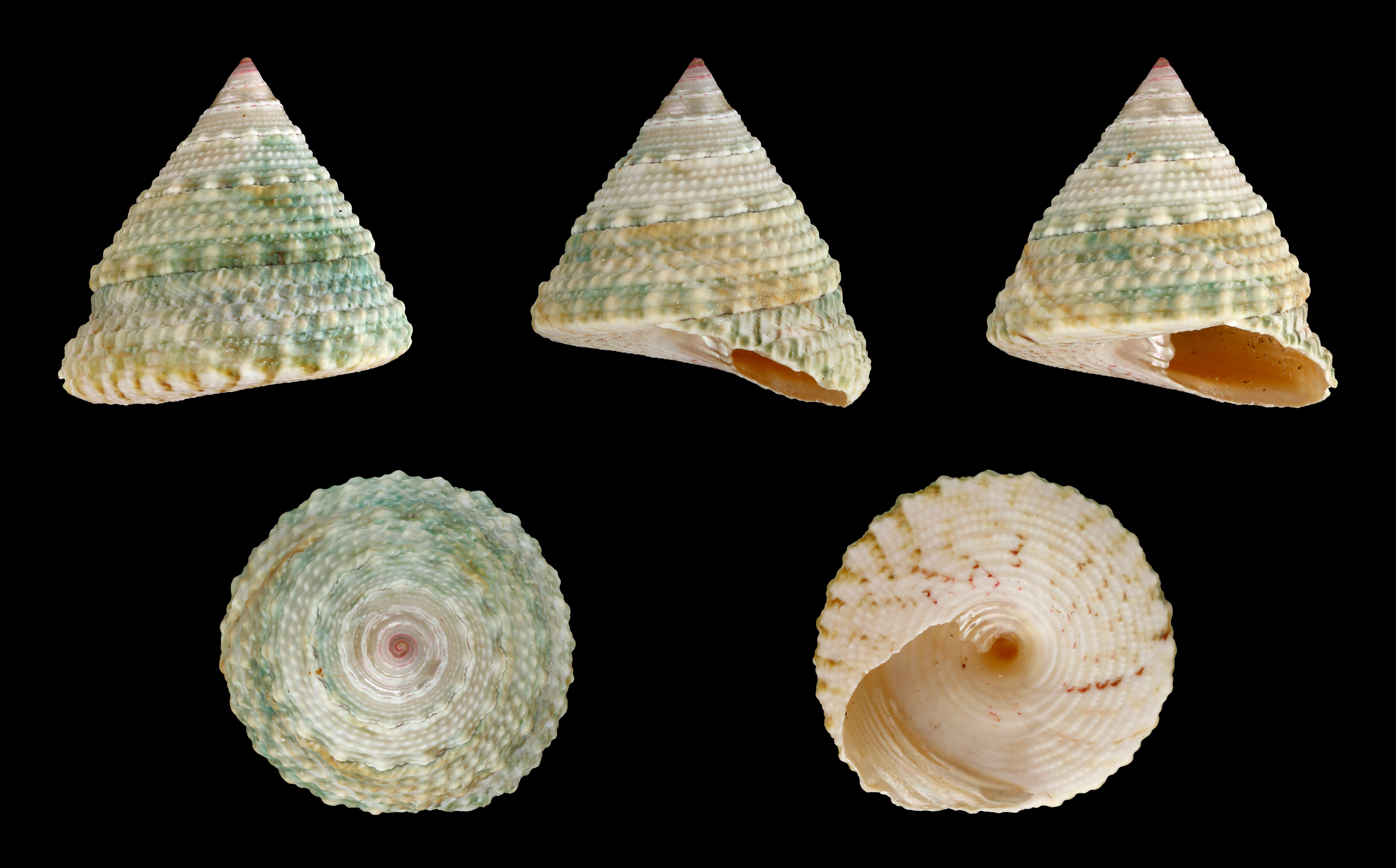

Scientific classification
- Kingdom: Animalia
- Phylum: Mollusca
- Class: Gastropoda
- Subclass: Vetigastropoda
- Order: Trochida
- Superfamily: Trochoidea
- Family: Trochidae
- Genus: Trochus
- Species: T. maculatus

Binomial name
- Trochus maculatus Linnaeus, 1758

Synonyms
- Polydonta gibberula A. Adams, 1853; Tectus maculatus (Linnaeus, 1758); Trochus (Lamprostoma) maculatus Linnaeus, 1758; Trochus callicoccus Philippi, 1849; Trochus gmelini Jonas, 1846; Trochus jonasi Philippi; Trochus rugulosus Koch, 1848; Trochus smaragdus Reeve, 1862; Trochus vernus Gmelin, J.F., 1791; Trochus verrucosus Gmelin, 1791

= Trochus maculatus =

Species of gastropod

Trochus maculatus, common name the maculated top shell, is a species of sea snail, a marine gastropod mollusk in the family Trochidae, the top snails.

== Description ==
The size of the shell varies between 25 mm and 65 mm. This is an excessively variable form. The solid, heavy shell has a conical shape and is falsely umbilicate. The spire is strictly conic, or swollen and somewhat convex below, acuminate above, or sometimes constricted around the upper part of the body whorl. The about 10 whorls are quite planulate, or concave toward the upper, convex toward the lower margins. The body whorl is carinated at the periphery and flat beneath. The color of upper surface consists of longitudinal stripes or flames of brown, purplish, magenta, rose or coral red on a ground of white, corneous, pink or olive-tinted. The flames occupy more space than the ground color or vice versa. Sometimes the coloration consists of very narrow numerous radiating lines, usually broken into tessellations articulating the lirae. The base of the shell is radiately painted with zigzag flames, or more frequently, narrow lines, either continuous or interrupted, often broken into a maculated or a finely tessellated pattern, sometimes unicolored lilac, or even white. The sculpture of the upper surface consists of spiral beaded lirae, usually numbering six to eight on each whorl. The beads are either laterally compressed like longitudinal folds or rounded and separate. The base of the shell is concentrically sculptured with numerous (about 10) fine, more or less beaded lira. The aperture is transverse subtrigonal. The outer lip is lirate within. The basal margin is slightly curved and four or five dentate. The parietal wall is sometimes callused and lirate, sometimes smooth. The heavy columella is subvertical or oblique, its margin irregularly dentate or nearly smooth, usually with a deep notch at its union with the basal lip. The umbilical tract is funnel-shaped, spirally feebly lirate or nearly smooth, not conspicuously bi-lirate.

== Distribution ==
T. maculatus occurs in the Red Sea, the Indo-Pacific Ocean. and Australia (Northern Territory, Queensland, Western Australia).
