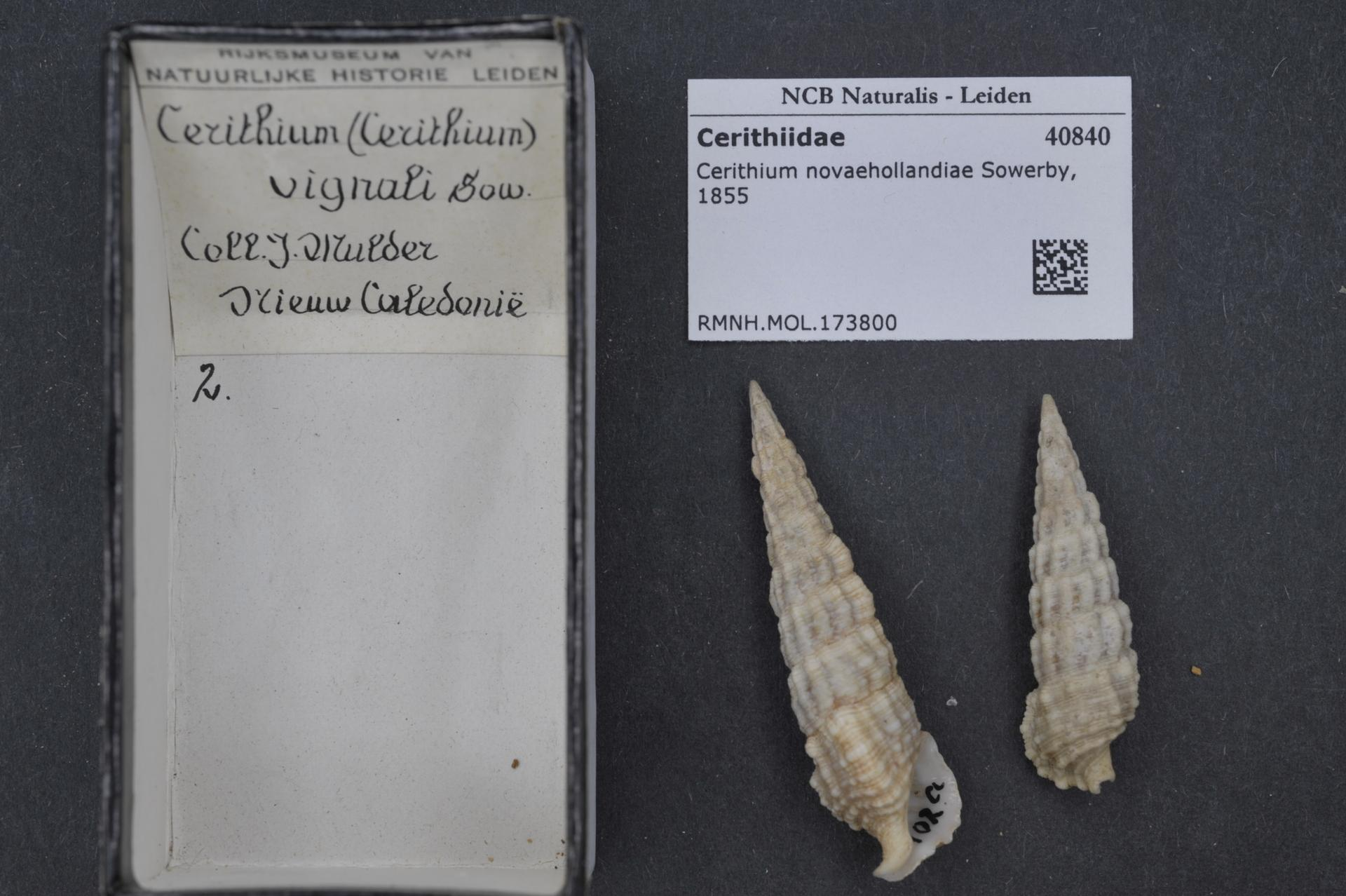
- Shell of Cerithium novaehollandiae (specimen at Naturalis Biodiversity Center) -

Scientific classification
- Kingdom: Animalia
- Phylum: Mollusca
- Class: Gastropoda
- Subclass: Caenogastropoda
- Order: incertae sedis
- Family: Cerithiidae
- Genus: Cerithium
- Species: C. novaehollandiae

Binomial name
- Cerithium novaehollandiae G.B. Sowerby II, 1855

Synonyms
- Cerithium vignali G.B. Sowerby III, 1912

= Cerithium novaehollandiae =

Species of gastropod

Cerithium novaehollandiae is a species of sea snail, a marine gastropod mollusk in the family Cerithiidae.

== Description ==
The length of the shell (incomplete) is 18.7 mm, its diameter 9.4 mm.

The shell is medium in size, flat-sided, slightly turreted. The sculpture consists of strong narrow, slightly curved axial folds that are swollen near the suture, both above and below. The body whorl has three slightly beaded spirals that are more prominent than those intervening, the spiral at the periphery the largest. Below the periphery, on the base, are several prominent spirals, the one nearest the periphery the largest. A broad varix is present on the body whorl opposite the aperture. The inner lip callused and slightly detached.

== Distribution ==
This species occurs from Borneo to New Caledonia; also off Australia (Northern Territory, Queensland, Western Australia)
