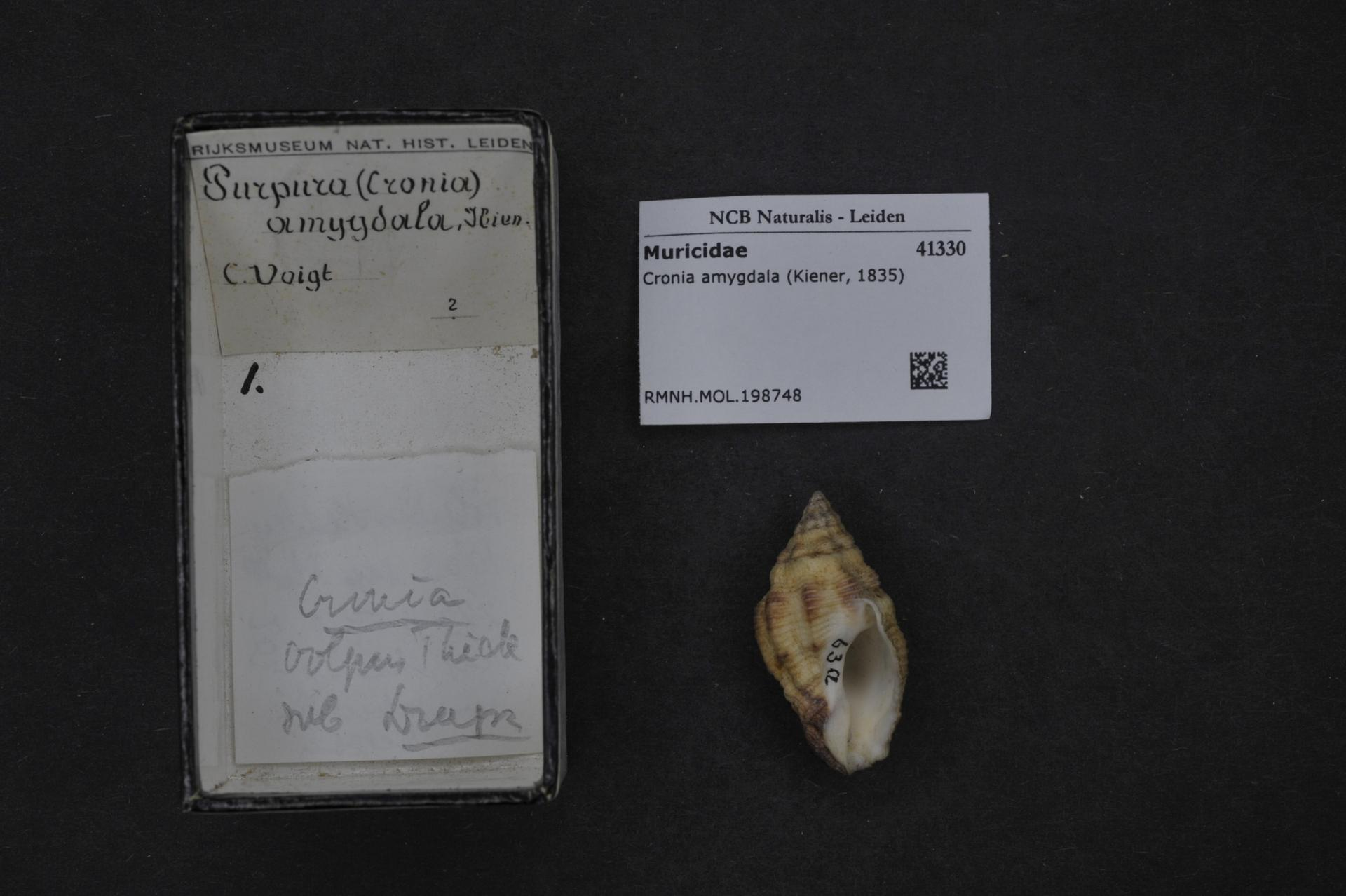
- Cronia amygdala shell

Scientific classification
- Kingdom: Animalia
- Phylum: Mollusca
- Class: Gastropoda
- Subclass: Caenogastropoda
- Order: Neogastropoda
- Superfamily: Muricoidea
- Family: Muricidae
- Subfamily: Ergalataxinae
- Genus: Cronia; H. Adams & A. Adams, 1835

Type species
- Purpura amygdala Kiener, 1835

Synonyms
- Cronia (Cronia) H. Adams & A. Adams, 1853; Morula (Cronia) H. Adams A. Adams, 1853; Purpura (Cronia) H. Adams & A. Adams, 1853 (original rank)

= Cronia =

Genus of gastropods

Cronia is a genus of sea snails, marine gastropod mollusks in the family Muricidae, the murex snails or rock snails.

== Description ==
The shell is ovate. The spire is acuminated. The aperture is moderate. The inner lip is callous at the upper part. The columella is straight and simple anteriorly.

== Species ==
Species within the genus Cronia include:

- Cronia amygdala (Kiener, 1835)
- Cronia aurantiaca (Hombron & Jacquinot, 1853)
- Cronia avellana (Reeve, 1846)
- † Cronia tengawaica Laws, 1933

Species inquirendum

- Cronia obockensis (Jousseaume, 1888)

Species brought into synonymy

- Cronia amygdata [sic]: synonym of Cronia amygdala (Kiener, 1835) (misspelling)
- Cronia avenacea (Lesson, 1842): synonym of Usilla avenacea (Lesson, 1842)
- Cronia contracta (Reeve, 1846): synonym of Ergalatax contracta (Reeve, 1846)
- Cronia coronata (A. Adams, 1853): synonym of Pinaxia coronata A. Adams, 1853
- Cronia crassulnata (Hedley, 1915): synonym of Ergalatax crassulnata (Hedley, 1915)
- Cronia fiscella (Gmelin, 1791): synonym of Muricodrupa fiscellum (Gmelin, 1791): synonym of Murichorda fiscellum (Gmelin, 1791)
- Cronia heptagonalis (Reeve, 1846): synonym of Ergalatax heptagonalis (Reeve, 1846) (synonym)
- Cronia iostoma (A. Adams, 1853): synonym of Murex iostoma A. Adams, 1853: synonym of Spinidrupa euracantha (A. Adams, 1853) (synonym)
- Cronia konkanensis (Melvill, 1893): synonym of Semiricinula konkanensis (Melvill, 1893)
- Cronia latiaxidea (G. B. Sowerby III, 1894): synonym of Lataxiena fimbriata (Hinds, 1844) (synonym)
- Cronia margariticola (Broderip in Broderip & Sowerby, 1833): synonym of Drupella margariticola (Broderip, 1833)
- Cronia marginatra (Blainville, 1832): synonym of Neothais marginatra (Blainville, 1832)
- Cronia martensi (Dall, 1923): synonym of Ergalatax junionae Houart, 2008
- Cronia muricina (Blainville, 1832): synonym of Semiricinula muricina (Blainville, 1832)
- Cronia ochrostoma (Blainville, 1832): synonym of Pascula ochrostoma (Blainville, 1832)
- Cronia ozenneana (Crosse, 1861): synonym of Pascula ozenneana (Crosse, 1861)
- Cronia pseudamygdala (Hedley, 1903): synonym of Cronia aurantiaca (Hombron & Jacquinot, 1848)
- Cronia spinosa (Adams H. & A., 1853): synonym of Morula spinosa (H. Adams & A. Adams, 1853)
- Cronia subnodulosa (Melvill, 1893): synonym of Orania subnodulosa (Melvill, 1893)
- Cronia tosana (Pilsbry, 1904): synonym of Usilla tosana (Pilsbry, 1904)
