= C. aurantiaca =

C. aurantiaca may refer to:

- Caladenia aurantiaca, an orchidoid orchid
- Callosamia aurantiaca, an American moth
- Caloplaca aurantiaca, a lichen found in the United States
- Caloptilia aurantiaca, a leaf miner
- Canna aurantiaca, a garden plant
- Caragana aurantiaca, a flowering plant
- Catocala aurantiaca, an owlet moth
- Cattleya aurantiaca, an epiphytic orchid
- Chrysomphalina aurantiaca, a gilled mushroom
- Coccinia aurantiaca, a scarlet gourd
- Coenyra aurantiaca, a brush-footed butterfly
- Cronia aurantiaca, a sea snail
- Curcuma aurantiaca, a flowering plant
