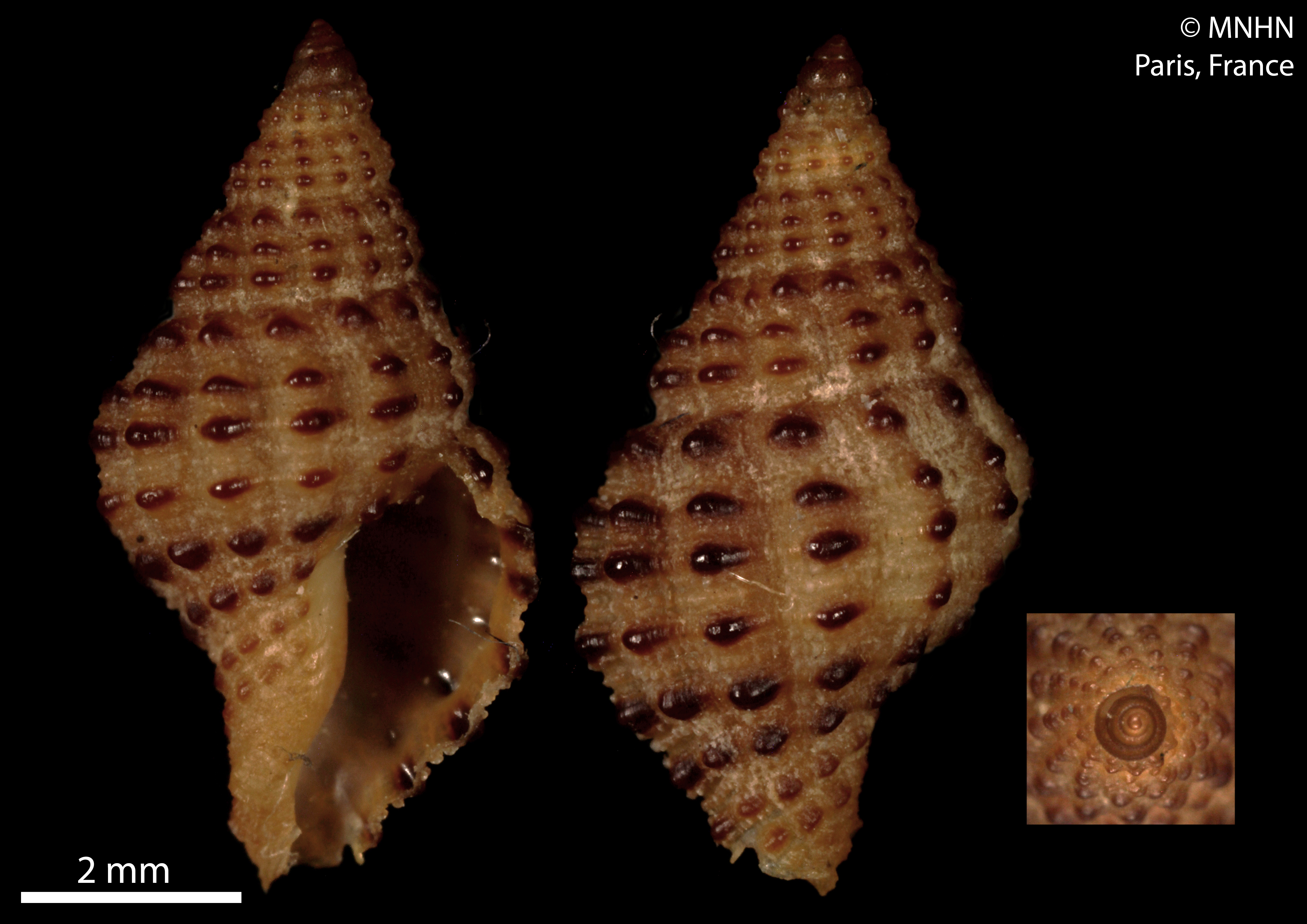
- Trachypollia didyma

Scientific classification
- Kingdom: Animalia
- Phylum: Mollusca
- Class: Gastropoda
- Subclass: Caenogastropoda
- Order: Neogastropoda
- Family: Muricidae
- Subfamily: Ergalataxinae
- Genus: Trachypollia; Woodring, 1928

Synonyms
- Morula (Morunella) Emerson & Hertlein, 1964

= Trachypollia =

Genus of gastropods

Trachypollia is a genus of sea snails, marine gastropod mollusks in the family Muricidae, the murex snails or rock snails.

The classification of this genus is doubtful.

== Species ==
Species within the genus Trachypollia include:

- Trachypollia didyma (Schwengel, 1943)
- Trachypollia lugubris (C.B. Adams, 1852)
- Trachypollia sclera Woodring, 1928
- Trachypollia turricula (Maltzan, 1884)

Species brought into synonymy

- Trachypollia nodulosa Adams: synonym of Morula nodulosa (C. B. Adams, 1845)
