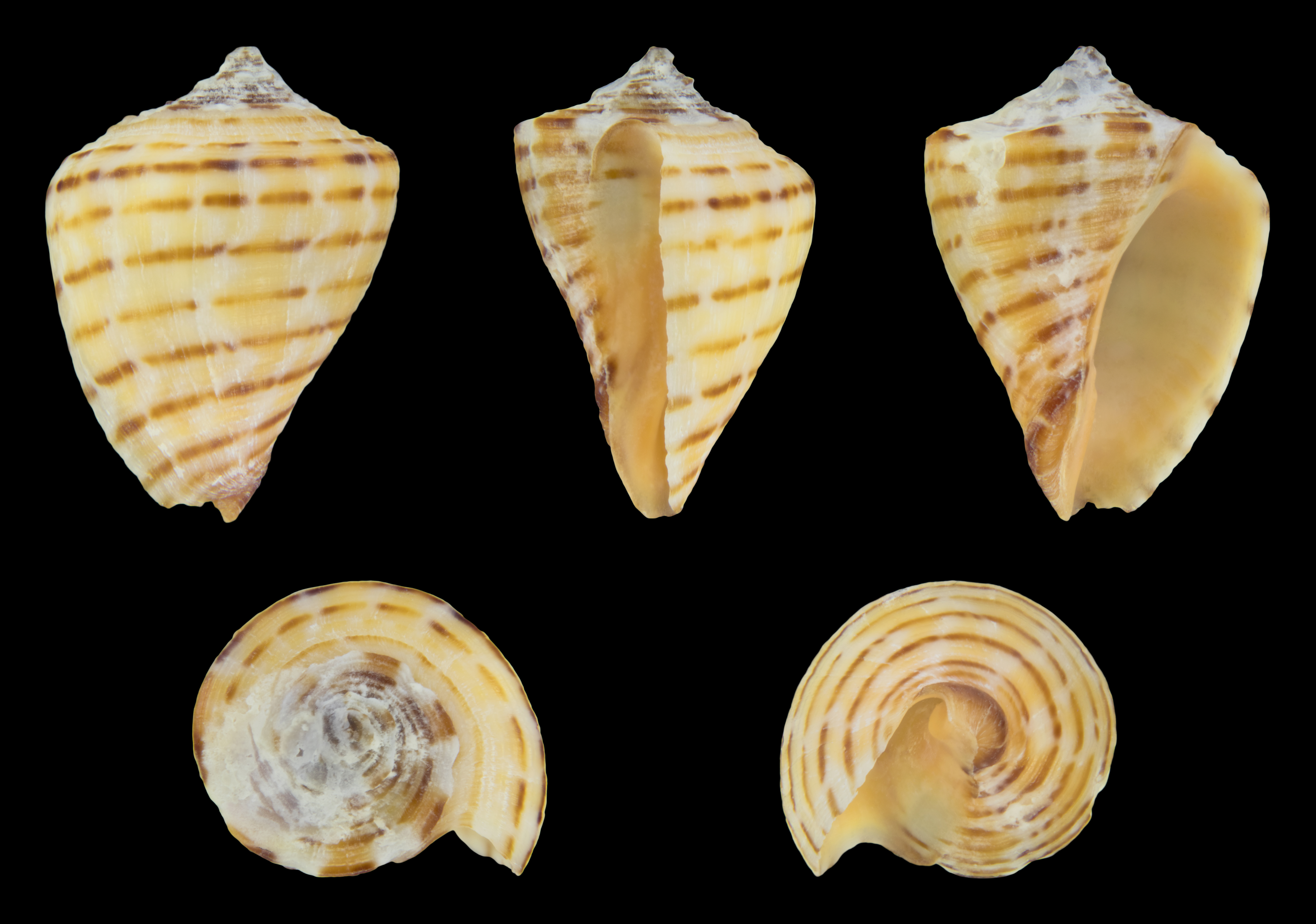

Scientific classification
- Kingdom: Animalia
- Phylum: Mollusca
- Class: Gastropoda
- Subclass: Caenogastropoda
- Order: Neogastropoda
- Family: Muricidae
- Genus: Pinaxia
- Species: P. versicolor

Binomial name
- Pinaxia versicolor (Gray, 1839)

Synonyms
- Pyrula versicolor Gray, 1839

= Pinaxia versicolor =

Species of gastropod

Pinaxia versicolor is a species of sea snail, a marine gastropod mollusc in the family Muricidae, the murex snails or rock snails.
