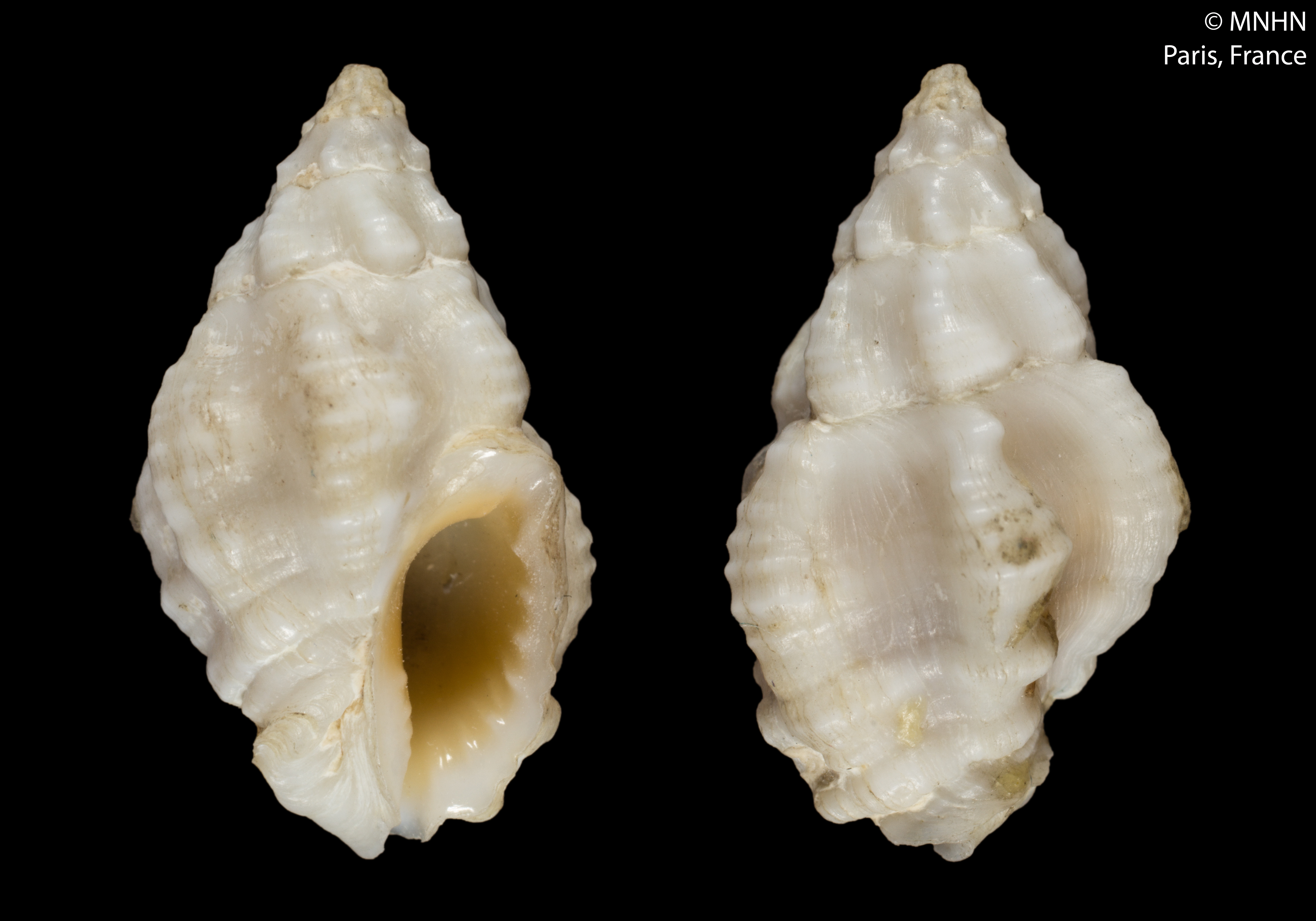
- Pascula ochrostoma

Scientific classification
- Kingdom: Animalia
- Phylum: Mollusca
- Class: Gastropoda
- Subclass: Caenogastropoda
- Order: Neogastropoda
- Superfamily: Muricoidea
- Family: Muricidae
- Subfamily: Ergalataxinae
- Genus: Pascula; Dall, 1908

Type species
- Trophon (Pascula) citricus Dall, 1908

Synonyms
- Evokesia Radwin & D'Attilio, 1972; Trophon (Pascula) Dall, 1908 (original rank)

= Pascula =

Genus of gastropods

Pascula is a genus of sea snails, marine gastropod mollusks in the family Muricidae, the murex snails or rock snails.

== Species ==
Species within the genus Pascula include:

- Pascula citrica (Dall, 1908)
- Pascula darrosensis (E.A. Smith, 1884)
- Pascula muricata (Reeve, 1846)
- Pascula ochrostoma (Blainville, 1832)
- Pascula ozenneana (Crosse, 1861)
- Pascula palmeri (Powell, 1967)
- Pascula philpoppei Houart, 2018
- Pascula rufonotata (Carpenter, 1864)
- Pascula submissa (E. A. Smith, 1903)

Species brought into synonymy

- Pascula ambonensis Houart, 1996: synonym of Cytharomorula ambonensis (Houart, 1996)
- Pascula ferruginosa Reeve, 1846: synonym of Claremontiella nodulosa (C. B. Adams, 1845)
- Pascula lefevreiana (Tapparone-Canefri, 1880): synonym of Cytharomorula lefevreiana (Tapparone-Canefri, 1880)
