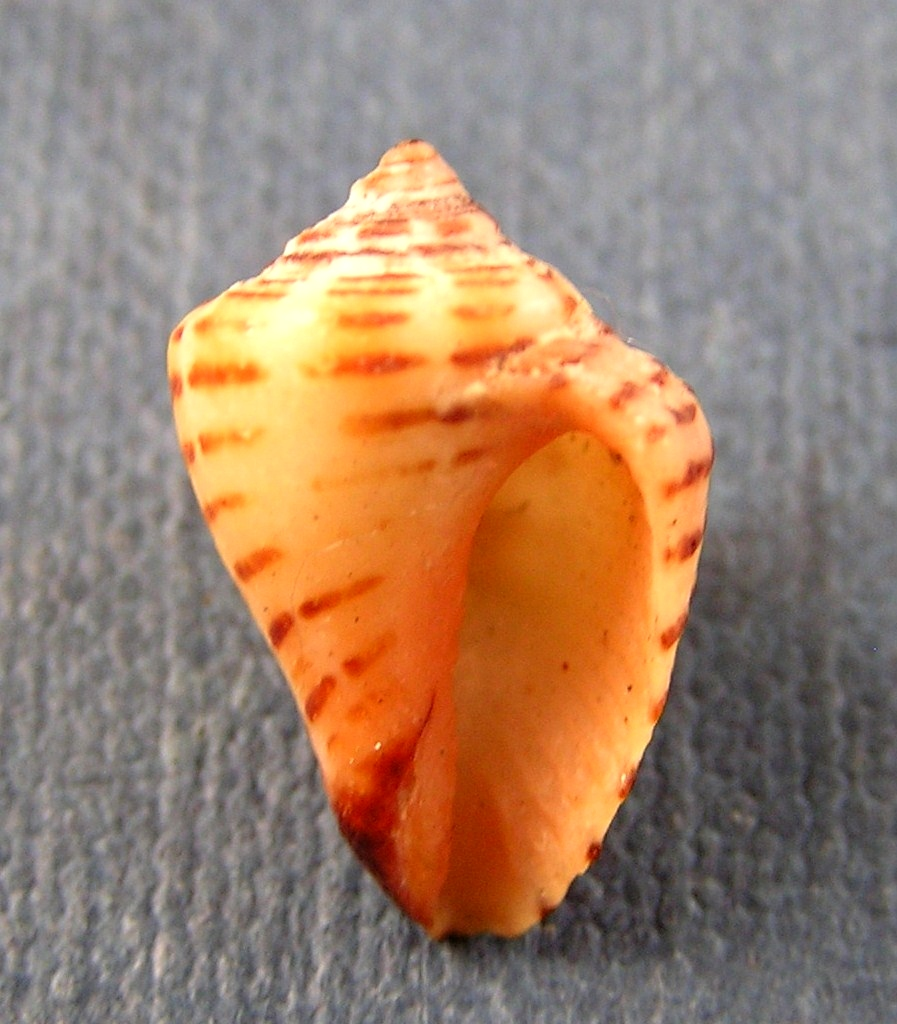
- Pinaxia versicolor

Scientific classification
- Kingdom: Animalia
- Phylum: Mollusca
- Class: Gastropoda
- Subclass: Caenogastropoda
- Order: Neogastropoda
- Superfamily: Muricoidea
- Family: Muricidae
- Subfamily: Rapaninae
- Genus: Pinaxia; Adams & Adams, 1853

Type species
- Pinaxia coronata A. Adams, 1853

Synonyms
- Conothais Kuroda, 1930; Thais (Pinaxia) H. Adams & A. Adams, 1853

= Pinaxia =

Genus of gastropods

Pinaxia is a genus of sea snails, marine gastropod molluscs in the family Muricidae, the murex snails or rock snails.

== Description ==
The shell is conical. The spire is short and acute . The aperture is oval-oblong, emarginate anteriorly. The inner lip is flattened, with several transverse plaits in the middle. The outer lip is acute and grooved internally.

== Species ==
Species within the genus Pinaxia include:

- Pinaxia coronata (H. Adams, 1853)
- Pinaxia versicolor (Gray, 1839)
