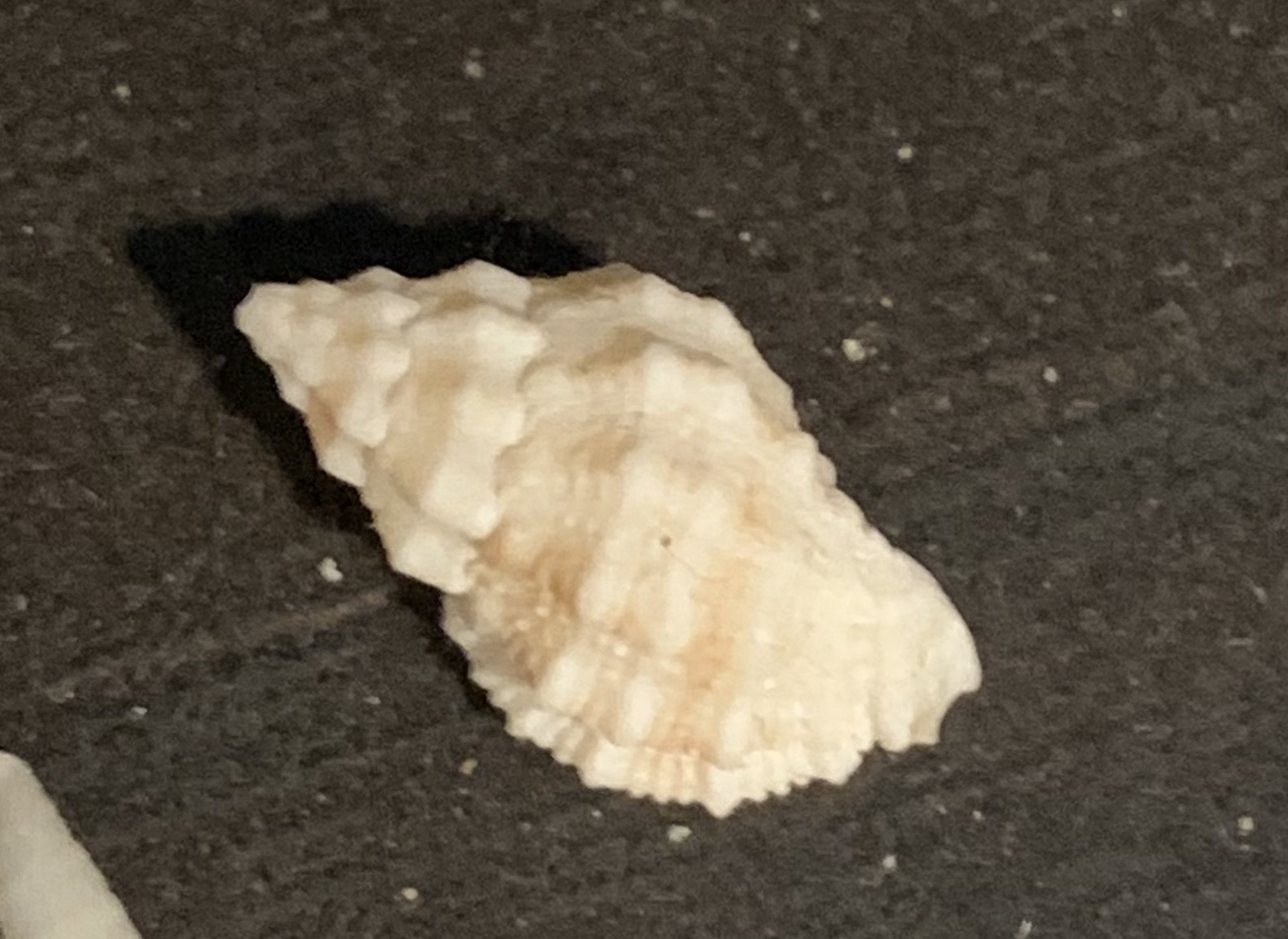

Scientific classification
- Kingdom: Animalia
- Phylum: Mollusca
- Class: Gastropoda
- Subclass: Caenogastropoda
- Order: Neogastropoda
- Family: Muricidae
- Genus: Pascula
- Species: P. muricata

Binomial name
- Pascula muricata (Reeve, 1846)

Synonyms
- Murex nitens A. Adams, 1854; Ricinula muricata Reeve, 1846

= Pascula muricata =

Species of gastropod

Pascula muricata is a species of sea snail, a marine gastropod mollusc in the family Muricidae, the murex snails or rock snails.
