= Cronia tengawaica =

Scientific classification
- Kingdom: Animalia
- Phylum: Mollusca
- Class: Gastropoda
- Subclass: Caenogastropoda
- Order: Neogastropoda
- Superfamily: Muricoidea
- Family: Muricidae
- Subfamily: Ergalataxinae
- Genus: Cronia
- Species: †C. tengawaica

Binomial name
- †Cronia tengawaica Laws, 1933

Extinct species of gastropod

Cronia tengawaica is an extinct species of sea snail, a marine gastropod mollusk, in the family Muricidae, the murex snails or rock snails.

== Distribution ==
This species occurs in New Zealand.
