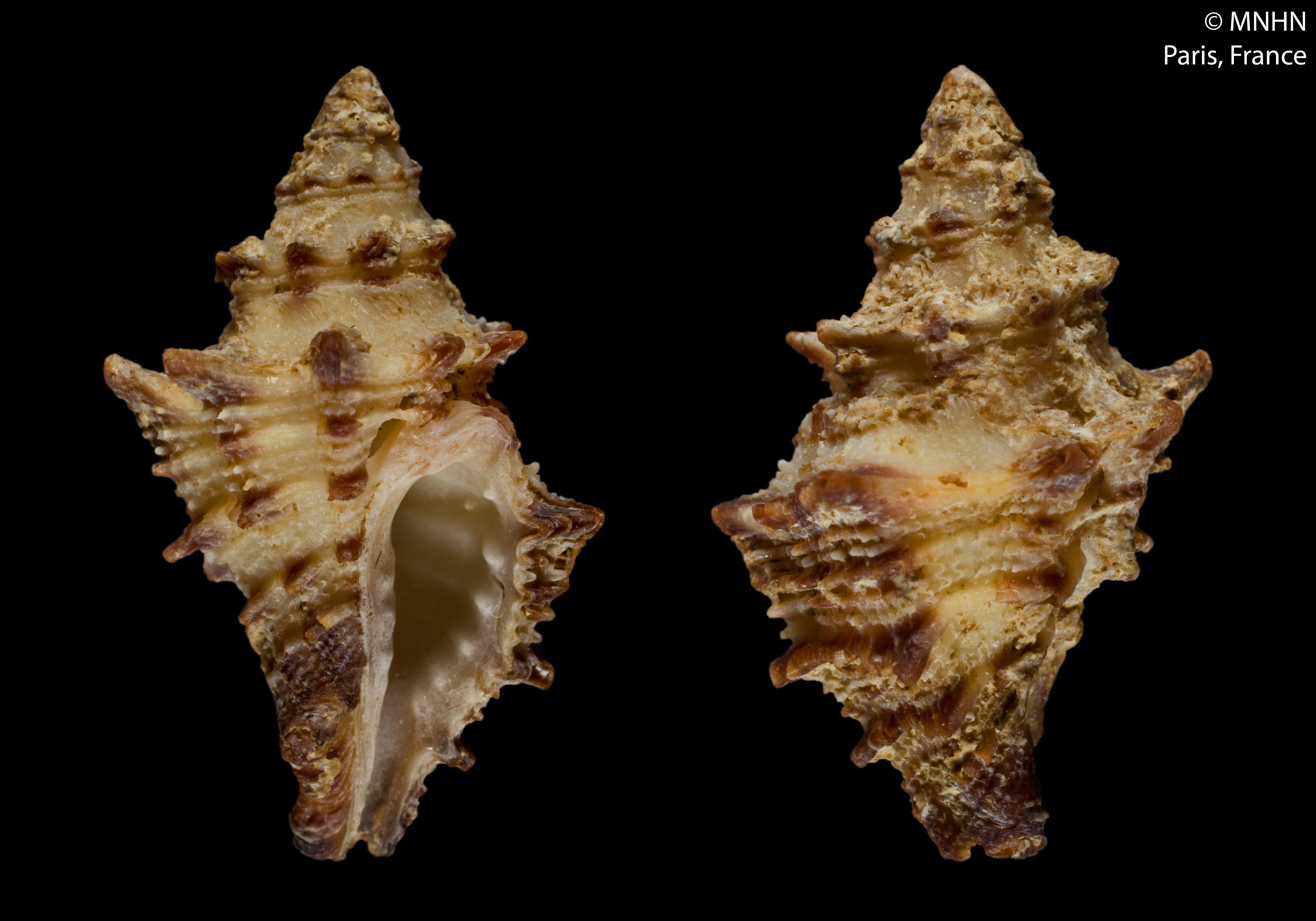
- Shell of Spinidrupa aethes

Scientific classification
- Kingdom: Animalia
- Phylum: Mollusca
- Class: Gastropoda
- Subclass: Caenogastropoda
- Order: Neogastropoda
- Superfamily: Muricoidea
- Family: Muricidae
- Subfamily: Ergalataxinae
- Genus: Spinidrupa; Habe & Kosuge, 1966

Type species
- Murex euracanthus A. Adams, 1853

= Spinidrupa =

Genus of gastropods

Spinidrupa is a genus of sea snails, marine gastropod mollusks in the subfamily Ergalataxinae of the family Muricidae, the murex snails or rock snails.

== Species ==
Species within the genus Spinidrupa include:

- Spinidrupa aethes Houart, 2017
- Spinidrupa euracantha (A. Adams, 1853)
- Spinidrupa infans (E. A. Smith, 1884)
