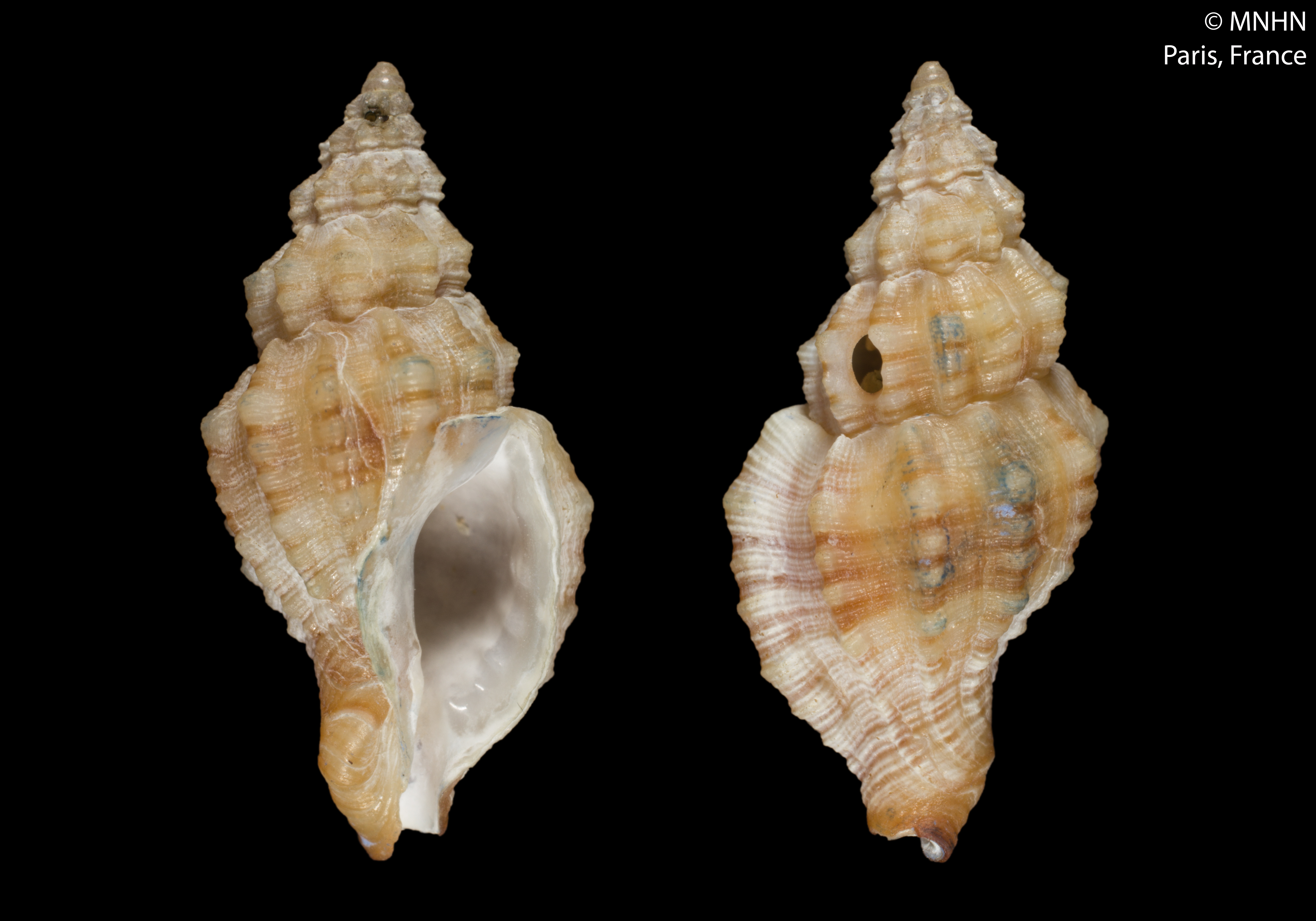

Scientific classification
- Kingdom: Animalia
- Phylum: Mollusca
- Class: Gastropoda
- Subclass: Caenogastropoda
- Order: Neogastropoda
- Family: Muricidae
- Genus: Ergalatax
- Species: E. dattilioi

Binomial name
- Ergalatax dattilioi Houart, 1998

= Ergalatax dattilioi =

Species of gastropod

Ergalatax dattilioi is a species of sea snail, a marine gastropod mollusk in the family Muricidae, the murex snails or rock snails.

This species is a non-broadcast spawner, meaning fertilization occurs more directly rather than through widespread release of gametes into the water column. Its life cycle does not include a trochophore stage, indicating it undergoes direct development rather than passing through a free-swimming larval phase.

== Description ==
The length of the shell attains 16.2 mm.

== Distribution ==
This marine species occurs in the Western Pacific, with recorded occurrences off Japan, the Philippines, and Indonesia. It inhabits tropical benthic environments at depths ranging from 50 to 186 meters
