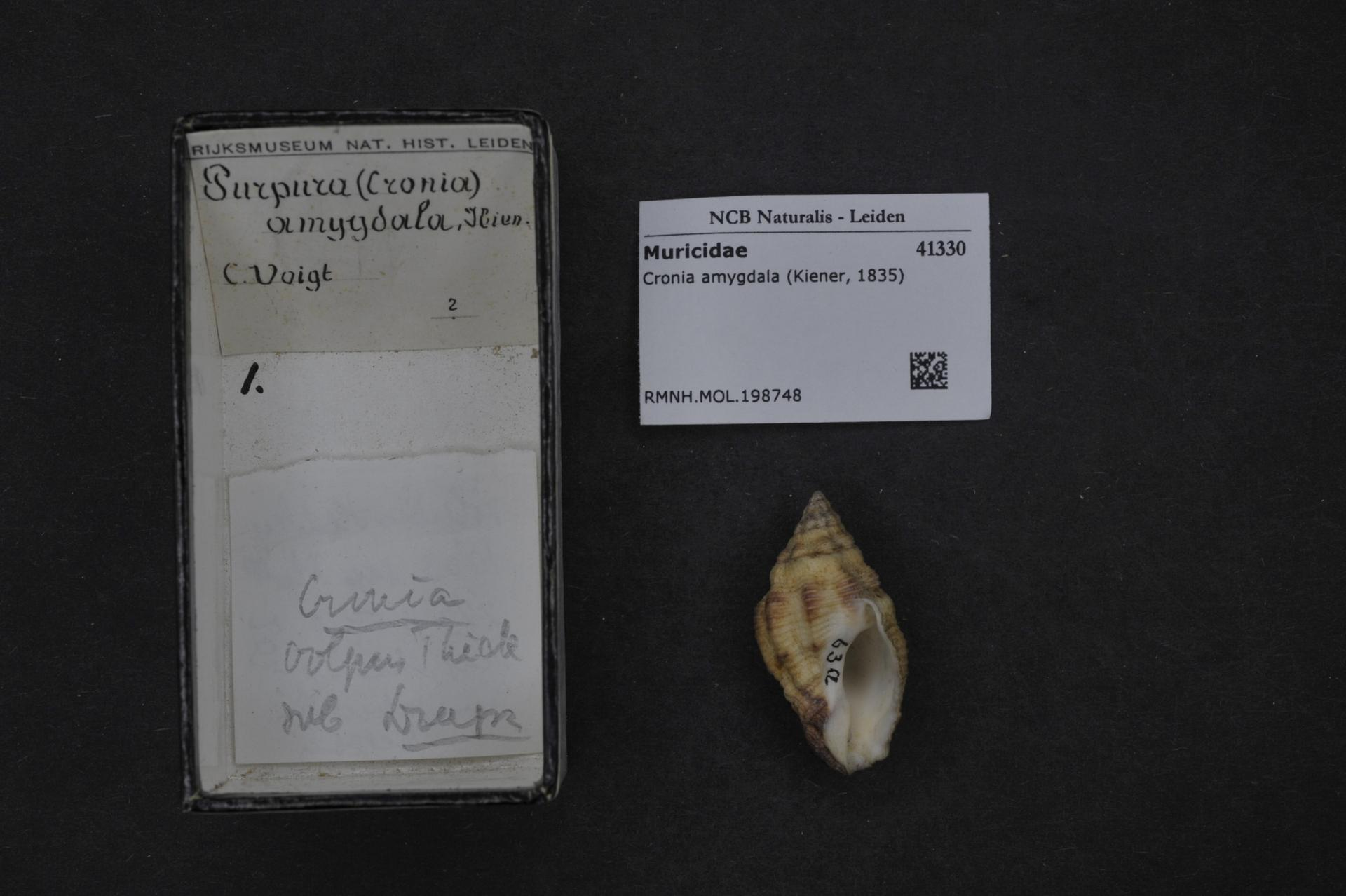
- Cronia amygdala shell

Scientific classification
- Kingdom: Animalia
- Phylum: Mollusca
- Class: Gastropoda
- Subclass: Caenogastropoda
- Order: Neogastropoda
- Family: Muricidae
- Genus: Cronia
- Species: C. amygdala

Binomial name
- Cronia amygdala (Kiener, 1835)

Synonyms
- Purpura amygdala Kiener, 1835

= Cronia amygdala =

Species of gastropod

Cronia amygdala is a species of sea snail, a marine gastropod mollusk in the family Muricidae, the murex snails or rock snails.
