= Coenyra hebe =

Scientific classification
- Domain: Eukaryota
- Kingdom: Animalia
- Phylum: Arthropoda
- Class: Insecta
- Order: Lepidoptera
- Family: Nymphalidae
- Genus: Coenyra
- Species: C. hebe

Binomial name
- Coenyra hebe (Trimen, 1862)

Synonyms
- Yphthima hebe Trimen, 1862

Species of butterfly

Coenyra hebe, the Zulu shadefly, is a butterfly of the family Nymphalidae. It is found in South Africa, in KwaZulu-Natal from Durban north along the coastal plain to Maputaland. It is also found from Greytown to Eswatini and Mpumalanga.

The wingspan is 32–36 mm for males and 34–38 mm for females. Adults are on wing year round (with a peak from November to January).

The larvae probably feed on Poaceae species. Larvae have been reared on Ehrharta erecta.
