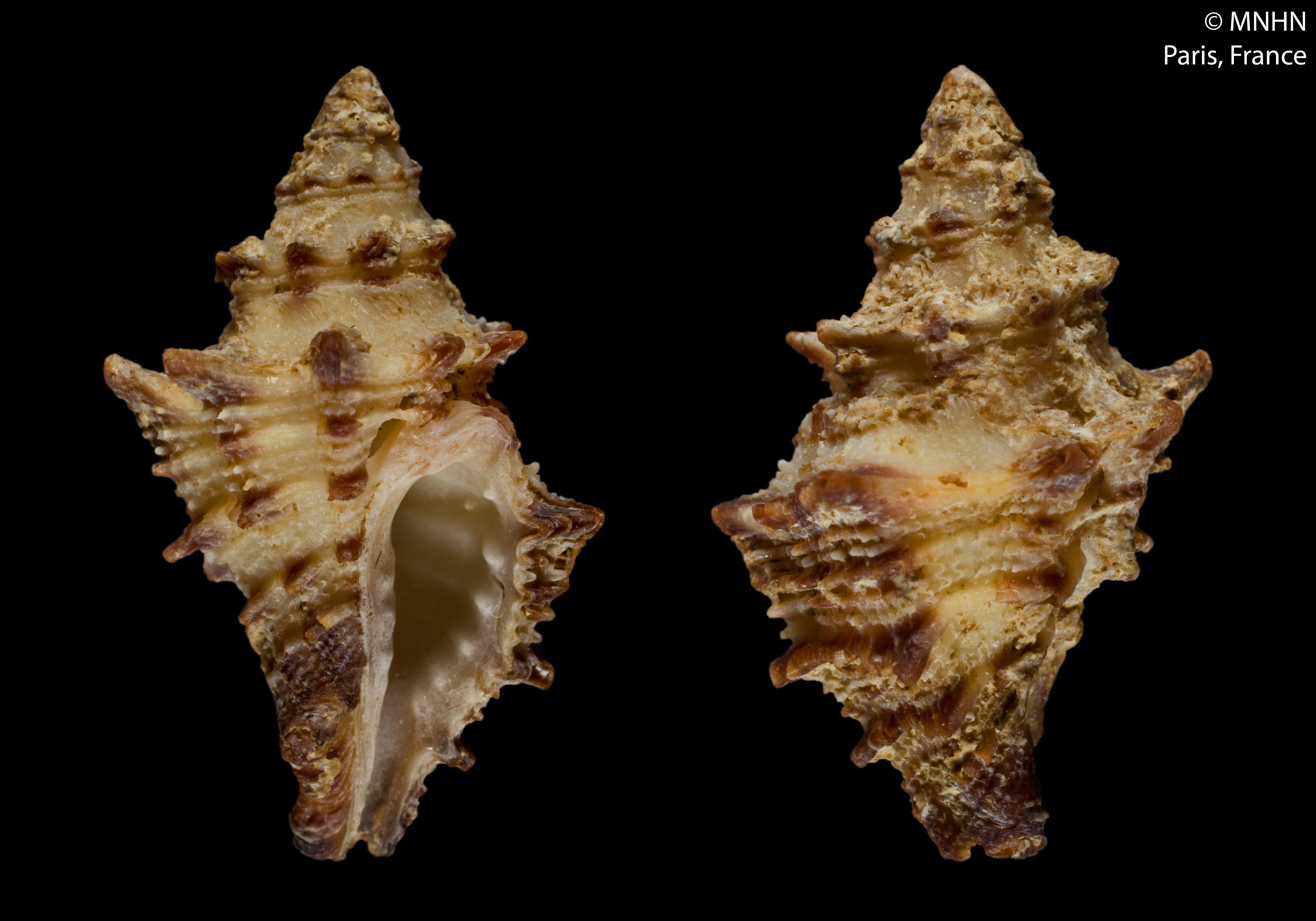
- Shell of Spinidrupa aethes (holotype at MNHN, Paris)

Scientific classification
- Kingdom: Animalia
- Phylum: Mollusca
- Class: Gastropoda
- Subclass: Caenogastropoda
- Order: Neogastropoda
- Family: Muricidae
- Subfamily: Ergalataxinae
- Genus: Spinidrupa
- Species: S. aethes

Binomial name
- Spinidrupa aethes Houart, 2017

= Spinidrupa aethes =

Species of gastropod

Spinidrupa aethes is a species of sea snail, a marine gastropod mollusk, in the family Muricidae, the murex snails or rock snails.

== Description ==
The length of the shell attains 19.8 mm.

== Distribution ==
This marine species occurs in Papua New Guinea.
