= Trachypollia turricula =

Scientific classification
- Kingdom: Animalia
- Phylum: Mollusca
- Class: Gastropoda
- Subclass: Caenogastropoda
- Order: Neogastropoda
- Family: Muricidae
- Genus: Trachypollia
- Species: T. turricula

Binomial name
- Trachypollia turricula (Maltzan, 1884)

Synonyms
- Cantharus subsinuatus Maltzan, 1884; Cantharus turricula Maltzan, 1884 (basionym); Urosalpinx subsinuatus (Maltzan, 1884)

Species of sea snail in the family Muricidae

Trachypollia turricula is a species of sea snail, a marine gastropod mollusk in the family Muricidae, the murex snails or rock snails.It was first described by Maltzan in 1884.
