= Trachypollia sclera =

Scientific classification
- Kingdom: Animalia
- Phylum: Mollusca
- Class: Gastropoda
- Subclass: Caenogastropoda
- Order: Neogastropoda
- Family: Muricidae
- Genus: Trachypollia
- Species: T. sclera

Binomial name
- Trachypollia sclera Woodring, 1928

Species of gastropod

Trachypollia sclera is a species of sea snail, a marine gastropod mollusk in the family Muricidae, the murex snails or rock snails.
