= Trachypollia lugubris =

Scientific classification
- Kingdom: Animalia
- Phylum: Mollusca
- Class: Gastropoda
- Subclass: Caenogastropoda
- Order: Neogastropoda
- Family: Muricidae
- Genus: Trachypollia
- Species: T. lugubris

Binomial name
- Trachypollia lugubris (C.B. Adams, 1852)

Synonyms
- Buccinum lugubre C. B. Adams, 1852; Cantharus exanthematus Dall, 1919; Fusinus orcutti Dall, 1915; Ricinula (Sistrum) rugosoplicata Baker, 1891

Species of gastropod

Trachypollia lugubris is a species of sea snail, a marine gastropod mollusk in the family Muricidae, the murex snails or rock snails.
