= Coenyra rufiplaga =

Scientific classification
- Domain: Eukaryota
- Kingdom: Animalia
- Phylum: Arthropoda
- Class: Insecta
- Order: Lepidoptera
- Family: Nymphalidae
- Genus: Coenyra
- Species: C. rufiplaga

Binomial name
- Coenyra rufiplaga Trimen, 1906

Species of butterfly

Coenyra rufiplaga, the Secucuni shadefly, is a butterfly of the family Nymphalidae. It is found in South Africa, it is widespread in Limpopo from the Waterberg Biosphere and Strydpoortberg to the Wolkberg.

The wingspan is 32–36 mm for males and 34–38 mm for females. Adults are on wing from October to May (with a peak in late summer).

The larvae probably feed on Poaceae species.
