= Pascula citrica =

Scientific classification
- Kingdom: Animalia
- Phylum: Mollusca
- Class: Gastropoda
- Subclass: Caenogastropoda
- Order: Neogastropoda
- Family: Muricidae
- Genus: Pascula
- Species: P. citrica

Binomial name
- Pascula citrica (Dall, 1908)

Synonyms
- Trophon (Pascula) citricus Dall, 1908

Species of gastropod

Pascula citrica is a species of sea snail, a marine gastropod mollusk in the family Muricidae, the murex snails or rock snails.
