= Pascula rufonotata =

Scientific classification
- Kingdom: Animalia
- Phylum: Mollusca
- Class: Gastropoda
- Subclass: Caenogastropoda
- Order: Neogastropoda
- Family: Muricidae
- Genus: Pascula
- Species: P. rufonotata

Binomial name
- Pascula rufonotata (Carpenter, 1864)

Synonyms
- Sistrum rufonotatum Carpenter, 1864

Species of gastropod

Pascula rufonotata is a species of sea snail, a marine gastropod mollusk in the family Muricidae, the murex snails or rock snails.
