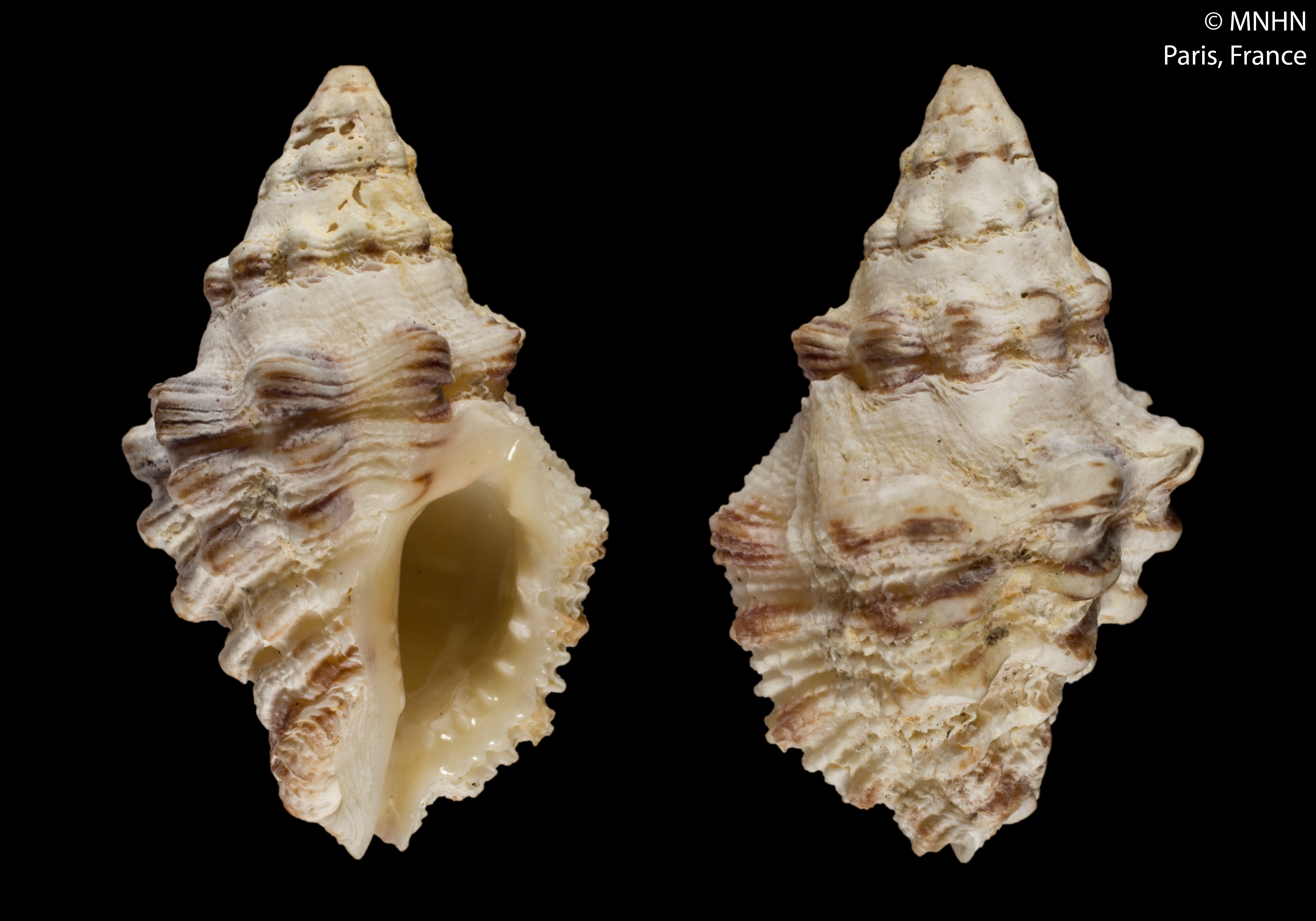

Scientific classification
- Kingdom: Animalia
- Phylum: Mollusca
- Class: Gastropoda
- Subclass: Caenogastropoda
- Order: Neogastropoda
- Family: Muricidae
- Genus: Ergalatax
- Species: E. martensi

Binomial name
- Ergalatax martensi (Schepman, 1892)

Synonyms
- Ergalatax obscura Houart, 1996; Pentadactylus martensi Schepman, 1892

= Ergalatax martensi =

Species of gastropod

Ergalatax martensi is one of the most common and the historic species of sea snail, a marine gastropod mollusk in the family Muricidae, the murex snails or rock snails. Ergalatax Martensi are commonly found within the deep blue sea and some time it gets floated to sea sand due to sea level changes.

Most of Ergalatax Martensi specification are mentioned on World register of Marine Species.

== Description ==
The length of the shell attains 24.2 mm.

== Distribution ==
This marine species occurs in the Strait of Bab-el-Mandeb, Yemen; in the Red Sea, and off Djibouti.
