= Pascula darrosensis =

Scientific classification
- Kingdom: Animalia
- Phylum: Mollusca
- Class: Gastropoda
- Subclass: Caenogastropoda
- Order: Neogastropoda
- Family: Muricidae
- Genus: Pascula
- Species: P. darrosensis

Binomial name
- Pascula darrosensis (E.A. Smith, 1884)

Synonyms
- Murex (Ocinebra) darrosensis E.A. Smith, 1884

Species of gastropod

Pascula darrosensis is a species of sea snail, a marine gastropod mollusk in the family Muricidae, the murex snails or rock snails.
