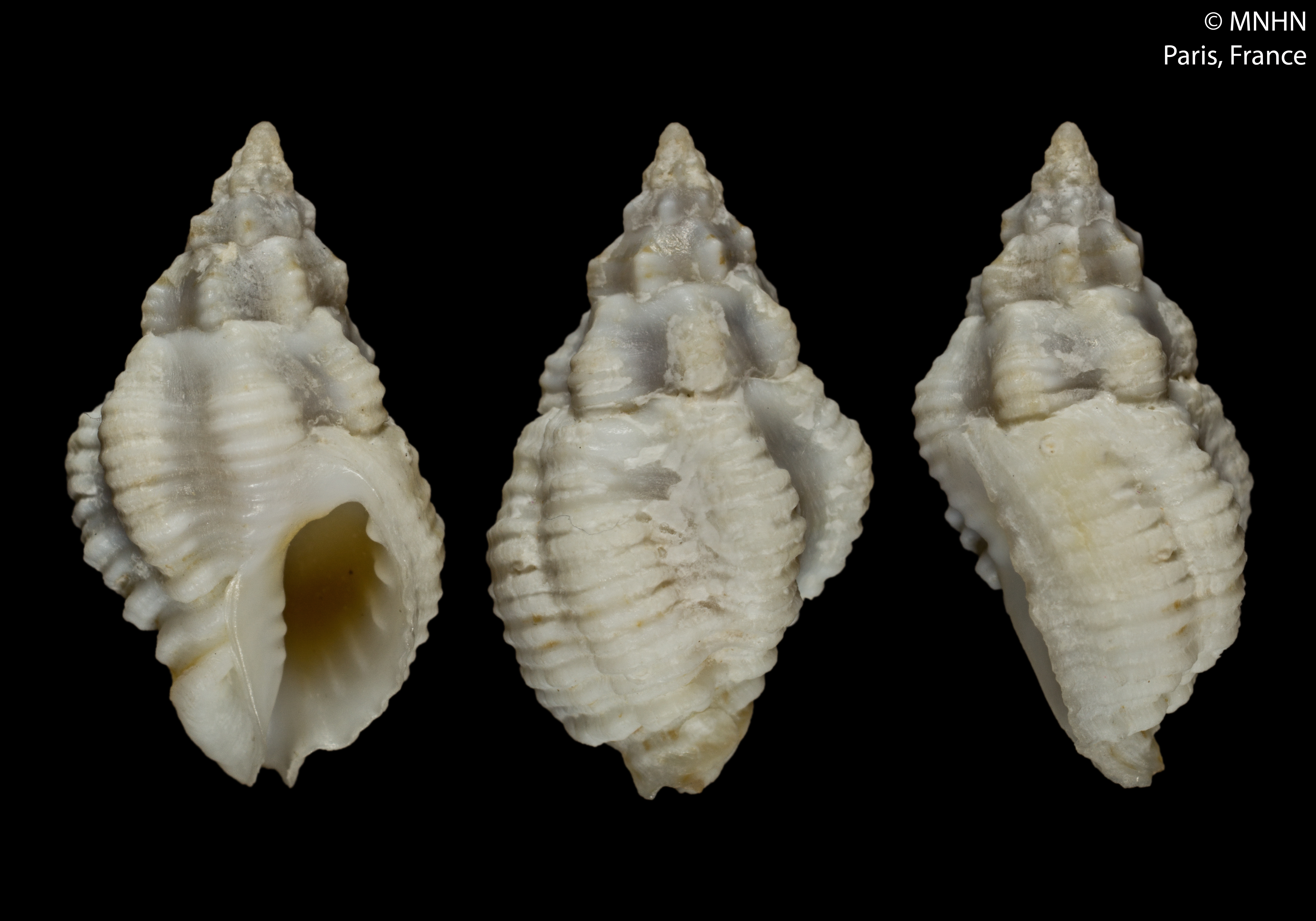
- Shell of Pascula philpoppei (paratype at MNHN, Paris)

Scientific classification
- Kingdom: Animalia
- Phylum: Mollusca
- Class: Gastropoda
- Subclass: Caenogastropoda
- Order: Neogastropoda
- Superfamily: Muricoidea
- Family: Muricidae
- Subfamily: Ergalataxinae
- Genus: Pascula
- Species: P. philpoppei

Binomial name
- Pascula philpoppei Houart, 2018

= Pascula philpoppei =

Species of gastropod

Pascula philpoppei is a species of sea snail, a marine gastropod mollusk, in the family Muricidae, the murex snails or rock snails.

== Distribution ==
This species occurs in the following locations:

- Japan
- Philippines
