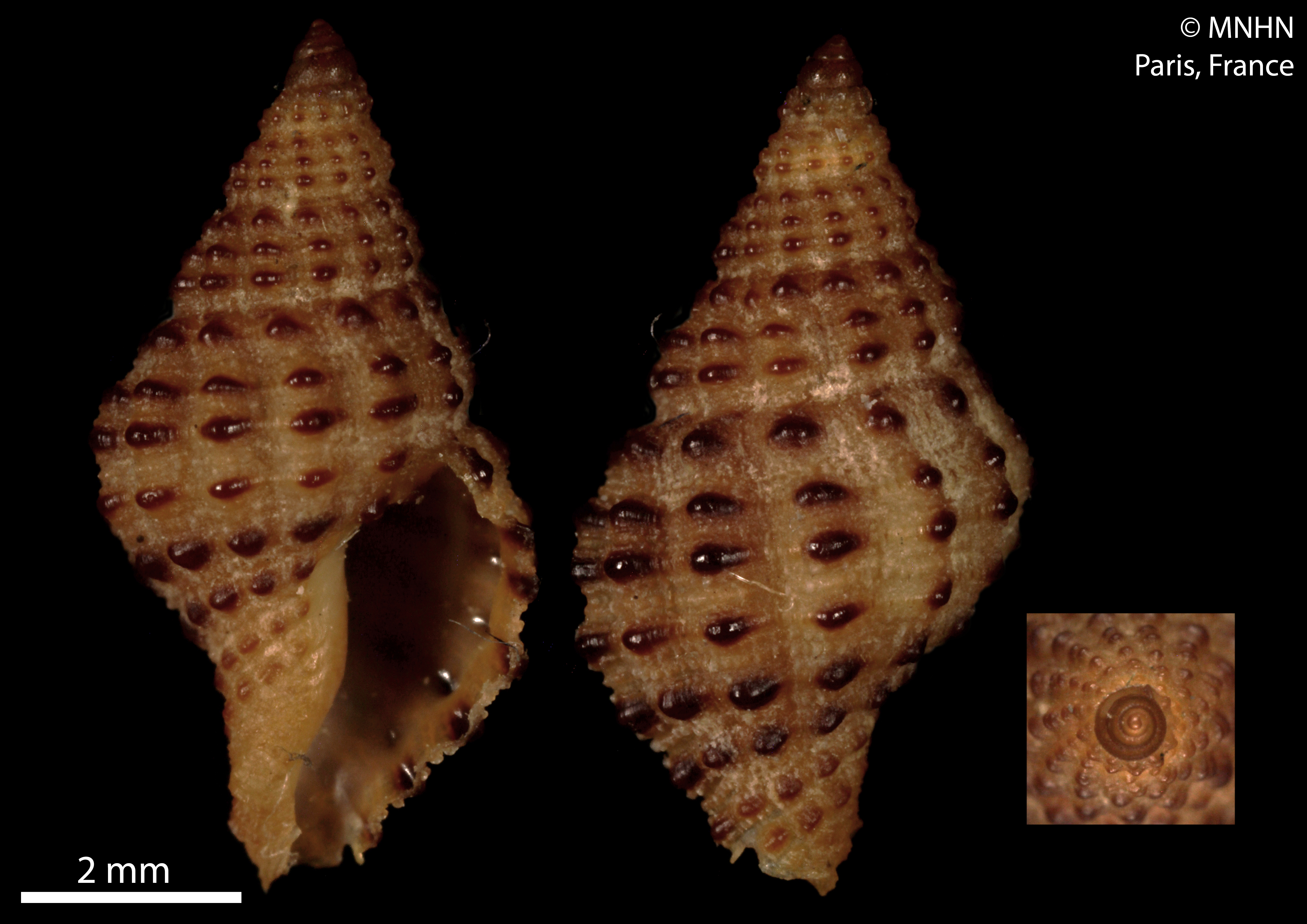
- Shell of Trachypollia didyma (specimen at MNHN, Paris)

Scientific classification
- Kingdom: Animalia
- Phylum: Mollusca
- Class: Gastropoda
- Subclass: Caenogastropoda
- Order: Neogastropoda
- Family: Muricidae
- Genus: Trachypollia
- Species: T. didyma

Binomial name
- Trachypollia didyma (Schwengel, 1943)

Synonyms
- Drupa didyma Schwengel, 1943; Morula didyma (Schwengel, 1943)

= Trachypollia didyma =

Species of gastropod

Trachypollia didyma is a species of small big predatory sea snail, a marine gastropod mollusk in the family Muricidae, the murex snails or rock snails.

== Distribution ==
This marine species occurs off Florida, Bermuda, Martinique and Guadeloupe
