= Coenyra =

Scientific classification
- Kingdom: Animalia
- Phylum: Arthropoda
- Clade: Pancrustacea
- Class: Insecta
- Order: Lepidoptera
- Family: Nymphalidae
- Tribe: Satyrini
- Genus: Coenyra; Hewitson, 1865

Type species
- Yphthima hebe Trimen, 1862

Diversity
- Three species

Synonyms
- Coenura Gaede, 1931 (preocccupied by Coenura Bigot 1857)

Genus of butterflies

Coenyra is a butterfly genus from the subfamily Satyrinae in the family Nymphalidae.

== Species ==
- Coenyra aurantiaca Riley, 1938
- Coenyra hebe (Trimen, 1862)
- Coenyra rufiplaga Trimen, 1906
