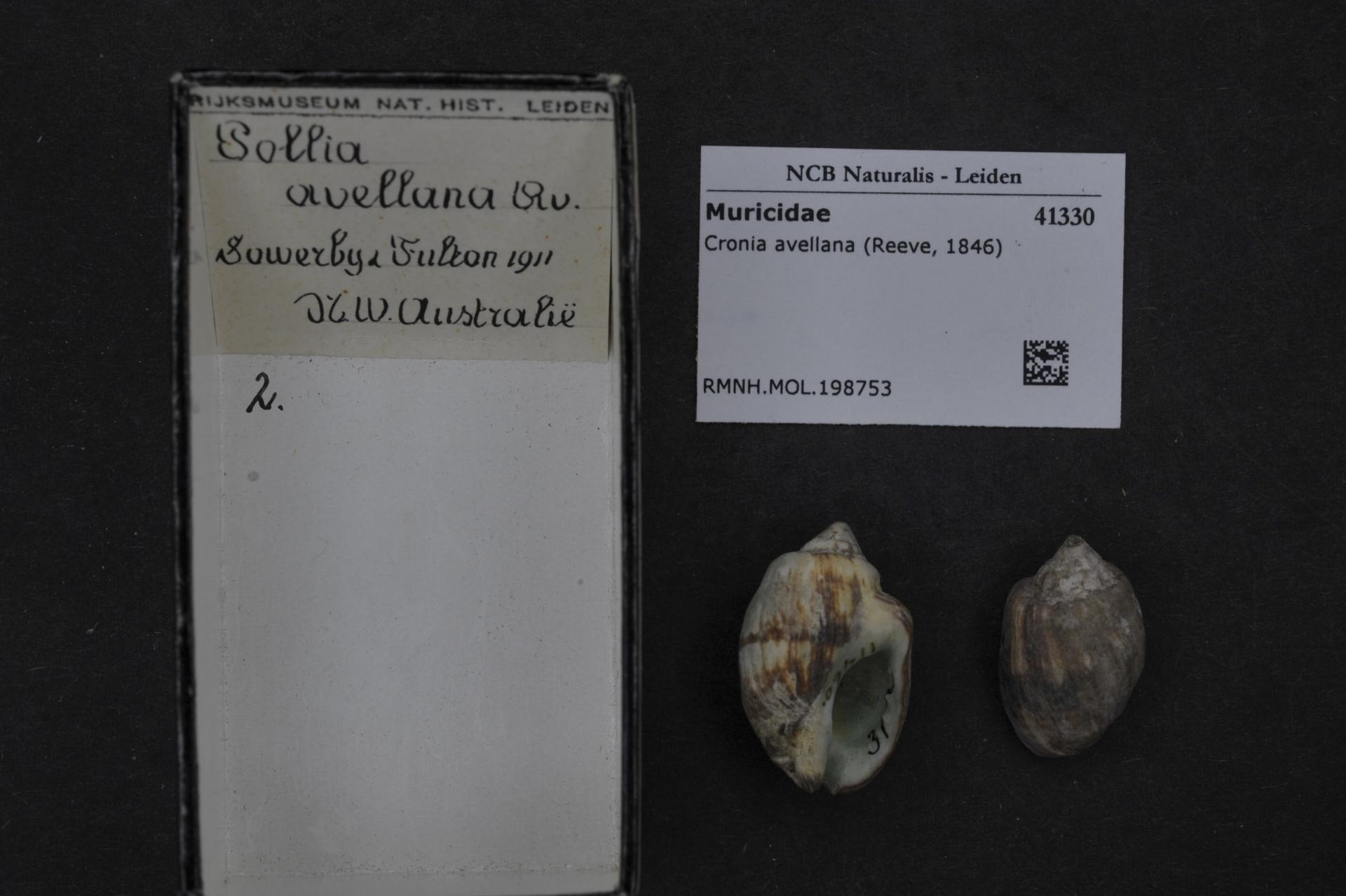
- Cronia avellana shell

Scientific classification
- Kingdom: Animalia
- Phylum: Mollusca
- Class: Gastropoda
- Subclass: Caenogastropoda
- Order: Neogastropoda
- Family: Muricidae
- Genus: Cronia
- Species: C. avellana

Binomial name
- Cronia avellana (Reeve, 1846)

Synonyms
- Buccinum avellana Reeve, 1846

= Cronia avellana =

Species of gastropod

Cronia avellana is a species of sea snail, a marine gastropod mollusk in the family Muricidae, the murex snails or rock snails.
