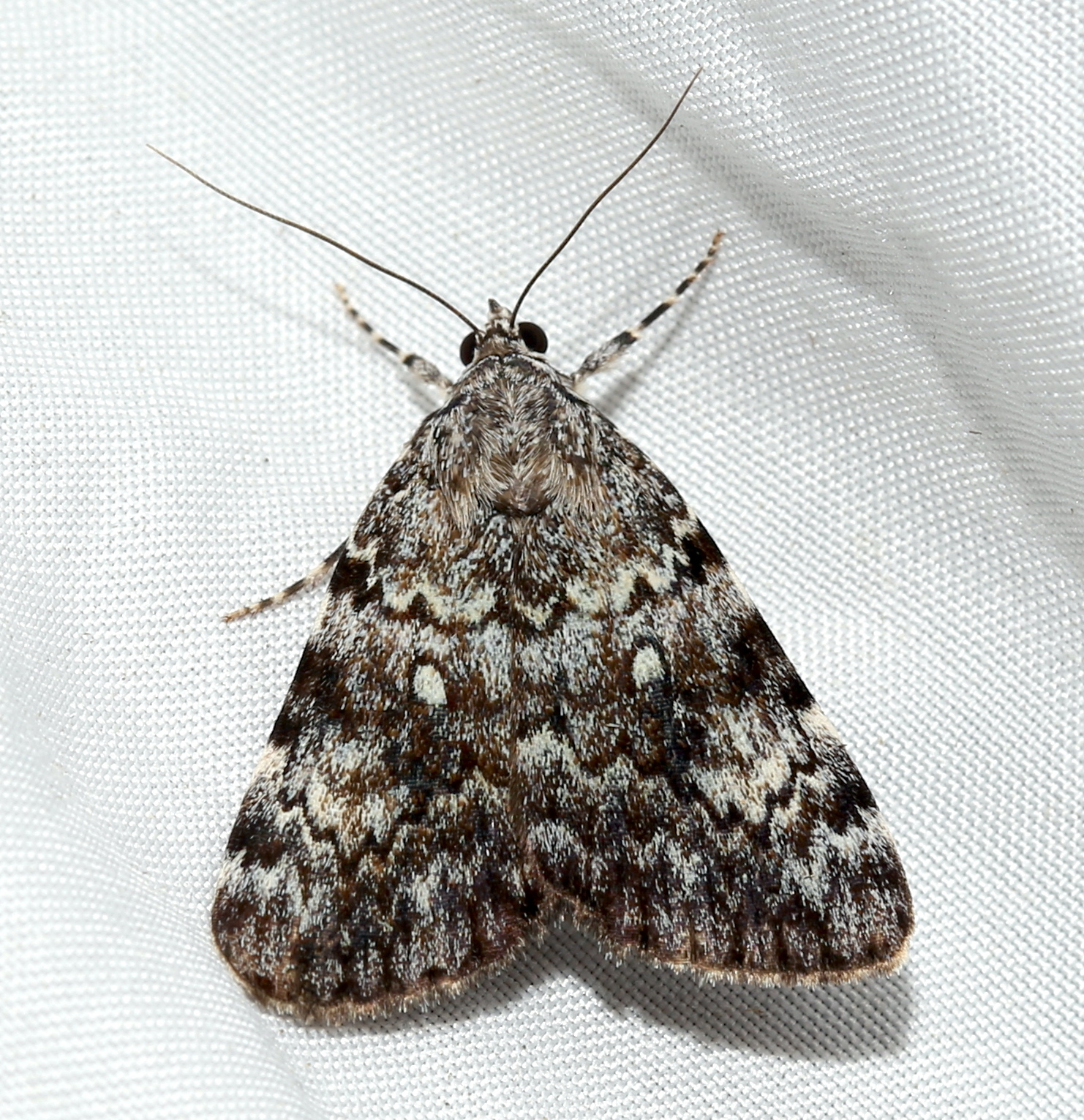

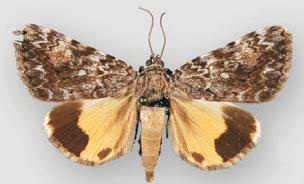

Scientific classification
- Kingdom: Animalia
- Phylum: Arthropoda
- Class: Insecta
- Order: Lepidoptera
- Superfamily: Noctuoidea
- Family: Erebidae
- Genus: Catocala
- Species: C. lineella

Binomial name
- Catocala lineella Grote, 1872

Synonyms
- Catocala amica lineella; Catocala nerissa H. Edwards, 1880; Catocala amica novangliae Reiff, 1916; Catocala curvifascia Brower, 1936; Catocala melanotica Reiff, 1916

= Catocala lineella =

Species of moth

Catocala lineella, the lineella underwing, little lined underwing or steely underwing, is a moth of the family Erebidae. The species was first described by Augustus Radcliffe Grote in 1872. It is found in North America from Ontario and Quebec south to Florida west to Texas and north to Ohio.

It was considered to be a subspecies or even a synonym of Catocala amica for a long time.

The wingspan is 35–40 mm. Adults are on wing from July to August.

The larvae feed on the leaves of Quercus species.
