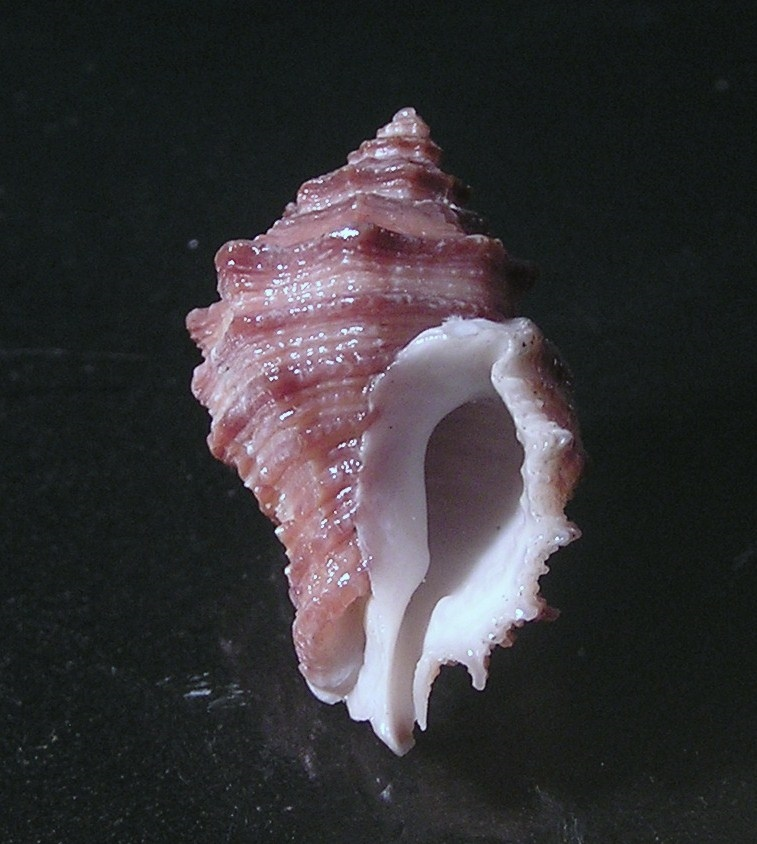
- Ergalatax crassulnata

Scientific classification
- Kingdom: Animalia
- Phylum: Mollusca
- Class: Gastropoda
- Subclass: Caenogastropoda
- Order: Neogastropoda
- Superfamily: Muricoidea
- Family: Muricidae
- Subfamily: Ergalataxinae
- Genus: Ergalatax; Iredale, 1931

Type species
- Ergalatax recurrens Iredale, 1931

Synonyms
- Cronia (Ergalatax)

= Ergalatax =

Genus of gastropods

Ergalatax is a genus of sea snails, marine gastropod mollusks in the subfamily Ergalataxinae of the family Muricidae, the murex snails or rock snails.

== Species ==
Species within the genus Ergalatax include:

- Ergalatax contracta (Reeve, 1846)
- Ergalatax crassulnata (Hedley, 1915)
- Ergalatax dattilioi Houart, 1998
- Ergalatax heptagonalis (Reeve, 1846)
- Ergalatax junionae Houart, 2008
- Ergalatax margariticola (Broderip, in Broderip & Sowerby, 1833)
- Ergalatax martensi (Schepman, 1892)
- Ergalatax pauper (Watson, 1883)
- Ergalatax tokugawai Kuroda & Habe, 1971
- Ergalatax zebra Houart, 1995

Species brought into synonymy

- Ergalatax margariticola (Broderip in Broderip & Sowerby, 1833): synonym of Drupella margariticola (Broderip, 1833)
- Ergalatax martensi (Dall, 1923): synonym of Ergalatax junionae Houart, 2008 (secondary homonym of Ergalatax martensi (Schepman, 1892); Ergalatax junionae Houart, 2008 is a replacement name)
- Ergalatax obscura Houart, 1996: synonym of Ergalatax martensi (Schepman, 1892) (synonym)
- Ergalatax purpureus Kuroda & Habe, 1961: synonym of Orania purpurea (Kuroda & Habe, 1961) (original combination)
- Ergalatax recurrens Iredale, 1931: synonym of Ergalatax pauper (R. B. Watson, 1883)
