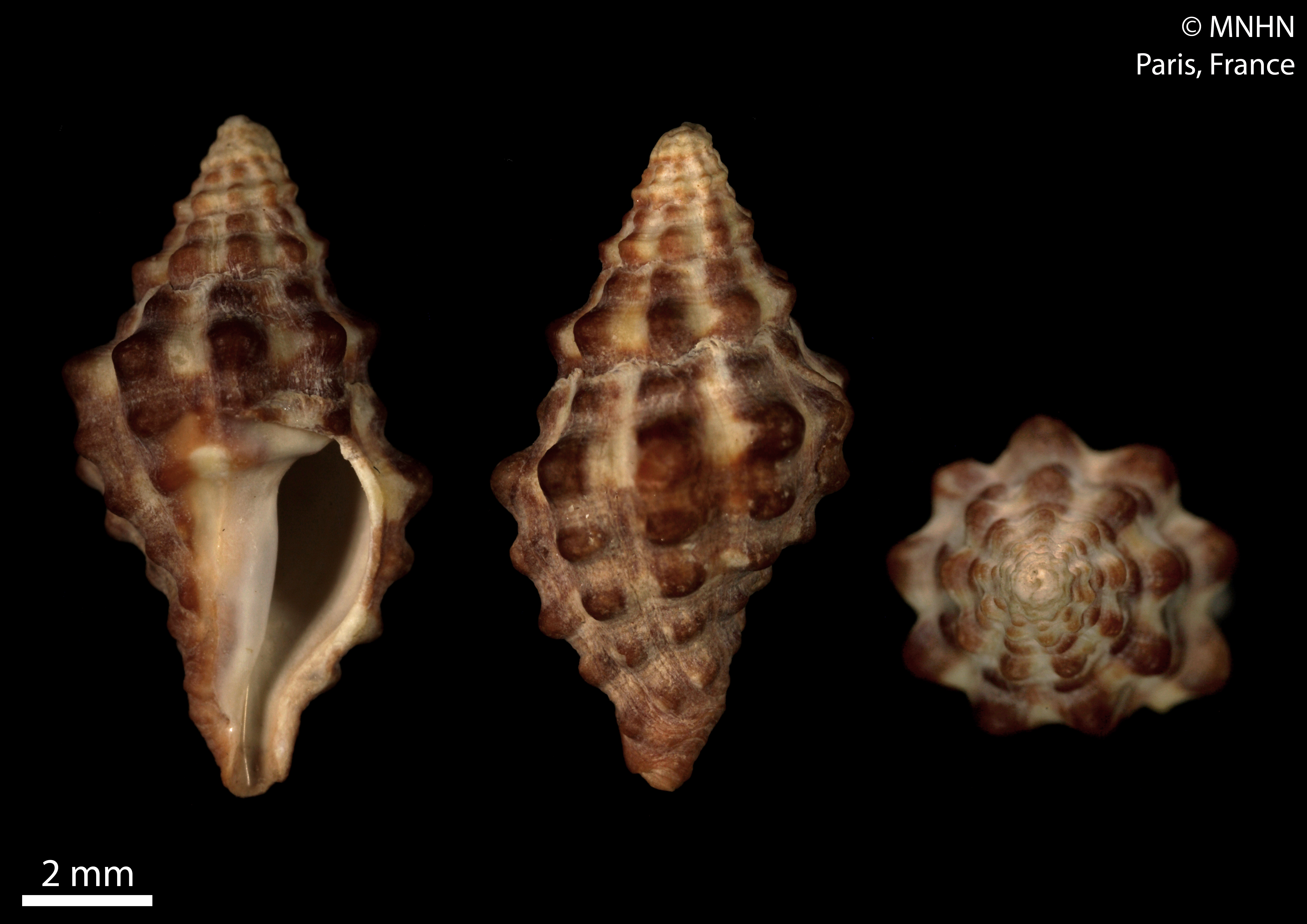
- Shell of Claremontiella nodulosa (specimen at MNHN, Paris)

Scientific classification
- Kingdom: Animalia
- Phylum: Mollusca
- Class: Gastropoda
- Subclass: Caenogastropoda
- Order: Neogastropoda
- Superfamily: Muricoidea
- Family: Muricidae
- Subfamily: Ergalataxinae
- Genus: Claremontiella; Houart, Zuccon & Puillandre, 2019

Type species
- Purpura nodulosa C. B. Adams, 1845

= Claremontiella =

Genus of sea-snails

Claremontiella is a genus of small, predatory sea snails, related to the genera Tenguella and Muricodrupa. Its members are marine gastropod molluscs in the family Muricidae, the murex snails or rock snails.

In 2013, genetic analysis indicated that Morula nodulosa was not closely related to the main group of Morula species, but rather was sister to a Tenguella–Muricodrupa clade. In response, the new genus Claremontiella was proposed in 2019, including C. nodulosa as type species, its close relative C. consanguinea, (Note: C. consanguinea was previously Morula consanguinea. It is not clear whether C. consanguinea and C. nodulosa should be treated as one or two species. Houart et al. write "Further analyses are needed before making a final decision. In the meantime C. consanguinea is here provisionally retained as a valid species.") and a newly-described species: C. adiakritos.

Claremontiella is named in honor of researcher Martine Claremont.

== Species ==
- Claremontiella adiakritos Houart, Zuccon & Puillandre, 2019
- Claremontiella consanguinea (E. A. Smith, 1890)
- Claremontiella nodulosa (C. B. Adams, 1845)
