= Ergalatax pauper =

Scientific classification
- Kingdom: Animalia
- Phylum: Mollusca
- Class: Gastropoda
- Subclass: Caenogastropoda
- Order: Neogastropoda
- Family: Muricidae
- Genus: Ergalatax
- Species: E. pauper

Binomial name
- Ergalatax pauper (Watson, 1883)

Synonyms
- Ergalatax recurrens Iredale, 1931; Murex pauper Watson, 1883

Species of gastropod

Ergalatax pauper is a species of sea snail, a marine gastropod mollusk in the family Muricidae, the murex snails or rock snails.
