= Pascula submissa =

Scientific classification
- Kingdom: Animalia
- Phylum: Mollusca
- Class: Gastropoda
- Subclass: Caenogastropoda
- Order: Neogastropoda
- Family: Muricidae
- Genus: Pascula
- Species: P. submissa

Binomial name
- Pascula submissa (E. A. Smith, 1903)

Synonyms
- Murex submissus E. A. Smith, 1903

Species of gastropod

Pascula submissa is a species of sea snail, a marine gastropod mollusk in the family Muricidae, the murex snails or rock snails.
