= Spinidrupa infans =

Scientific classification
- Kingdom: Animalia
- Phylum: Mollusca
- Class: Gastropoda
- Subclass: Caenogastropoda
- Order: Neogastropoda
- Superfamily: Muricoidea
- Family: Muricidae
- Subfamily: Ergalataxinae
- Genus: Spinidrupa
- Species: S. infans

Binomial name
- Spinidrupa infans (E. A. Smith, 1884)

Synonyms
- Drupa squamilirata (E. A. Smith, 1903); Morula squamilirata (E. A. Smith, 1903); Murex (Ocenebra) infans E. A. Smith, 1884; Murex infans E. A. Smith, 1884; Orania infans (E. A. Smith, 1884); Sistrum squamiliratum E. A. Smith, 1903

Species of gastropod

Spinidrupa infans is a species of sea snail, a marine gastropod mollusk, in the family Muricidae, the murex snails or rock snails.

== Distribution ==
This species occurs in Oman.
