= Claremontiella consanguinea =

Scientific classification
- Kingdom: Animalia
- Phylum: Mollusca
- Class: Gastropoda
- Subclass: Caenogastropoda
- Order: Neogastropoda
- Family: Muricidae
- Genus: Claremontiella
- Species: C. consanguinea

Binomial name
- Claremontiella consanguinea (Smith, 1890)

Synonyms
- Cantharus (Tritonidea) consanguineus Smith, 1890; Morula (Morula) consanguinea (E. A. Smith, 1890); Morula consanguinea (E. A. Smith, 1890)

Species of gastropod

Claremontiella consanguinea is a species of sea snail, a marine gastropod mollusk in the family Muricidae, the murex snails or rock snails.

== Distribution ==
This species occurs in the Atlantic Ocean off St. Helena.
