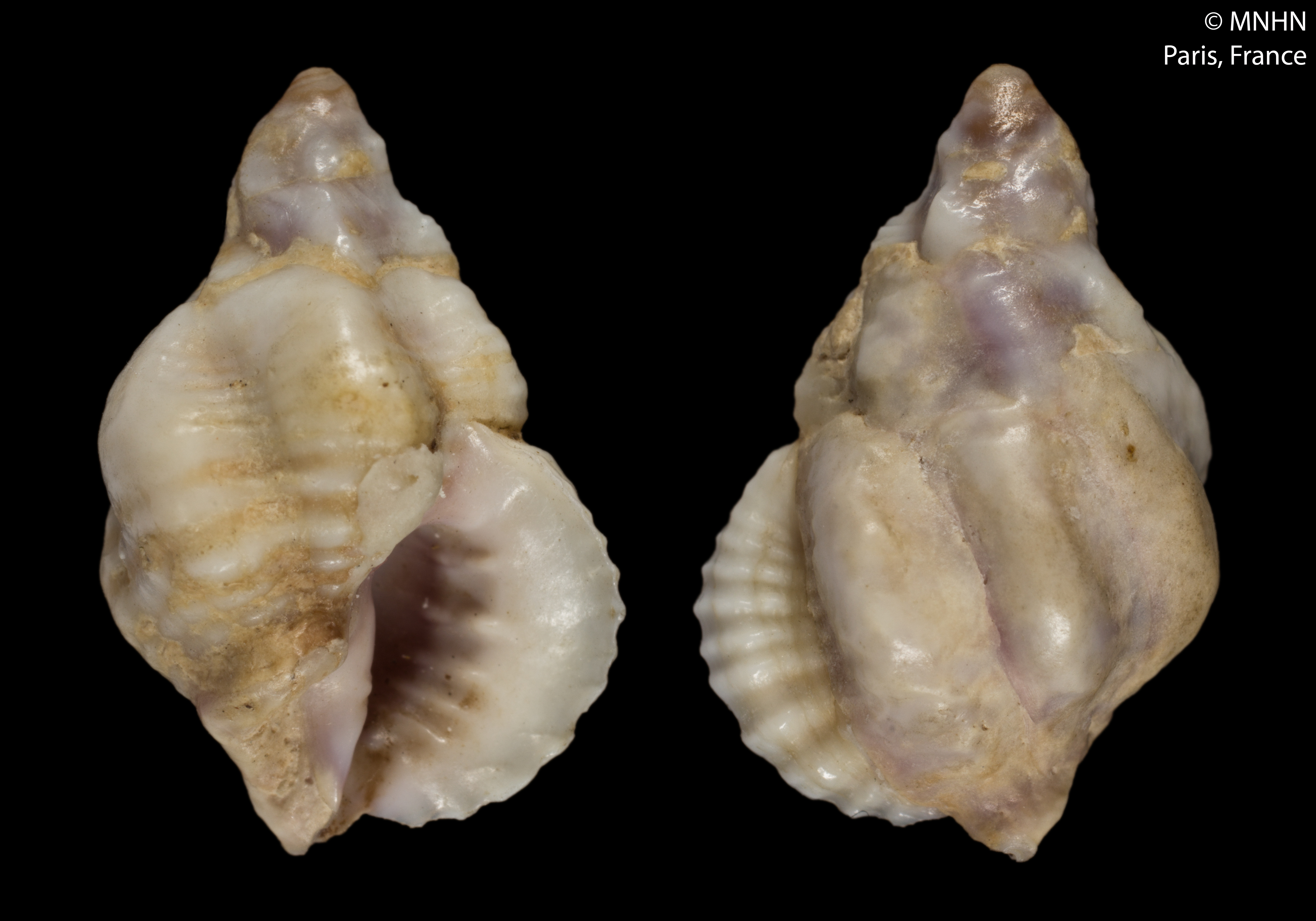
- Shell of Pascula ozenneana (syntype at MNHN, Paris)

Scientific classification
- Kingdom: Animalia
- Phylum: Mollusca
- Class: Gastropoda
- Subclass: Caenogastropoda
- Order: Neogastropoda
- Family: Muricidae
- Genus: Pascula
- Species: P. ozenneana

Binomial name
- Pascula ozenneana (Crosse 1861)

Synonyms
- Coralliophila dissimulans Preston, 1904; Cronia ozenneana (Crosse, 1861); Latirus gibbus Pease, 1865; Cronia ozenneana (Crosse, 1861); Murex crossei Lienard, 1873; Ricinula ozenneana Crosse, 1861

= Pascula ozenneana =

Species of gastropod

Pascula ozenneana is a species of sea snail, a marine gastropod mollusk in the family Muricidae, the murex snails or rock snails.

== Description ==
The length of the shell attains 14 mm.
