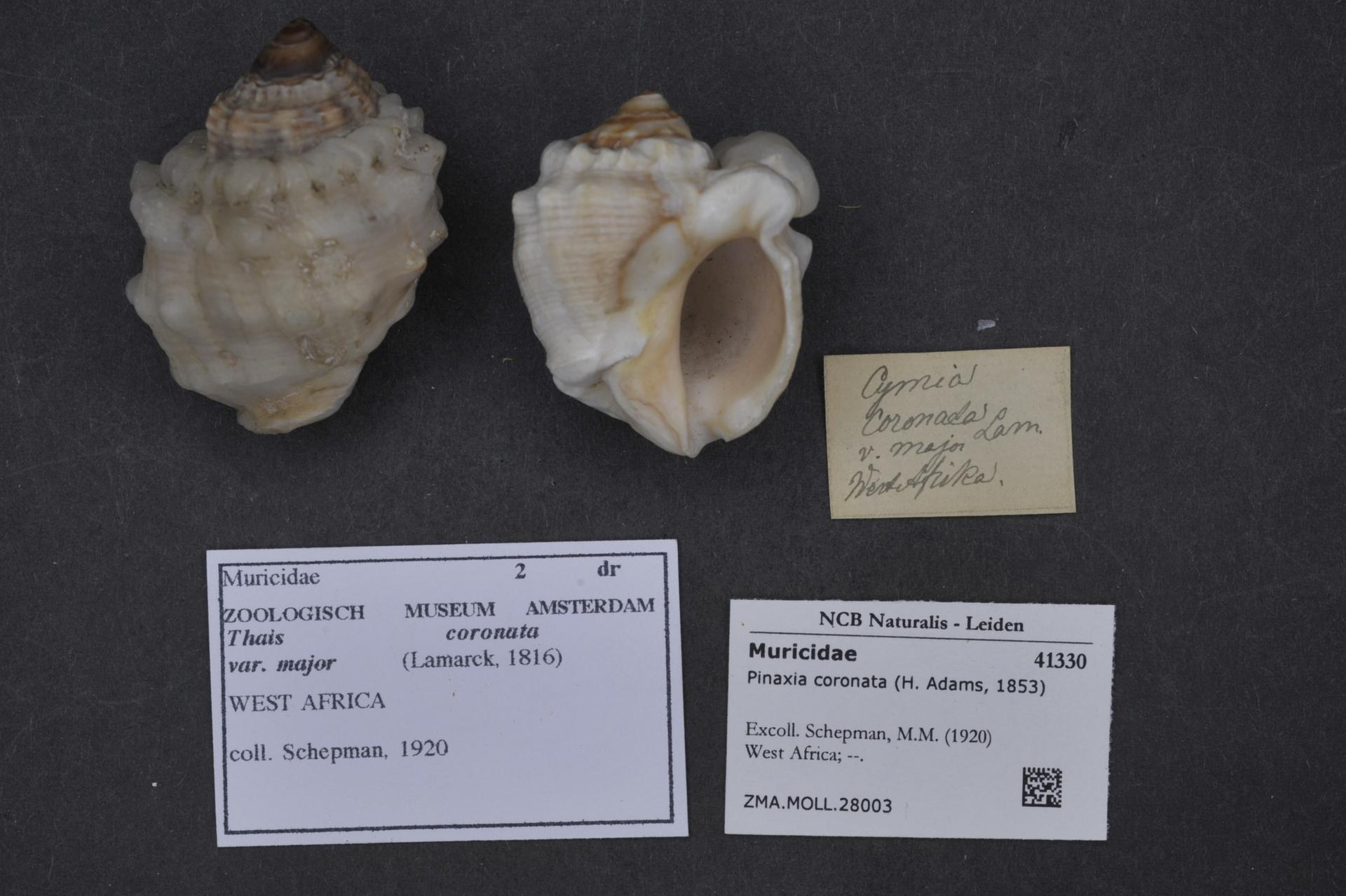

Scientific classification
- Kingdom: Animalia
- Phylum: Mollusca
- Class: Gastropoda
- Subclass: Caenogastropoda
- Order: Neogastropoda
- Family: Muricidae
- Genus: Pinaxia
- Species: P. coronata

Binomial name
- Pinaxia coronata (H. Adams, 1853)

Synonyms
- Conothais citrina Kuroda, 1930; Cronia coronata (H. Adams, 1869); Thais (Pinaxia) adamsi Dall, 1909

= Pinaxia coronata =

Species of gastropod

Pinaxia coronata is a species of sea snail, a marine gastropod mollusc in the family Muricidae, the murex snails or rock snails.
