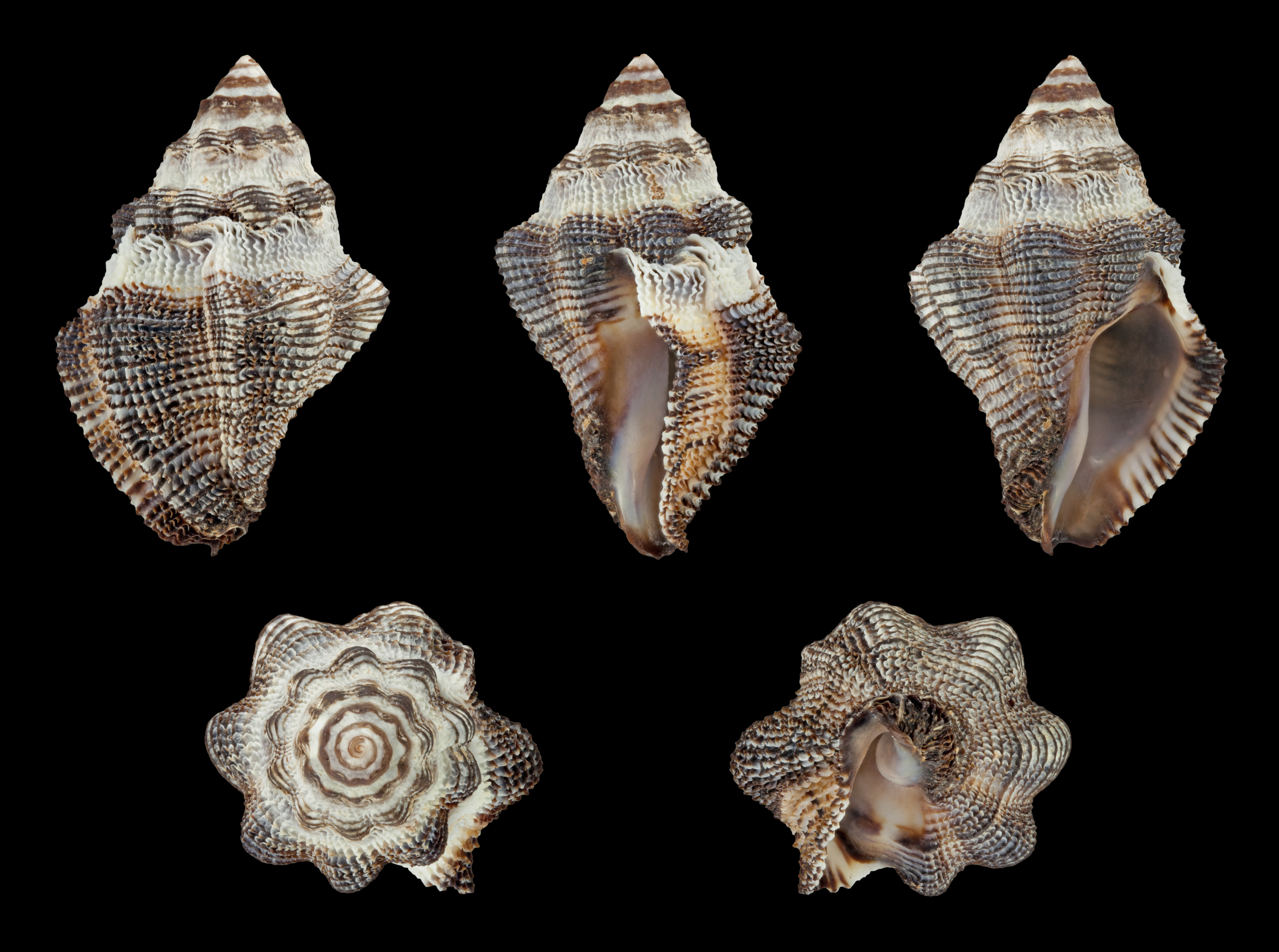
- Ergalatax crassulnata

Scientific classification
- Kingdom: Animalia
- Phylum: Mollusca
- Class: Gastropoda
- Subclass: Caenogastropoda
- Order: Neogastropoda
- Family: Muricidae
- Genus: Ergalatax
- Species: E. crassulnata

Binomial name
- Ergalatax crassulnata (Hedley, 1915)

Synonyms
- Cronia crassulnata (Hedley, 1915); Morula rhyssa Dall, 1923; Thais crassulnata Hedley, 1915

= Ergalatax crassulnata =

Species of gastropod

Ergalatax crassulnata, commonly known as the coarse cronia, is a species of sea snail, a marine gastropod mollusk in the family Muricidae, the murex snails or rock snails.

== Description ==
The shell size varies between 25 mm and 35 mm.

== Distribution ==
This species is distributed in the Gulf of Carpentaria, Australia.
