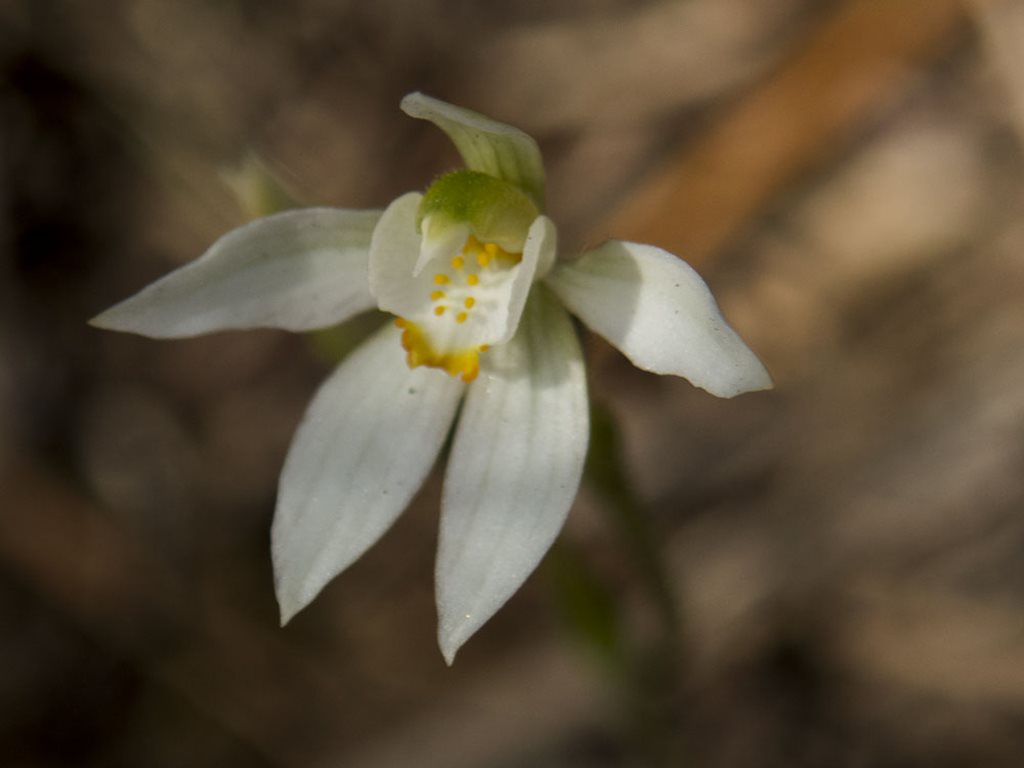
- Caladenia aurantiaca growing near Port Albert

Scientific classification
- Kingdom: Plantae
- Clade: Tracheophytes
- Clade: Angiosperms
- Clade: Monocots
- Order: Asparagales
- Family: Orchidaceae
- Subfamily: Orchidoideae
- Tribe: Diurideae
- Genus: Caladenia
- Species: C. aurantiaca

Binomial name
- Caladenia aurantiaca (R.S.Rogers) Rupp

Synonyms
- Caladenia carnea var. aurantiaca R.S.Rogers; Petalochilus aurantiacus (R.S.Rogers) D.L.Jones & M.A.Clem.

= Caladenia aurantiaca =

Orangetip fingers

Species of orchid

Caladenia aurantiaca, commonly known as orangetip fingers, is a plant in the orchid family Orchidaceae and is endemic to Victoria, although it is also found on one Bass Strait island. It is a slender ground orchid with a single hairy leaf and one or two short-lived, orange-tipped, white flowers on a thin, wiry spike.

== Description ==
Caladenia aurantiaca is a terrestrial, perennial, deciduous, herb with an underground tuber and a single hairy leaf, 3–10 cm (1–4 in) long and 1–2 mm (0.04–0.08 in) wide.

There are one or two white, orange-tipped flowers on a thin, wiry, sparsely hairy spike 5–22 cm (2–9 in) high, each flower 15–20 mm (0.6–0.8 in) wide. The dorsal sepal is erect in the lower part but curves forward, partly covering the column. It is oblong, 7–10 mm (0.3–0.4 in) long and 2 mm (0.08 in) wide. The lateral sepals are narrow lance-shaped, 7–10 mm (0.3–0.4 in) long, 2.5 mm (0.1 in) wide, turn downwards and are usually parallel to each other. The petals are about the same size as the sepals and spread widely or turn downwards. The labellum is egg-shaped, about 5 mm (0.2 in) long, 6 mm (0.2 in) wide with three lobes. The lateral lobes are erect, surround the column and have slightly wavy edges. The mid-lobe is triangular, curves downward with up to 3 pairs of short, orange calli along its edge. There are two rows of calli along the centre of the labellum. The column is pale green is broad with broad wings. Flowering occurs from August to November but the flowers are self-pollinating and are only open for up to four days.

== Taxonomy and naming ==
The species was first formally described by Richard Rogers in 1922 and given the name Caladenia carnea var. aurantica. The description was published in Transactions and Proceedings of the Royal Society of South Australia and the type specimen was collected near Alberton. In 1947, Herman Rupp raised it to species level and published the change in Proceedings of the Linnean Society of New South Wales. The specific epithet (aurantiaca) is a Neo-Latin word meaning "orange".

== Distribution and habitat ==
Caladenia aurantiaca grows in near-coastal areas east of Melbourne in moist heath on sandy soils. It has also been seen on Deal Island in Bass Strait.

== Conservation ==
This species is classified as "rare" in Victoria and as Endangered under the Tasmanian "Threatened Species Protection Act 1995".
