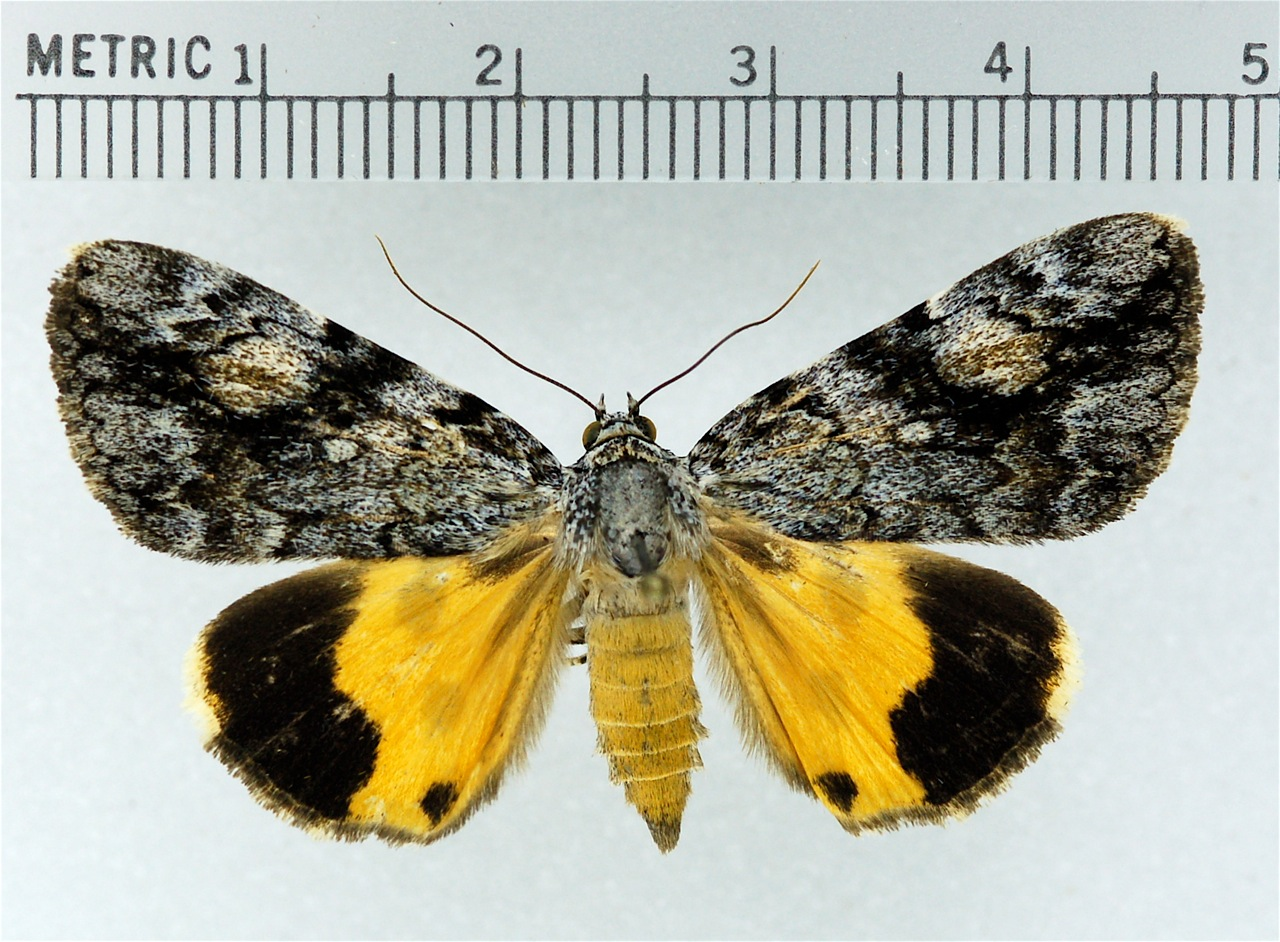
- Imago from above (scale in centimeters)
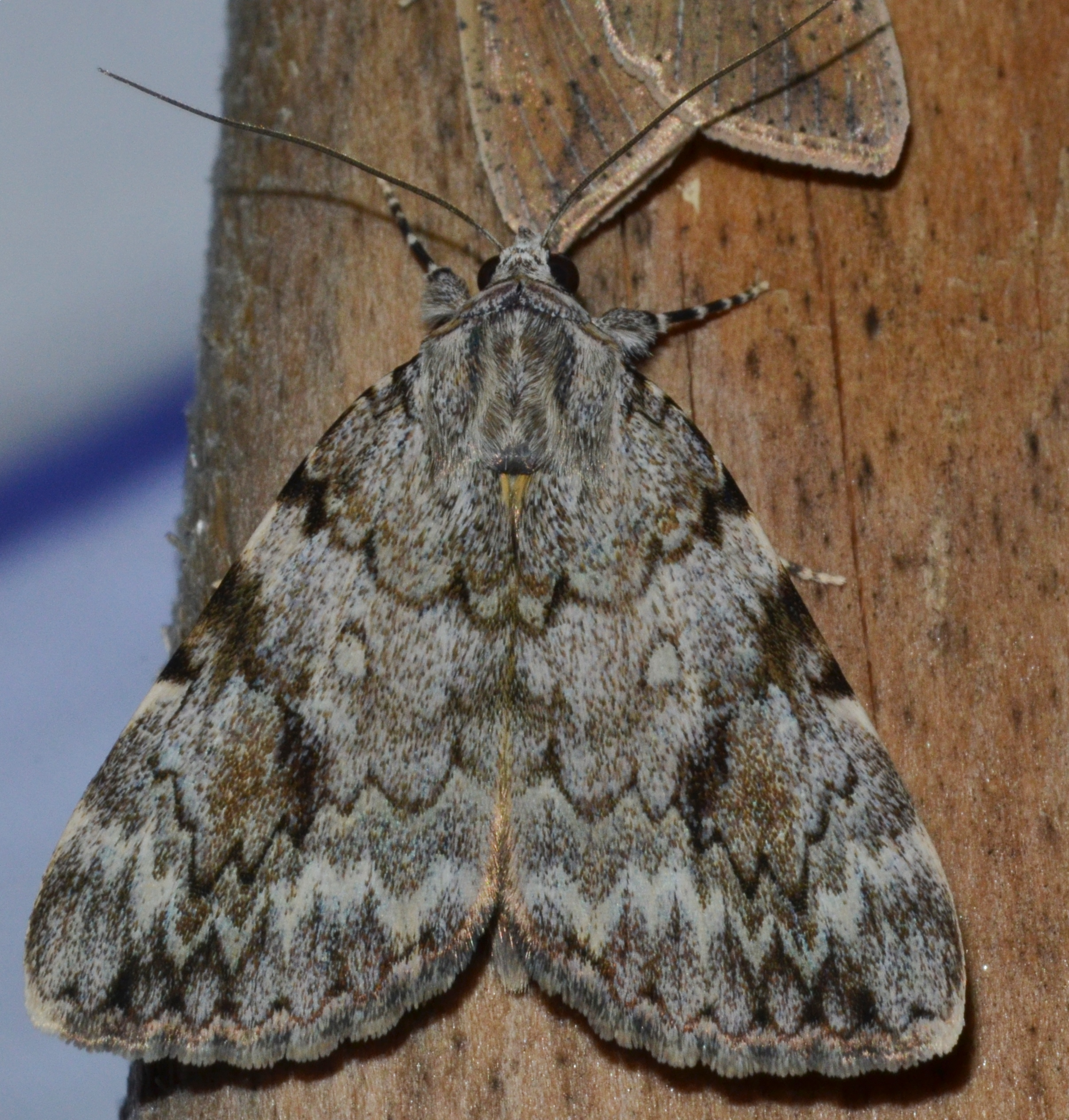

Scientific classification
- Kingdom: Animalia
- Phylum: Arthropoda
- Clade: Pancrustacea
- Class: Insecta
- Order: Lepidoptera
- Superfamily: Noctuoidea
- Family: Erebidae
- Genus: Catocala
- Species: C. amica

Binomial name
- Catocala amica (Hübner, 1818)

Synonyms
- Catocala amica var. nerissa H.Edwards, 1880; Catocala androphila Guenée in Boisduval & Guenée, 1852; Catocala aurantiaca Reiff, 1916; Catocala suffusa Beutenmüller, 1903; Ephesia amica Hübner, 1818; Catocala novangliae Reiff, 1916

= Catocala amica =

Girlfriend underwing

Species of moth

Catocala amica, the girlfriend underwing, is a moth of the family Erebidae. The species was first described by Jacob Hübner in 1818. It is found from southern Canada (Ontario and Quebec) through the United States east of the Rocky Mountains, ranging westward to Oklahoma and Arizona, northward to Minnesota and southwestward to Texas.

== Description and ecology ==
The wingspan of adults is 35–40 mm. They are generally easy to recognize by the cryptically patterned forewings, the yellow background color of their hindwings, and the black pattern on the latter. This consists of a black band along the outer edge, save for the hindmost part where a separate black dot is found. Forewing hue varies a lot, but similar sympatric species usually have an additional black band running across the central hindwings. Unlike in many (but not all) other underwing moths, their tibiae are all spineless.

Adults are on the wing from June to September depending on the location; they are often attracted to UV light at night. The caterpillars feed on oak (Quercus) species, including.

Of section Quercus

- Bur oak (Q. macrocarpa)
- Chestnut oak (Q. prinus)
- Dwarf chinkapin oak (Q. prinoides)
- Post oak (Q. stellata)
- Swamp white oak (Q. bicolor)
- White oak (Q. alba)

Of section Lobatae

- Bear oak (Q. ilicifolia)
- Eastern black oak (Q. velutina)
- Northern red oak (Q. rubra)
- Scarlet oak (Q. coccinea)

== Classification ==
This moth is placed in the subfamily Catocalinae, either of the owlet moth family, Noctuidae, or – if the Noctuidae are circumscribed more strictly – of family Erebidae. Within the Catocalinae, it belongs to tribe Catocalini and – if the Noctuidae are circumscribed widely – subtribe Catocalina.

The former subspecies C. a. lineella, which occurs to the north and east of the girlfriend underwing, is now again considered to be a valid species Catocala lineella (little lined underwing or steely underwing).

C. amica is the type species of Corisce, initially proposed to be a distinct genus. Given that phylogeny and monophyly of Catocala in its present circumscription are unresolved, and that the girlfriend underwing and its closest relatives look quite different from their supposed congeners, Corisce might ultimately be revalidated. However, C. amica closely resembles other more usually-colored Catocala in possessing no spines at all on the tibiae.
