= Coenyra aurantiaca =

Scientific classification
- Domain: Eukaryota
- Kingdom: Animalia
- Phylum: Arthropoda
- Class: Insecta
- Order: Lepidoptera
- Family: Nymphalidae
- Genus: Coenyra
- Species: C. aurantiaca

Binomial name
- Coenyra aurantiaca Riley, 1938

Synonyms
- Coenyra hebe ab. aurantiaca Aurivillius, 1911

Species of butterfly

Coenyra aurantiaca, the Pondo shadefly, is a butterfly of the family Nymphalidae. It is found in South Africa, in the Eastern Cape from Alexandria to Wild Coast north to Umdoni Park in southern KwaZulu-Natal. Inland it is found to the Afromontane forests in the Amatolas and on the Katberg.

The wingspan is 35–38 mm for males and 36–40 mm for females. Adults are on wing from October to May (with a peak in late summer).

The larvae probably feed on Poaceae species. Larvae have been reared on Ehrharta erecta.
