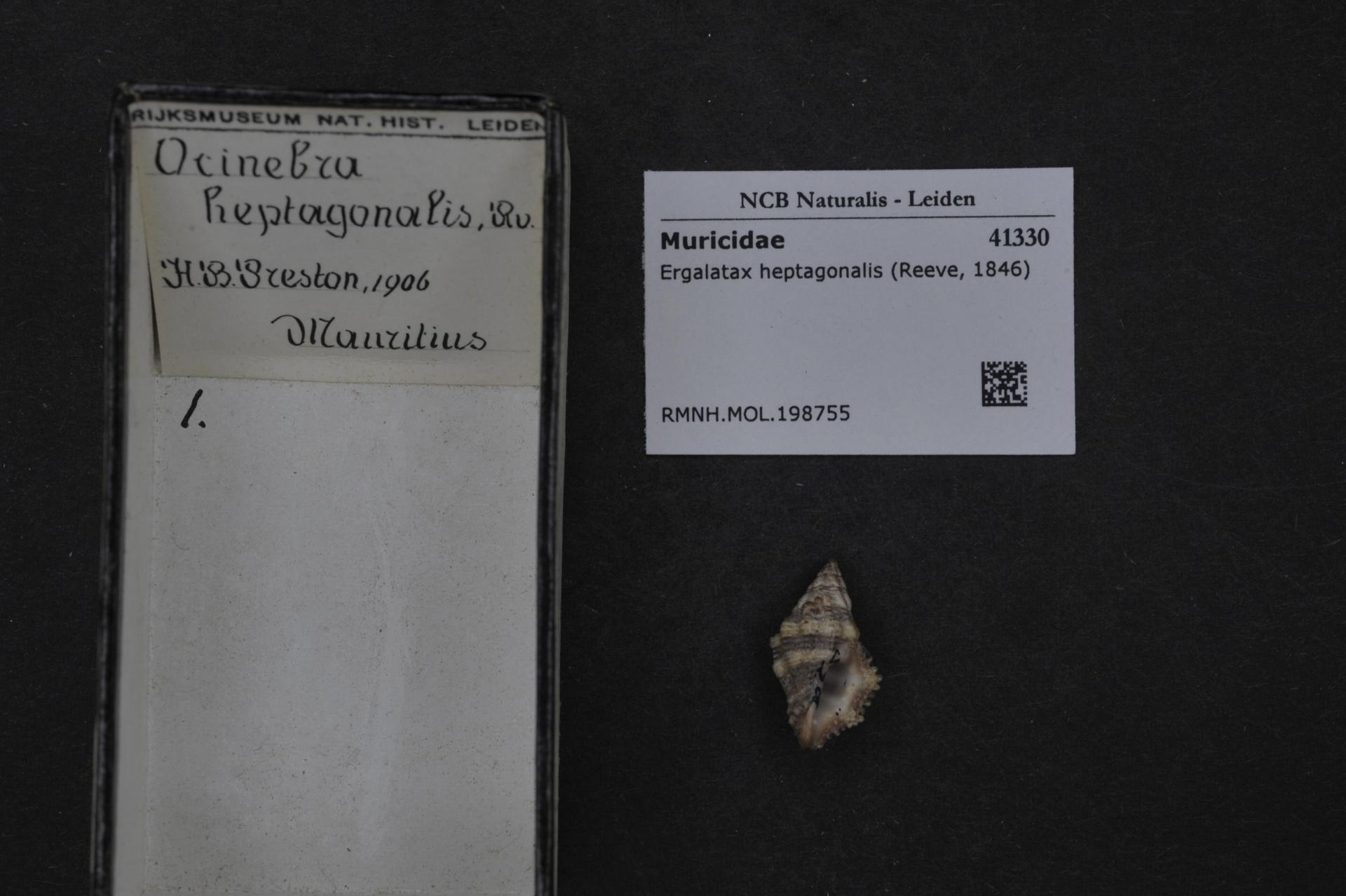

Scientific classification
- Kingdom: Animalia
- Phylum: Mollusca
- Class: Gastropoda
- Subclass: Caenogastropoda
- Order: Neogastropoda
- Family: Muricidae
- Genus: Ergalatax
- Species: E. heptagonalis

Binomial name
- Ergalatax heptagonalis (Reeve, 1846)

Synonyms
- Cronia heptagonalis (Reeve, 1846); Drupa ochrostoma heptagonalis (Reeve, 1846); Ricinula heptagonalis Reeve, 1846; Ricinula ochrostoma heptagonalis (Reeve, 1846); Urosalpinx heptagonalis (Reeve, 1846)

= Ergalatax heptagonalis =

Species of gastropod

Ergalatax heptagonalis is a species of sea snail, a marine gastropod mollusc in the family Muricidae, the murex snails or rock snails.
