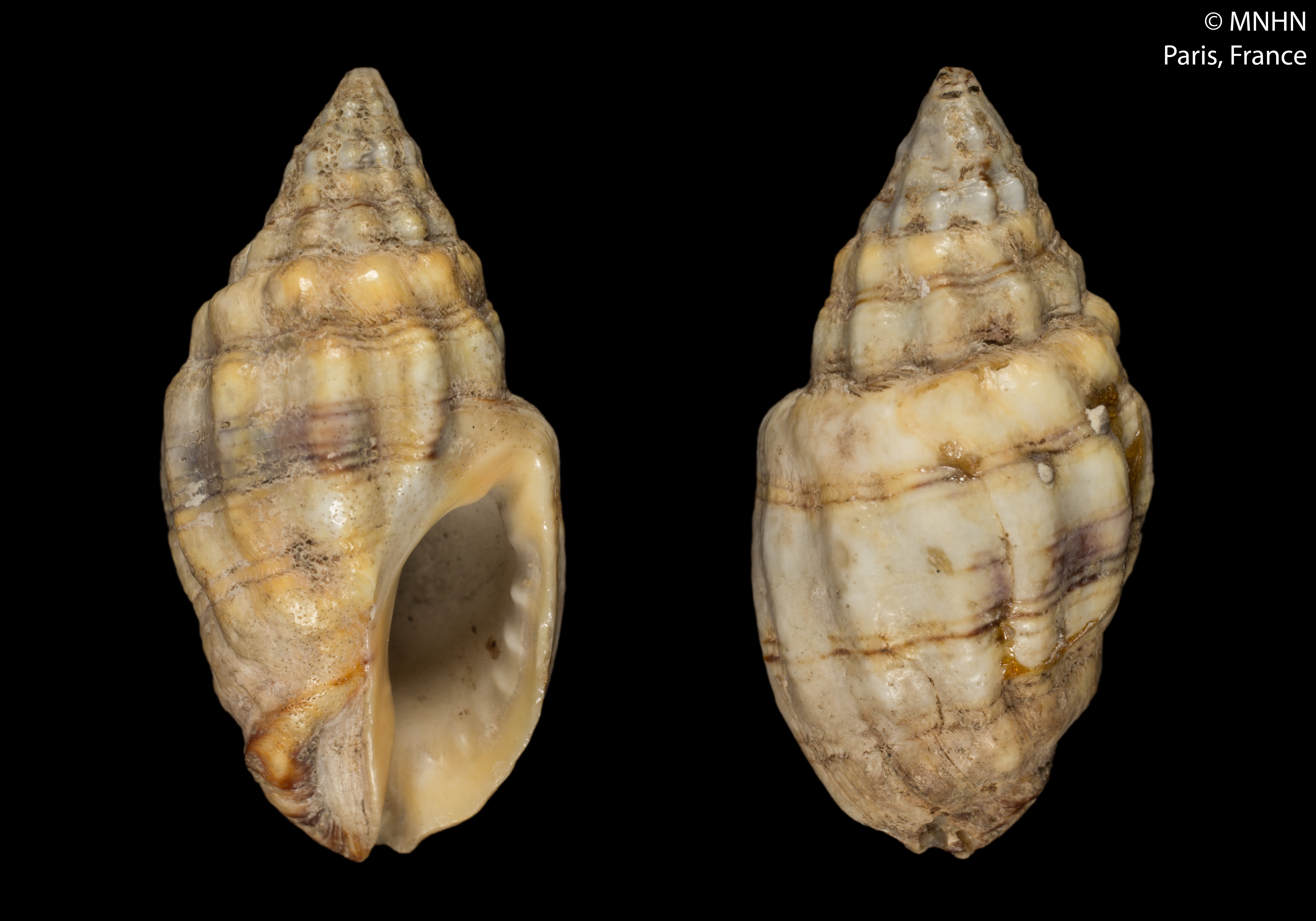
- Shell of Cronia aurantiaca (holotype at MNHN, Paris)

Scientific classification
- Kingdom: Animalia
- Phylum: Mollusca
- Class: Gastropoda
- Subclass: Caenogastropoda
- Order: Neogastropoda
- Family: Muricidae
- Genus: Cronia
- Species: C. aurantiaca

Binomial name
- Cronia aurantiaca (Hombron & Jacquinot, 1853)

Synonyms
- Cronia (Cronia) aurantiaca (Hombron & Jacquinot, 1848); Cronia pseudamygdala (Hedley, 1903); Purpura aurantiaca Hombron & Jacquinot, 1853; Purpura pseudamygdala Hedley, 1903

= Cronia aurantiaca =

Species of gastropod

Cronia aurantiaca is a species of sea snail, a marine gastropod mollusk in the family Muricidae, the murex snails or rock snails.

== Distribution ==
This species occurs in the Southern Pacific Ocean off Australia.
