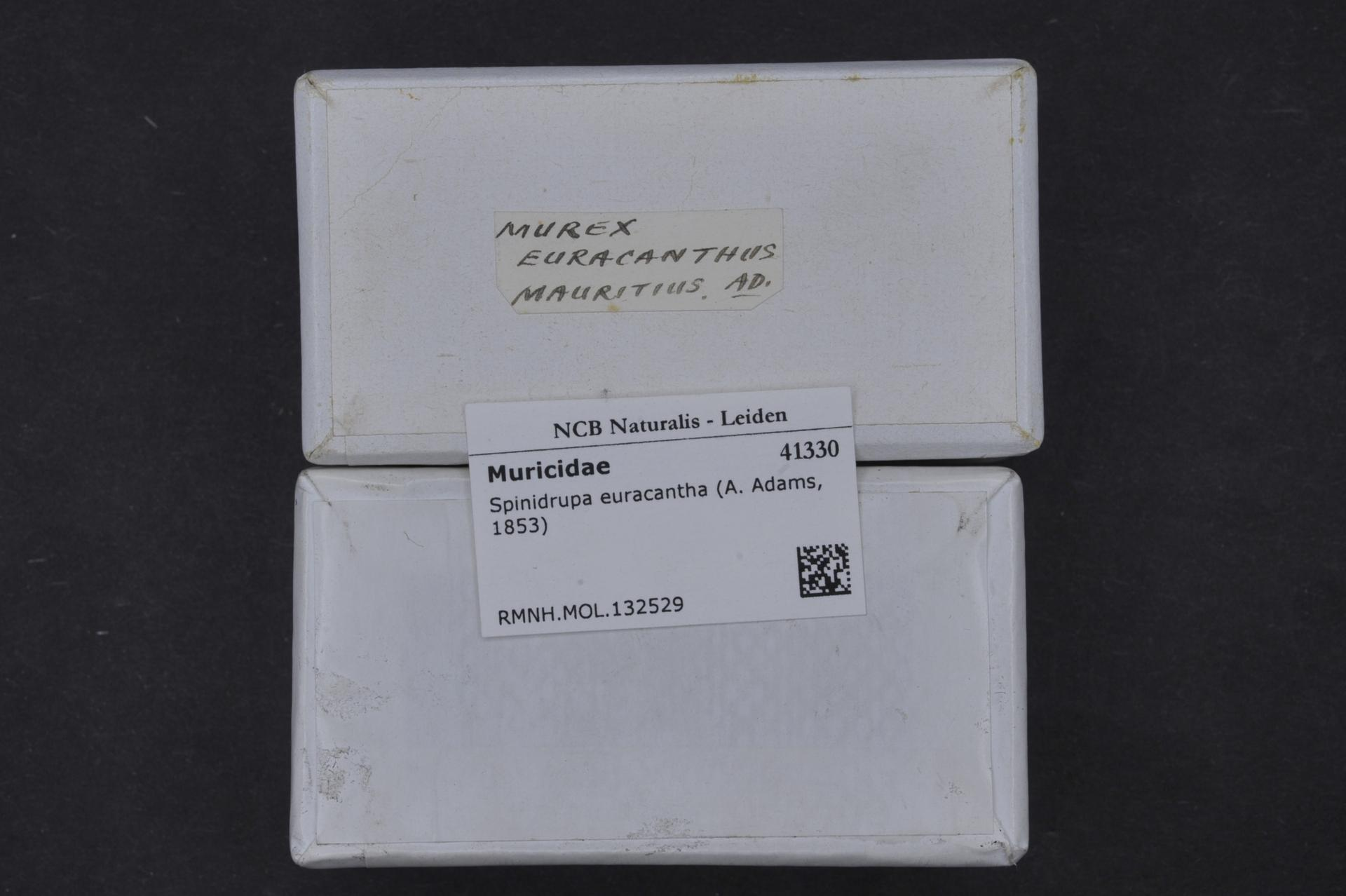
- Spinidrupa euracantha

Scientific classification
- Kingdom: Animalia
- Phylum: Mollusca
- Class: Gastropoda
- Subclass: Caenogastropoda
- Order: Neogastropoda
- Family: Muricidae
- Genus: Spinidrupa
- Species: S. euracantha

Binomial name
- Spinidrupa euracantha (A. Adams, 1853)

Synonyms
- Murex euracantha A. Adams, 1853; Murex iostoma A. Adams, 1853

= Spinidrupa euracantha =

Species of gastropod

Spinidrupa euracantha is a species of sea snail, a marine gastropod mollusc in the family Muricidae, the murex snails or rock snails.
