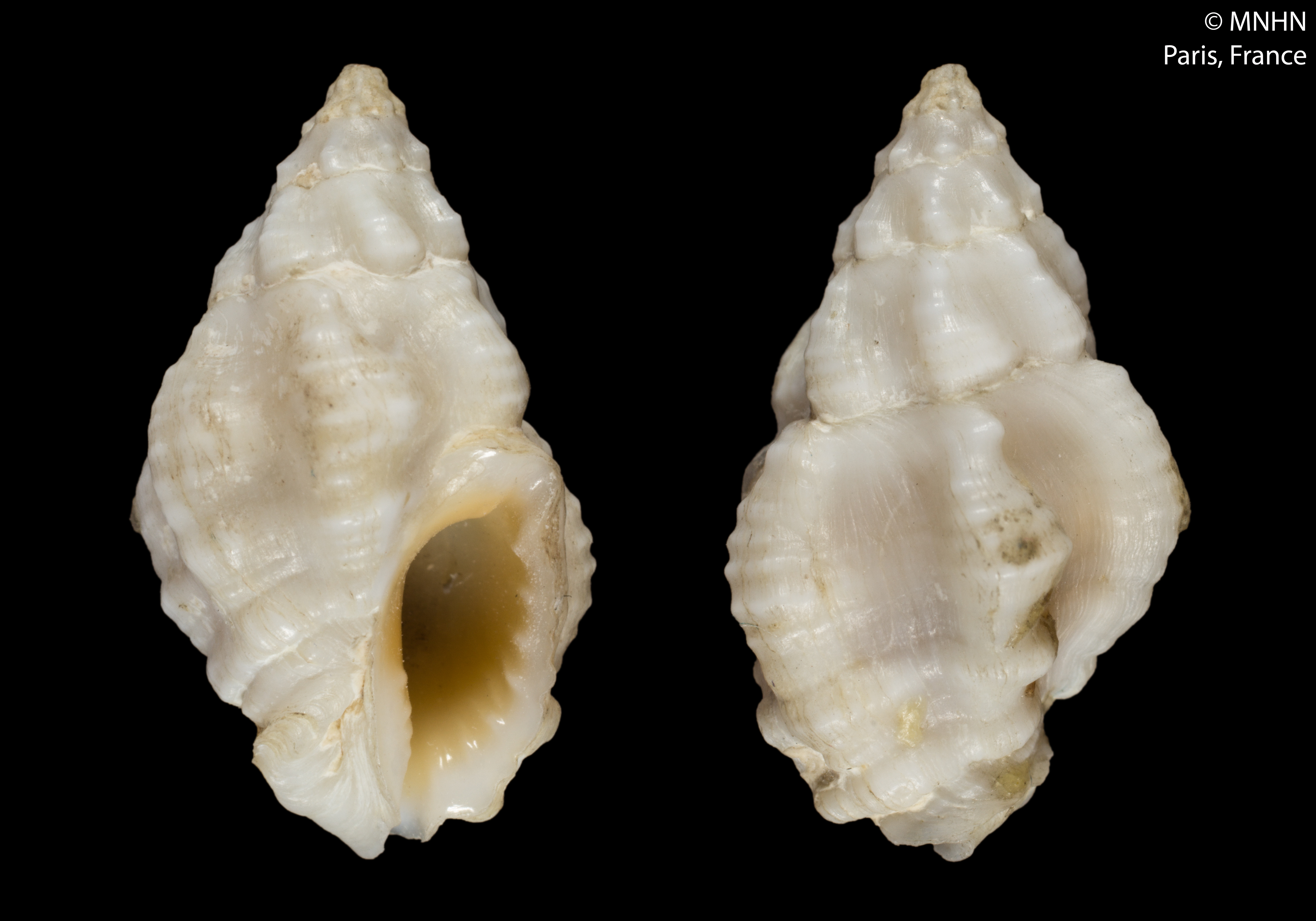

Scientific classification
- Kingdom: Animalia
- Phylum: Mollusca
- Class: Gastropoda
- Subclass: Caenogastropoda
- Order: Neogastropoda
- Family: Muricidae
- Genus: Pascula
- Species: P. ochrostoma

Binomial name
- Pascula ochrostoma (Blaidnville, 1832)

Synonyms
- Clathurella cavernosa Reeve, L.A., 1846; Cronia ochrostoma (Blainville, 1832); Drupa ochrostoma (Blainville, 1832); Drupella ochrostoma (Blainville, 1832); Mancinella mancinella; Purpura ochrostoma de Blainville, 1832 (basionym); Ricinula cavernosa Reeve, 1846; Ricinula ochrostoma (Blainville, 1832)

= Pascula ochrostoma =

Species of gastropod

Pascula ochrostoma is a species of sea snail, a marine gastropod mollusk in the family Muricidae, the murex snails or rock snails.

== Description ==
The shell size varies between 11 and 35 mm (0.43 and 1.38 in).

== Distribution ==
This species is distributed in the Red Sea and in the Indian Ocean along Aldabra, Chagos, Madagascar, the Mascarene Basin, the Seychelles, and Tanzania. It is also known from the Western Pacific Ocean, the Philippines, and North and Western Australia.
