= Ergalatax junionae =

Scientific classification
- Kingdom: Animalia
- Phylum: Mollusca
- Class: Gastropoda
- Subclass: Caenogastropoda
- Order: Neogastropoda
- Family: Muricidae
- Genus: Ergalatax
- Species: E. junionae

Binomial name
- Ergalatax junionae Houart, 2008

Synonyms
- Morula martensi Dall, 1923; Morula siderea Martens, 1874

Species of gastropod

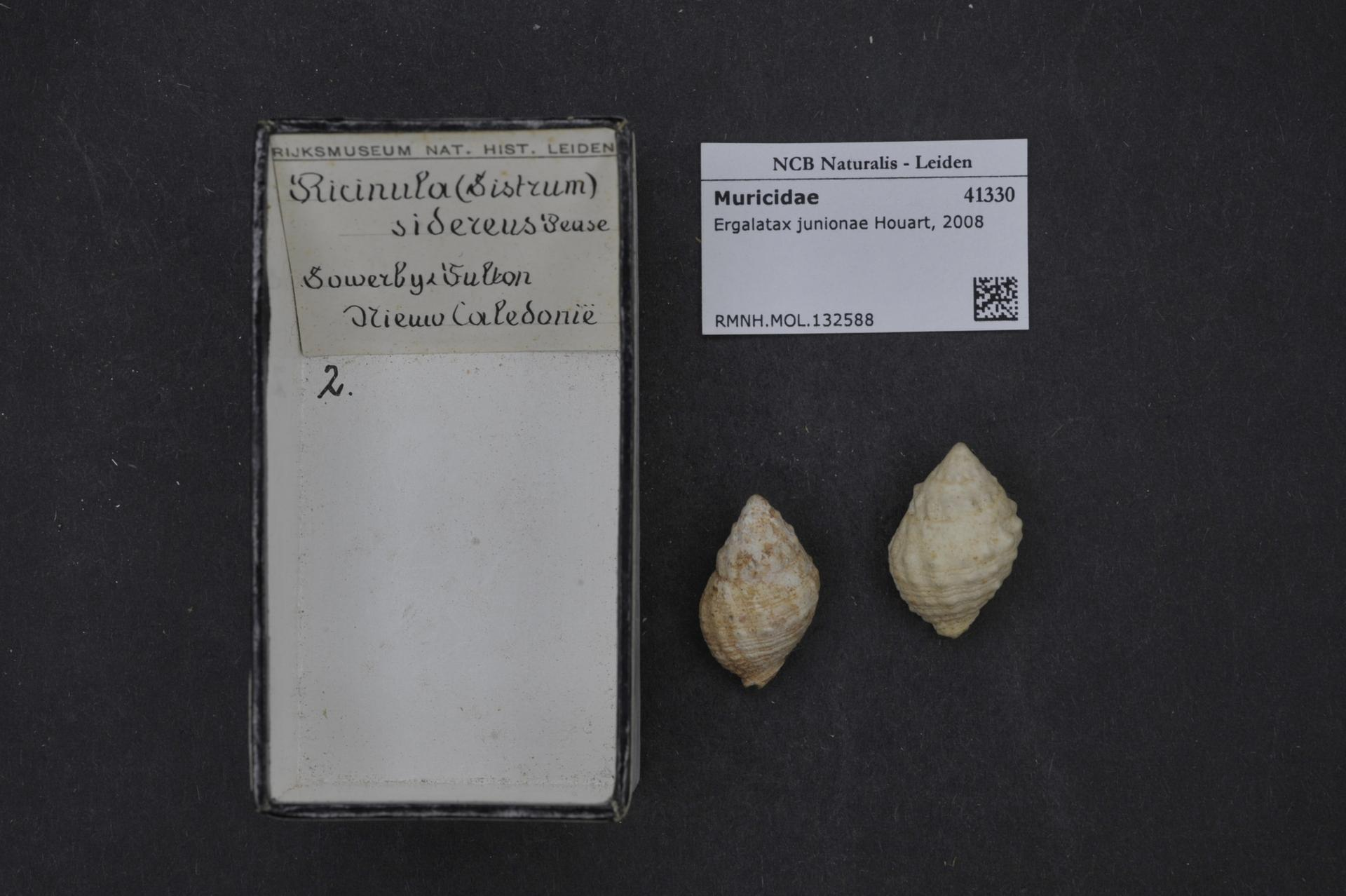
Ergalatax junionae Houart, 2008.

Ergalatax junionae is a species of sea snail, a marine gastropod mollusc in the family Muricidae, the murex snails or rock snails.

== Distribution ==
Persian Gulf and Gulf of Oman.
