= Edward Whitaker Gray =

18th-century English botanist and doctor

- Born: 21 March 1748; London
- Died: 27 December 1806 (aged 58); British Museum, London

Academic work
- School or tradition: Royal College of Physicians
- Main interests: Various, Natural Historian
- Notable works: Keeper: National Collection
- Influenced: José Correia da Serra, William Marsden

Edward Whitaker Gray (21 March 1748 – 27 December 1806), English botanist and secretary to the Royal Society, was uncle of Samuel Frederick Gray, author of The Practical Chemist.

== Educational and professional roles ==
While attending the College of Physicians Gray performed the duties of librarian. He became a licentiate in 1773. He graduated M.D., and ultimately was assigned as keeper of the departments of Natural history and antiquities in the British Museum, which consisted of the collection purchased from Sir Hans Sloane on his death in 1753. This role he held from 1778 until his death. During his tenure, he reorganized the natural history collections employing the Linnæan system. George Shaw assumed his duties as keeper in 1807 having assisted since 1791.

Within zoology, Gray's Catalogue of Shells for the British Museum (1791) best reflect his work as a malacologist.

Gray introduced two plants, Hexandria monogynia, native to Brazil, and Hexandria monogynia, native to Portugal, shipped from Oporto, and catalogued (1777) in the Royal Botanical gardens at Kew. He was one of the original associates of the Linnean Society in 1788.

In 1785 and 1786, Gray delivered Croonian Lectures on topics related to muscle response, and in 1789 he contributed Observations on the … Amphibia to the Philosophical Transactions of the Royal Society, of which he was a fellow (elected Feb. 1779), and of which on St. Andrew's day in 1797 he became the junior secretary. His 1807 successor to this secretarial post was Sir Humphry Davy, future mentor to Michael Faraday.

Gray died at the British Museum, 27 December 1806, in his fifty-ninth year of age.

=== Family ===
Gray married Elizabeth Bearsley on 6 June 1775 in Oporto, Portugal. By her he had three children. His two daughters, Juliana and Elizabeth, were both christened in Portugal. The younger daughter married in 1808 Taylor Combe, who subsequently assumed the junior secretarial role for the Royal Society. His son, Francis Edward Gray died on 3 January 1814 at Oporto, 29 years of age.

=== Articles published in Philosophical Transactions ===
- "Observations on the manner in which glass is charged and discharged with the electric fluid". – LXXVIII. 121
- "Observations on the class of animals called by Linnæus amphibia; particularly on the means of distinguishing those serpents which are venomous from those which are not so." – LXXIX. 21
- "Account of an earthquake felt in various parts of England, 18 November 1795, with some observations thereon." – LXXXVI. 353

=== Catalogues ===
- Catalogue of plants found in the neighbourhood of Newbury (published by Hall & Marsh 1839).
- Catalogue of shells bequeathed to the British Museum by the Rev. Clayton Mordaunt Cracherode, A.M. (published 1801).

== Notes ==
=== References ===
- "Gray, Edward Whitaker" . Dictionary of National Biography. London: Smith, Elder & Co. 1885–1900.
