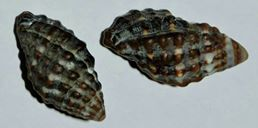

Scientific classification
- Kingdom: Animalia
- Phylum: Mollusca
- Class: Gastropoda
- Subclass: Caenogastropoda
- Order: Neogastropoda
- Family: Muricidae
- Genus: Claremontiella
- Species: C. nodulosa

Binomial name
- Claremontiella nodulosa (Adams, 1845)

Synonyms
- Drupa nodulosa (C. B. Adams, 1845); Evokesia ferruginosa (Reeve, 1846); Morula (Morula) nodulosa (C. B. Adams, 1845); Morula ferruginosa (Reeve, 1846); Morula nodulosa (C. B. Adams, 1845); Pascula ferruginosa (Reeve, 1846); Purpura nodulosa Adamss, 1845 (basionym); Ricinula ferruginosa Reeve, 1846; Trachypollia nodulosa (Adams, 1845)

= Claremontiella nodulosa =

Species of gastropod

Claremontiella nodulosa, common name: the blackberry drupe, is a species of sea snail, a marine gastropod mollusk in the family Muricidae, the murex snails or rock snails.

== Description ==
This shell commonly called Blackberry drupe is commonly found in rocky areas along South-east of Florida coast and the Florida keys. The size of an adult shell varies between 13 mm and 25 mm. Its body is encrusted and the proloconch eroded.An adult blackberry drupe can be distinguished from others by:

1. It's thick lips coupled with about 4-5 large beads on the inside of the lips.

2. Its purple coloured aperture.

3. Grossly studded telechonch and body whorl with round black beeds.

== Distribution ==
This species is distributed in the Caribbean Sea, the Gulf of Mexico, the Lesser Antilles, the Atlantic Ocean along Brazil, Cape Verde, Angola and Gabon.
