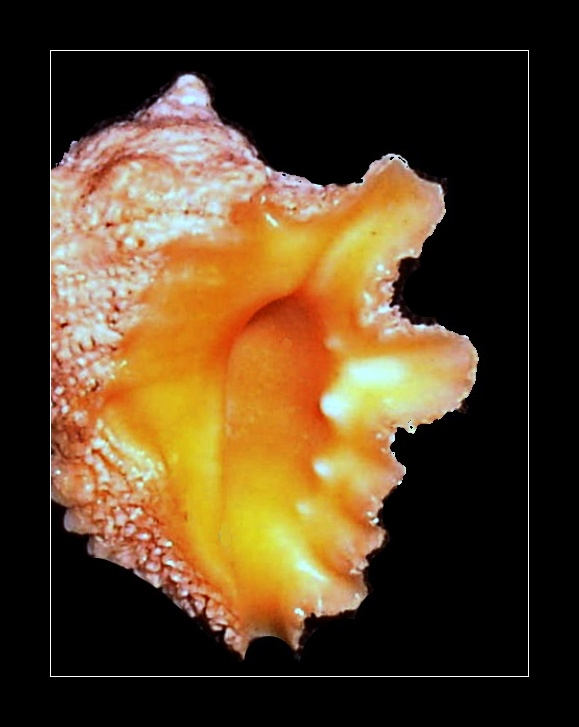
- a shell of Drupa grossularia

Scientific classification
- Kingdom: Animalia
- Phylum: Mollusca
- Class: Gastropoda
- Subclass: Caenogastropoda
- Order: Neogastropoda
- Family: Muricidae
- Subfamily: Rapaninae
- Genus: Drupa; Röding, 1798

Synonyms
- Canrena Link, 1807; Drupa (Drupa) Röding, 1798; Drupa (Ricinella) Schumacher, 1817; Pentadactylus Mörch, 1852; Pentadactylus (Sistrum) Montfort, 1810; Purpura (Ricinula) Lamarck, 1816; † Purpura (Sistrum) Monfort, 1810; Ricinula Montfort, 1810; Ricinula (Sistrum) Montfort, 1810; Sistrum Montfort, 1810; Sistrum (Ricinula) Montfort, 1810

= Drupa (gastropod) =

Genus of gastropods

Drupa is a genus of sea snails, marine gastropod mollusks in the family Muricidae, the murex snails or rock snails. It occurs in the Indo-Pacific.

== Description ==
In this genus, the shell has a narrow aperture occluded by columellar and outer lip teeth.

(Described as Pentadactylus) The solid shell is ovate. The spire is short. The whorls are tubercular or spinous. The aperture is linear, narrow, contracted by callous projections, with an oblique emarginate Siphonal canal in front. The inner lip is wrinkled. The outer lip is internally with plait-like teeth, often digitate.

== Diet ==
Drupa snails are predators that mainly feed on polychaetes but also on vermetids, sipunculids, crustaceans and fish.

== Species ==
Species within the genus Drupa include:

- Drupa albolabris (Blainville, 1832)
- Drupa aperta (Blainville, 1832)
- Drupa clathrata (Lamarck, 1816)
- Drupa denticulata Houart & Vilvens, 1997
- Drupa elegans (Broderip & Sowerby, 1829)
- Drupa morum Röding, 1798
- † Drupa puruensis (K. Martin, 1914)
- † Drupa rhombiformis (K. Martin, 1899)
- Drupa ricinus (Linnaeus, 1758)
- Drupa rubusidaeus Röding, 1798
- Drupa speciosa (Dunker, 1867)
- † Drupa turrita (K. Martin, 1879)

Species brought into synonymy

- Drupa anaxeres Duclos in Kiener, 1836: synonym of Morula (Morula) anaxares (Kiener, 1835)
- Drupa andrewsi (E. A. Smith, 1909): synonym of Morula japonica (G. B. Sowerby III, 1903)
- Drupa aspera Lamarck: synonym of Morula (Morula) aspera (Lamarck, 1816)
- Drupa biconica de Blainville: synonym of Morula (Habromorula) biconica (Blainville, 1832)
- Drupa cancellata Quoy & Gaimard: synonym of Muricodrupa fenestrata (Blainville, 1832)
- Drupa chrysostoma Deshayes: synonym of Semiricinula chrysostoma (Deshayes, 1844)
- Drupa concatenata Lamarck: synonym of Drupella rugosa (Born, 1778)
- Drupa decussata Reeve: synonym of Muricodrupa fiscella (Gmelin, 1791)
- Drupa digitata Lamarck: synonym of Drupa (Drupina) grossularia Röding, 1798
- Drupa elata Blainville: synonym of Drupella cornus (Röding, 1798)
- Drupa fiscella (Chemnitz, 1788): synonym of Muricodrupa fiscella (Gmelin, 1791)
- Drupa fusconigra Dunker: synonym of Semiricinula squamosa (Pease, 1868)
- Drupa granulata (Duclos, 1832): synonym of Morula (Morula) granulata (Duclos, 1832)
- Drupa horrida Lamarck: synonym of Drupa (Drupa) morum morum Röding, 1798
- Drupa margariticola Broderip: synonym of Ergalatax margariticola (Broderip, in Broderip & Sowerby, 1833)
- Drupa marginatra (Blainville): synonym of Semiricinula marginatra (Blainville, 1832)
- Drupa miticula Lamarck, 1822: synonym of Drupa clathrata miticula (Lamarck, 1822)
- Drupa mutica Lamarck: synonym of Morula (Azumamorula) mutica (Lamarck, 1816)
- Drupa ochrostoma (de Blainville, 1832): synonym of Pascula ochrostoma (Blainville, 1832)
- Drupa reticulata: synonym of Phycothais reticulata (Quoy & Gaimard, 1833)
- Drupa spathulifera Blainville: synonym of Drupa (Ricinella) rubusidaeus Röding, 1798
- Drupa spectrum Reeve: synonym of Drupella cornus (Röding, 1798)
- Drupa spinosa Adams, 1853: synonym of Morula (Habromorula) spinosa (H. Adams & A. Adams, 1853)
- Drupa tuberculata (de Blainville, 1832): synonym of Morula (Morula) granulata (Duclos, 1832)
- Drupa undata (Chemnitz, 1795): synonym of Ergalatax margariticola (Broderip, in Broderip & Sowerby, 1833)
- Drupa violacea Schumacher: synonym of Drupa (Drupa) morum morum Röding, 1798
