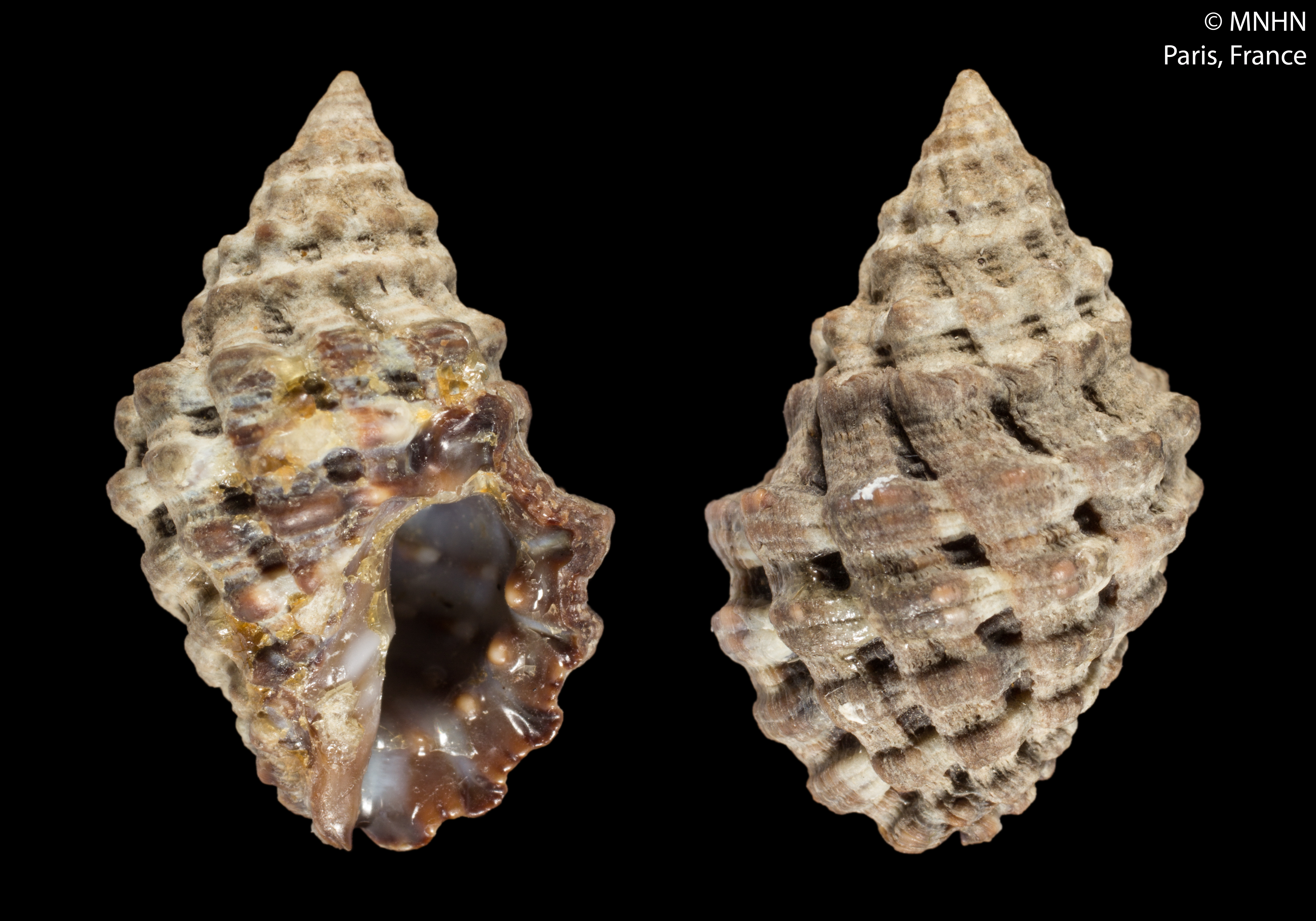
- Shell of Neothais marginatra (syntype at MNHN, Paris)

Scientific classification
- Kingdom: Animalia
- Phylum: Mollusca
- Class: Gastropoda
- Subclass: Caenogastropoda
- Order: Neogastropoda
- Superfamily: Muricoidea
- Family: Muricidae
- Subfamily: Rapaninae
- Genus: Neothais; Iredale, 1912

Type species
- Purpura smithi Brazier, 1889

Species
- See text

= Neothais =

Genus of gastropods

Neothais is a genus of sea snails, marine gastropod mollusks in the subfamily Rapaninae of the family Muricidae, the murex snails or rock snails.

== Species ==
Species within the genus Neothais include:

- Neothais harpa (Conrad, 1837)
- † Neothais lassa Marwick, 1948
- Neothais marginatra (Blainville, 1832)
- Neothais nesiotes (Dall, 1908)
- Neothais smithi (Brazier, 1889)

Species brought into synonymy

- Neothais clathrata (A. Adams, 1854): synonym of Coralliophila clathrata (A. Adams, 1854)
- Neothais scalaris (Menke, 1829): synonym of Dicathais orbita (Gmelin, 1791)
