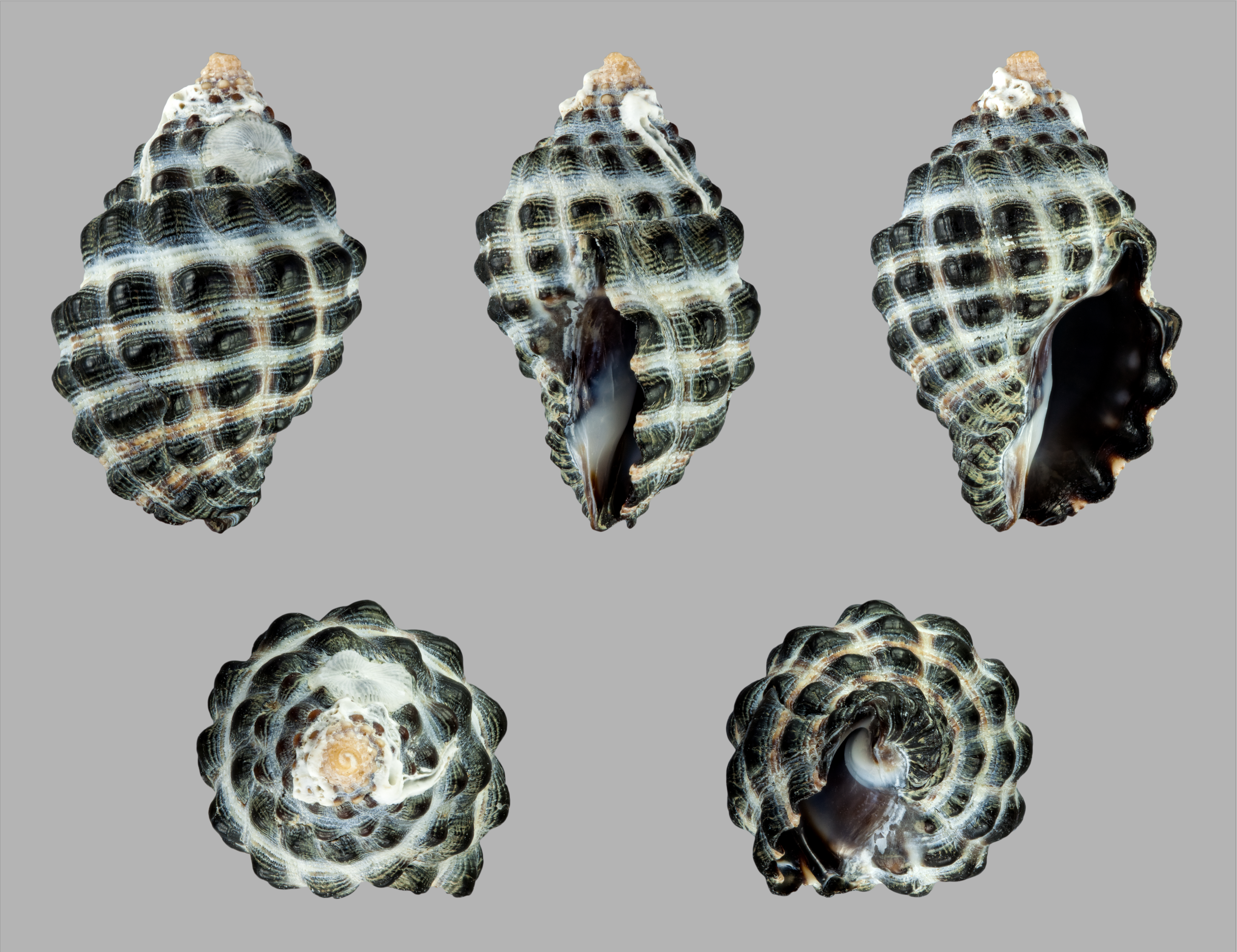
- A shell of the type species, Tenguella granulata.

Scientific classification
- Kingdom: Animalia
- Phylum: Mollusca
- Class: Gastropoda
- Subclass: Caenogastropoda
- Order: Neogastropoda
- Family: Muricidae
- Subfamily: Ergalataxinae
- Genus: Tenguella; Arakawa, 1965

Type species
- Purpura granulata Duclos, 1832

= Tenguella (gastropod) =

Genus of sea-snails

Tenguella is a genus of small, predatory sea snails, marine gastropod molluscs in the family Muricidae, the murex snails or rock snails.

== Description ==
Tenguella species have thick shells bearing regular dark nodules. In T. granulata and T. marginalba, the furrows between the nodules are a contrasting lighter colour. Fully-grown adult shells range from roughly 12 millimetres (0.47 in) for T. chinoi to 25 millimetres (0.98 in) for T. granulata. The nodulated appearance is reminiscent of a compound fruit, this is reflected in the common names such as "mulberry shell" and "granulated drupe".

They live on rocky shores in the intertidal zone or in shallow water, where they prey on other molluscs by drilling through their shells.

== Distribution ==
Species are found through the Indian Ocean and West Pacific (IWP), from eastern Africa to Australia, New Zealand, Pacific islands, and Japan. Most are tropical to sub-tropical, though T. marginalba is also found on temperate shores.

== Taxonomy ==
Tenguella was defined by Arakawa in 1965. The type species is Purpura granulata Duclos 1832. In 1985, Fujioka synonymised it with Morula.

In 2013, a gene-sequence analysis of 52 egalataxine species showed a clade containing M. granulata, that was related to Muricodrupa but more distant from the main Morula clade. The authors proposed resurrecting Arakawa's name Tenguella for this group.

== Species ==
As at 2019, the following species are included in Tenguella:

- Tenguella ceylonica (Dall, 1923)
- Tenguella chinoi Houart, Zuccon & Puillandre, 2019. Named in honour of the malacologist Mitsuo Chino.
- Tenguella ericius Houart, Zuccon & Puillandre, 2019. Ericius meaning hedgehog.
- Tenguella granulata (Duclos, 1832) – mulberry shell or granulated drupe.
- Tenguella hoffmani Houart, 2017
- Tenguella marginalba (Blainville, 1832) – the mulberry whelk.
- Tenguella musiva (Kiener, 1835) – the mosaic purpura or musical drupe.
