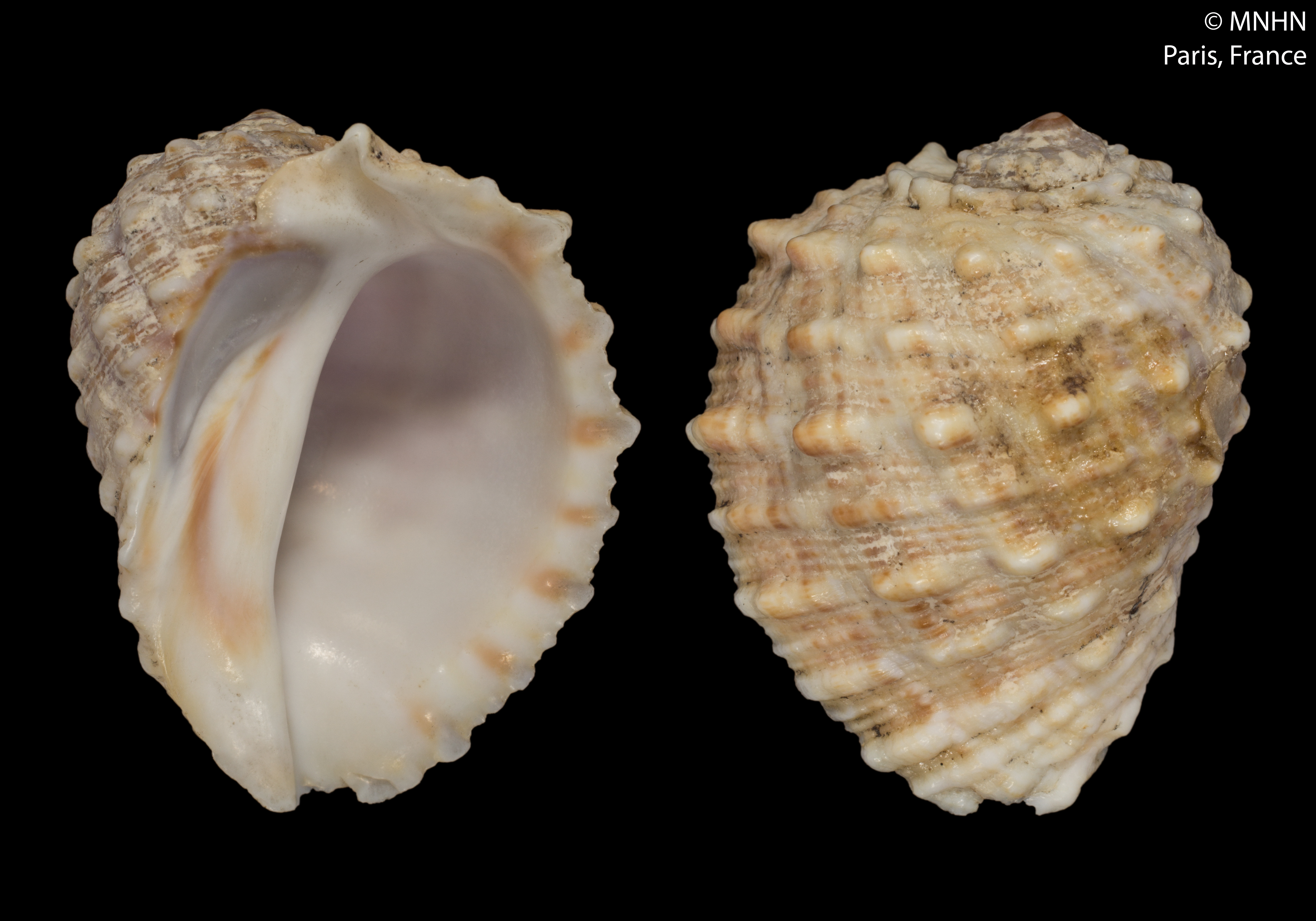
- Shell of Drupa aperta (syntype at MNHN, Paris)

Scientific classification
- Kingdom: Animalia
- Phylum: Mollusca
- Class: Gastropoda
- Subclass: Caenogastropoda
- Order: Neogastropoda
- Family: Muricidae
- Genus: Drupa
- Species: D. aperta

Binomial name
- Drupa aperta (Blainville, 1832)

Synonyms
- Purpura aperta Blainville, 1832 (basionym); Purpura hiulca Valenciennes, 1846; Purpura macrostoma Conrad, 1837; Thais (Thais) aperta Blainville, 1832

= Drupa aperta =

Species of gastropod

Drupa aperta is a species of sea snail, a marine gastropod mollusk in the family Muricidae, the murex snails or rock snails.
