= Tenguella ceylonica =

Scientific classification
- Kingdom: Animalia
- Phylum: Mollusca
- Class: Gastropoda
- Subclass: Caenogastropoda
- Order: Neogastropoda
- Family: Muricidae
- Genus: Tenguella
- Species: T. ceylonica

Binomial name
- Tenguella ceylonica (Dall, 1923)

Synonyms
- Morula (Morulina) ceylonica Dall, 1923

Species of gastropod

Tenguella ceylonica is a species of sea snail, a marine gastropod mollusk, in the family Muricidae, the murex snails or rock snails.
