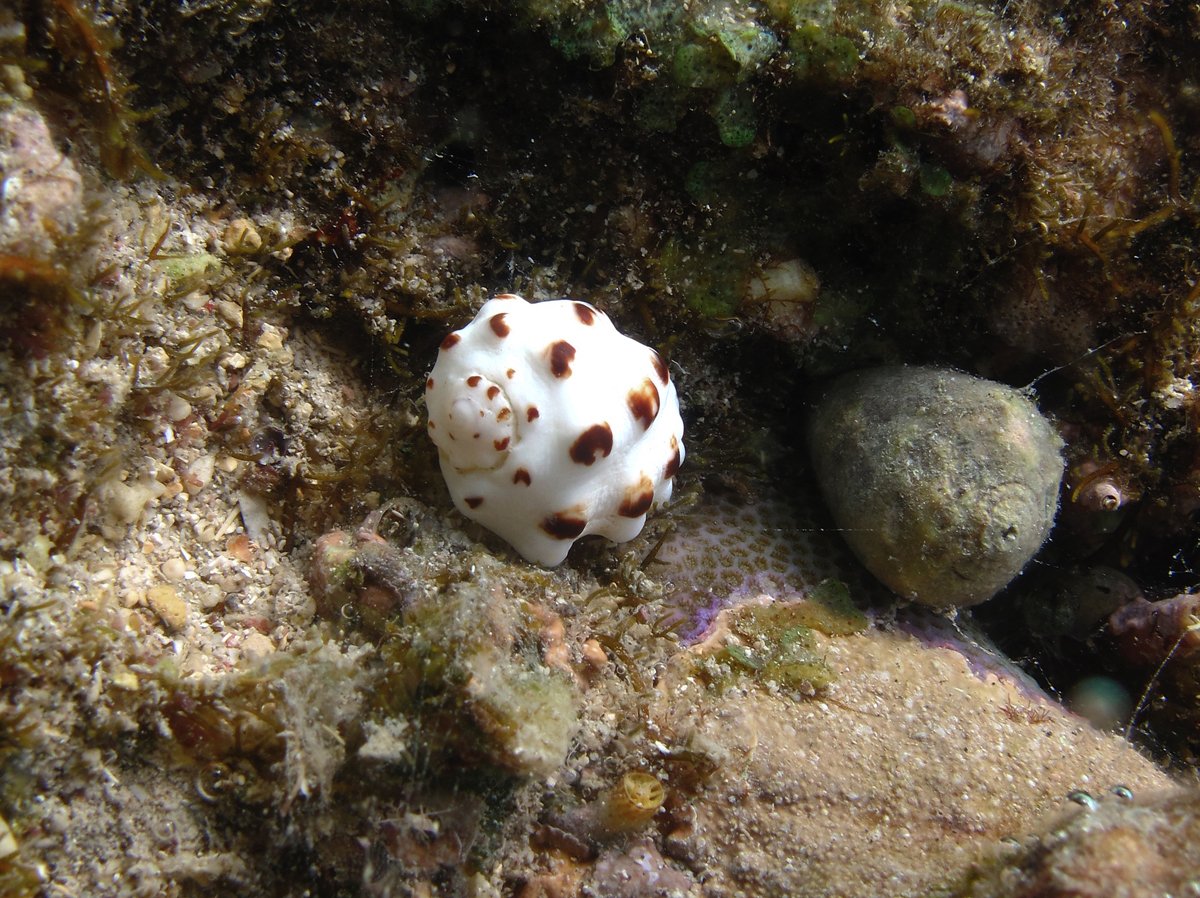

Scientific classification
- Kingdom: Animalia
- Phylum: Mollusca
- Class: Gastropoda
- Subclass: Caenogastropoda
- Order: Neogastropoda
- Superfamily: Muricoidea
- Family: Muricidae
- Subfamily: Rapaninae
- Genus: Drupa
- Species: D. albolabris

Binomial name
- Drupa albolabris (Blainville, 1832)

Synonyms
- Drupa (Drupa) ricinus albolabris (Blainville, 1832); Purpura albolabris Blainville, 1832

= Drupa albolabris =

Species of gastropod

Drupa albolabris is a species of sea snail, a marine gastropod mollusk, in the family Muricidae, the murex snails or rock snails.
