= Drupella minuta =

Scientific classification
- Kingdom: Animalia
- Phylum: Mollusca
- Class: Gastropoda
- Subclass: Caenogastropoda
- Order: Neogastropoda
- Family: Muricidae
- Genus: Drupella
- Species: D. minuta

Binomial name
- Drupella minuta Fujioka, 1984

Species of gastropod

Drupella minuta is a species of sea snail, a marine gastropod mollusk in the family Muricidae, the murex snails or rock snails.
