= Neothais nesiotes =

Scientific classification
- Kingdom: Animalia
- Phylum: Mollusca
- Class: Gastropoda
- Subclass: Caenogastropoda
- Order: Neogastropoda
- Family: Muricidae
- Genus: Neothais
- Species: N. nesiotes

Binomial name
- Neothais nesiotes (Dall, 1908)

Synonyms
- Thais nesiotes Dall, 1908

Species of gastropod

Neothais nesiotes is a species of sea snail, a marine gastropod mollusk in the family Muricidae, the murex snails or rock snails.
