= Drupa clathrata miticula =

Scientific classification
- Kingdom: Animalia
- Phylum: Mollusca
- Class: Gastropoda
- Subclass: Caenogastropoda
- Order: Neogastropoda
- Family: Muricidae
- Genus: Drupa
- Species: D. c. miticula

Binomial name
- Drupa clathrata miticula Lamarck, 1822

Synonyms
- Drupa (Ricinella) miticula Lamarck, 1822 · unaccepted; Drupa miticula (Lamarck, 1822); Drupa rubuscaesius var. miticula Lamarck, 1822 (unaccepted rank); Ricinula miticula Lamarck, 1822

Species of gastropod

Drupa clathrata miticula is a species of sea snail, a marine gastropod mollusk in the family Muricidae, the murex snails or rock snails.

This is a taxon inquirendum.
