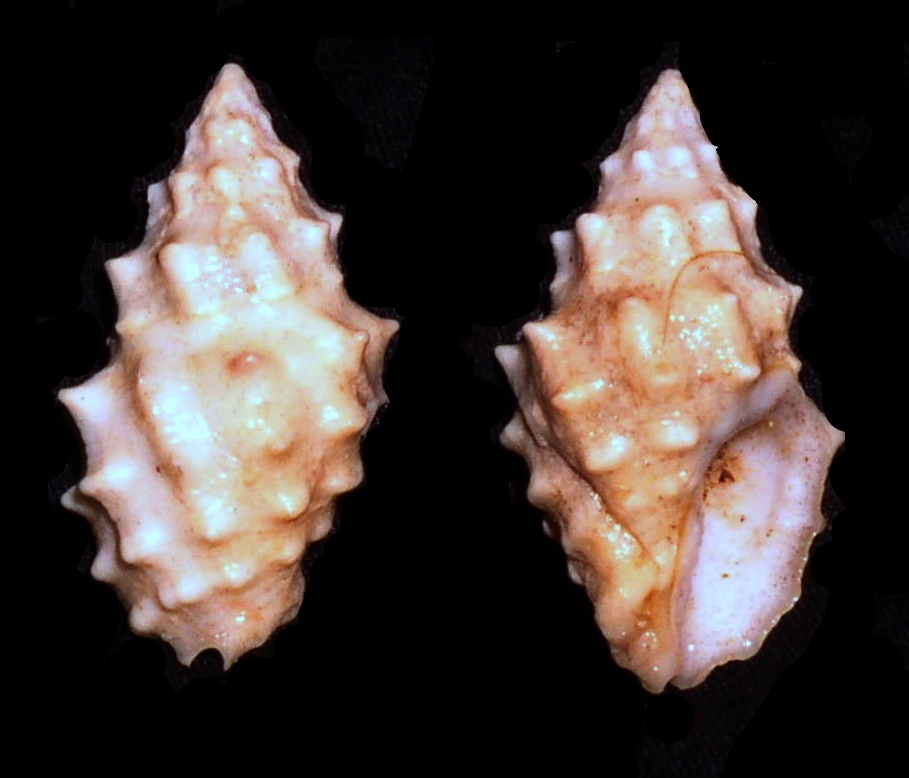
- Drupella cornus

Scientific classification
- Kingdom: Animalia
- Phylum: Mollusca
- Class: Gastropoda
- Subclass: Caenogastropoda
- Order: Neogastropoda
- Family: Muricidae
- Subfamily: Ergalataxinae
- Genus: Drupella; Thiele, 1925

Type species
- Drupa cornus Röding, 1798

= Drupella =

Genus of gastropods

Drupella is most commonly a genus of sea snails, marine gastropod mollusks in the family Muricidae, the murex snails or rock snails.

This genus was placed in the family Muricidae by Drivas & Jay, 1988 and by Richmond, 1997.

== Description ==
Drupella has extremely long, thin lateral teeth. The shells and radulae vary considerably even within species, complicating the taxonomy of the genus. The colour of the shell aperture varies from white to purple. Some species show sexual dimorphism in their radulae, with males having larger rachidian teeth than females.

== Diet ==
Snails of this genus are specialist predators of coral polyps.

== Species ==
Species within the genus Drupella include:

- Drupella cornus (Röding, 1798)
- Drupella eburnea (Küster, 1862)
- Drupella fragum (Blainville, 1832)
- Drupella minuta Fujioka, 1984
- Drupella rugosa (Born, 1778)
- Drupella margariticola

Species brought into synonymy

- Drupella cariosa Wood: synonym of Muricodrupa fenestrata (Blainville, 1832)
- Drupella fraga (Blainville, 1832) accepted as Drupella fragum (Blainville, 1832)
- Drupella ochrostoma (Blainville, 1832): synonym of Pascula ochrostoma (Blainville, 1832)
