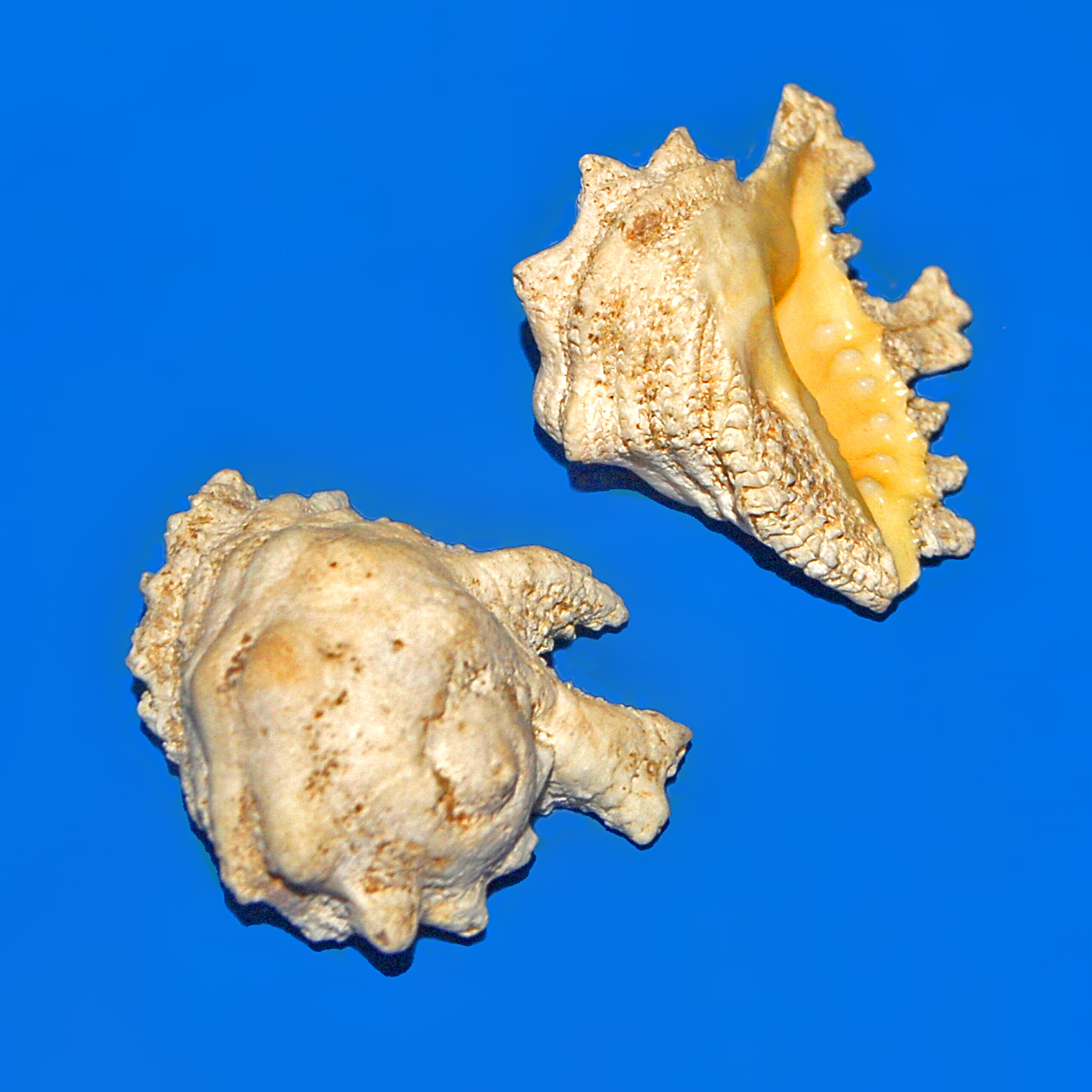
- Drupina grossularia

Scientific classification
- Kingdom: Animalia
- Phylum: Mollusca
- Class: Gastropoda
- Subclass: Caenogastropoda
- Order: Neogastropoda
- Superfamily: Muricoidea
- Family: Muricidae
- Subfamily: Rapaninae
- Genus: Drupina; Dall, W.H., 1923

Type species
- Ricinula digitata Lamarck, 1816

Synonyms
- Drupa (Drupina) Dall, 1923; Drupinia

= Drupina =

Genus of gastropods

Drupina is a genus of sea snail, a marine gastropod mollusk in the family Muricidae, the murex snails or rock snails.

== Species ==
- Drupina grossularia (Röding, 1798)
- Drupina lobata (Blainville, 1832)
