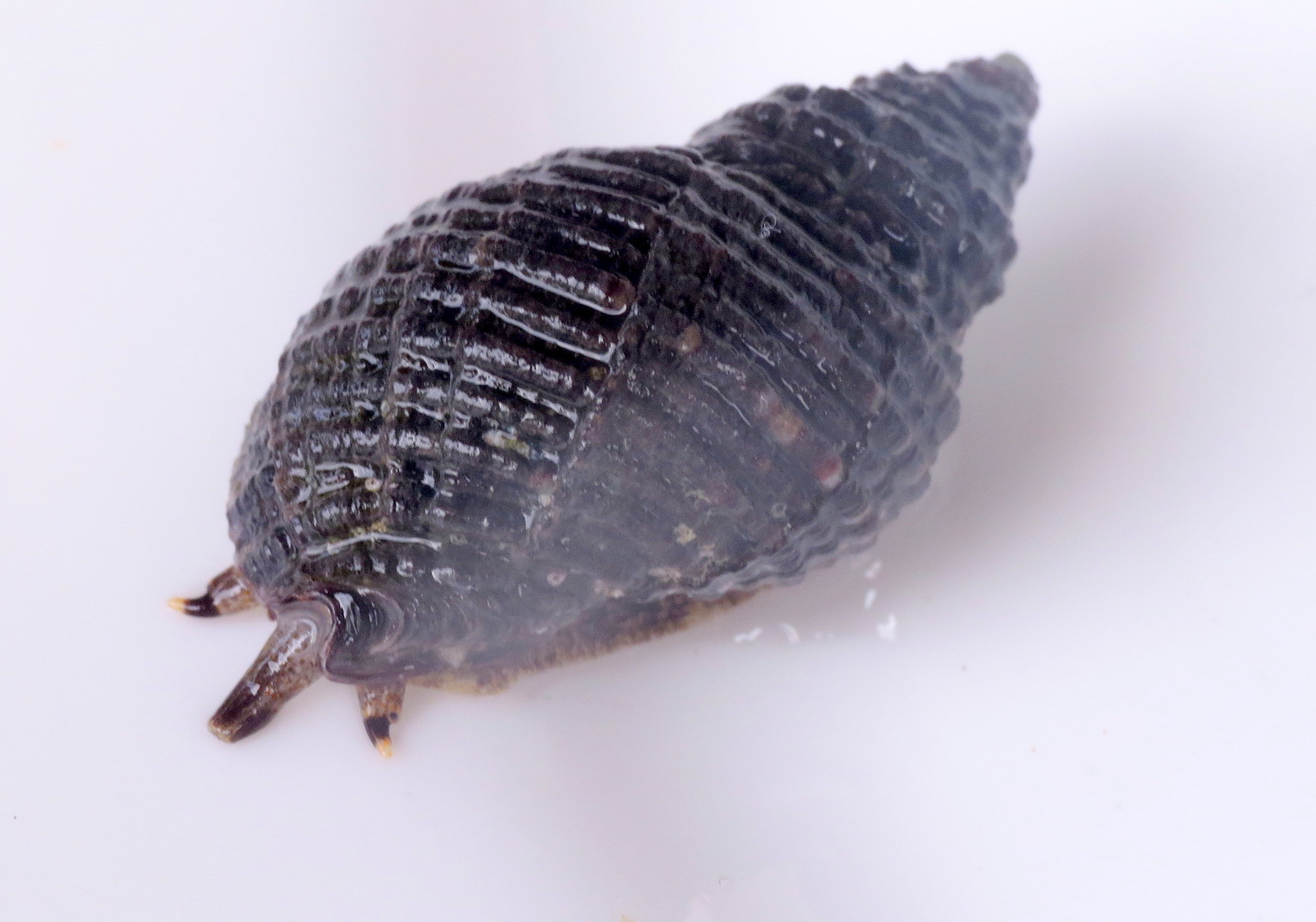

Scientific classification
- Kingdom: Animalia
- Phylum: Mollusca
- Class: Gastropoda
- Subclass: Caenogastropoda
- Order: Neogastropoda
- Family: Muricidae
- Genus: Neothais
- Species: N. harpa

Binomial name
- Neothais harpa (Conrad, 1837)

Synonyms
- Purpura harpa Conrad,1837

= Neothais harpa =

Species of gastropod

Neothais harpa, formerly known as Purpura harpa, is a species of sea snail, a marine gastropod mollusk in the family Muricidae, the murex snails or rock snails.

== Description ==
Shell sizes vary from medium to large. Known for raised spires and strong sculpture with spiral ridges. Sizes range from 20-29mm. Usually multi-colored ranging in colors from light brown to a dark brown complimenting a dark color within the shell. Known as a non-broadcast spawner. Functional group indicated is benthos.

== Distribution and habitat ==
Neothais harpa is endemic to Hawaii in the eastern-central Pacific Ocean. Found in marine environments, typically benthic and tropical. Commonly found basalt shorelines of the windward islands. Life cycle does not include trochophore stage. . Non-threatening to human life. Feeding type is a predatory Uncommon shell.

== Human use ==
Used in lei and possibly bait, unconfirmed.
