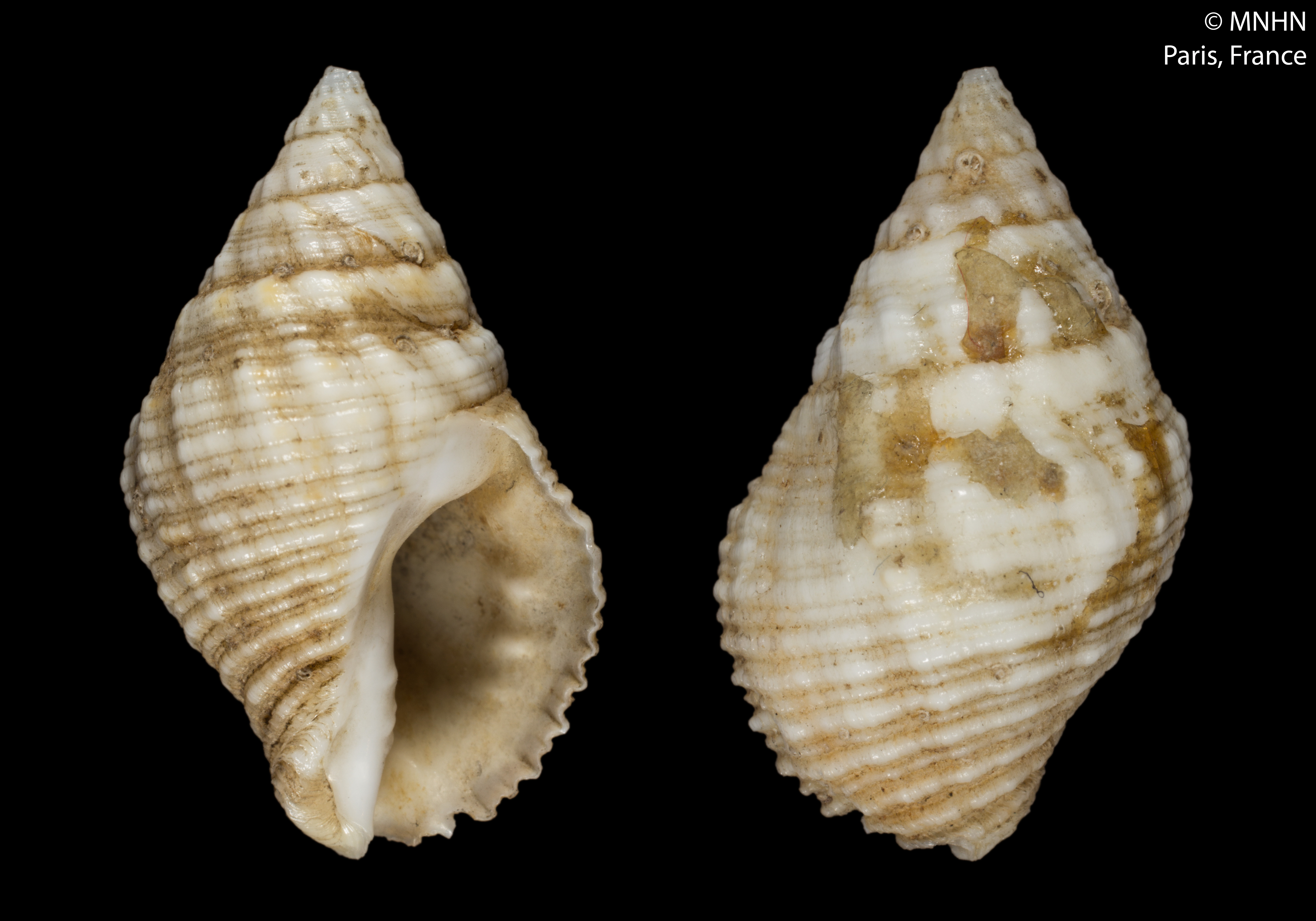

Scientific classification
- Kingdom: Animalia
- Phylum: Mollusca
- Class: Gastropoda
- Subclass: Caenogastropoda
- Order: Neogastropoda
- Family: Muricidae
- Genus: Drupella
- Species: D. fragum

Binomial name
- Drupella fragum (Blainville, 1832)

Synonyms
- Drupa vitiensis Pilsbry, 1918; Drupella fraga (Blainville, 1832); Purpura alba Hombron & Jacquinot, 1853; Purpura fragum Blainville, 1832; Ricinula dealbata Reeve, 1846

= Drupella fragum =

Species of gastropod

Drupella fragum is a species of sea snail, a marine gastropod mollusk in the family Muricidae, the murex snails or rock snails.

Powerful antioxidants were found in the midgut gland of Drupella fragum; which were brominated hydroxyindoles; the main compound isolated was 6-bromo-5-hydroxyindole and its positional isomers, such as 6-bromo-4,5-dihydroxyindole and 6-bromo-4,7-dihydroxyindole. Among other compounds, 6-methoxy-4,7-indoloquinone and 5-methyl-4,7-indoloquinone were also isolated.
