= Tenguella hoffmani =

Scientific classification
- Kingdom: Animalia
- Phylum: Mollusca
- Class: Gastropoda
- Subclass: Caenogastropoda
- Order: Neogastropoda
- Family: Muricidae
- Genus: Tenguella
- Species: T. hoffmani

Binomial name
- Tenguella hoffmani Houart, 2017

Species of gastropod

Tenguella hoffmani is a species of sea snail, a marine gastropod mollusk, in the family Muricidae, the murex snails or rock snails.

== Distribution ==
This species occurs in Oman.
