= Drupa elegans =

Scientific classification
- Kingdom: Animalia
- Phylum: Mollusca
- Class: Gastropoda
- Subclass: Caenogastropoda
- Order: Neogastropoda
- Family: Muricidae
- Genus: Drupa
- Species: D. elegans

Binomial name
- Drupa elegans (Broderip & Sowerby, 1829)

Synonyms
- Drupa (Drupa) elegans (Broderip & Sowerby, 1829); Ricinula elegans Broderip & Sowerby, 1829

Species of gastropod

Drupa elegans is a species of sea snail, a marine gastropod mollusk in the family Muricidae, the murex snails or rock snails.
