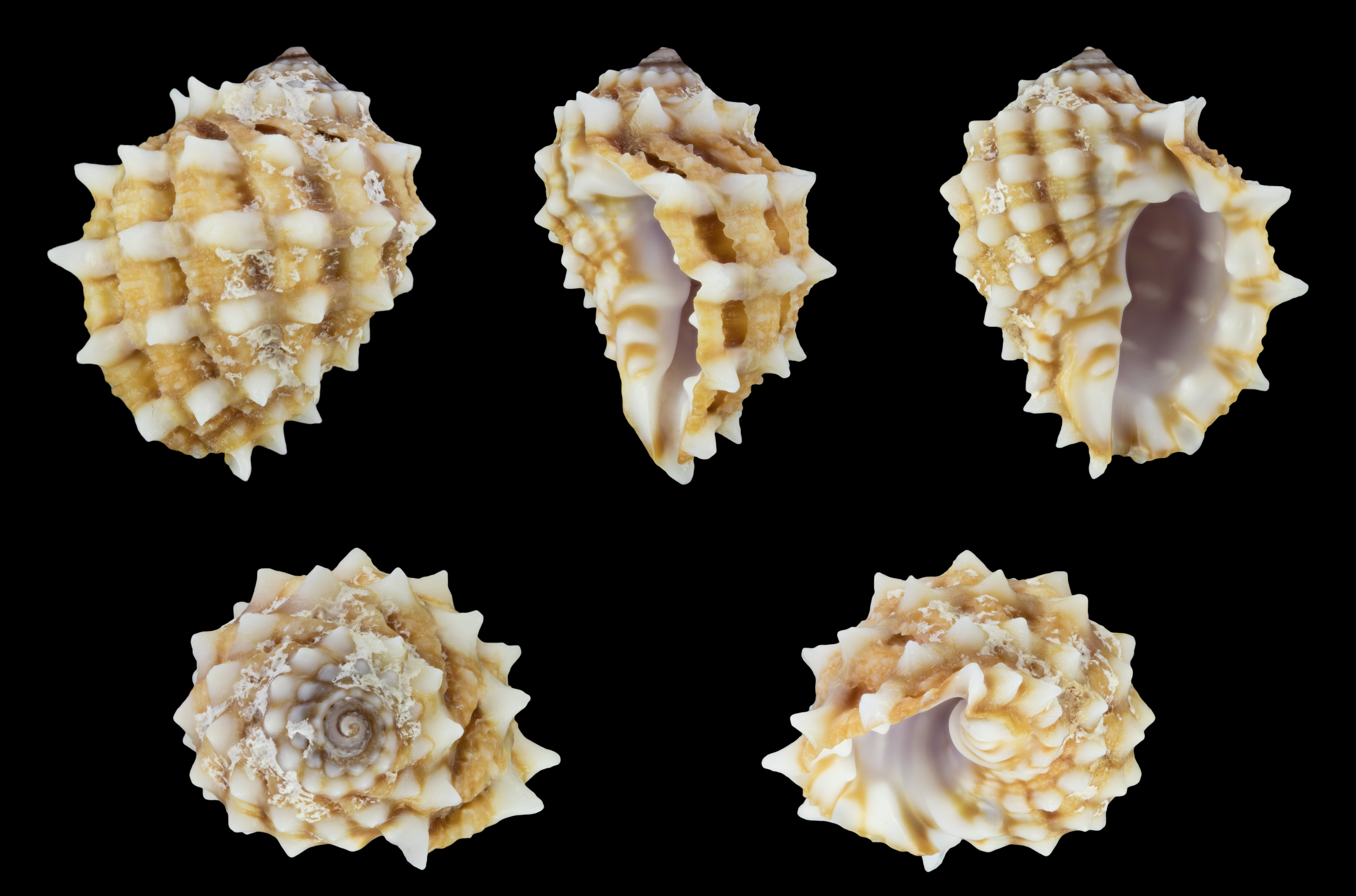

Scientific classification
- Kingdom: Animalia
- Phylum: Mollusca
- Class: Gastropoda
- Subclass: Caenogastropoda
- Order: Neogastropoda
- Family: Muricidae
- Genus: Drupa
- Species: D. clathrata

Binomial name
- Drupa clathrata (Lamarck, 1816)

Synonyms
- Drupa (Ricinella) clathrata (Lamarck, 1816); Ricinula clathrata Lamarck, 1816

= Drupa clathrata =

Species of gastropod

Drupa clathrata, common name: the clathrate drupe, is a species of sea snail, a marine gastropod mollusk in the family Muricidae, the murex snails or rock snails.

== Subspecies ==
- Drupa clathrata clathrata (Lamarck, 1816)
- Drupa clathrata miticula (Lamarck, 1822) (species inquirenda)

== Description ==
The shell size varies between 19 millimetres (0.7 in) and 40 millimetres (1.6 in).

== Distribution ==
This species is distributed in the Indian Ocean along Madagascar and in the South West Pacific Ocean.
