= Neothais lassa =

Scientific classification
- Kingdom: Animalia
- Phylum: Mollusca
- Class: Gastropoda
- Subclass: Caenogastropoda
- Order: Neogastropoda
- Superfamily: Muricoidea
- Family: Muricidae
- Subfamily: Rapaninae
- Genus: Neothais
- Species: †N. lassa

Binomial name
- †Neothais lassa Marwick, 1948

Extinct species of gastropod

Neothais lassa is an extinct species of sea snail, a marine gastropod mollusk, in the family Muricidae, the murex snails or rock snails.

== Distribution ==
This species occurs in New Zealand.
