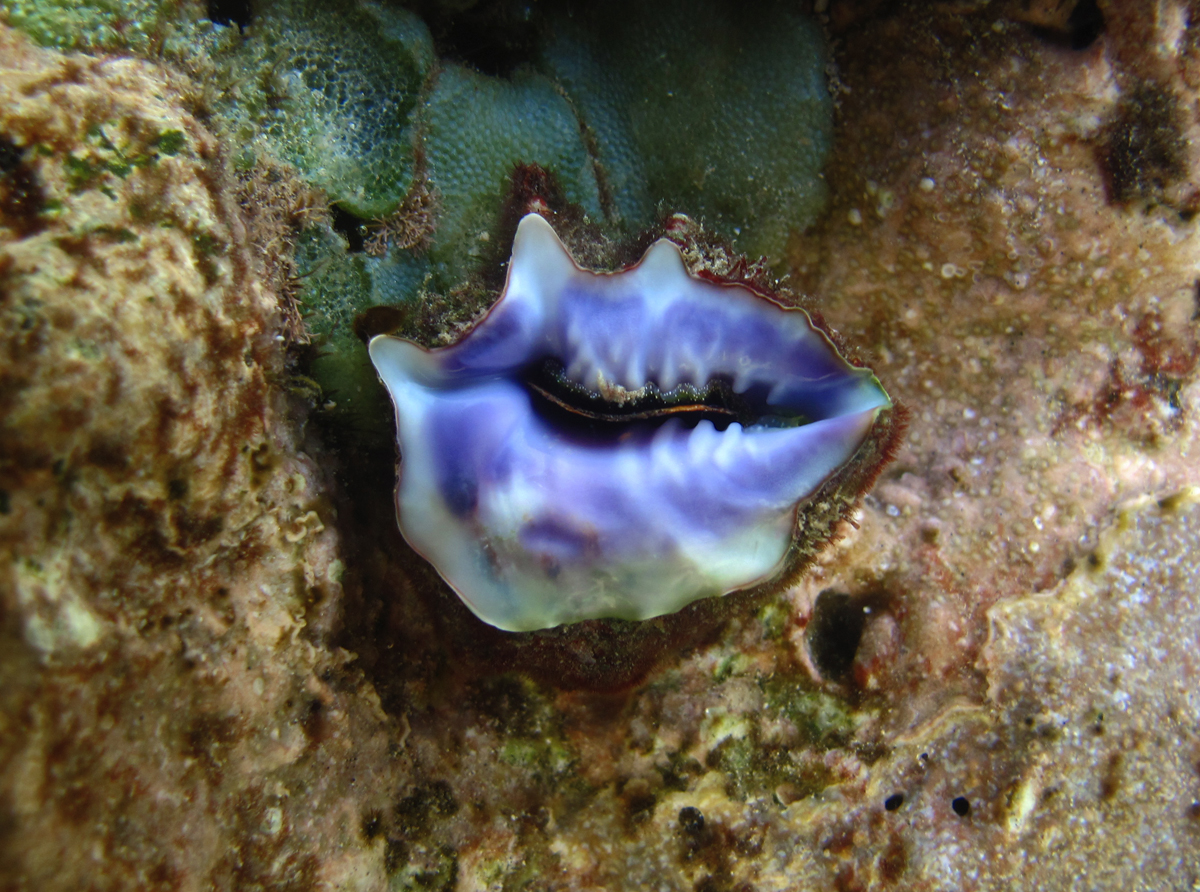
- Drupa denticulata

Scientific classification
- Kingdom: Animalia
- Phylum: Mollusca
- Class: Gastropoda
- Subclass: Caenogastropoda
- Order: Neogastropoda
- Family: Muricidae
- Genus: Drupa
- Species: D. denticulata

Binomial name
- Drupa denticulata Houart & Vilvens, 1997

Synonyms
- Drupa (Drupa) denticulata Houart & Vilvens, 1997

= Drupa denticulata =

Species of gastropod

Drupa denticulata is a species of sea snail, a marine gastropod mollusk in the family Muricidae, the murex snails or rock snails.
