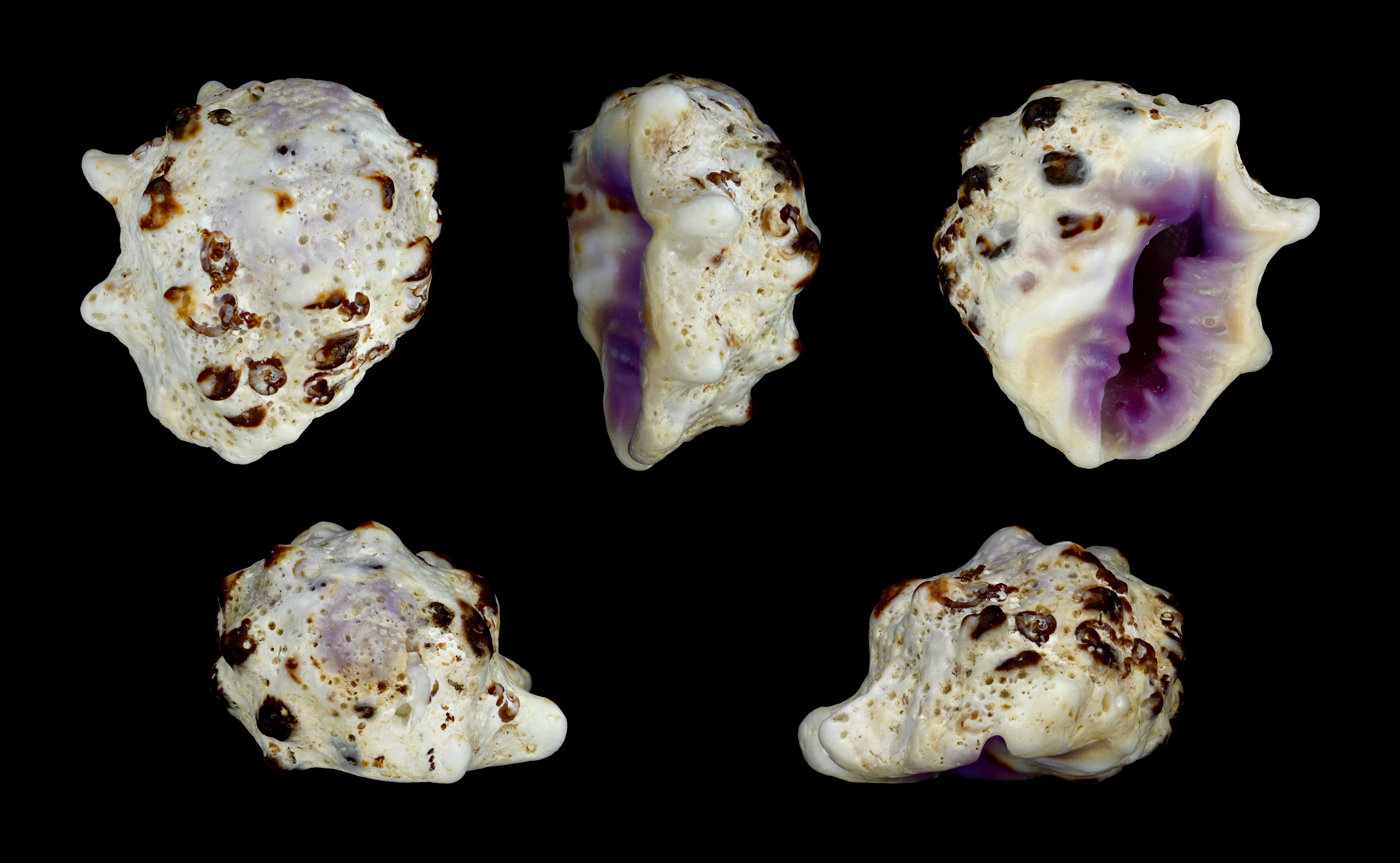
- A shell of Drupa morum morum

Scientific classification
- Kingdom: Animalia
- Phylum: Mollusca
- Class: Gastropoda
- Subclass: Caenogastropoda
- Order: Neogastropoda
- Family: Muricidae
- Genus: Drupa
- Species: D. morum

Binomial name
- Drupa morum Röding, 1798

Synonyms
- Canrena neritoidea Link, 1807; Drupa (Drupa) morum Röding, 1798; Drupa horrida (Lamarck, 1816); Drupa violacea (Schumacher, 1817); Ricinella violacea Schumacher, 1817; Ricinula globosa Mörch, 1852; Ricinula horrida Lamarck, 1816

= Drupa morum =

Species of gastropod

Drupa morum, commonly named purple drupe or makaloa in Hawaiian, is a species of sea snails, a marine gastropod mollusk in the family Muricidae, the murex snails or rock snails.

== Subspecies ==
- Drupa morum iodostoma (Lesson, 1840) (synonym : Purpura (Ricinula) iodostoma Lesson, 1840 ) (species inquirenda)
- Drupa morum morum Röding, 1798 (synonyms : Canrena neritoidea Link, 1807; Drupa horrida (Lamarck, 1816), Drupa morum Röding, 1798, Drupa (Drupa) morum morum Röding, 1798; Drupa violacea (Schumacher, 1817); Ricinella violacea Schumacher, 1817; Ricinula globosa Mörch, 1852; Ricinula horrida Lamarck, 1816)

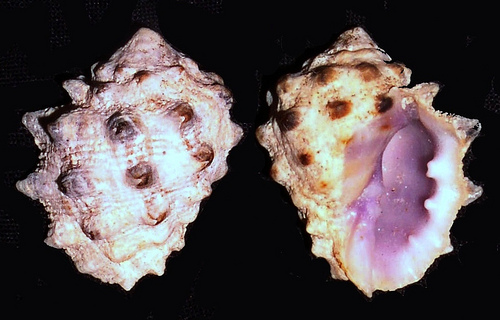
Drupa (Drupa) morum morum

== Description ==
Drupa morum has a thick, globose shell that can reach 5cm with a low spire, large body whorl and flat base that covers the surface of the body as it grows. The shell has a columella with three strong, plicate ridges. The outside layer is white with dark brown nodules, while in the inside appears a dark violet. The aperture is narrow and has conspicuous group of denticles. They are often covered with coralline algae.

== Distribution ==
Drupa morum lives in the subtropical and tropical Indo-Pacific, including the following locations:

- Madagascar
- Chinese taipei
- Hong kong
- India
- Indonesia
- Japan
- Philippines
- Clipperton I.
- Australia
- Easter I.
- French Polynesia
- Guam
- Hawaii
- New Caledonia
- North Marianas
- Pitcairn
- Tanzania

== Habitat ==
Drupa morum inhabits rocky shores and can be found in crevices among the lower eulittoral. It is abundant from shallow waters up to 30 feet deep, typically lives at a sea temperatures of 25-30 degrees Celsius and where the salinity is 30-35 PSU.

== Diet ==
Drupa morum feeds on Eunicid polychaetes and limestone-boring invertebrates in addition to many crustaceans, fishes, sipunculids, and vermetids.
