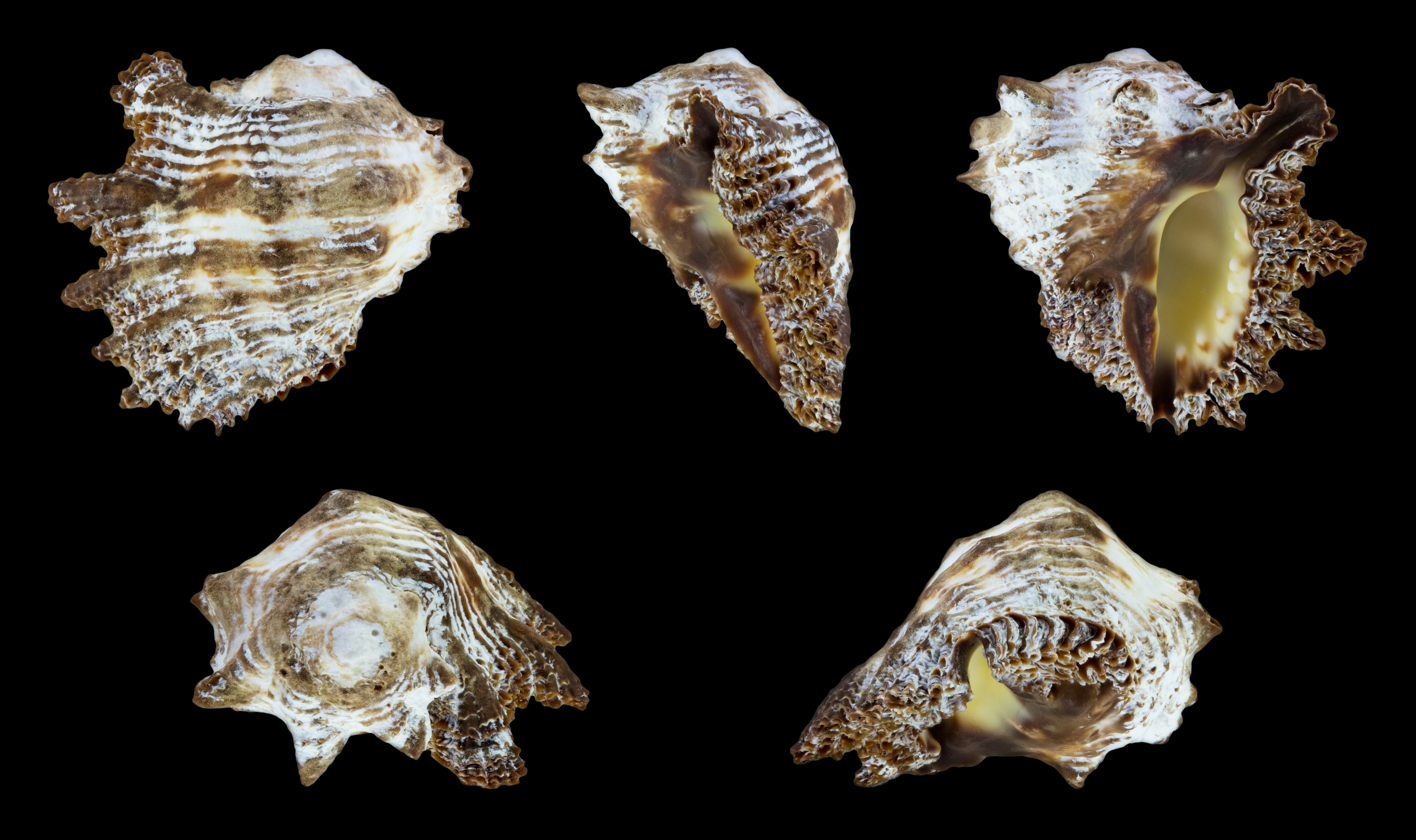

Scientific classification
- Kingdom: Animalia
- Phylum: Mollusca
- Class: Gastropoda
- Subclass: Caenogastropoda
- Order: Neogastropoda
- Family: Muricidae
- Genus: Drupina
- Species: D. lobata

Binomial name
- Drupina lobata (Blainville, 1832)

Synonyms
- Drupa (Drupina) lobata (Blainville, 1832); Drupa lobata (Blainville, 1832); Purpura lobata Blainville, 1832

= Drupina lobata =

Species of gastropod

Drupina lobata is a species of sea snail, a marine gastropod mollusk in the family Muricidae, the murex snails or rock snails.
