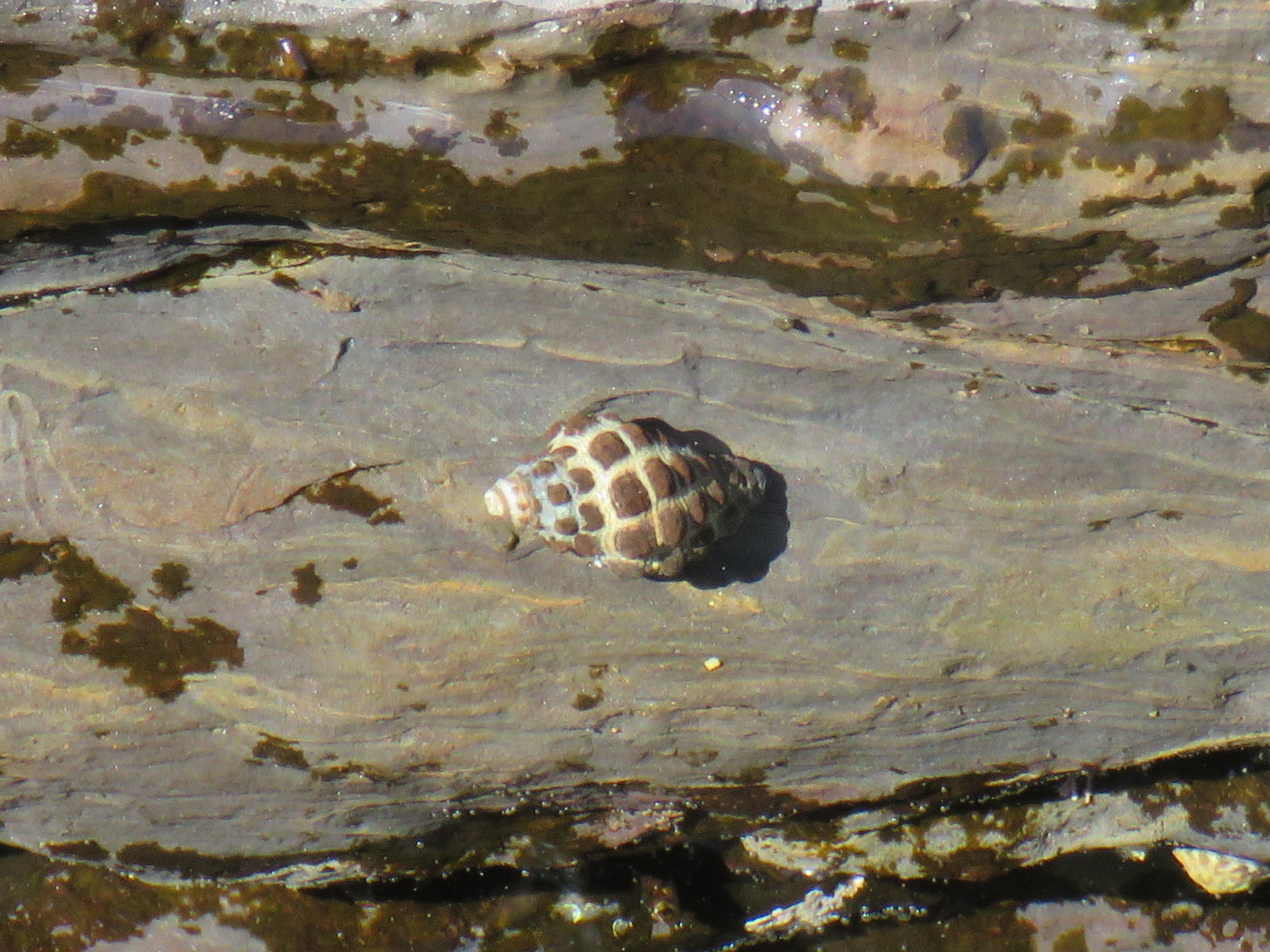

Scientific classification
- Kingdom: Animalia
- Phylum: Mollusca
- Class: Gastropoda
- Subclass: Caenogastropoda
- Order: Neogastropoda
- Family: Muricidae
- Genus: Tenguella
- Species: T. marginalba

Binomial name
- Tenguella marginalba (Blainville, 1832)

Synonyms
- Morula (Morula) marginalba (Blainville, 1832); Purpura marginalba Blainville, 1832

= Tenguella marginalba =

Species of gastropod

Tenguella marginalba is a species of sea snail, a marine gastropod mollusc in the family Muricidae, the murex snails or rock snails. It is commonly known as the mulberry whelk and is found in shallow waters in the Indo-Pacific and around the north and east coasts of Australia.

== Description ==
The mulberry whelk has a strong, robust shell and can grow to about 35 mm (1.4 in) but a more normal adult size is 20 mm (0.8 in). Each body whorl has five rows of purple or blackish, roughly square, nodules separated by pale grey areas with fine sculptured vertical and horizontal lines. The lip is curved with four similar-sized ridges or teeth on its inner surface. The columella, or central axis, is white and is stout with a smooth surface. The interior of the shell is purple-grey, contrasting with the cream teeth and lip.

== Distribution and habitat ==
The mulberry whelk is found on the north and east coasts of Australia and on islands in the central Indo-Pacific Ocean. In Australia, its range extends from the north west tip to Twofold Bay in New South Wales. It is common on rocks in the intertidal zone where adults hide in cracks. It is also found in estuaries where it is known as the black oyster borer because it feeds on oysters where it is regarded as a pest.

== Biology ==
The mulberry whelk is a predator feeding almost exclusively on molluscs and barnacles. It has an extensible rasping radula with which it drills a hole through it victim's shell. The process is believed to be assisted by the sulphuric acid it produces in its salivary glands which helps to soften and dissolve the calcium carbonate in the mollusc's shell. It then uses its radula to cut the soft body of its victim in pieces before sucking the semidigested mass out. The mulberry whelk does not usually move around much when both crevices in which to hide and prey species are in the vicinity. This is in contrast to the rather similar Thais orbita which makes foraging movements up the beach well away from the sheltered niches to which it retreats at low tide. Favoured prey includes oysters and the limpet Patelloida latistrigata. The barnacle Chamaesipho columna was also eaten, but was avoided when more attractive prey was present.
