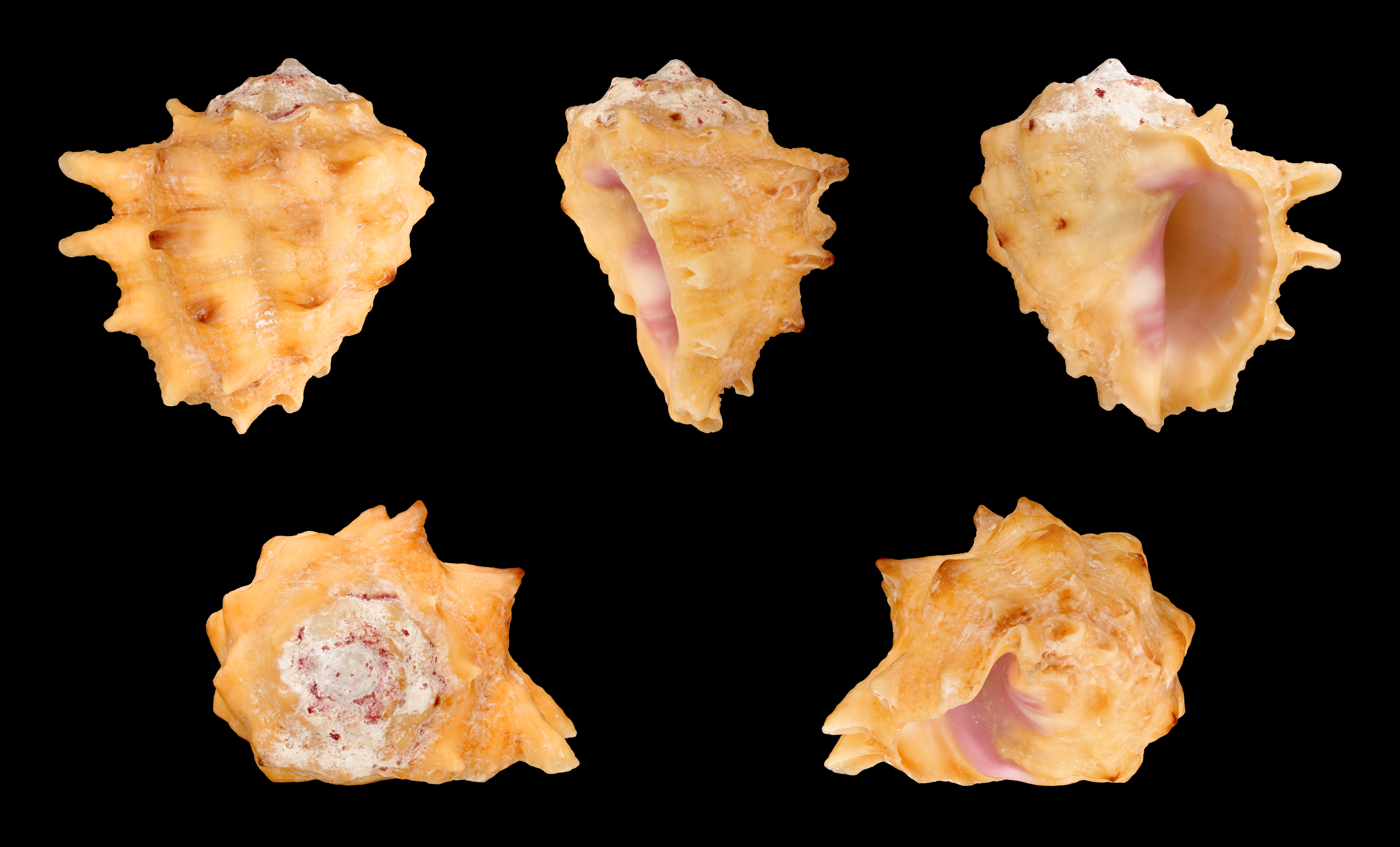

Scientific classification
- Kingdom: Animalia
- Phylum: Mollusca
- Class: Gastropoda
- Subclass: Caenogastropoda
- Order: Neogastropoda
- Family: Muricidae
- Genus: Drupa
- Species: D. rubusidaeus

Binomial name
- Drupa rubusidaeus Röding, 1798

Synonyms
- Drupa fragum Röding, P.F., 1798; Drupa rubusidaeus Röding, 1798; Drupa (Ricinella) purpurata Schumacher, H.C.F., 1817; Drupa spathulifera (Blainville, 1832); Murex hippocastanum Wood, 1825; Murex hystrix Link, H.F., 1807; Purpura spathulifera Blainville, 1832; Ricinella purpurata Schumacher, 1817; Ricinula reeveana Crosse, 1862; Ricinula miticula Lamarck, J.B.P.A. de, 1822

= Drupa rubusidaeus =

Species of gastropod

Drupa (Ricinella) rubusidaeus, common name the strawberry drupe, is a species of sea snail, a marine gastropod mollusk in the family Muricidae, the murex snails or rock snails.

== Description ==
The shell size varies between 20 mm and 60 mm.

== Distribution ==
This species is distributed in the Red Sea and in the Indian Ocean along Aldabra, Chagos, the Mascarene Basin, Mauritius and Tanzania and in the Indo-West Pacific.
