= Neothais smithi =

Scientific classification
- Kingdom: Animalia
- Phylum: Mollusca
- Class: Gastropoda
- Subclass: Caenogastropoda
- Order: Neogastropoda
- Family: Muricidae
- Genus: Neothais
- Species: N. smithi

Binomial name
- Neothais smithi (Brazier, 1889)

Synonyms
- Purpura bollonsi Suter, 1906; Purpura smithi Brazier, 1889

Species of gastropod

Neothais smithi is a species of sea snail, a marine gastropod mollusc in the family Muricidae, the murex snails or rock snails.
