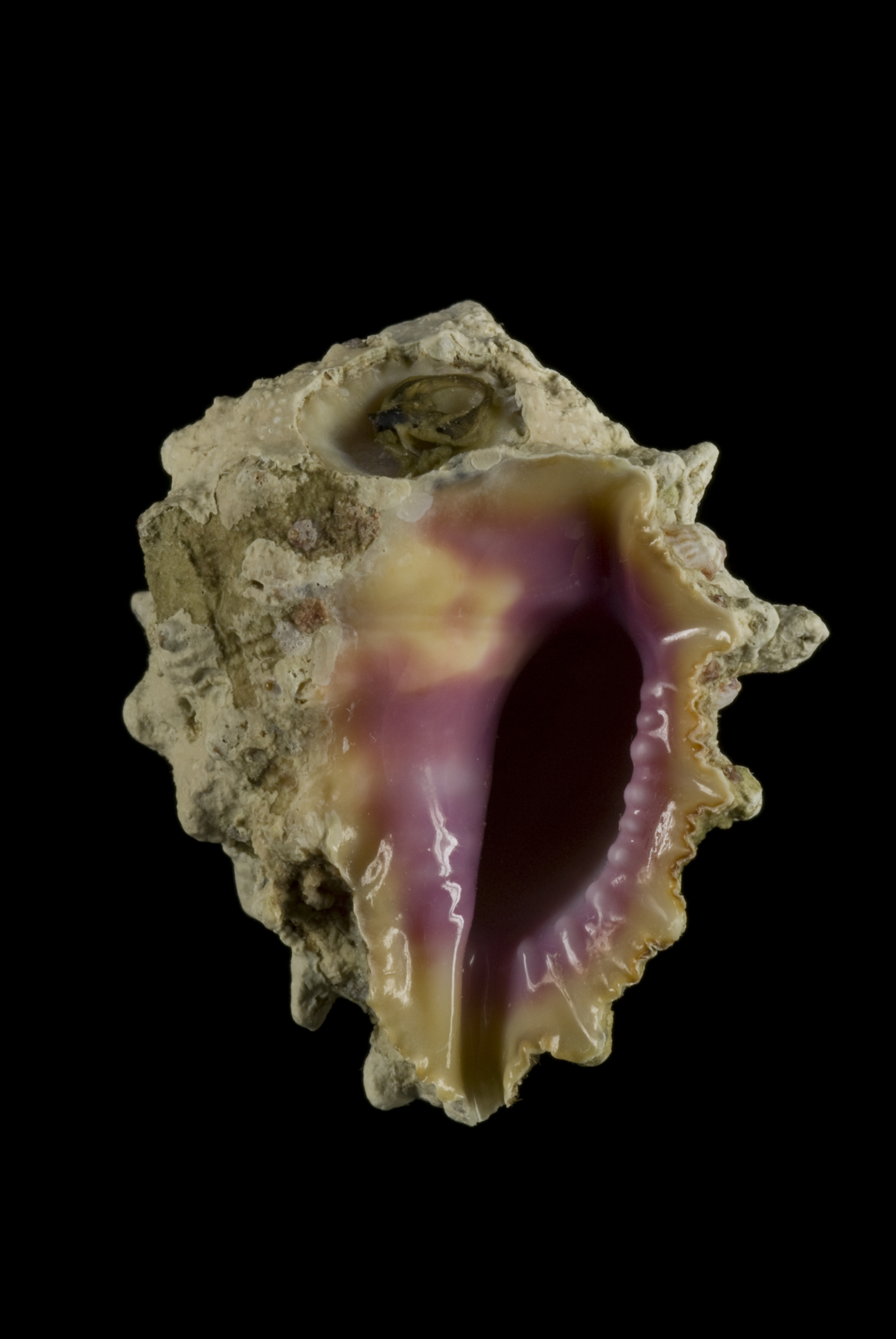
- Shell of Drupa speciosa (specimen at MNHN, Paris)

Scientific classification
- Kingdom: Animalia
- Phylum: Mollusca
- Class: Gastropoda
- Subclass: Caenogastropoda
- Order: Neogastropoda
- Family: Muricidae
- Genus: Drupa
- Species: D. speciosa

Binomial name
- Drupa speciosa (Dunker, 1867)

Synonyms
- Drupa (Ricinella) speciosa (Dunker, 1867); Ricinula speciosa Dunker, 1867 (basionym)

= Drupa speciosa =

Species of gastropod

Drupa speciosa is a species of sea snail, a marine gastropod mollusk in the family Muricidae, the murex snails or rock snails.
