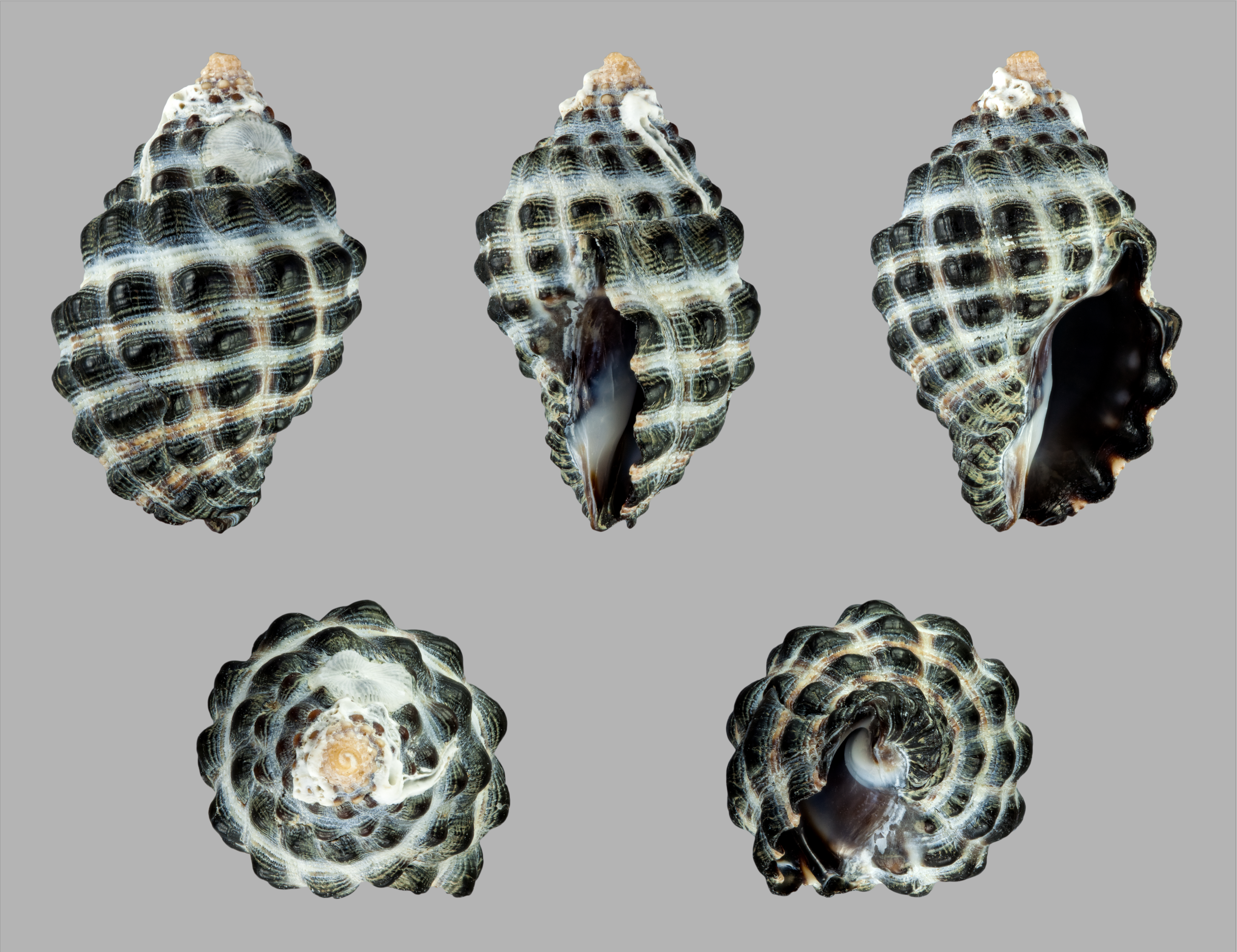
- A shell of Tenguella granulata

Scientific classification
- Kingdom: Animalia
- Phylum: Mollusca
- Class: Gastropoda
- Subclass: Caenogastropoda
- Order: Neogastropoda
- Family: Muricidae
- Genus: Tenguella
- Species: T. granulata

Binomial name
- Tenguella granulata (Duclos, 1832)

Synonyms
- Drupa granulata (Duclos, 1832); Drupa tuberculata (Blainville, 1832); Morula (Morulina) ceylonica Dall, 1923; Morula tuberculata (Blainville, 1832); Morula granulata; Purpura cingulifera Kiener, 1835; Purpura granulata Duclos, 1832 (basionym); Purpura tuberculata Blainville, 1832; Ricinula tuberculata (Blainville, 1832); Sistrum chrysalis Sowerby, G.B. III, 1904; Sistrum granulatum Duclos, 1832

= Tenguella granulata =

Species of gastropod

Tenguella granulata, common name the mulberry shell or the granulated drupe, is a species of sea snail, a marine gastropod mollusk in the family Muricidae, the murex snails or rock snails.

== Description ==
The shell size varies between 18 mm and 30 mm. The conical, oblong shell is compact and contains no varices. It is covered with dark brown to black blunt knobs on a white background with spiral cords between the rows. The body whorl is covered with six rows of nodules. The outer lip is dentate with four to five teeth within. The narrow aperture is blackish. The columella and the inner lip are white.

This globular shape, tight shell coiling, strong sculpture, a dentate outer lip and narrow aperture offers an added protection against shell-crushing predators, such as fishes and crabs.

This mollusc is a predator and feeds by drilling sedentary or semi-mobile prey. It eats only other molluscs, mainly gastropods of the genera Cerithium, Rissoina, Heliacus, and Bittium, and the mussel Hormomya.

Imposex in Morula granulata is a bioindicator for the presence of tributyltin (TBT) contamination (an anti-fouling paint for boats which affects females of the species).

== Distribution ==
This species is can be found on a rocky substrate or reef flats in the intertidal zone. It is distributed in the Red Sea, in the Indian Ocean off Aldabra Atoll, Chagos, East Coast of South Africa, Transkei, Natal, Kenya, Madagascar, the Mascarene Basin, Mozambique and Tanzania, and in the Indo-West Pacific; also off Australia (Northern Territory, Queensland, Western Australia).

Fossils have been found in Quaternary strata of the Seychelles and Vanuatu, age range: 0.126 to 0.012 Ma
