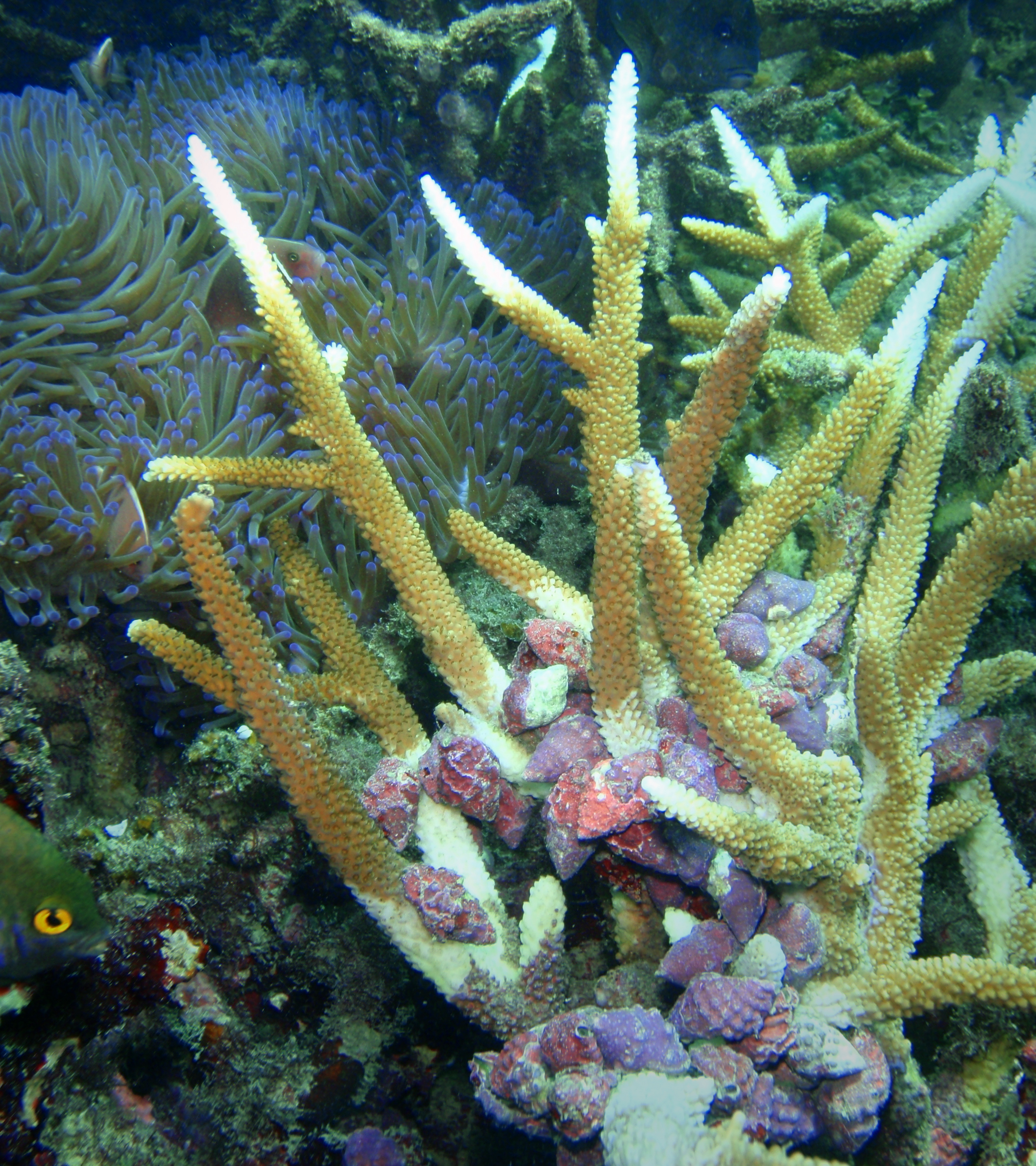
- Feeding aggregation of Drupella Rugosa snails on Acropora branching corals on the island of Koh Tao, Thailand.

Scientific classification
- Kingdom: Animalia
- Phylum: Mollusca
- Class: Gastropoda
- Subclass: Caenogastropoda
- Order: Neogastropoda
- Family: Muricidae
- Genus: Drupella
- Species: D. rugosa

Binomial name
- Drupella rugosa (Born, 1778)

Synonyms
- Murex concatenata Lamarck, 1822; Morula concatenata (Lamarck, 1822); Murex concatenata Lamarck, 1822; Murex rugosa Born, 1778; Purpura alveolata Reeve, 1846; Purpura fragum Blainville, 1832; Purpura subturrita Blainville, 1832; Ricinula concatenata (Lamarck, 1822)

= Drupella rugosa =

Species of gastropod

Drupella rugosa, common name the rugose drupe, is a species of sea snail, a marine gastropod mollusk in the family Muricidae, the murex snails or rock snails.

== Description ==
Drupella rugosa is a creamy white to orange, conical shell with a height between 20 mm and 35 mm. The sculpture shows five spiral rows of rounded brown nodules separated by twelve axial ribs with fine granules, giving the shell a knobby appearance. The columella is narrow and the anal sinus hardly shows. The elliptical aperture is narrowed by protruding plaits. The outer lip is with five or six teeth.

== Feeding patterns ==
Drupella rugosa is an obligate corallivore that grazes on the tissue of live corals, especially fast growing or structurally diverse corals such as Acropora and Montipora. Over-populations or outbreaks of the snail have been recorded in multiple regions since the 1980s, and generally occur on reefs impacted by human activities or following mass mortality events such as coral bleaching. D. rugosa is known to contribute to secondary mortality following such events, and have also been linked to increased prevalence of coral diseases.

== Distribution and reproduction ==
This species is distributed in the intertidal zone and shallow rocky areas in the Red Sea and in the Indian Ocean along Aldabra, Chagos, Madagascar, the Mascarene Basin, the Gulf of Thailand, and in the Western Pacific. Little is known about their reproductive cycle, however it was recently documented in the Gulf of Thailand that they use the skeletons of the corals they have recently consumed on which to lay their benthic eggs, particularly on corals of the Fungiidae family.
