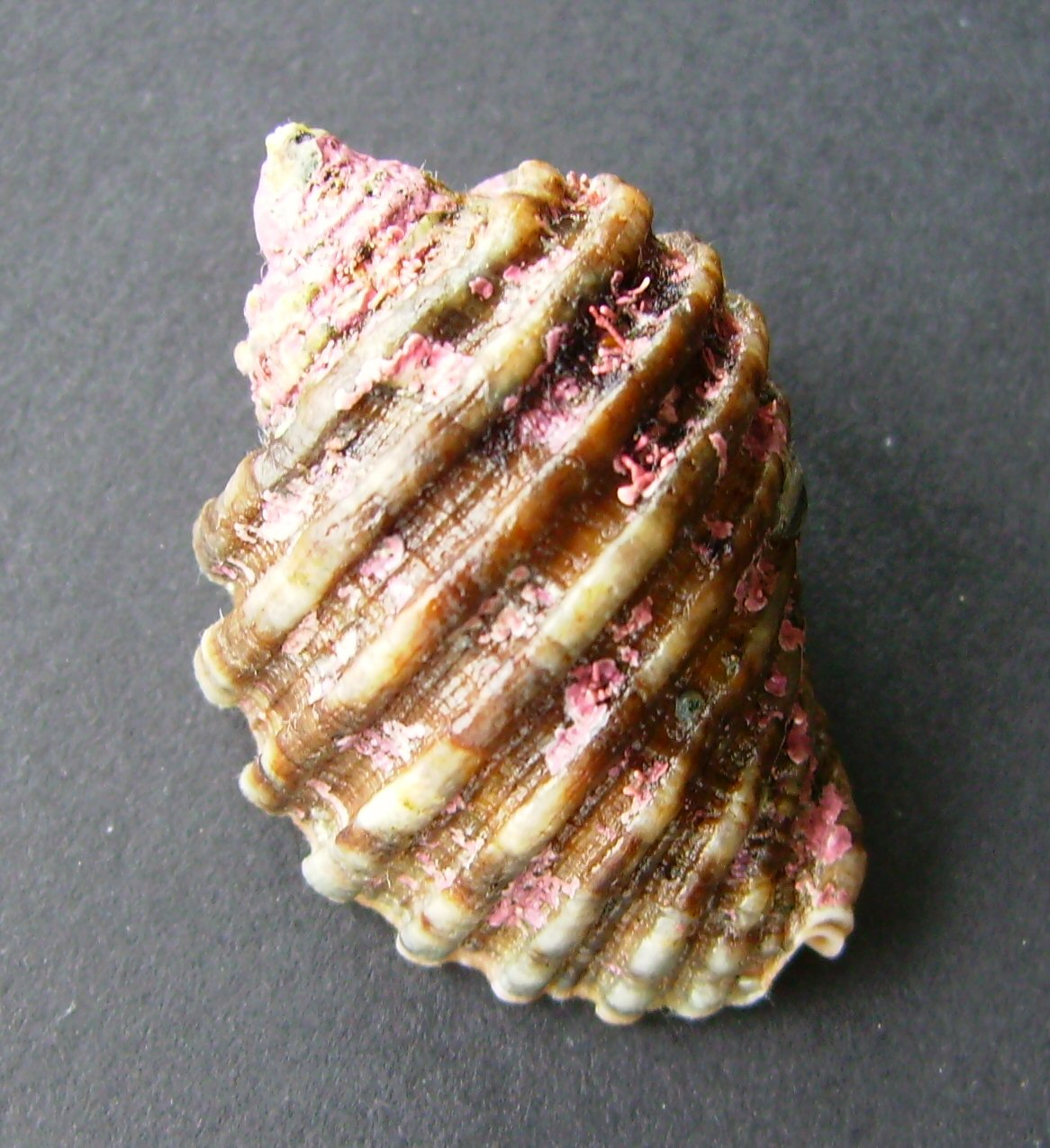
- Dorsal view of a shell of Dicathais orbita
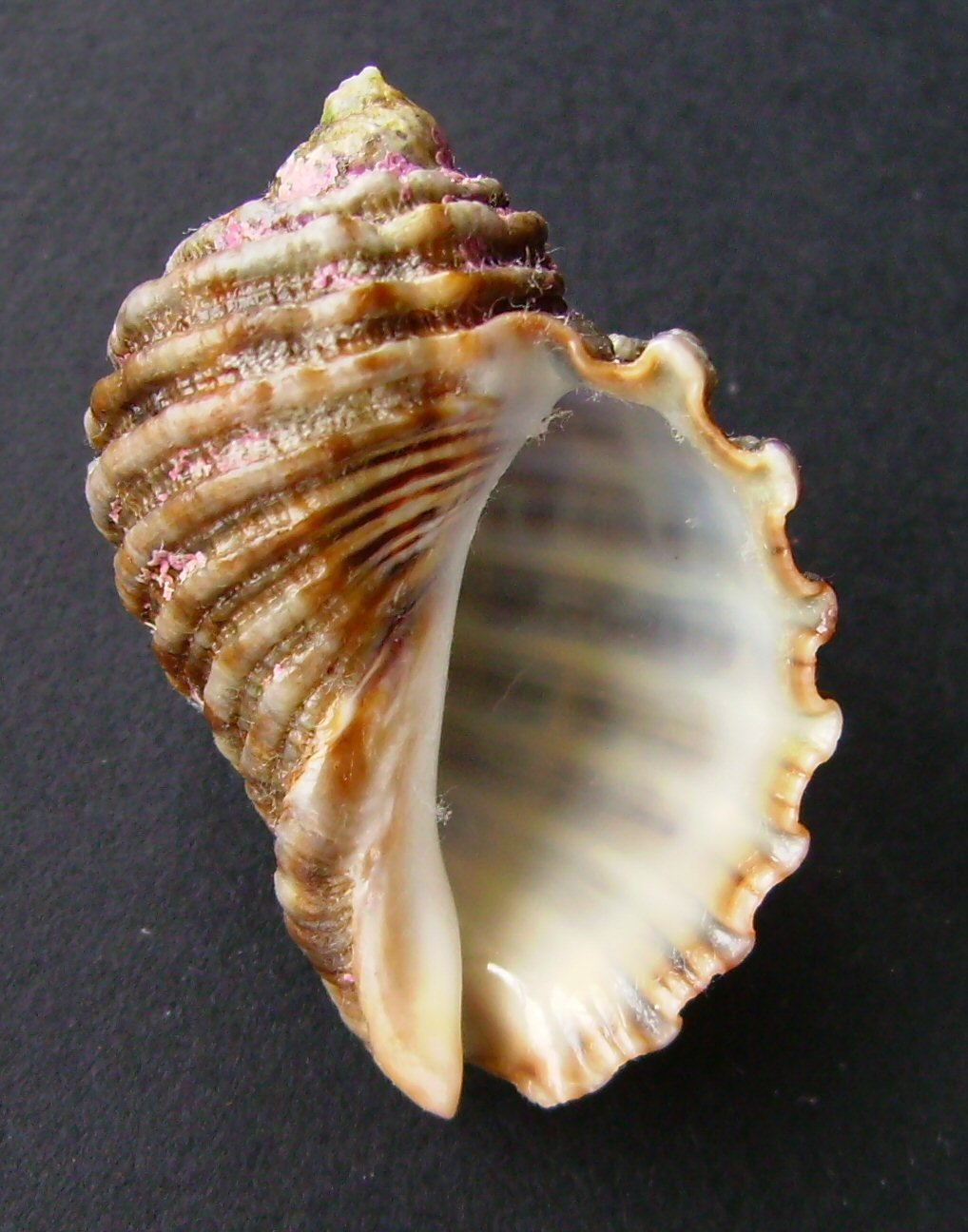
- Apertural view showing the deep crenulations

Scientific classification
- Kingdom: Animalia
- Phylum: Mollusca
- Class: Gastropoda
- Subclass: Caenogastropoda
- Order: Neogastropoda
- Family: Muricidae
- Genus: Dicathais; Iredale, 1936
- Species: D. orbita

Binomial name
- Dicathais orbita (Gmelin, 1791)

Synonyms
- Buccinum orbita Gmelin, 1791; Dicathais aegrota (Reeve, 1846); Dicathais scalaris (Menke, 1829); Dicathais textilosa (Lamarck, 1816); Dicathais vector Thornley, 1952); Haustrum ventricosum Kaicher, 1980; Neothais scalaris (Menke, 1829); Polytropa succincta (Lamarck, 1816); Purpura aegrota Reeve, 1846; Purpura scalaris Menke, 1829; Purpura succincta Lamarck, 1816; Purpura textilosa Lamarck, 1816; Thais orbita (Gmelin, 1791); Thais textilosa (Lamarck, 1816)

= Dicathais =

Genus of gastropods

Dicathais is a genus of predatory sea snails, marine gastropod molluscs in the family Muricidae, the rock snails. This genus is monotypic; the only species in it is Dicathais orbita, common name the white rock shell or cart-rut shell, found round the coasts of Australia and New Zealand.

== Description ==
The white rock shell is large with a strong shell usually about 6 centimetres (2.4 in) long, but occasionally growing to twice this size. It shows great variation in its shell sculpture across its range. In eastern Australia there are seven to nine deeply indented ribs in each whorl with clefts of a similar width between them, sculptured with further fine riblets. This gives a fluted edge to the lip and the grooves can also be seen on the interior surface of the shell. The central column or columella is smooth and the interior of the shell is white.

The western Australian form has a row of well marked nodules rather than ridges and an unindented lip while the southern Australian form has much less distinct ridges and a nearly smooth lip. At one time it was thought that these different forms were distinct species but it has now been established that the variations in sculpture are a function of different living conditions. Specimens gathered from New South Wales with deep ridges were kept in a still water aquarium for three years during which time the new shell growth was at first shallowly indented and later was smooth.

The colour of the shell is generally creamy white or grey, often with a thin yellowish line round the margin of the lip. Juveniles have thinner shells and are often brown.

== Distribution and habitat ==
This snail is plentiful in the intertidal zone and sublittoral zone on rocks and among seaweed around the coasts of Australia (New South Wales, Queensland, South Australia, Tasmania, Victoria, Western Australia), New Zealand, Kermadec Islands and Lord Howe Island.

== Biology ==
The white rock shell is a predator, cannibal and scavenger. It uses its radula to bore a hole in the shell of a barnacle or mollusc and then sucks out the contents. Prey species include the sea snails Lunella torquata, Cronia avellana and Pyrene bidentata, and the mussel Septifer bilocularis. As the tide rises, the white rock shell makes foraging expeditions up the beach, travelling far away from the sheltered niches to which it retreats at low tide. This is in contrast to the mulberry whelk Morula marginalba which shares the same habitat but remains in an area where there are both crevices in which to hide and prey species on which to feed.

The sexes are separate in the white rock shell. The eggs that develop in the female gonoduct are wrapped in a number of membranes to form an egg capsule. Several of these are joined together in an egg mass and attached to the substrate. Different precursors of the pigment Tyrian purple have been found in the male and female gonoducts and in the egg capsule. Early development of the larvae takes place inside the capsule which contains yolk granules on which they feed. When they have developed to the veliger stage, the larvae emerge from the capsule and become planktonic. After drifting with the currents for a while, these settle on the seabed, undergo metamorphosis and become juvenile snails.

== Bibliography ==
- Gmelin J.F. 1791. Caroli a Linné. Systema Naturae per regna tria naturae, secundum classes, ordines, genera, species, cum characteribus, differentiis, synonymis, locis. Lipsiae : Georg. Emanuel. Beer Vermes. Vol. 1 (Part 6) pp. 3021–3910.
- Menke, K.T. 1829. Verzeichniss der ansehnlischen Conchylien-Sammlung der Freiherrn von der Malsburg. Pyrmonti : Publisher not known pp. i–vi, 1–123.
- Reeve, L.A. 1846. Monograph of the genus Purpura. pls 1-13 in Reeve, L.A. (ed). Conchologia Iconica. London : L. Reeve & Co. Vol. 3.
- Hedley, C. 1906. Studies on Australian Mollusca. Part IX. Proceedings of the Linnean Society of New South Wales 30: 520-546
- Allan, J.K. 1950. Australian shells: with related animals living in the sea, in freshwater and on the land. Melbourne : Georgian House xix, 470 pp., 45 pls, 112 text figs.
- Thornley, G. 1952. A new Thais found on a log at Port Stephens. Proceedings of the Royal Zoological Society of New South Wales 1951-1952: 43-45
- Baker, J.T. & Sutherland, M.D. 1968. Pigments of marine animals. VIII Precursors of 6,6'-Dibromoindigotin (Tyrian Purple) from the mollusc Dicathais orbita Gmelin. Tetrahedron Letters 1: 43-46
- Phillips, B.F. 1969. The population ecology of the whelk Dicathais aegrota in Western Australia. Australian Journal of Marine and Freshwater Research 20: 225-265
- Miller M.; Batt G. Reef and Beach Life of New Zealand, William Collins (New Zealand) Ltd, Auckland, New Zealand 1973
- Powell, A. W. B., New Zealand Mollusca, William Collins Publishers Ltd, Auckland, New Zealand 1979 ISBN 0-00-216906-1
- Ludbrook, N.H. 1978. Quaternary molluscs of the western part of the Eucla Basin. Bulletin of the Geological Survey of Western Australia 125: 1–286
- Pownall, Glen New Zealand Shells and Shellfish, Seven Seas Publishing Pty, Wellington, New Zealand 1979 ISBN 085467-054-8
- Wilson, B. 1994. Australian marine shells. Prosobranch gastropods. Kallaroo, WA : Odyssey Publishing Vol. 2 370 pp.
- Tan, K.S. 2003. Phylogenetic analysis and taxonomy of some southern Australian and New Zealand Muricidae (Mollusca: Neogastropoda). Journal of Natural History 37: 911-1028
