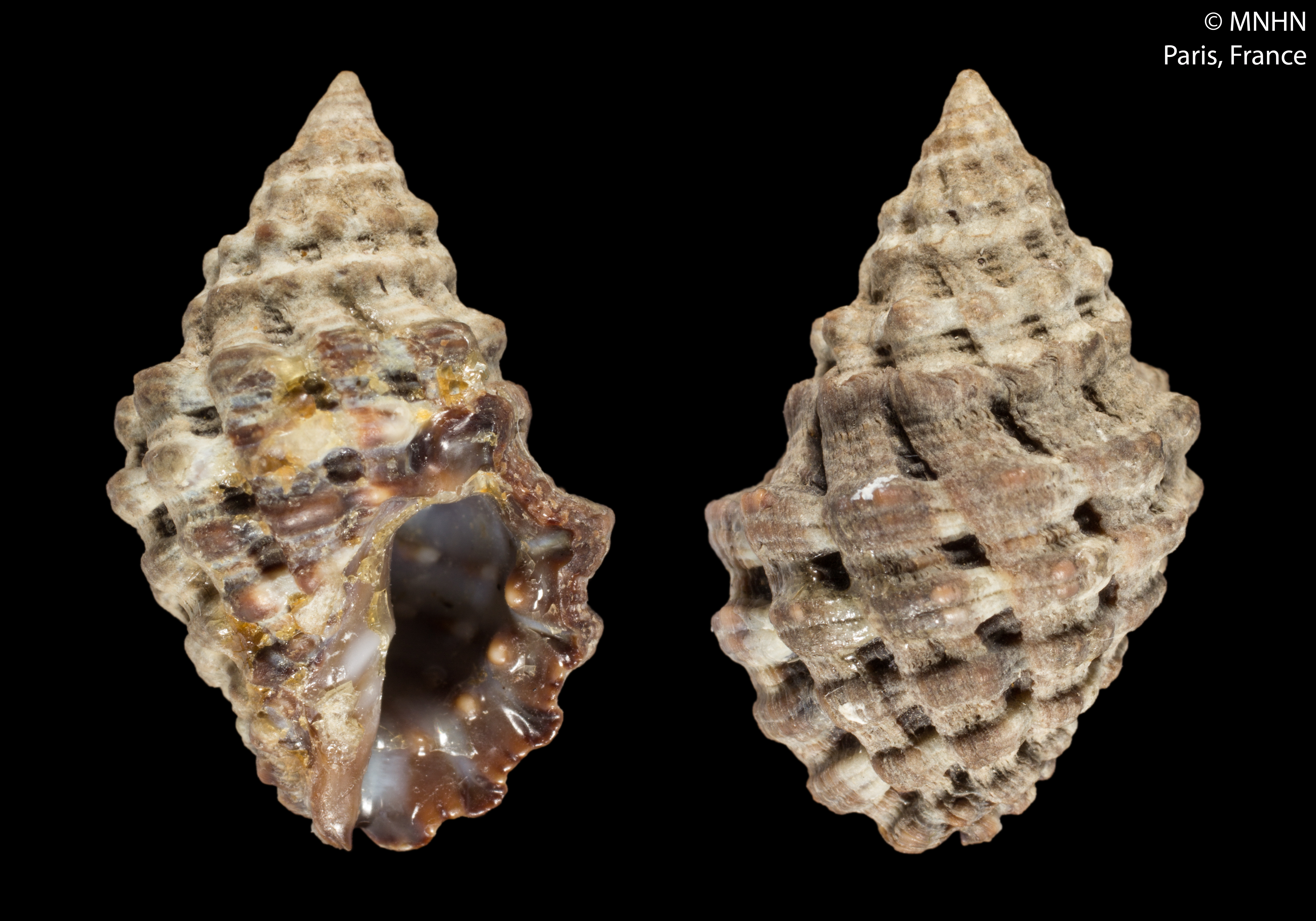

Scientific classification
- Kingdom: Animalia
- Phylum: Mollusca
- Class: Gastropoda
- Subclass: Caenogastropoda
- Order: Neogastropoda
- Family: Muricidae
- Genus: Neothais
- Species: N. marginatra

Binomial name
- Neothais marginatra (Blainville, 1832)

Synonyms
- Cronia marginatra (Blainville, 1832); Drupa marginatra (Blainville, 1832); Ergalatax foliacea Conrad, 1837; Morula marginatra (Blainville, 1832); Morula (Morula) fusca (Küster, 1862); Murex brunneolabrum Dall, 1923; Purpura cancellata Kiener, 1836; Purpura infumata Hombron & Jacquinot, 1854; Purpura marginatra Blainville, 1832; Purpura (Sistrum) fusco-nigra Dunker, 1871; Ricinula fusca Küster, 1862; Sistrum affine Pease, 1862; Sistrum indigoferum Melvill, 1901; Sistrum marginatrum (Blainville, 1832)

= Neothais marginatra =

Species of gastropod

Neothais marginatra, common name : the brownish drupe, is a species of sea snail, a marine gastropod mollusk in the family Muricidae, the murex snails or rock snails.

== Description ==
The shell size varies between 20 mm and 45 mm.

== Distribution ==
This marine species occurs in the Indian Ocean off Aldabra, the Mascarene Basin, the coast of South Africa and Mozambique; in the Pacific Ocean off Hawaii, the Fiji Islands, Samoan Islands and Polynesia; off Australia (Northern Territory, Queensland, Western Australia).
