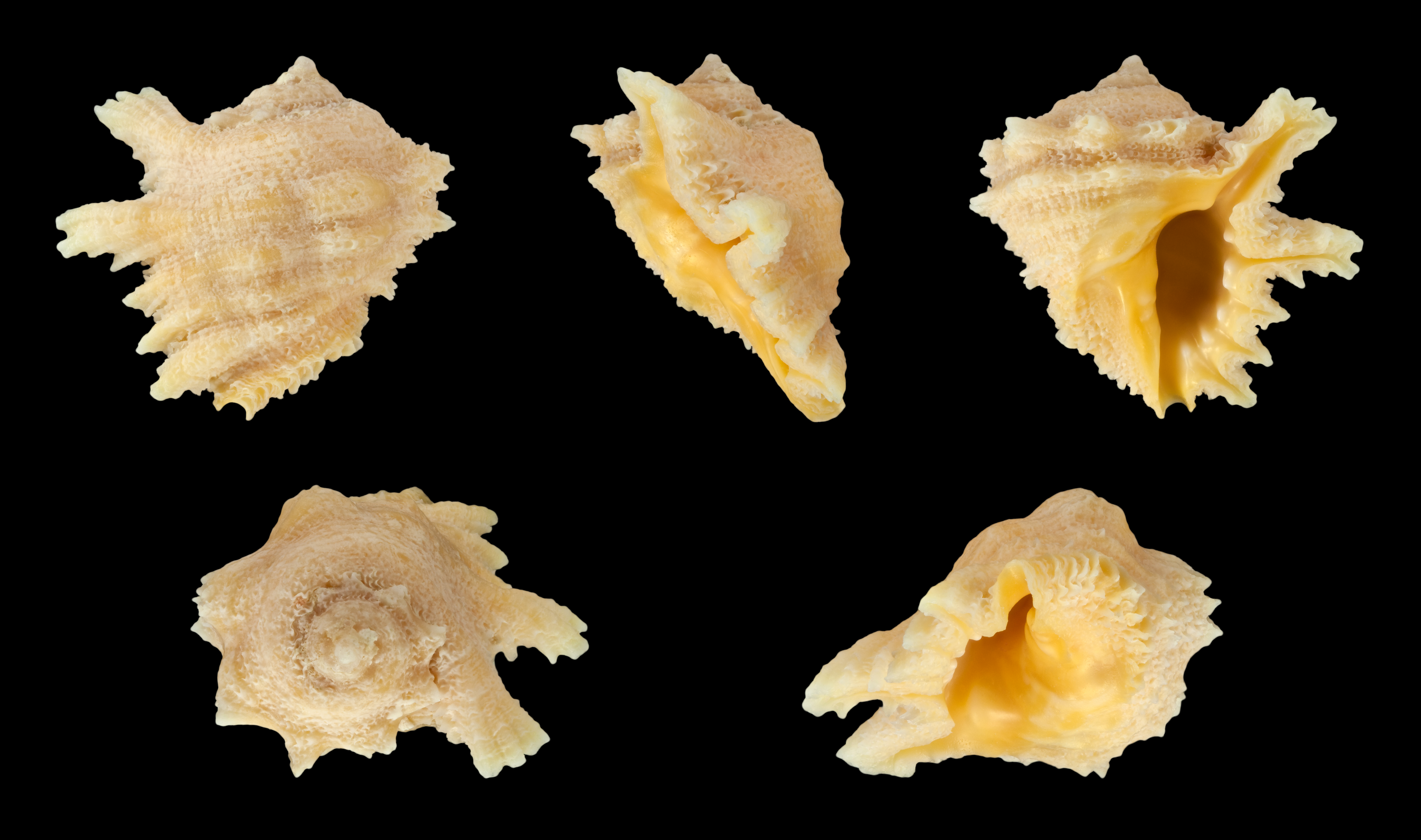
- A shell of Drupina grossularia

Scientific classification
- Kingdom: Animalia
- Phylum: Mollusca
- Class: Gastropoda
- Subclass: Caenogastropoda
- Order: Neogastropoda
- Family: Muricidae
- Genus: Drupina
- Species: D. grossularia

Binomial name
- Drupina grossularia Röding, 1798

Synonyms
- Drupa (Drupina) grossularia Röding, 1798; Drupa digitata (Lamarck, 1816); Drupa grossularia Röding, 1798; Murex fimbriatus Mawe, 1823; Purpura laurentiana Petit, 1850; Purpura monstruosa Lesson, 1842; Ricinella dactyloides Schumacher, 1817; Ricinula digitata Lamarck, 1816; Ricinula fusca sensu Sowerby Deshayes & Milne-Edwards, 1844

= Drupina grossularia =

Species of gastropod

Drupina grossularia, the finger drupe, is a species of sea snail, a marine gastropod mollusk in the family Muricidae, the murex snails or rock snails.

== Description ==
The shell size varies between 20 millimetres (0.79 in) and 45 millimetres (1.8 in). The shells of this species are yellow-mouthed and develop marginal lobate digitate processes. On the outer lip the teeth are singularly arranged. The radula has small and slender lateral teeth and a greatly modified rachidian radular tooth.

== Distribution and habitat ==
This species is distributed in the Eastern Indian Ocean along Madagascar in the Philippines and in Eastern Polynesia. It prefers hard reef in the surf zone and reef areas of lagoons. Also off Queensland, Australia, and off Guam.
