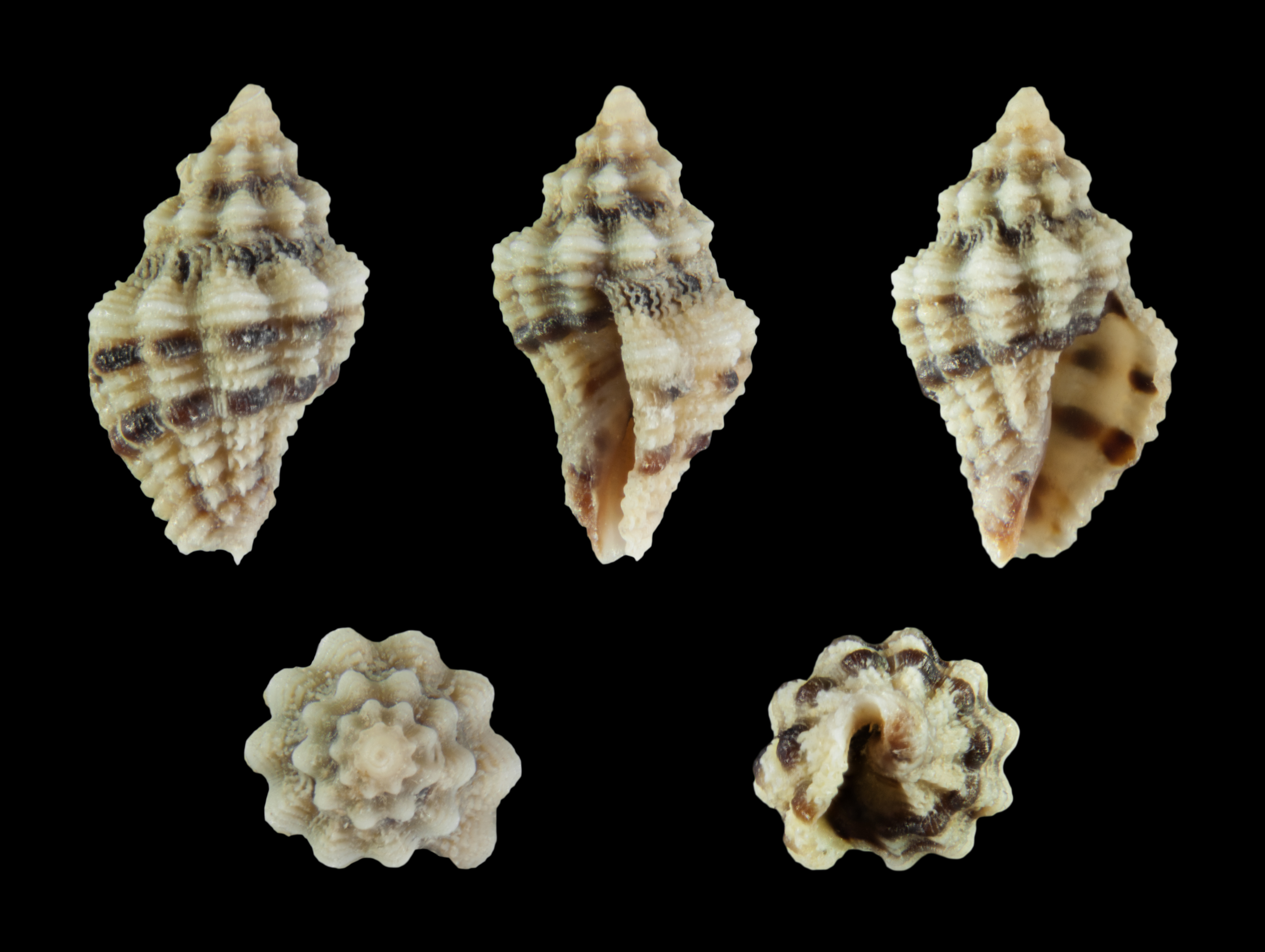
- juvenile
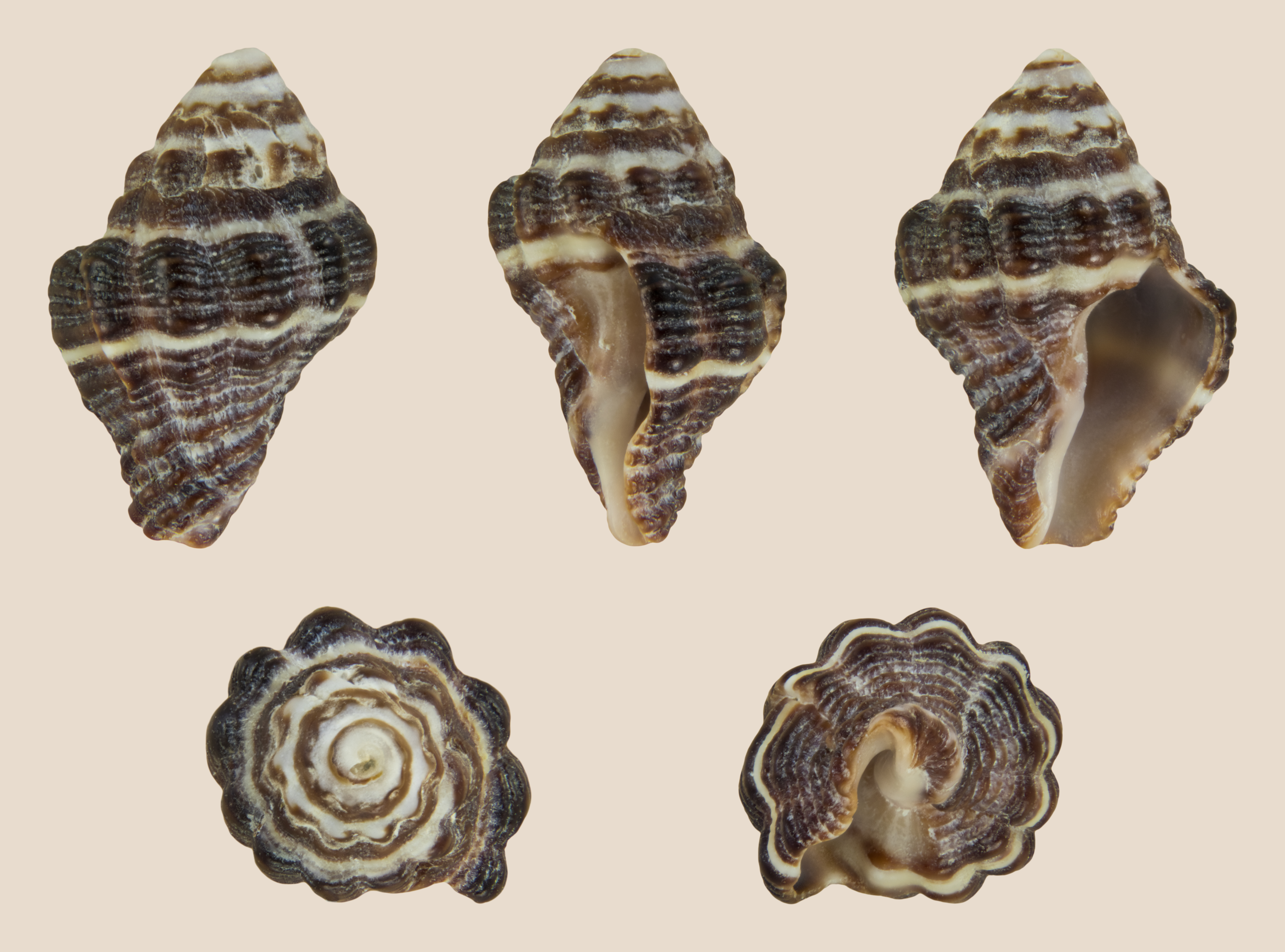

Scientific classification
- Kingdom: Animalia
- Phylum: Mollusca
- Class: Gastropoda
- Subclass: Caenogastropoda
- Order: Neogastropoda
- Superfamily: Muricoidea
- Family: Muricidae
- Subfamily: Ergalataxinae
- Genus: Drupella
- Species: D. margariticola

Binomial name
- Drupella margariticola (Broderip, 1833)

Synonyms
- Cronia margariticola (Broderip in Broderip & Sowerby, 1833); Drupa margariticola (Broderip in Broderip & Sowerby, 1833); Drupa undata (Dillwyn, 1817); Ergalatax margariticola (Broderip in Broderip & Sowerby, 1833); Morula margariticola (Broderip in Broderip & Sowerby, 1833); Murex margariticola Broderip in Broderip & Sowerby, 1833; Murex undatus Dillwyn, 1817; Murex undatus Chemnitz, 1795; Purpura lineolata Blainville, 1832; Purpura squamosa Deshayes, 1832; Purpura squamulosa Deshayes, 1844; Purpura violacea Lesson, 1842; Ricinula undata (Dillwyn, 1817); Sistrum indica G. Nevill & H. Nevill, 1875; Sistrum undatum (Dillwyn, 1817); Sistrum undatum var. kieneri Dautzenberg & H. Fischer, 1905; Thais margariticola (Broderip in Broderip & Sowerby, 1833)

= Drupella margariticola =

Species of gastropod

Drupella margariticola, common name the shouldered castor bean, is a species of sea snail, a marine gastropod mollusk, in the family Muricidae, the murex snails or rock snails.
