= Akiodoris lutescens =

Scientific classification
- Kingdom: Animalia
- Phylum: Mollusca
- Class: Gastropoda
- Order: Nudibranchia
- Family: Akiodorididae
- Genus: Akiodoris
- Species: A. lutescens

Binomial name
- Akiodoris lutescens (Bergh, 1879)

Species of gastropod

Akiodoris lutescens is a species of sea slug, a dorid nudibranch, a shell-less marine gastropod mollusc in the family Onchidorididae.

== Distribution ==
This species was described from a specimen collected by William Healey Dall in Nazan Bay at Atka Island, Aleutian Islands. It has been redescribed from specimens collected in the Sea of Okhotsk and the Commander Islands, Russia.
