= Akiodoris salacia =

Scientific classification
- Kingdom: Animalia
- Phylum: Mollusca
- Class: Gastropoda
- Order: Nudibranchia
- Family: Akiodorididae
- Genus: Akiodoris
- Species: A. salacia

Binomial name
- Akiodoris salacia Millen in Millen & Martynov, 2005

Species of gastropod

Akiodoris salacia is a species of sea slug, a dorid nudibranch, a shell-less marine gastropod mollusc in the family Onchidorididae.

== Distribution ==
This species was described from 3 specimens collected at Tyee Point, Copper Cove, British Columbia 49°22′08″N 123°16′05″W.
