= Doridunculus unicus =

Scientific classification
- Kingdom: Animalia
- Phylum: Mollusca
- Class: Gastropoda
- Order: Nudibranchia
- Family: Akiodorididae
- Genus: Doridunculus
- Species: D. unicus

Binomial name
- Doridunculus unicus Martynov & Roginskaya, 2005

Species of nudibranch

Doridunculus unicus is a species of sea slug, a dorid nudibranch, a shell-less marine gastropod mollusc in the family Onchidorididae.

== Discovery ==
Doridunculus unicus was first discovered in deep-sea basin of the Sea of Japan (depth 3000-3620 m). The absence of notal crests, asymmetricalnotal lobes, and characteristics of the radula anatomy distinguish Doridunculus unicus from the two other known specimens of the species. The peculiar feeding ecology of the new species was re-discovered. D. unicus feeds on the hydroids Egmundella sp. (Campanulinidae) and dwells in large aggregations of their colonies (numerous broken fragments of Egmundella sp. were found in the oesophagus, stomach and intestine of the new species).

Unicus (Latin) refers to three distinct characteristics: the history of discovery and description, asymmetrical notal lobes, and living with and feeding on hydroid.
