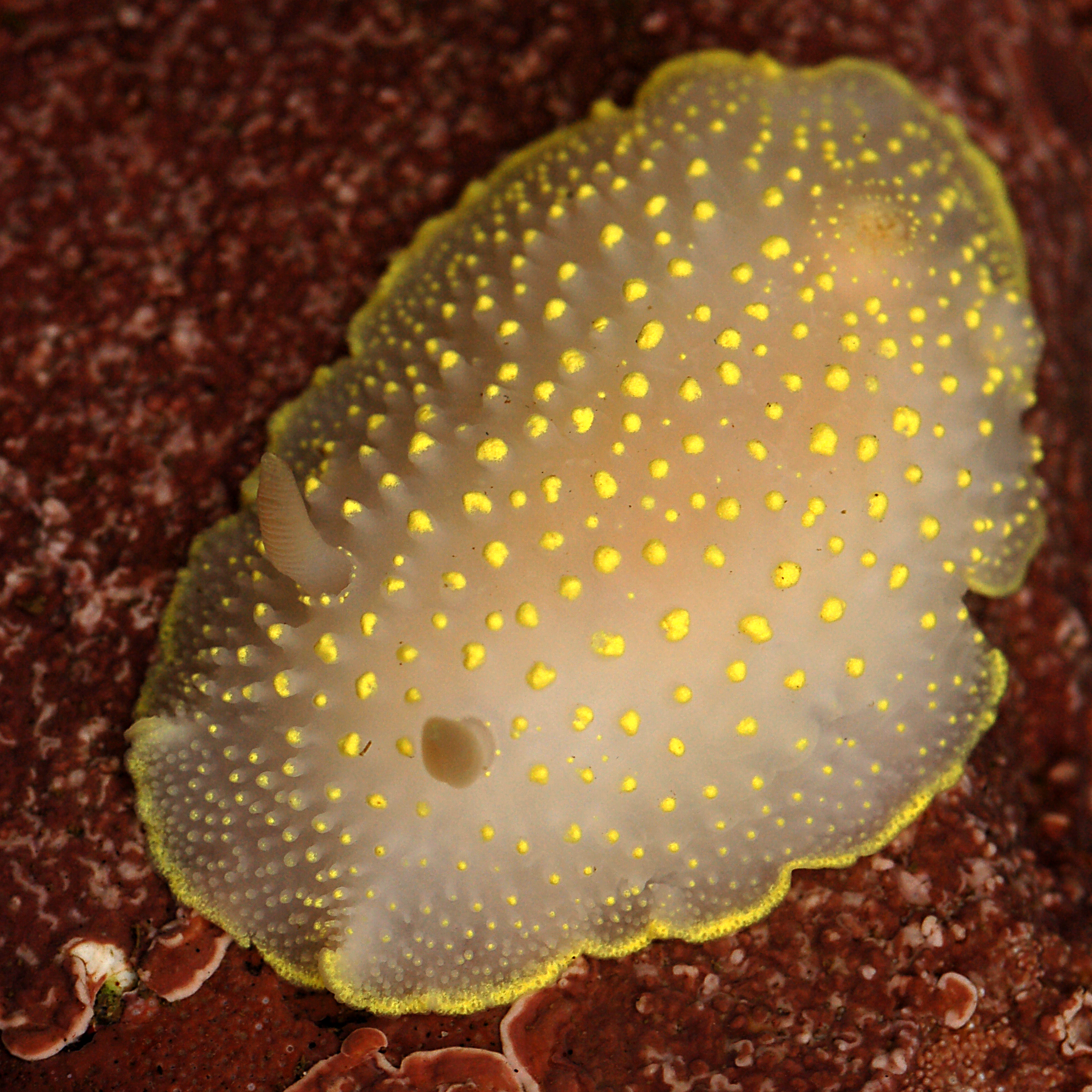
- Yellow-edge cadlina, Cadlina luteomarginata

Scientific classification
- Kingdom: Animalia
- Phylum: Mollusca
- Class: Gastropoda
- Order: Nudibranchia
- Suborder: Doridina; Tardy, 1970

Synonyms
- Anthobranchia; Euctenidiacea; Holohepatica

= Doridina =

Dorid nudibranchs

Suborder of gastropods

The Doridina, common name dorid nudibranchs, are a taxonomic suborder of sea snails or slugs, marine gastropod molluscs in the order Nudibranchia. Bouchet & Rocroi (2005) rejected the name Anthobranchia on the grounds that it also included Onchidium at the time of original publication. Doridina is equivalent and used in the latest classification.

A morphological phylogenetic study, published in 2000, by Wägele & Willan showed that the subclade Gnathodoridacea (= Bathydoridoidea) and the subclade Doridacea (= Phanerobranchia + Cryptobranchia + Porostomata) each form a monophyletic group.

In a later study, published in 2002, A. Valdés concluded that the superfamilies Doridoidea and Phyllidioidea (called by him Cryptobranchia + Porostomata) formed a clade. He expanded the usage of Cryptobranchia to encompass the whole subclade Doridacea. This move was not followed in the taxonomy of Bouchet and Rocroi.

== Taxonomy ==
This list follows the taxonomy presented in Bouchet et al. (2017):

=== Infraorder Bathydoridoidei ===
- Superfamily Bathydoridoidea
  - Family Bathydorididae

=== Infraorder Doridoidei ===
- Superfamily Doridoidea
  - Family Dorididae
  - Family Discodorididae
- Superfamily Polyceroidea
  - Family Polyceridae
  - Family Okadaiidae
- Superfamily Chromodoridoidea
  - Family Chromodorididae
  - Family Actinocyclidae
  - Family Hexabranchidae
  - Family Cadlinidae
- Superfamily Onchidoridoidea
  - Family Onchidorididae
  - Family Aegiridae
  - Family Akiodorididae
  - Family Calycidorididae
  - Family Corambidae
  - Family Goniodorididae
- Superfamily Phyllidioidea
  - Family Phyllidiidae
  - Family Dendrodorididae
  - Family Mandeliidae
