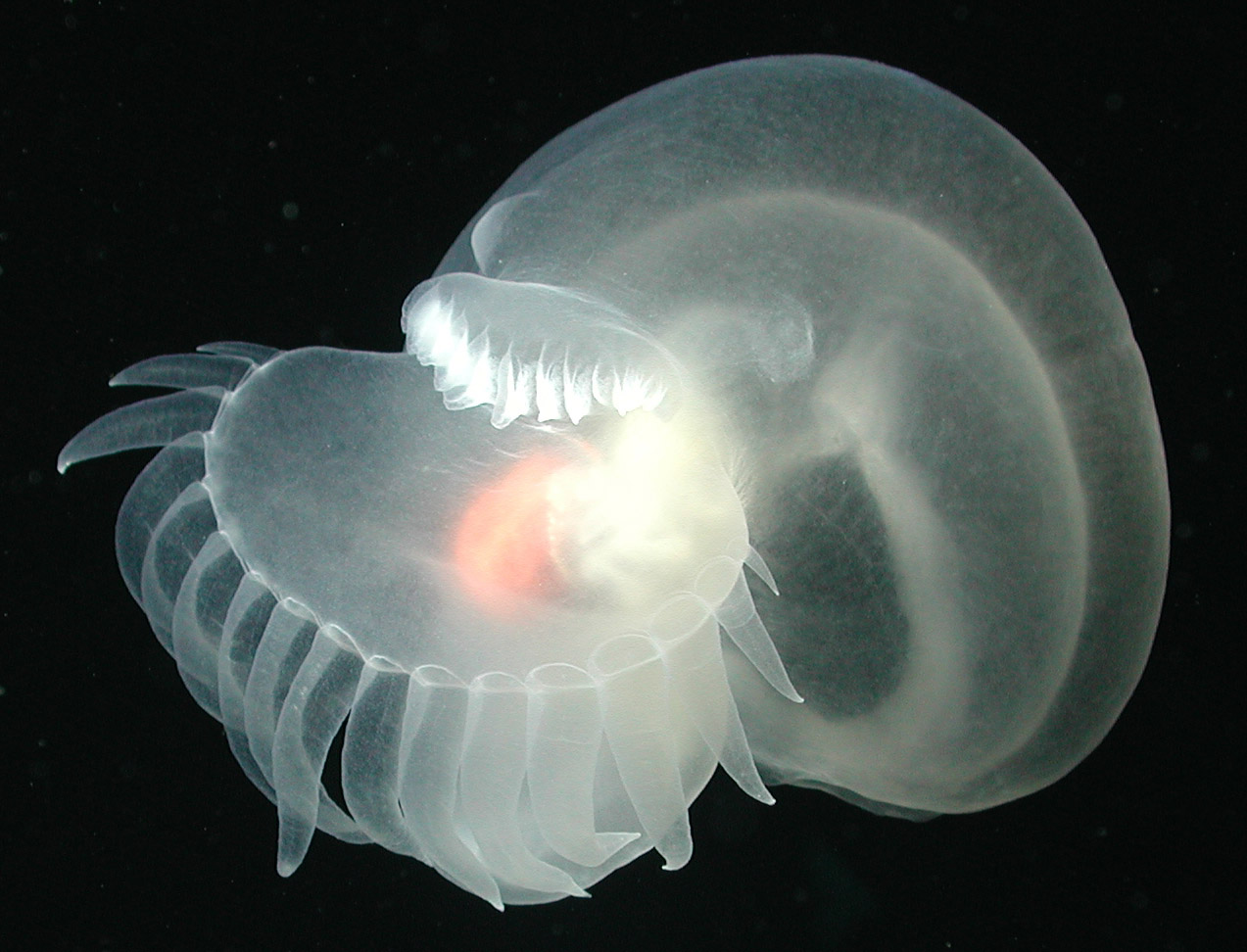
- A Bathydevius photographed in 2002 near Davidson Seamount. The tail is facing towards the camera and the hood behind

Scientific classification
- Kingdom: Animalia
- Phylum: Mollusca
- Class: Gastropoda
- Order: Nudibranchia
- Family: Bathydeviidae; Robison & Haddock, 2024
- Genus: Bathydevius; Robison & Haddock, 2024
- Species: B. caudactylus

Binomial name
- Bathydevius caudactylus Robison & Haddock, 2024

= Bathydevius =

Genus of nudibranch

Bathydevius (from Ancient Greek βαθύς (bathús), meaning "deep", and Latin dēvius, meaning "out of the way") is a monotypic genus of unusual, highly distinctive nudibranch (sea slug) native to deep waters of the North Pacific Ocean. It contains a single species, B. caudactylus ("finger tail"), and is the only known member of the monotypic family Bathydeviidae.

== Taxonomy ==
Bathydevius is a bizarre nudibranch with a highly unusual appearance, ecology, and taxonomy. It is the first known nudibranch to inhabit the bathypelagic zone, and only one of very few pelagic, free-swimming genera within this generally benthic group. It has a large, bell-shaped oral hood that it can use to catch prey, superficially similar to that of a Venus flytrap and closely resembling that of the nudibranch Melibe. However, phylogenetic studies indicate that Bathydevius is not closely related to Melibe, and is rather either (based on rRNA) the most basal nudibranch genus or (based on mtDNA) the sister genus to the Bathydorididae.

== Distribution ==
A majority of observations of Bathydevius are off the coast of California from the Monterey Canyon, but individuals have also been observed near Davidson Seamount, off the coast of Point Conception, and off the coast of Oregon. In addition, two individuals of a similar nudibranch were observed near the Mariana Trench, which would potentially extend the range of this genus or its relatives to the western Pacific.

== Description ==
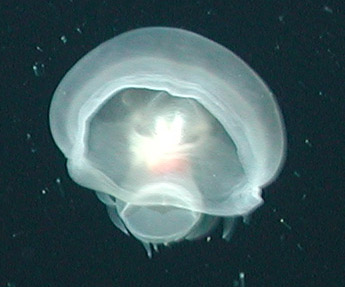
Bathydevius from the front, with its hood expanded

Bathydevius ranges between 56 millimetres (2.2 in) to 145 millimetres (5.7 in) in size, and when fully expanded, its hood has a diameter of 89 millimetres (3.5 in). The flexible hood can be shaped into a variety of configurations, to the extent that the highly prehensile margin of the hood can form notches. This hood is used to catch planktonic prey such as the shrimp Boreomysis. Its tail has finger-like protrusions, hence the specific epithet caudactylus.

It is bioluminescent, having the ability to scintillate blue across the surface of the oral hood and the protrusions on its tail, and is only the third known nudibranch lineage to display bioluminescence, which appears to have been independently evolved in each.

Bathydevius appears to neither sink nor rise when suspended in water, suggesting that it has a density roughly equivalent to that of seawater.

== Life history ==
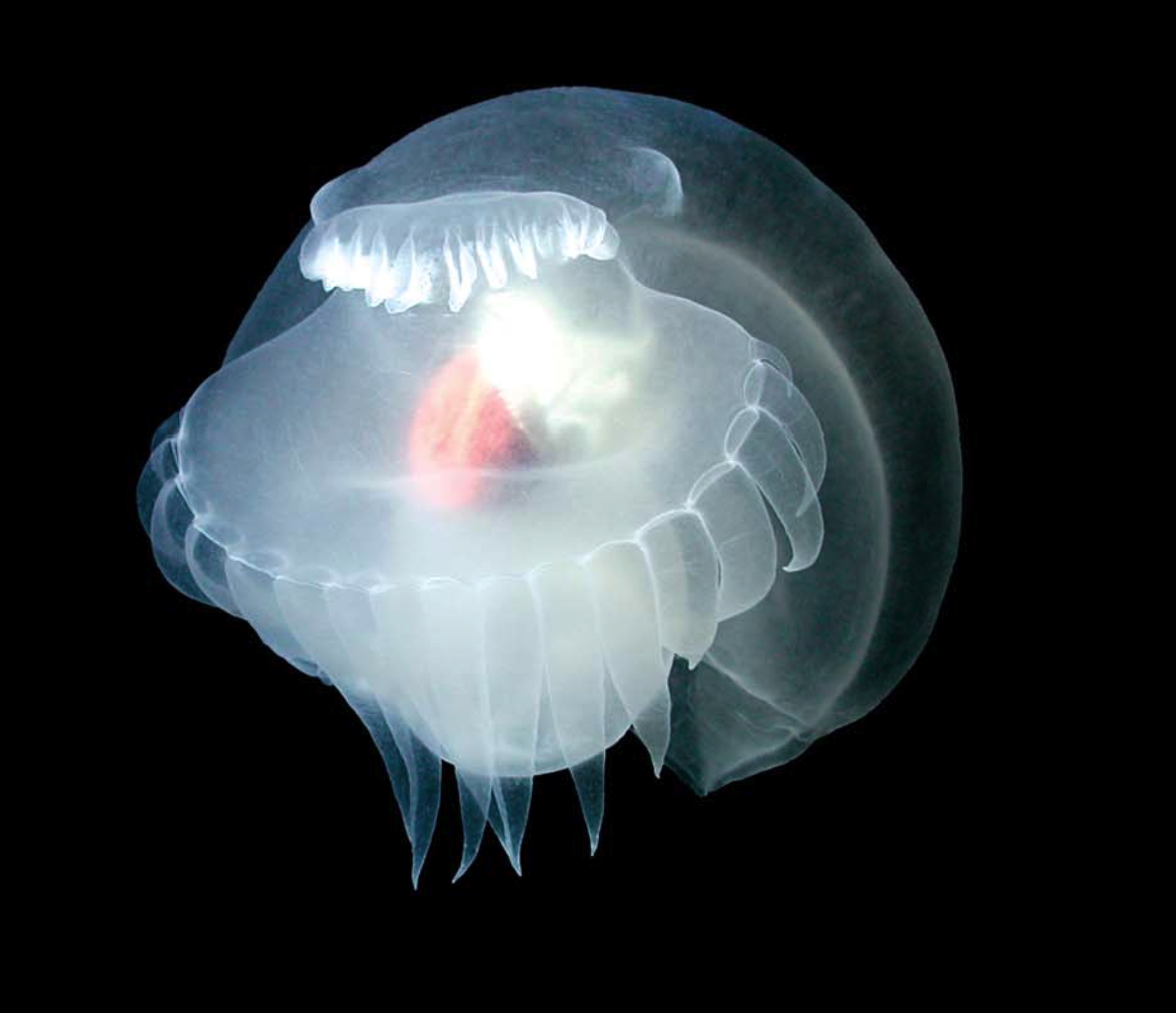
The finger-like tail of Bathydevius, seen from the back

Although Bathydevius generally swims in midwater, it descends and attaches to the seafloor when ready to breed. When attached, it releases a ribbon of eggs. At least 20 individuals have been observed attached to the seafloor. As with most other gastropods, it is hermaphroditic.

== Discovery ==
Bathydevius was first discovered in February 2000 by the Monterey Bay Aquarium Research Institute using the ROV Tiburon, at a depth of 2,614 metres (8,576 ft) in Monterey Bay, California. The holotype specimen was collected in January 2004, and over 157 individuals were documented in dives spanning from 2000 to 2021; during this period of study, it came to be nicknamed the "mystery mollusk" until its taxonomic identity was determined. Following extensive documentation of its taxonomy, ecology, and life history, it was finally described in November 2024.

At least one spawning Bathydevius individual has survived being captured alive and brought to the surface. It spawned within an aquarium tank and released an egg ribbon that attached to the bottom of the tank, which successfully developed into larvae.
