= Doridunculus =

Scientific classification
- Kingdom: Animalia
- Phylum: Mollusca
- Class: Gastropoda
- Order: Nudibranchia
- Family: Akiodorididae
- Genus: Doridunculus; G.O. Sars, 1878

Diversity
- 2 species

Genus of gastropods

Doridunculus is a genus of sea slugs, dorid nudibranchs, shell-less marine gastropod mollusks in the family Akiodorididae.

== Species ==
- Doridunculus echinulatus Sars G. O., 1878
- Doridunculus unicus Martynov & Roginskaya, 2005
