= Akiodoris =

Scientific classification
- Kingdom: Animalia
- Phylum: Mollusca
- Class: Gastropoda
- Order: Nudibranchia
- Family: Akiodorididae
- Genus: Akiodoris; Bergh, 1879

Diversity
- 2 species (in this list)

Genus of gastropods

Akiodoris is a genus of sea slugs, dorid nudibranchs, shell-less marine gastropod mollusks in the family Akiodorididae.

== Species ==
- Akiodoris lutescens Bergh, 1879
- Akiodoris salacia Millen, in Millen & Martynov, 2005
