= Armodoris =

Scientific classification
- Domain: Eukaryota
- Kingdom: Animalia
- Phylum: Mollusca
- Class: Gastropoda
- Order: Nudibranchia
- Superfamily: Onchidoridoidea
- Family: Akiodorididae
- Genus: Armodoris; Minichev, 1972

Diversity
- 2 species (in this list)

Genus of gastropods

Armodoris is a genus of sea slugs, dorid nudibranchs, shell-less marine gastropod mollusks in the family Akiodorididae.

== Species ==
- Armodoris antarctica Minichev, 1972
- Armodoris anudeorum Valdés, Moran & Woods, 2011
