= Prodoridunculus =

Scientific classification
- Kingdom: Animalia
- Phylum: Mollusca
- Class: Gastropoda
- Order: Nudibranchia
- Family: Akiodorididae
- Genus: Prodoridunculus; Valdés & Bouchet, 1998

Diversity
- 1 species

Genus of gastropods

Prodoridunculus is a genus of sea slugs, dorid nudibranchs, shell-less marine gastropod mollusks in the family Akiodorididae. It's only species, P. gaussianus, is found in Antarctica.

== Species ==
- Prodoridunculus gaussianus Thiele, 1912
