= Echinocorambe =

Scientific classification
- Kingdom: Animalia
- Phylum: Mollusca
- Class: Gastropoda
- Order: Nudibranchia
- Family: Akiodorididae
- Genus: Echinocorambe; Valdés & Bouchet, 1998

Diversity
- 1 species

Genus of gastropods

Echinocorambe is a genus of sea slugs, dorid nudibranchs, shell-less marine gastropod mollusks in the family Akiodorididae.

== Species ==
- Echinocorambe brattegardi Valdés & Bouchet, 1998
