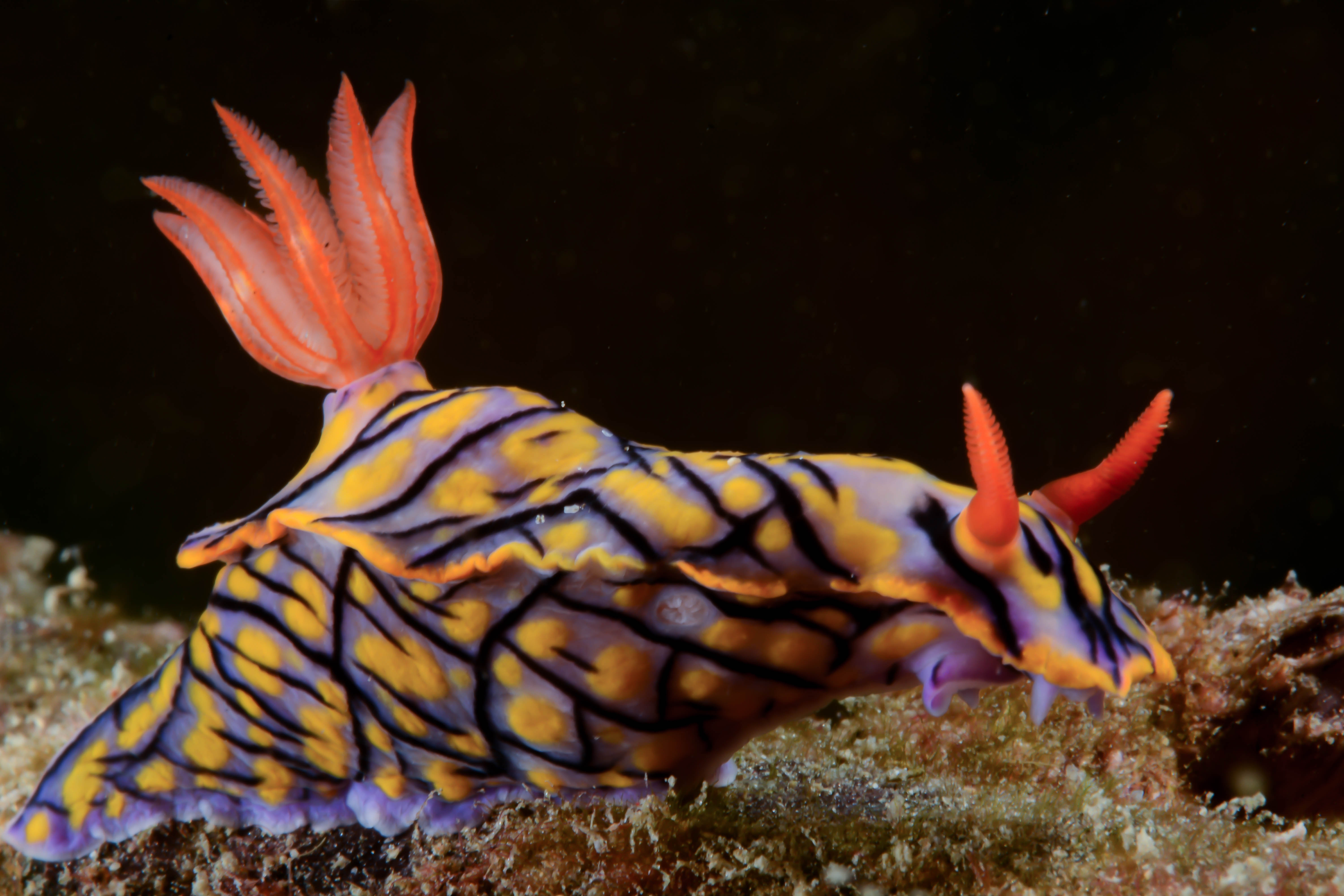

Scientific classification
- Kingdom: Animalia
- Phylum: Mollusca
- Class: Gastropoda
- Order: Nudibranchia
- Family: Chromodorididae
- Genus: Hypselodoris
- Species: H. nigrostriata

Binomial name
- Hypselodoris nigrostriata (Eliot, 1904)

Synonyms
- Chromodoris nigrostriata Eliot, 1904 (basionym)

= Hypselodoris nigrostriata =

Species of gastropod

Hypselodoris nigrostriata is a species of sea slug or dorid nudibranch, a marine gastropod mollusk in the family Chromodorididae.

== Distribution ==
This nudibranch is found in the Western Indian Ocean, from Tanzania to the Red Sea.

== Description ==
Hypselodoris nigrostriata has a yellow body with black striated lines running all over the body and upper dorsum. The gills and rhinophores are orange-red. This species can reach a total length of at least 40 mm and feeds on blue sponges from the genus Dysidea. It has a similar colour pattern to Hypselodoris zephyra from the western Indo-Pacific Ocean.
