= Symposia and workshops on opisthobranchs =

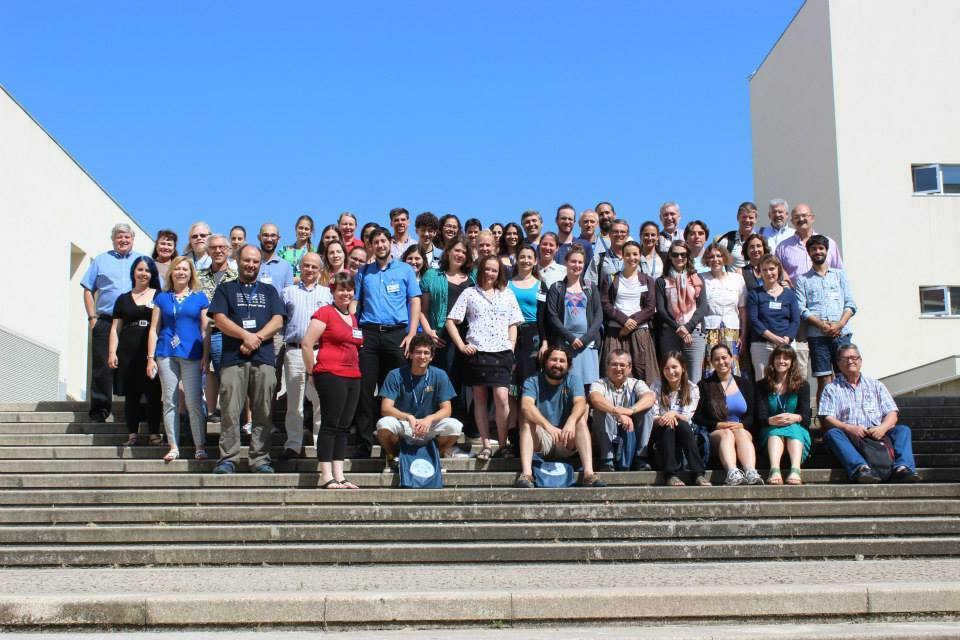
Attendees of the 5th International Workshop on Opisthobranchs, in Porto, 2015

Numerous biologists (malacologists) and citizen scientists, including many scuba divers, study the marine mollusks known as opisthobranchs, which are a large and diverse group of shelled and (mostly) shell-less, saltwater gastropods, the common name for which is sea slugs (including nudibranchs, sacoglossans, etc) and bubble snails. Symposia and workshops on opisthobranchs are meetings where those who specialize in studying these animals meet in order to share ideas, information, and knowledge.

== History ==
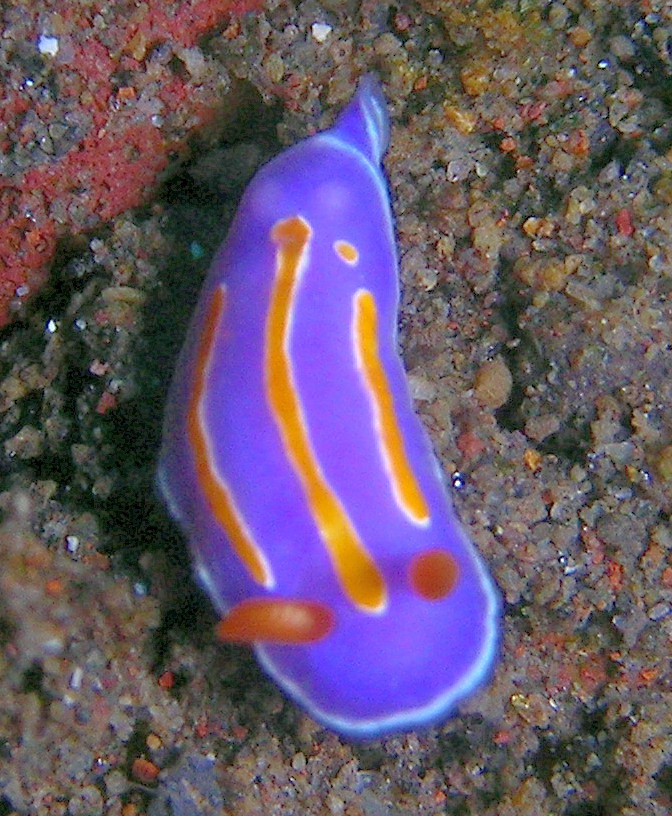
Pectenodoris trilineata, a nudibranch

Meetings of an informal group of opisthobranch scientists have occurred in the past. Numerous examples are listed on the Sea Slug Forum website.

A few are listed here:

- 1st International Workshop of Opisthobranchs, Menfi, Italy, 1999.
- 2nd International Workshop on Opisthobranchia, Bonn, Germany, 2006.
- 3rd International Workshop on Opisthobranchs, Vigo, Spain, 2010.
- 4th International Workshop on Opisthobranchs, Santa Cruz, USA, 24–27 June 2012
- 5th International Workshop on Opisthobranchs, Porto, Portugal, 2015

Planned workshop

- 6th International Workshop on Heterobranchs, Perth, Australia, 2018

Other meet-ups listed on Sea Slug Forum:

- 1st opisthobranch course in Venezuela, 2006
- Molluscan Forum, London, 2006
- Malacological conference in Ukraine, 2006
- Opisthobranch Symposium, Seattle, USA, 2006
- World Congress of Malacology, Perth, 2003
- Western Society of Malacologists Annual Meeting, 2003
- Announcing a course on Mollusca, 2002
- World Congress of Malacology, Perth, 2004
- WSM Opisthobranch Talks, July 2002
- Opisthobranch Symposium at WSM, June 2001

== A day to celebrate sea slugs ==
A concept which has been raised at these meetings is the idea of a calendar day on which to celebrate nudibranchs or sea slugs in general. In 2015, in Southern California, "Sea Slug Day" was October 29, "the birthday of Terry Gosliner from the San Francisco's California Academy of Sciences" (Gosliner is an expert on nudibranchs). Alternatively, "International Nudibranch Day" was suggested in Australia.
