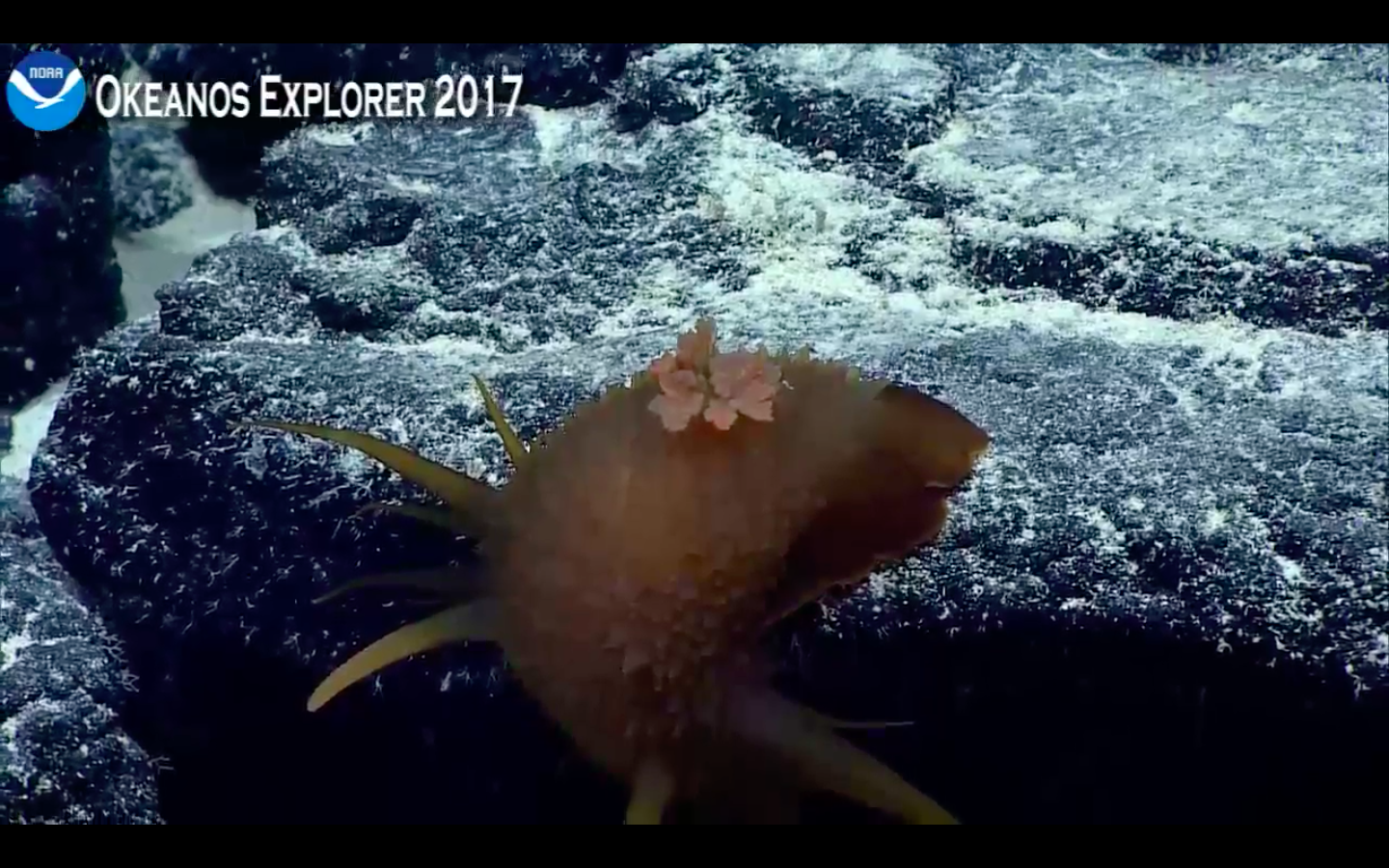
- A species of Bathydoris nudibranch

Scientific classification
- Kingdom: Animalia
- Phylum: Mollusca
- Class: Gastropoda
- Order: Nudibranchia
- Suborder: Doridina
- Infraorder: Bathydoridoidei; Minichev & Starobogatov, 1979
- Superfamily: Bathydoridoidea; Bergh, 1891
- Family: Bathydorididae; Bergh, 1891

Type genus
- Bathydoris Bergh, 1884

Genera
- See text

Synonyms
- Prodorididae Baranetz & Minichev, 1995

= Bathydorididae =

Family of gastropods

Bathydorididae is a taxonomic family of dorid nudibranch, shell-less marine gastropod mollusks. Bathydorididae is the only family in the superfamily Bathydoridoidea, within the infraorder Bathydoridoidei.

== Taxonomy ==
Genera in the family Bathydorididae include:

- Bathydoris Bergh, 1884 (type genus) (these nudibranchs live in deep water, below 1,500 m)
  - Bathydoris abyssorum Bergh, 1884 (type species)
  - Bathydoris aioca Er. Marcus & Ev. Marcus, 1962
  - Bathydoris antoni Ekimova, Á. Valdés, Stanovova, Mikhlina, Antokhina, Neretina, Chichvarkhina & Schepetov, 2021
  - Bathydoris hodgsoni Eliot, 1907
  - Bathydoris ingolfiana Bergh, 1899
  - Bathydoris japonensis Hamatani & Kubodera, 2010
  - Bathydoris spiralis Á. Valdés, 2002
- Prodoris Baranetz, 1997
  - Prodoris clavigera (Thiele, 1912)
