= Akiodorididae =

Scientific classification
- Kingdom: Animalia
- Phylum: Mollusca
- Class: Gastropoda
- Order: Nudibranchia
- Superfamily: Onchidoridoidea
- Family: Akiodorididae; Millen & Martynov, 2005

Genera
- See text

Family of gastropods

Akiodorididae are a taxonomic family of sea slugs, dorid nudibranchs, marine gastropod molluscs in the superfamily Onchidoridoidea.

== Genera ==
Genera in the family Akiodorididae include:

- Akiodoris Bergh, 1879
- Armodoris Minichev, 1972
- Doridunculus G. O. Sars, 1878
- Echinocorambe Valdés & Bouchet, 1998
- Prodoridunculus Thiele, 1912
