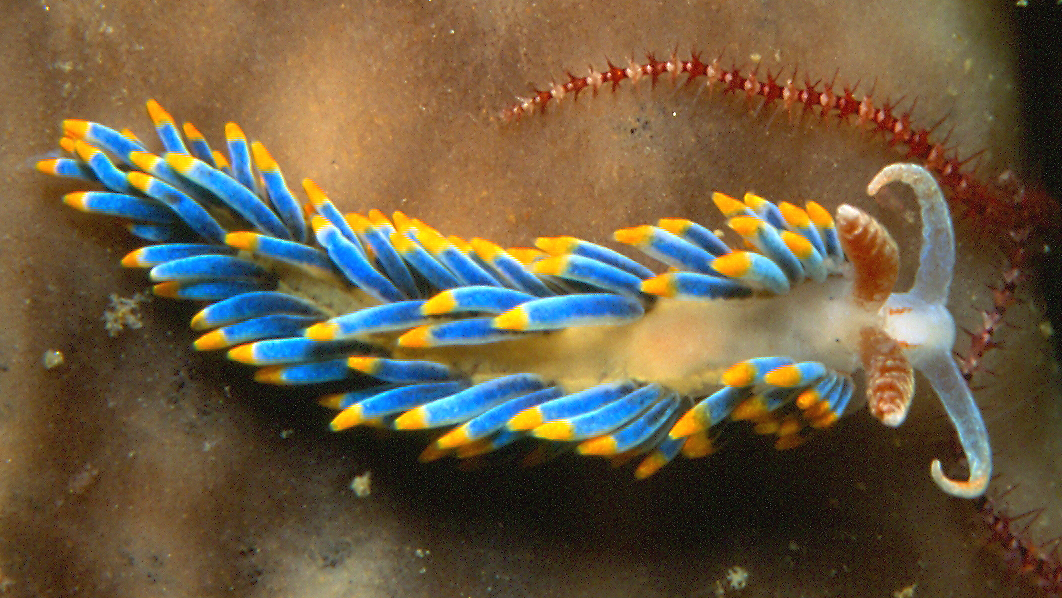
- Berghia coerulescens
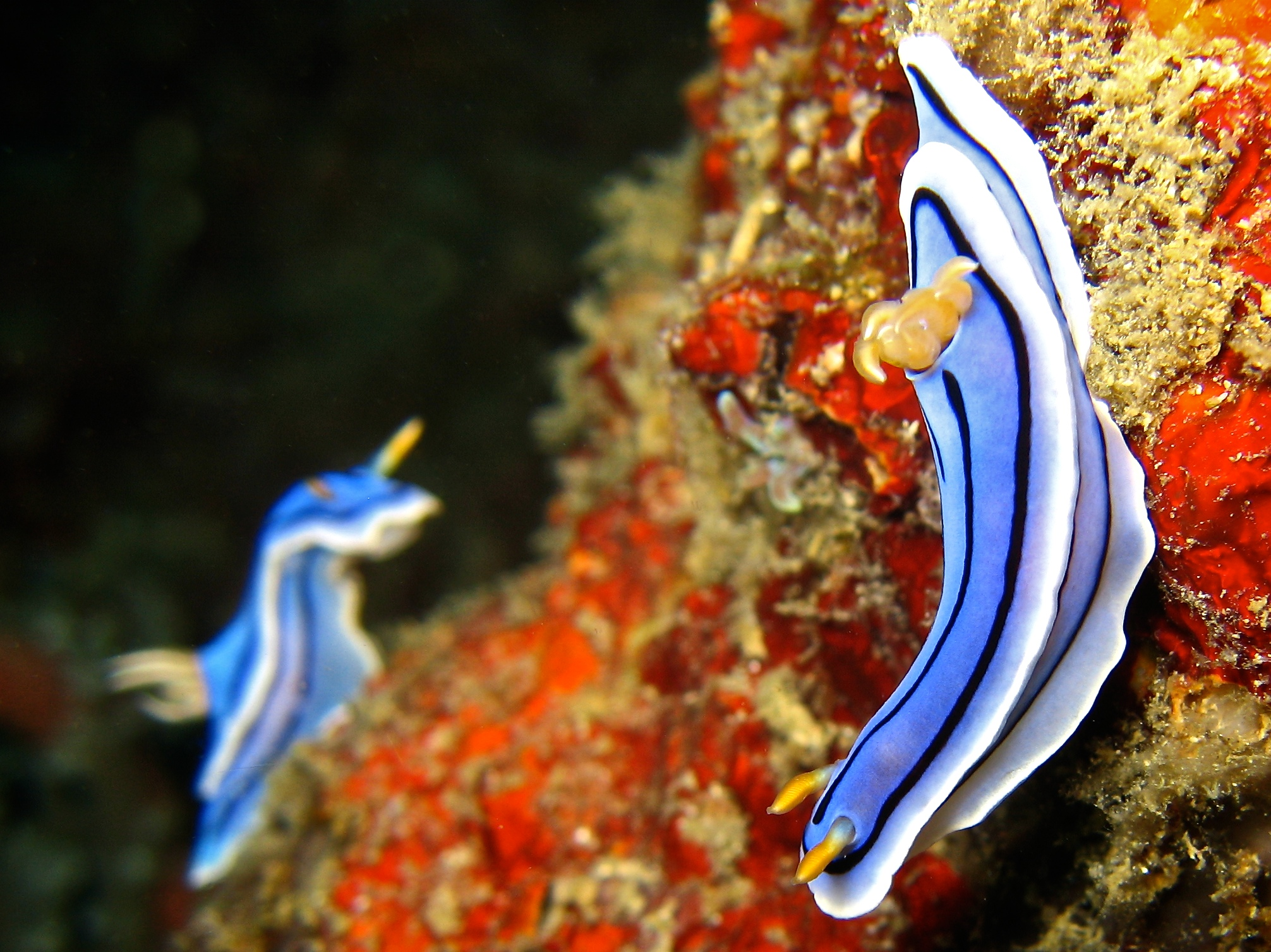
- Chromodoris lochi pair in Puerto Galera, the Philippines

Scientific classification
- Kingdom: Animalia
- Phylum: Mollusca
- Class: Gastropoda
- Subclass: Heterobranchia
- Infraclass: Euthyneura
- Subterclass: Ringipleura
- Superorder: Nudipleura
- Order: Nudibranchia; Cuvier, 1817

Clades
- Bathydeviidae; Euctenidiacea; Dexiarchia; See text for superfamilies

Diversity
- About 3000 species

= Nudibranch =

Order of gastropods

Nudibranchs (/ˈnjuːdɪbræŋk/) are a group of soft-bodied marine gastropod molluscs, belonging to the order Nudibranchia, that shed their shells after their larval stage. They are noted for their often extraordinary colours and striking forms, and they have been given colourful nicknames to match, such as "clown", "marigold", "splendid", "dancer", "dragon", and "sea rabbit". About 3,000 species of nudibranchs are known.

The word nudibranch comes from the Latin nudus 'naked' and the Ancient Greek βράγχια (bránkhia) 'gills'.

Nudibranchs are often casually called sea slugs, as they are a family of opisthobranchs (sea slugs), within the phylum Mollusca (molluscs), but many sea slugs belong to several taxonomic groups that are not closely related to nudibranchs. A number of these other sea slugs, such as the photosynthetic Sacoglossa and the colourful Aglajidae, are often confused with nudibranchs.

== Distribution and habitat ==
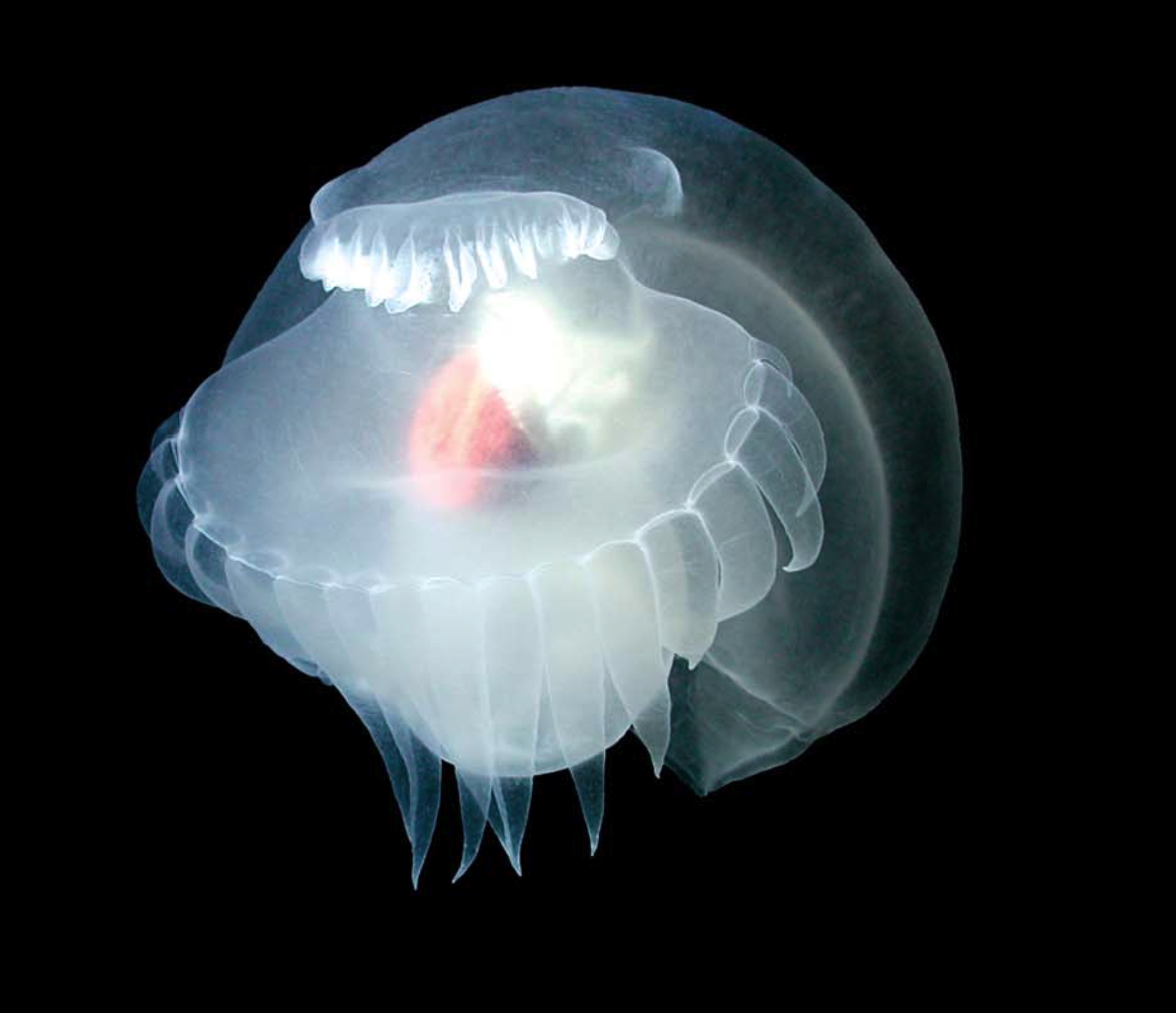
The unusual Bathydevius is the first known bathypelagic nudibranch

Nudibranchs occur in seas worldwide, ranging from the Arctic, through temperate and tropical regions, to the Southern Ocean around Antarctica. They are almost entirely restricted to salt water, although a few species are known to inhabit lower salinities in brackish water.

Nudibranchs live at virtually all depths, from the intertidal zone to depths well over 700 m (2,300 ft). The greatest diversity of nudibranchs is seen in warm, shallow reefs, although one nudibranch species was discovered at a depth near 2,500 m (8,200 ft). This nudibranch, described in 2024 as Bathydevius, is the only known nudibranch with a bathypelagic lifestyle and is one of the very few to be bioluminescent.

Nudibranchs are benthic animals, found crawling over the substrate. The only exceptions to this are the neustonic Glaucus nudibranchs, which float upside down just under the ocean's surface; the pelagic nudibranchs Cephalopyge trematoides, which swim in the water column; the two pelagic species of Phylliroe, and the evolutionarily distinct, bathypelagic Bathydevius.

== Anatomical description ==
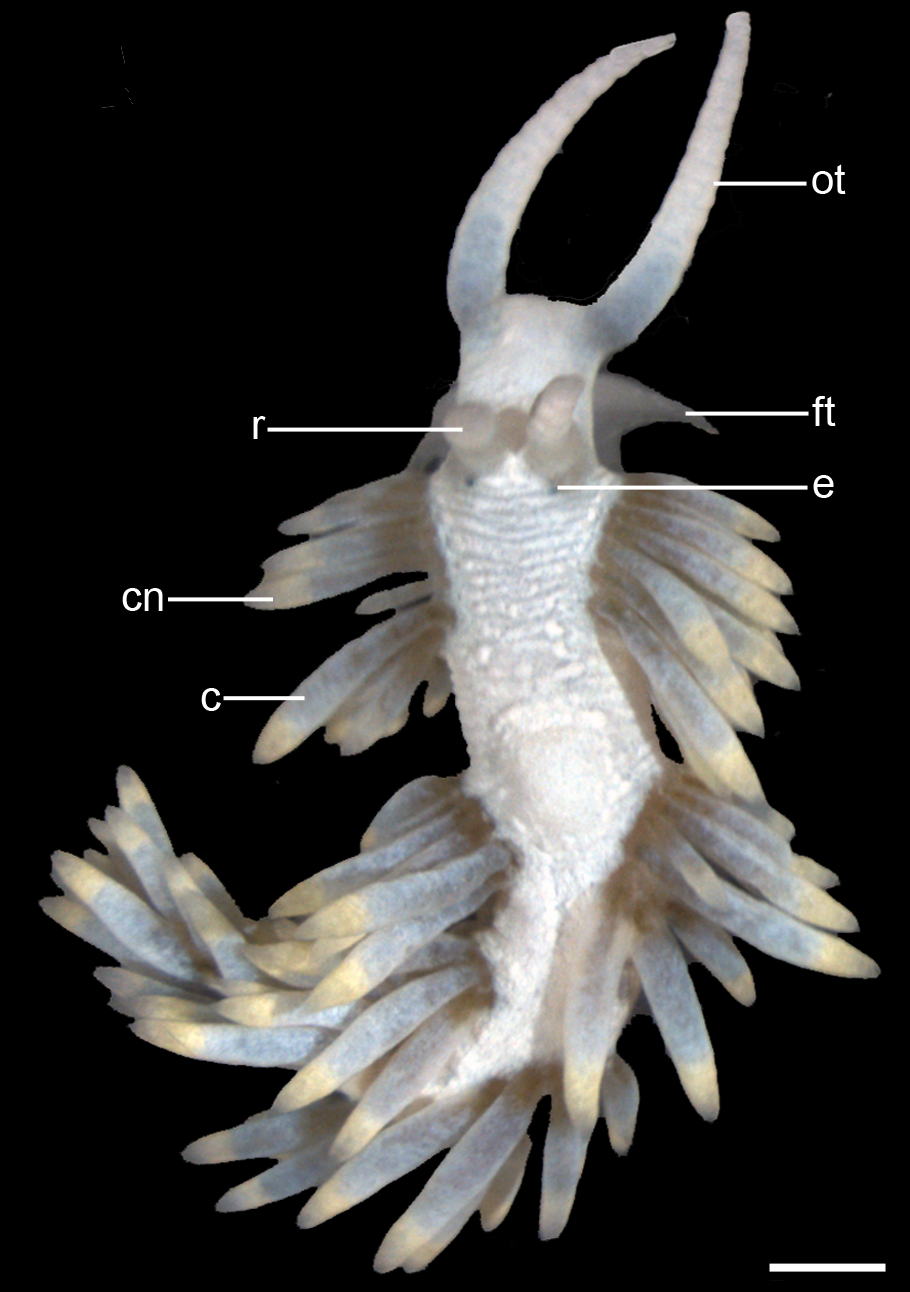
Berghia stephanieae nudibranch body: Note the oral tentacles (ot), foot tentacles (ft), eye (e), rhinophores (r), and cerata (c). This species has cnidosacs (cn) at the cerata tips. Scale bar is 100 μm.

The body forms of nudibranchs vary greatly. Because they are opisthobranchs, unlike most other gastropods, they are apparently bilaterally symmetrical externally (but not internally) because they have undergone secondary detorsion. In all nudibranchs, the male and female sexual openings are on the right side of the body, reflecting their asymmetrical origins. They lack a mantle cavity. Some species have venomous appendages (cerata) on their sides, which deter predators. Many also have a simple gut and a mouth with a radula.

The eyes in nudibranchs are simple and able to discern little more than light and dark. The eyes are set into the body, are about a quarter of a millimeter in diameter, and consist of a lens and five photoreceptors.

Nudibranchs vary in adult size from 4 to 600 mm (0.16 to 23.62 in).

The adult form is without a shell or operculum (in shelled gastropods, the operculum is a bony or horny plate that can cover the opening of the shell when the body is withdrawn). In most species, there is a swimming veliger larva with a coiled shell, but the shell is shed at metamorphosis when the larva transforms into the adult form. Some species have direct development, and the shell is shed before the animal emerges from the egg mass.

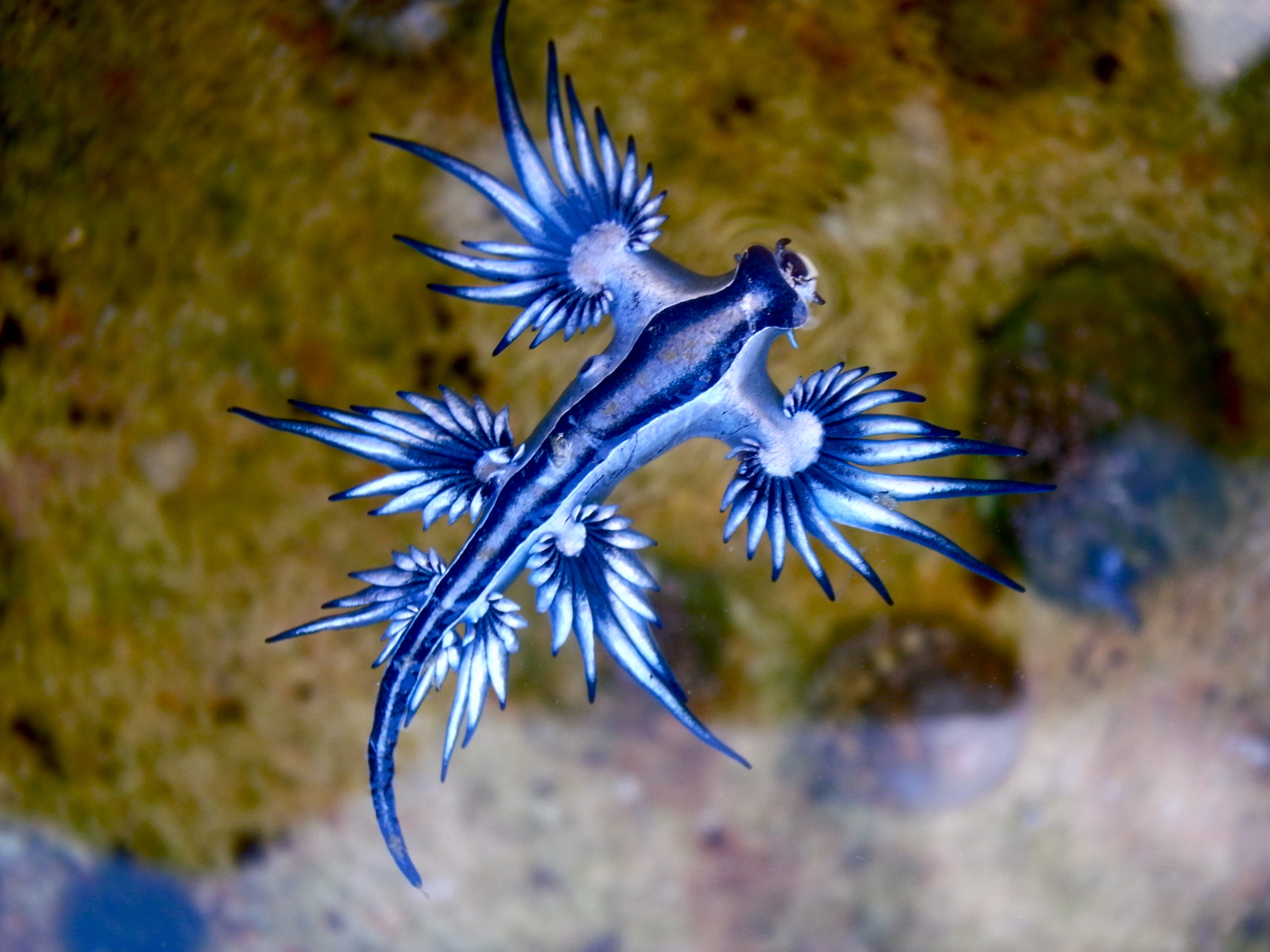
Glaucus atlanticus is an example of a nudibranch that has its cerata positioned like wings instead of on its back.

The name nudibranch is appropriate, since the dorids (infraclass Anthobranchia) breathe through a "naked gill" shaped into branchial plumes in a rosette on their backs. By contrast, on the back of the aeolids in the clade Cladobranchia, brightly coloured sets of protruding organs called cerata are present.

Nudibranchs have cephalic (head) tentacles, which are sensitive to touch, taste, and smell. Club-shaped rhinophores detect odors.

== Defence mechanisms ==
In the course of their evolution, nudibranchs have lost their shells, while developing alternative defence mechanisms. Some species evolved an external anatomy with textures and colours that mimicked surrounding sessile invertebrate animals (often their prey sponges or soft corals) to avoid predators with camouflage. Other nudibranchs, as seen especially well on Chromodoris quadricolor, have an intensely bright and contrasting colour pattern that makes them especially conspicuous in their surroundings. Nudibranch molluscs are the most commonly cited examples of aposematism in marine ecosystems, but the evidence for this has been contested, mostly because few examples of mimicry are seen among species, many species are nocturnal or cryptic, and bright colours at the red end of the spectrum are rapidly attenuated as a function of water depth. For example, the Spanish dancer nudibranch (genus Hexabranchus), among the largest of tropical marine slugs, potently chemically defended, and brilliantly red and white, is nocturnal and has no known mimics. Other studies of nudibranch molluscs have concluded they are aposematically coloured, for example, the slugs of the family Phylidiidae from Indo-Pacific coral reefs.

Some Nudibranchs that feed on hydrozoids can store the hydrozoids' nematocysts (stinging cells) in the dorsal body wall, the cerata. These stolen nematocysts, called kleptocnidae, wander through the alimentary tract without harming the nudibranch. Once further into the organ, the cells are assimilated by intestinal protuberances and brought to specific placements on the creature's hind body. The specific mechanism by which nudibranchs protect themselves from the hydrozoids and their nematocysts is yet unknown, but special cells with large vacuoles probably play an important role. Similarly, some nudibranchs can also take in plant cells (symbiotic algae from soft corals) and reuse these to make food for themselves. The related group of sacoglossan sea slugs feed on algae and retain just the chloroplasts for their own photosynthetic use, a process known as kleptoplasty. Some of these species have been observed practising autotomy, severing portions of their body to remove parasites, and have been observed to regrow their whole body from their head if decapitated.

Nudibranchs use a variety of chemical defences to aid in protection, but the strategy need not be lethal to be effective; in fact, good arguments exist that chemical defences should evolve to be distasteful rather than toxic. Some sponge-eating nudibranchs concentrate the chemical defences from their prey sponge in their bodies, rendering themselves distasteful to predators. One method of chemical defense used by nudibranchs are secondary metabolites, which play an important role in mediating relationships among marine communities. The evidence that suggests the chemical compounds used by dorid nudibranchs do in fact come from dietary sponges lies in the similarities between the metabolites of prey and nudibranchs, respectively. Furthermore, nudibranchs contain a mixture of sponge chemicals when they are in the presence of multiple food sources, as well as change defence chemicals with a concurrent change in diet. This, however, is not the only way for nudibranchs to develop chemical defences. Certain Antarctic marine species defense mechanisms are believed to be controlled by biological factors like predation, competition, and selective pressures. Certain species can produce their own chemicals de novo without dietary influence. Evidence for the different chemical production methods comes with the characteristic uniformity of chemical composition across drastically different environments and geographic locations found throughout de novo production species compared to the wide variety of dietary and environmentally dependent chemical composition in sequestering species.

Another protection method is releasing acid from the skin. Once the specimen is physically irritated or touched by another creature, it will release the mucus automatically, eating the animal from the inside out.

=== Apparent production of sound ===
In 1884, Philip Henry Gosse reported observations by "Professor Grant" (possibly Robert Edmond Grant) that two species of nudibranchs emit sounds that are audible to humans.

Two very elegant species of Sea-slug, viz., Eolis punctata [i.e. Facelina annulicornis], and Tritonia arborescens [i.e. Dendronotus frondosus], certainly produce audible sounds. Professor Grant, who first observed the interesting fact in some specimens of the latter, which he was keeping in an aquarium, says of the sounds that 'they resemble very much the clink of a steel wire on the side of the jar, one stroke only been given at a time, and repeated at intervals of a minute or two; when placed in a large basin of water, the sound is much obscured and is like that of a watch, one stroke being repeated, as before, at intervals. The sound is longest and most often repeated when the Tritonia are lively and moving about and is not heard when they are cold and without any motion; in the dark, I have not observed any light emitted at the time of the stroke; no globule of air escapes to the surface of the water, nor is any ripple produced on the surface at the instant of the stroke; the sound, when in a glass vessel, is mellow and distinct.' The Professor has kept these Tritonia alive in his room for a month. During the whole period of their confinement, they have continued to produce the sounds with very little diminution of their original intensity. In a small apartment, they are audible at a distance of twelve feet. The sounds obviously proceed from the mouth of the animal, and at the instant of the stroke, we observe the lips suddenly separate as if to allow the water to rush into a small vacuum formed within. As these animals are hermaphrodites, requiring mutual impregnation, the sounds may possibly be a means of communication between them, or, if they are of an electric nature, they may be the means of defending from foreign enemies, one of the most delicate, defenceless, and beautiful Gasteropods that inhabit the deep.

== Life cycle ==
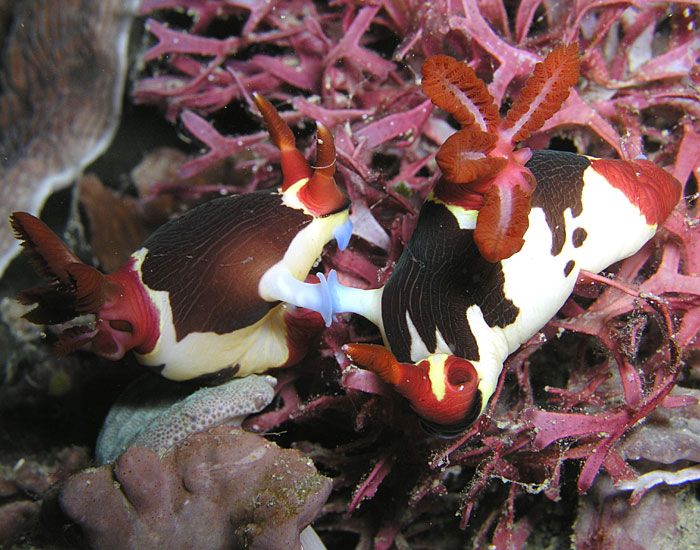
Mating behavior in Nembrotha chamberlaini

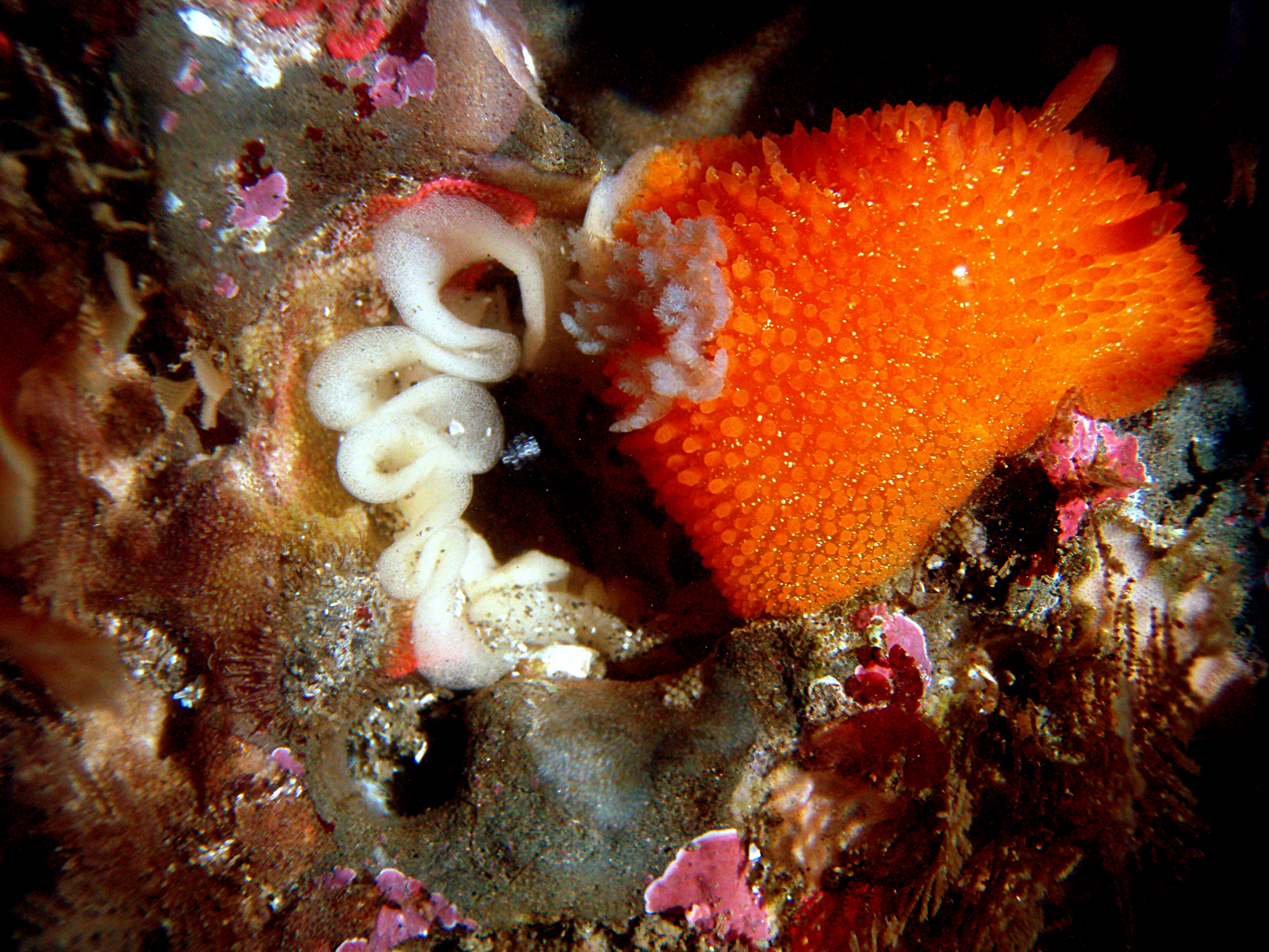
Acanthodoris lutea laying eggs

Nudibranchs are hermaphroditic, thus having a set of reproductive organs for both sexes, but they cannot fertilize themselves. Mating usually takes a few minutes and involves a dance-like courtship. Nudibranchs typically deposit their eggs within a gelatinous spiral, which is often described as looking like a ribbon. The number of eggs varies greatly; it can be as few as just 1 or 2 eggs (Vayssierea felis) or as many as several thousand. The eggs contain toxins from sea sponges as a means of deterring predators. The appearance and physiology of larvae after hatching differs between species; some resemble smaller versions of the adult with fewer cerata, while others hatch as planktonic veligers. The lifespan of nudibranchs can range from a few weeks to a year, depending on the species.

== Feeding and ecological role ==
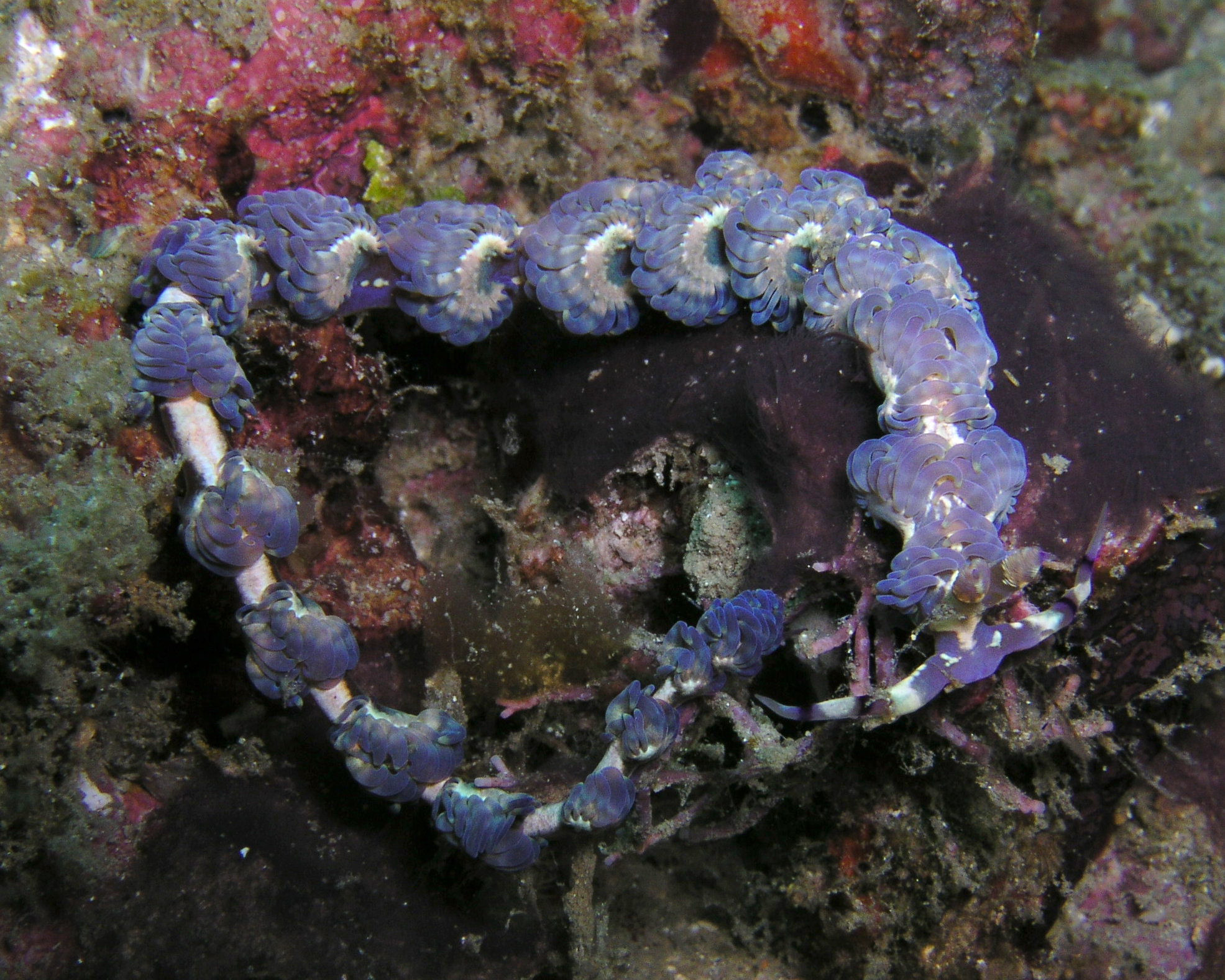
Pteraeolidia ianthina has adapted cerata to house symbiotic zooxanthellae obtained from its diet, which continue to photosynthesize and provide energy to the nudibranch.

Most known nudibranchs are carnivorous. Some feed on sponges, others on hydroids (e.g. Cuthona), others on bryozoans (phanerobranchs such as Tambja, Limacia, Plocamopherus and Triopha), and some eat other sea slugs or their eggs (e.g. Favorinus) or, on some occasions, are cannibals and prey on members of their own species. Other groups feed on tunicates (e.g. Nembrotha, Goniodoris), other nudibranchs (Roboastra, which are descended from tunicate-feeding species), barnacles (e.g. Onchidoris bilamellata), and anemones (e.g. the Aeolidiidae and other Cladobranchia). Some also eat algae (e.g. Costasiella kuroshimae)

The surface-dwelling nudibranch, Glaucus atlanticus, is a specialist predator of siphonophores, such as the Portuguese man o' war. This predatory mollusk sucks air into its stomach to keep it afloat, and using its muscular foot, it clings to the surface film. If it finds a small victim, Glaucus simply envelops it with its capacious mouth, but if the prey is a larger siphonophore, the mollusc nibbles off its fishing tentacles, the ones carrying the most potent nematocysts. Like some others of its kind, Glaucus does not digest the nematocysts; instead, it uses them to defend itself by passing them from its gut to the surface of its skin. Many of these larvae have not been put forth as only 36 species has been studied and only 23 in the lab. The ecology of nudibranchs' change with species.

== Taxonomy ==
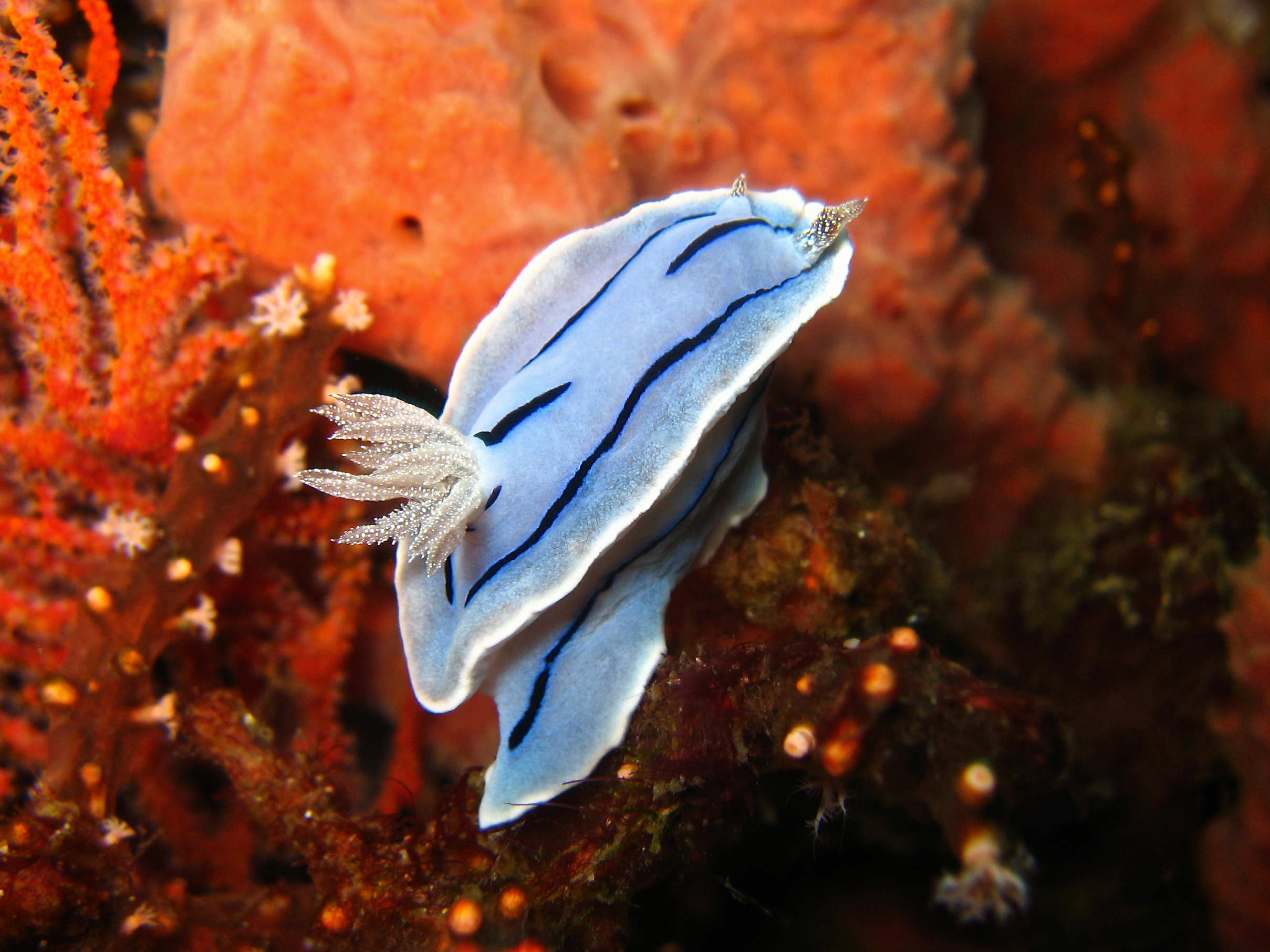
Dorids (Chromodoris willani shown) breathe with the branchial plume, which projects from around their anus.

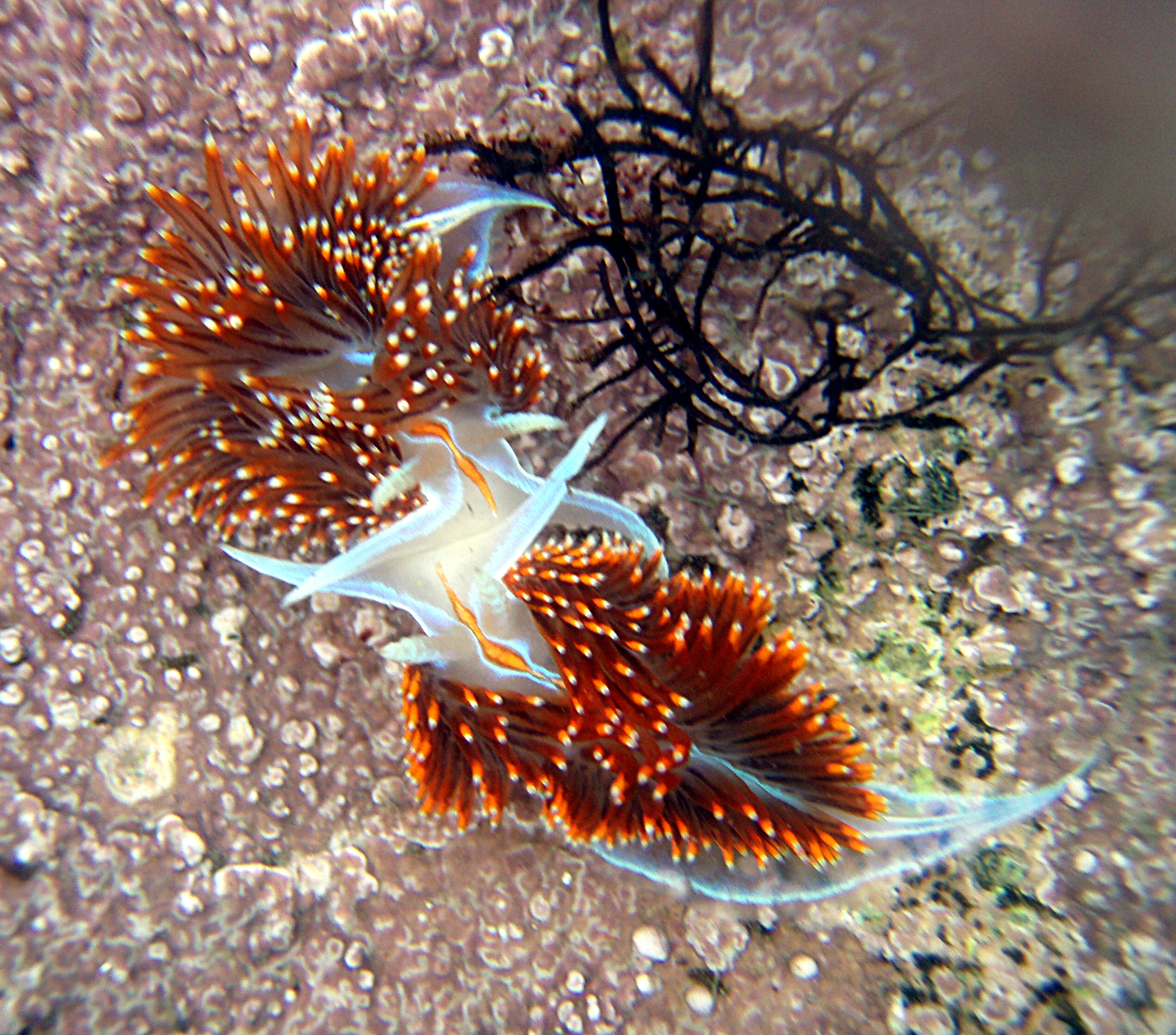
Aeolids (Hermissenda opalescens pictured) have many cerata over their back which are used for defense and respiration.

Nudibranchs are frequently differentiated as either dorid or aeolid.

Nudibranchs are commonly divided into two main kinds, dorid and aeolid (also spelled eolid) nudibranchs:

- Dorids (clade Anthobranchia, Doridacea, or Doridoidea) are recognised by having an intact digestive gland and the feather-like branchial (gill) plume, which forms a cluster on the posterior part of the body, around the anus. Fringes on the mantle do not contain any intestines. Additionally, dorid nudibranchs commonly have distinct pockets, bumps, and/or mantle dermal formations, which are distortions on their skin, used to store bioactive defense chemicals.
- Aeolids (clade Cladobranchia) have cerata (spread across the back) instead of the branchial plume. The cerata function in place of gills and facilitate gas exchange through the epidermis. Additionally, aeolids possess a branched digestive gland, which may extend into the cerate and often has tips that contain cnidosacs (stinging cells absorbed from prey species and then used by the nudibranch). They lack a mantle. Some are hosts to zooxanthellae.

The exact systematics of nudibranchs are a topic of recent revision. Traditionally, nudibranchs have been treated as the order Nudibranchia, located in the gastropod mollusc subclass Opisthobranchia (the marine slugs: which consisted of nudibranchs, sidegill slugs, bubble snails, algae sap-sucking sea slugs, and sea hares). Since 2005, pleurobranchs (which had previously been grouped among sidegill slugs) have been placed alongside nudibranchs in the clade Nudipleura (recognising them as more closely related to each other than to other opisthobranchs). Since 2010, Opisthobranchia has been recognised as not a valid clade (it is paraphyletic) and instead Nudipleura has been placed as the first offshoot of Euthyneura (which is the dominant clade of gastropods).

In 2024, a brand new family of deep-sea pelagic nudibranch, Bathydeviidae, was described as containing a single genus, Bathydevius. This family does not appear to be closely related to any other extant nudibranch and is the only known bathypelagic nudibranch taxon.

=== Traditional hierarchy ===
This classification was based on the work of Johannes Thiele (1931), built on the concepts of Henri Milne-Edwards (1848).

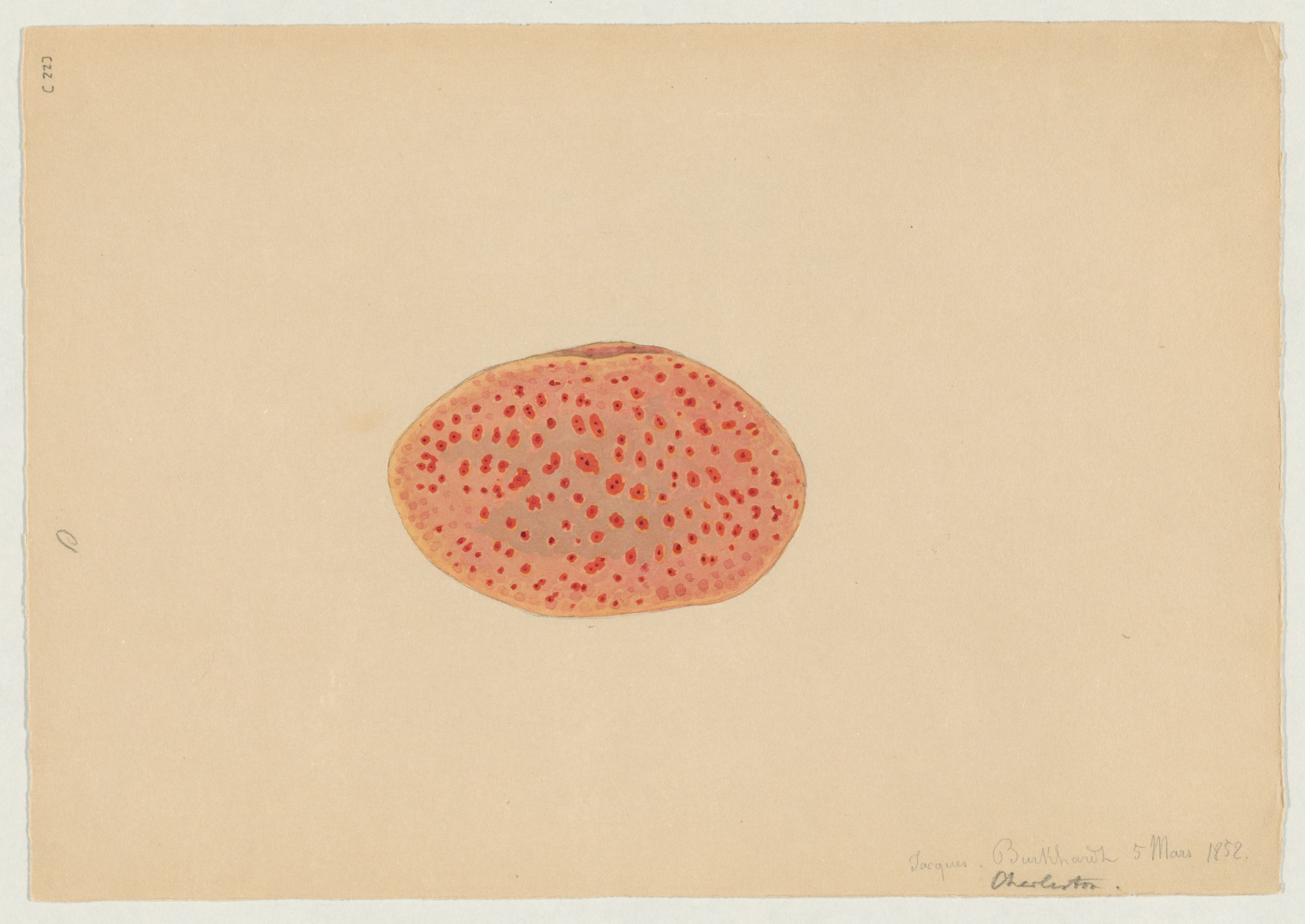
1852 watercolor of a Nudibranch by Jacques Burkhardt

Order Nudibranchia:

- Infraorder Anthobranchia Férussac, 1819 (dorids)
  - Superfamily Doridoidea Rafinesque, 1815
  - Superfamily Doridoxoidea Bergh, 1900
  - Superfamily Onchidoridoidea Alder & Hancock, 1845
  - Superfamily Polyceroidea Alder & Hancock, 1845
- Infraorder Cladobranchia Willan & Morton, 1984 (aeolids)
  - Superfamily Aeolidioidea J. E. Gray, 1827
  - Superfamily Arminoidea Rafinesque, 1814
  - Superfamily Dendronotoidea Allman, 1845
  - Superfamily Metarminoidea Odhner in Franc, 1968

=== Modern revisions ===
Newer insights derived from morphological data and gene-sequence research seemed to confirm those ideas. On the basis of investigation of 18S rDNA sequence data, strong evidence supports the monophyly of the Nudibranchia and its two major groups, the Anthobranchia/Doridoidea and Cladobranchia. A study published in May 2001, again revised the taxonomy of the Nudibranchia. They were thus divided into two major clades:

- Anthobranchia (= Bathydoridoidea + Doridoidea)
- Dexiarchia nom. nov. (= Doridoxoidea + Dendronotoidea + Aeolidoidea + "Arminoidea").

In the taxonomy of Bouchet & Rocroi (2005), Nudibranchia is established as a subclade sister to the subclade Pleurobranchomorpha (currently Pleurobranchida) within the clade Nudipleura. Under this taxonomy it was divided into the two main clades Euctenidiacea and Dexiarchia.

In 2017, Philippe Bouchet, Jean-Pierre Rocroi, Ellen E. Strong, and colleagues emended the rank of the Nudibranchia from clade to order and made significant changes to its taxonomy, among them the change of its main division into the two suborders Doridina and Cladobranchia.

Clade Nudibranchia, following Bouchet & Rocroi (2005)

- Clade Euctenidiacea (= Holohepatica)
  - Clade Gnathodoridacea
    - Superfamily Bathydoridoidea Bergh, 1891
  - Clade Doridacea
    - Superfamily Doridoidea Rafinesque, 1815
    - Superfamily Phyllidioidea Rafinesque, 1814 (= Porostomata; = Porodoridoidea)
    - Superfamily Onchidoridoidea Gray, 1827 (= Phanerobranchiata Suctoria)
    - Superfamily Polyceroidea Alder & Hancock, 1845 (= Phanerobranchiata Non Suctoria)
- Clade Dexiarchia (= Actenidiacea]
  - Clade Pseudoeuctenidiacea (= Doridoxida)
    - Superfamily Doridoxoidea Bergh, 1899
  - Clade Cladobranchia (= Cladohepatica)
    - Unassigned to Superfamily
    - Clade Euarminida
      - Superfamily Arminoidea Iredale & O’Donoghue, 1923 (1841)
    - Clade Dendronotida
      - Superfamily Tritonioidea Lamarck, 1809
    - Clade Aeolidida
      - Superfamily Flabellinoidea Bergh, 1889 (= Pleuroprocta)
      - Superfamily Fionoidea Gray, 1857 (= Acleioprocta)
      - Superfamily Aeolidioidea Gray, 1827 (= Cleioprocta)

Order Nudibranchia, following Bouchet et al. (2017)

- Suborder Doridina
  - Infraorder Bathydoridoidei
    - Superfamily Bathydoridoidea Bergh, 1891
  - Infraorder Doridoidei
    - Unassigned to Superfamily
    - Superfamily Doridoidea Rafinesque, 1815 (= Cryptobranchia; = Eudoridoidea; = Labiostomata)
    - Superfamily Polyceroidea Alder & Hancock, 1845
    - Superfamily Chromodoridoidea Bergh, 1891
    - Superfamily Onchidoridoidea Gray, 1827
    - Superfamily Phyllidioidea Rafinesque, 1814 (= Porostomata; = Porodoridoidea)
- Suborder Cladobranchia
  - Unassigned to Superfamily
  - Superfamily Arminoidea Iredale & O’Donoghue, 1923 (1841) (= Euarminida)
  - Superfamily Doridoxoidea Bergh, 1899 (= Pseudoeuctenidiacea)
  - Superfamily Proctonotoidea Gray, 1853
  - Superfamily Dendronotoidea Allman, 1845
  - Aeolid Superfamilies
    - Superfamily Flabellinoidea Bergh, 1889 (= Pleuroprocta)
    - Superfamily Fionoidea Gray, 1857 (= Acleioprocta)
    - Superfamily Aeolidioidea Gray, 1827 (= Cleioprocta)

In 2025, Korshunova and colleagues restricted Nudibranchia, coming to include only taxa traditionally placed under Cladobranchia, and reinstated Doridida as an order. The authors sustained this decision on the recurrent recovery of Doridida as a robustly supported monophyletic clade sister to remaining nudibranchs, and the distinguishable morphology and arrangement of dorid gills, these predominantly dorsal and modified into a circle, and homological to the lateral gill of the order Pleurobranchida. According to the same, these body plan differences were already recognized as significant enough criteria to separate both groups as different orders in their first introduction by Blainville in 1814 (with major representatives of non-dorid nudibranch diversity under "Pleurobranches" and dorids under "Cyclobranches"), and that in light of the amount of hidden and undescribed fine scale worldwide diversity there is notable importance in separating major differences in patterns of organization at higher taxonomic scales.

Under this study, various changes to the inner taxonomy of Nudibranchia were also made, with various subclades being revised, reinstated or newly established:

- Order Doridida Pelseneer, 1894
- Order Nudibranchia Cuvier in Blainville, 1814
  - Suborder Aeolidacea Odhner, 1934
    - Superfamily Aeolidioidea Gray, 1827
    - Superfamily Apataoidea Korshunova et al., 2017
    - Superfamily Cumanotoidea Odhner, 1907
    - Superfamily Chudoidea Korshunova, Fletcher & Martynov, 2025
    - Superfamily Embletonioidea Pruvot-Fol, 1954
    - Superfamily Fionoidea Gray, 1857
    - Superfamily Flabellinoidea Bergh, 1889
    - Superfamily Flabellinopsoidea Korshunova et al., 2017
    - Superfamily Notaeolidioidea Eliot, 1910
    - Superfamily Samloidea Korshunova et al., 2017
    - Superfamily Unidentioidea Millen and Hermosillo, 2012
    - Superfamily incertae sedis
      - Family Piseinotecidae Edmunds, 1970
  - Suborder Arminacea Odhner, 1934
    - Superfamily Arminoidea Iredale and O’Donoghue, 1923
    - Superfamily Doridoxoidea Bergh, 1899
  - Suborder Dendronotacea Odhner, 1934
    - Superfamily Dendronotoidea Allman, 1845
  - Suborder Janolacea Minichev and Starobogatov, 1979
    - Superfamily Proctonotoidea Gray, 1853
  - Suborder Tritoniacea Lamarck, 1809 sensu Minichev and Starobogatov, 1979
    - Superfamily Tritonioidea Lamarck, 1809
  - Suborder incertae sedis
    - Family Heroidae Gray, 1857
    - Genus Trivettea Bertsch, 2014
- Order incertae sedis
  - Genus Bathydevius Robison and Haddock, 2024

== Gallery ==
This gallery shows some of the great variability in the color and form of nudibranchs, and nudibranch egg ribbons.

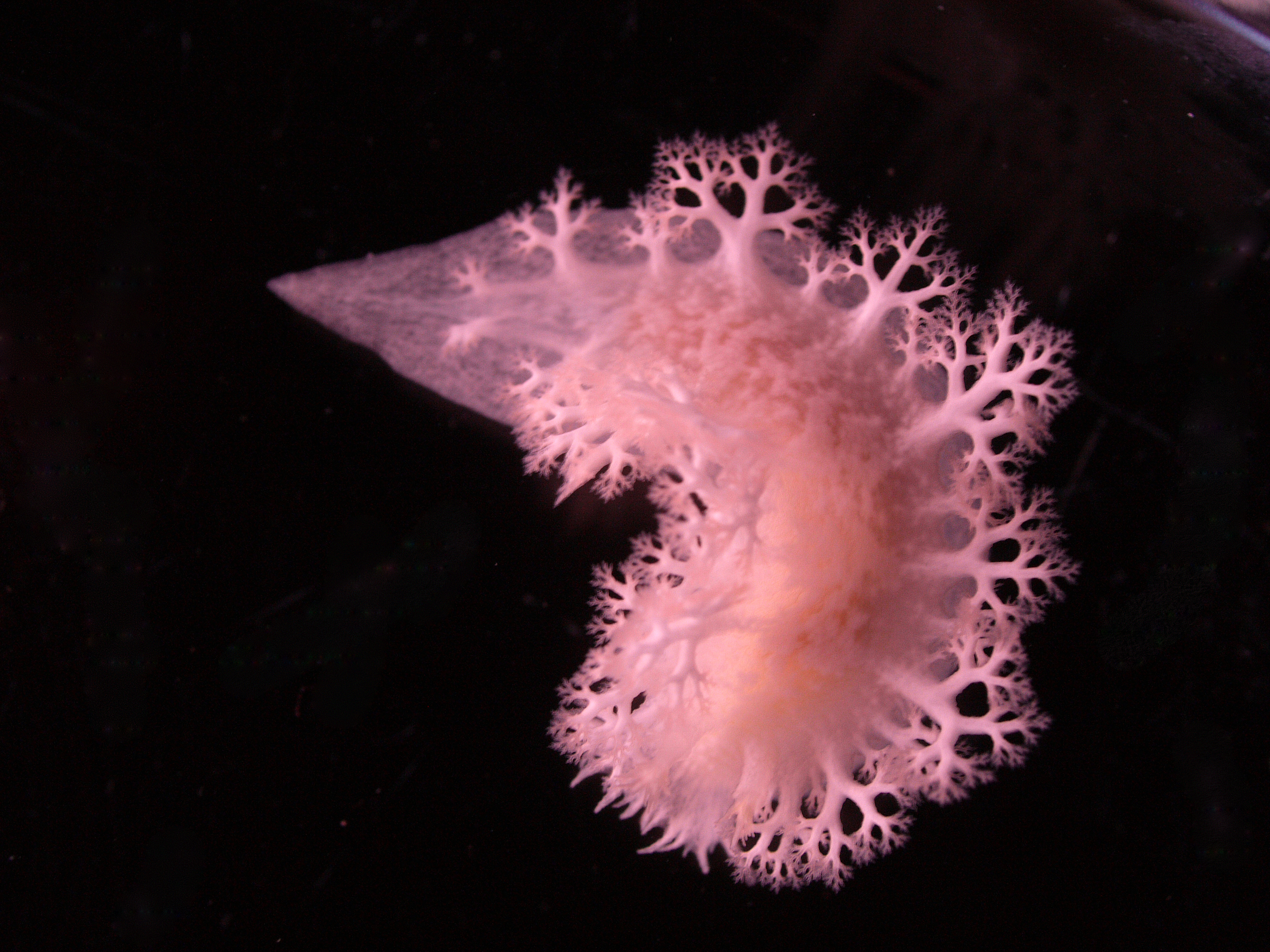
Tritoniopsis elegans

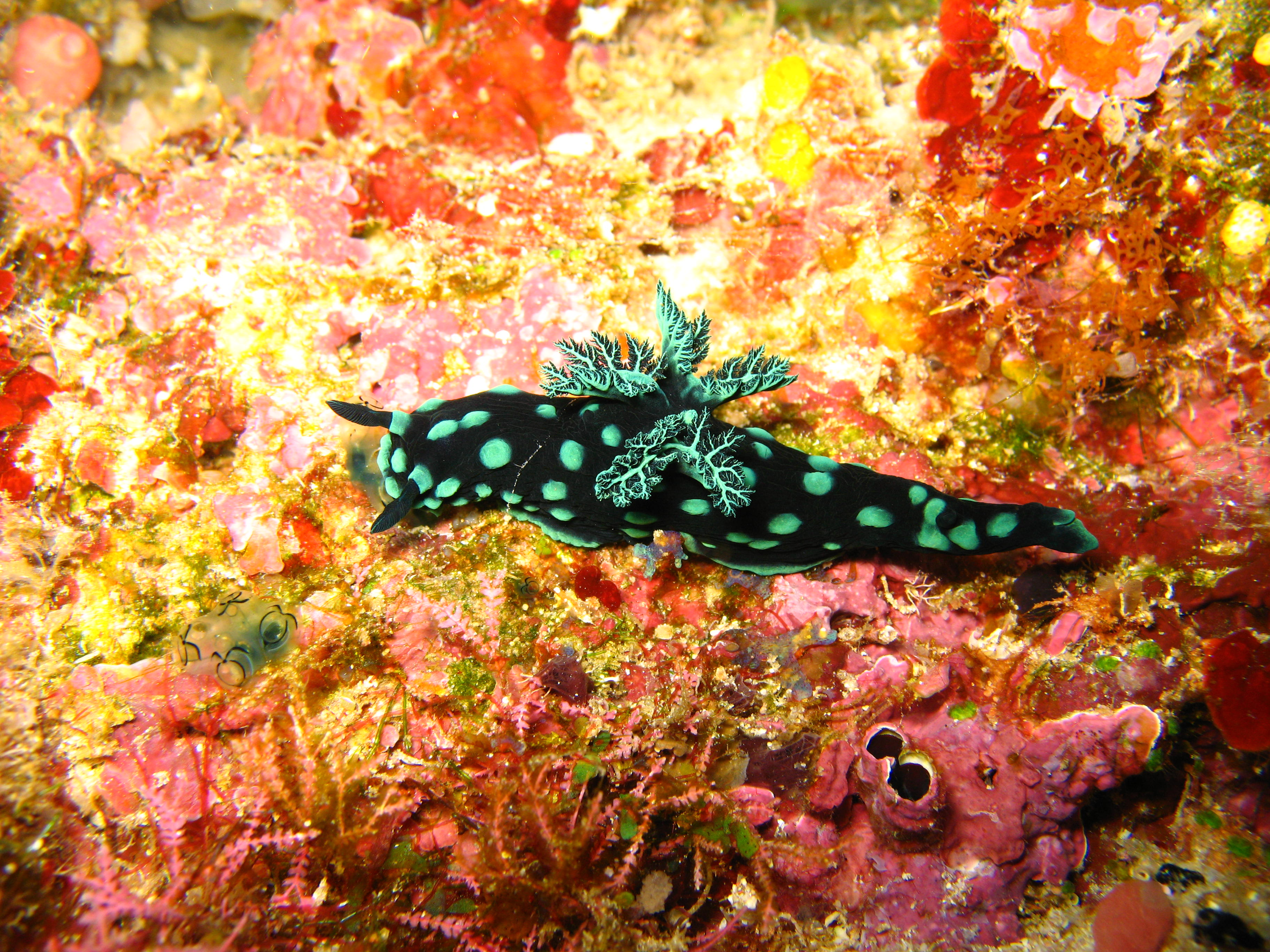
Nembrotha cristata in Bunaken National Park

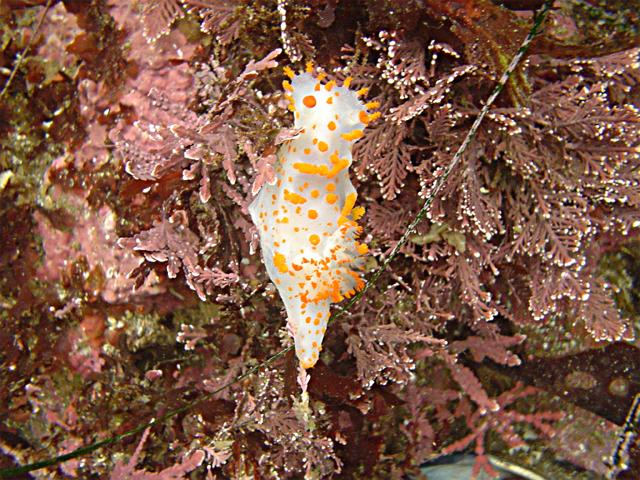
Sea clown (Triopha catalinae), Northern California

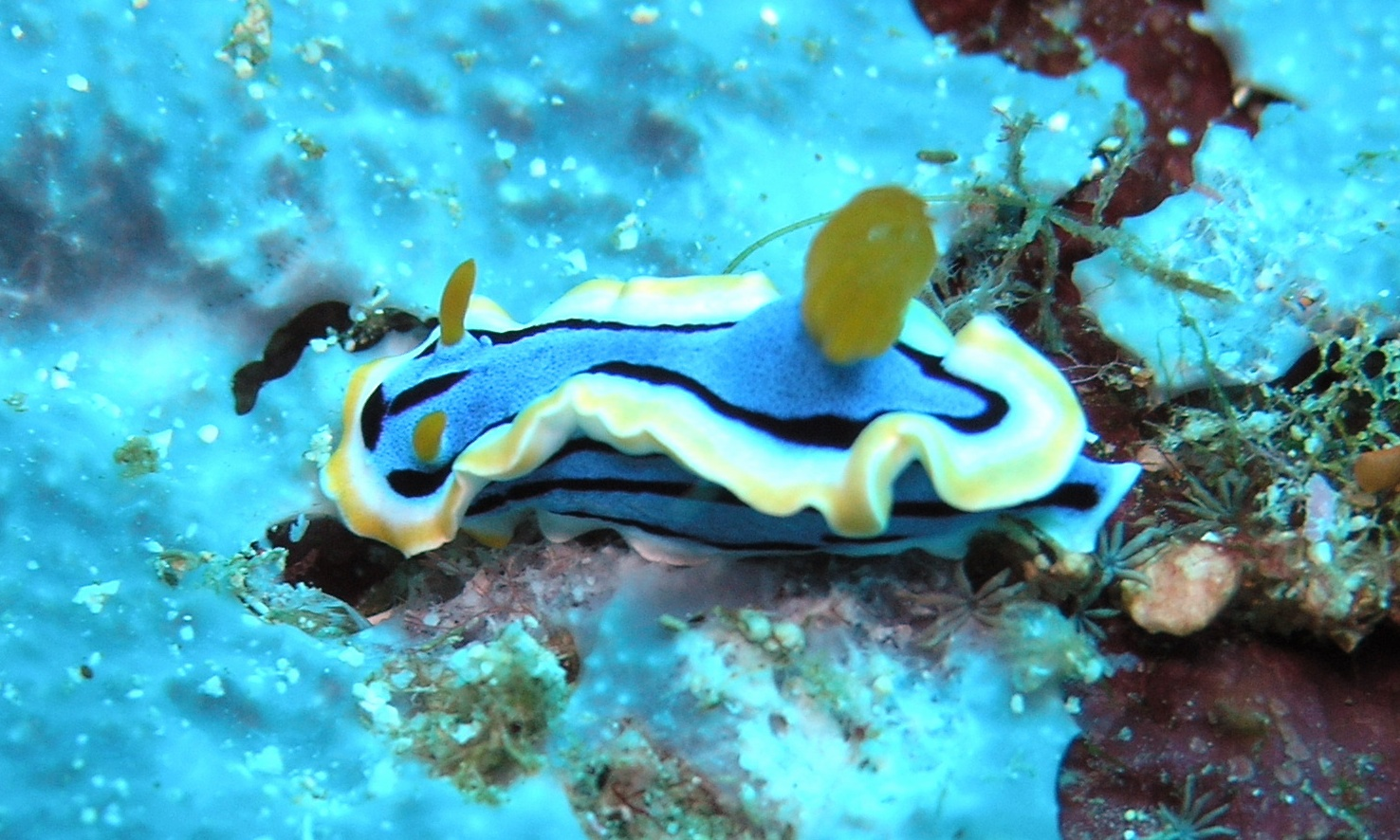
Chromodoris annae from Lembeh Straits, Indonesia

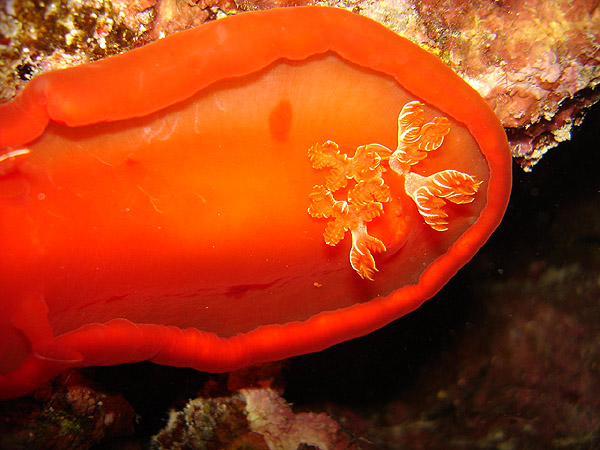
Spanish dancer (Hexabranchus sanguineus), taken at night, Red Sea

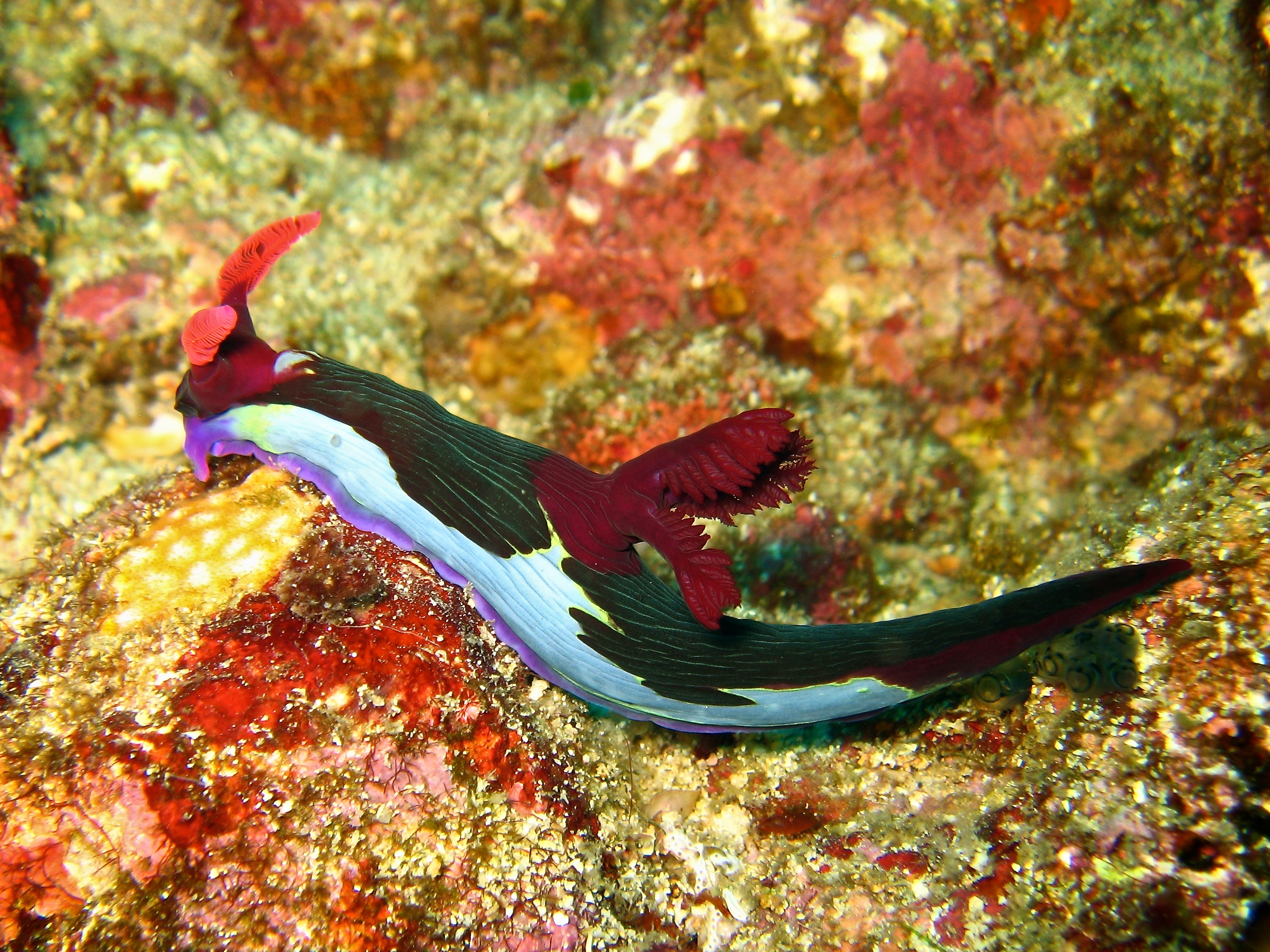
Nembrotha chamberlaini from Verde Island, the Philippines

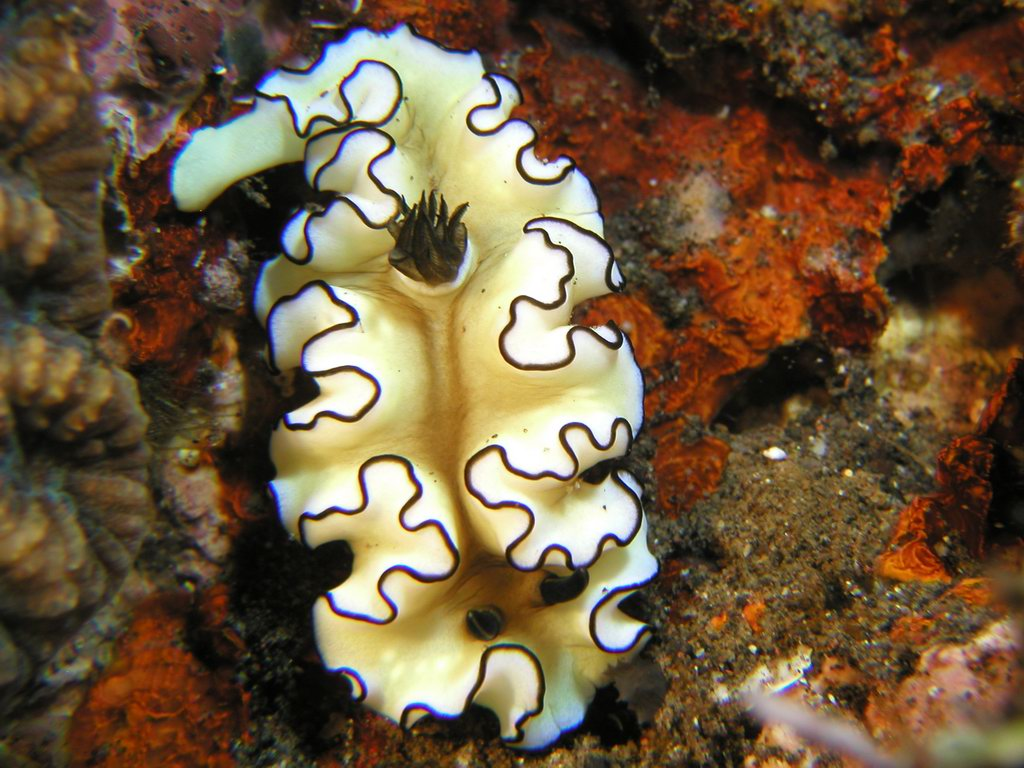
Glossodoris atromarginata

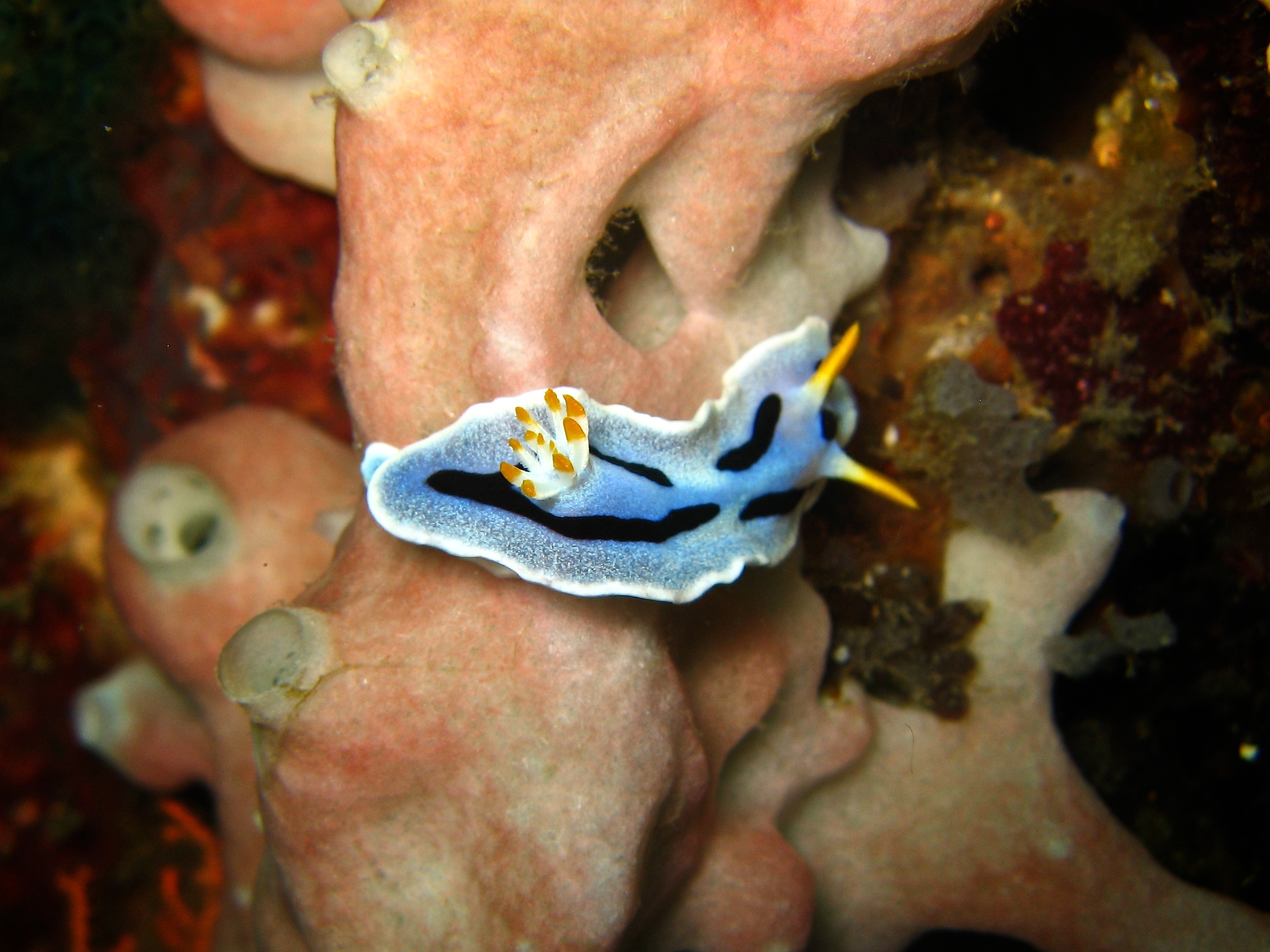
Chromodoris alcalai from Verde Island, the Philippines

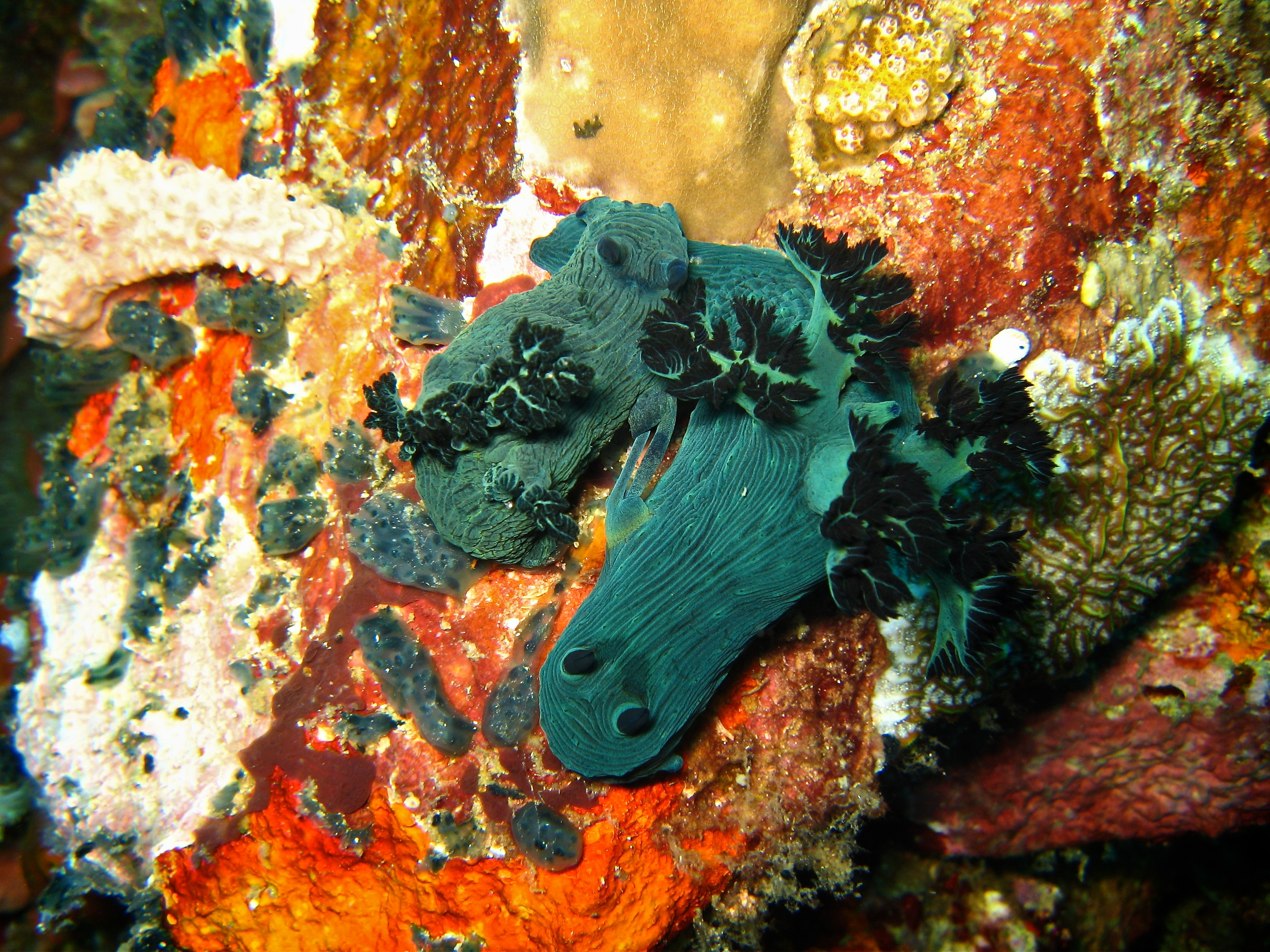
A pair of Nembrotha milleri mating at Verde Island, the Philippines

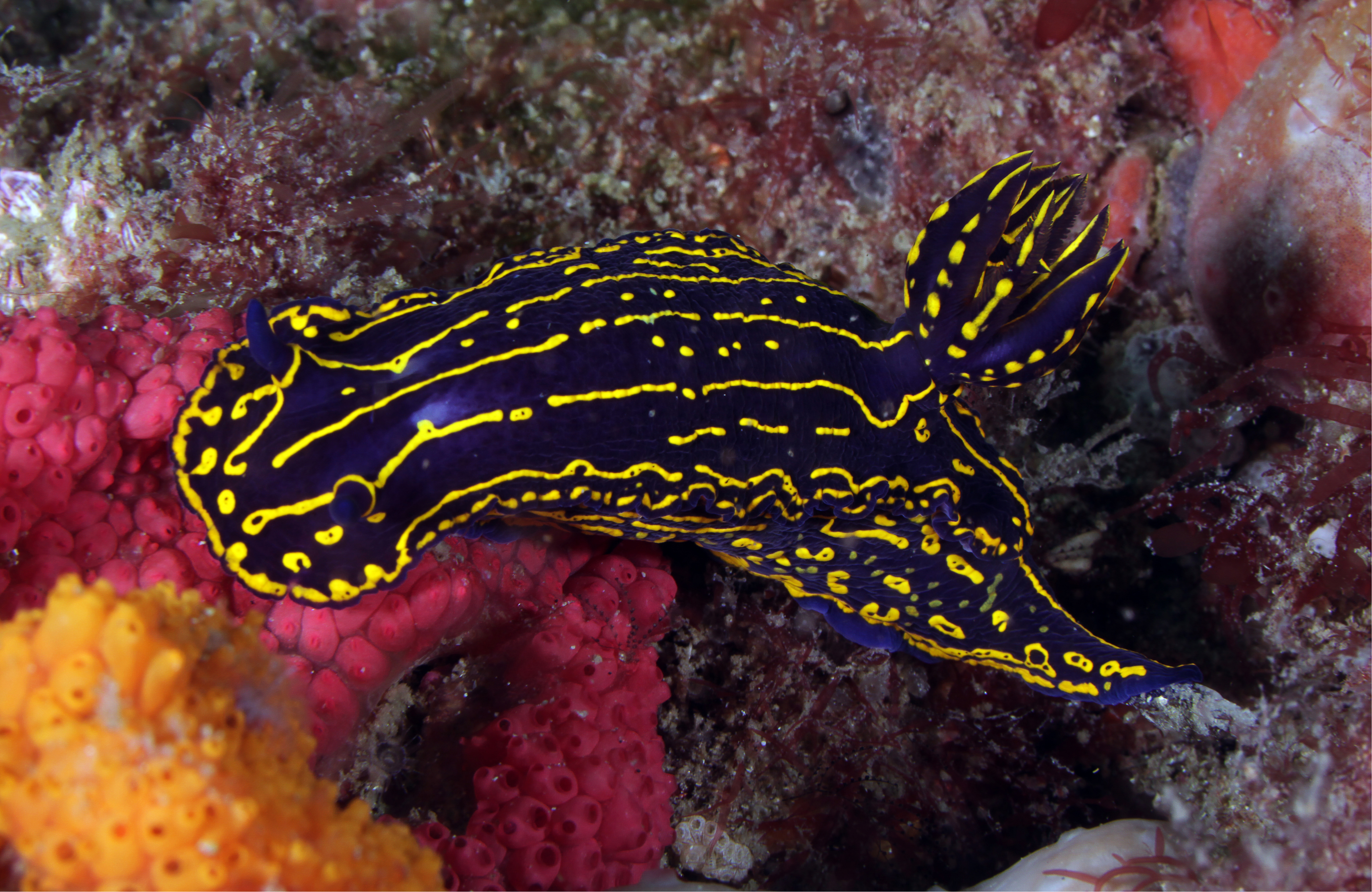
Regal sea goddess (Felimare picta) in the Gray's Reef National Marine Sanctuary, Savannah, Georgia

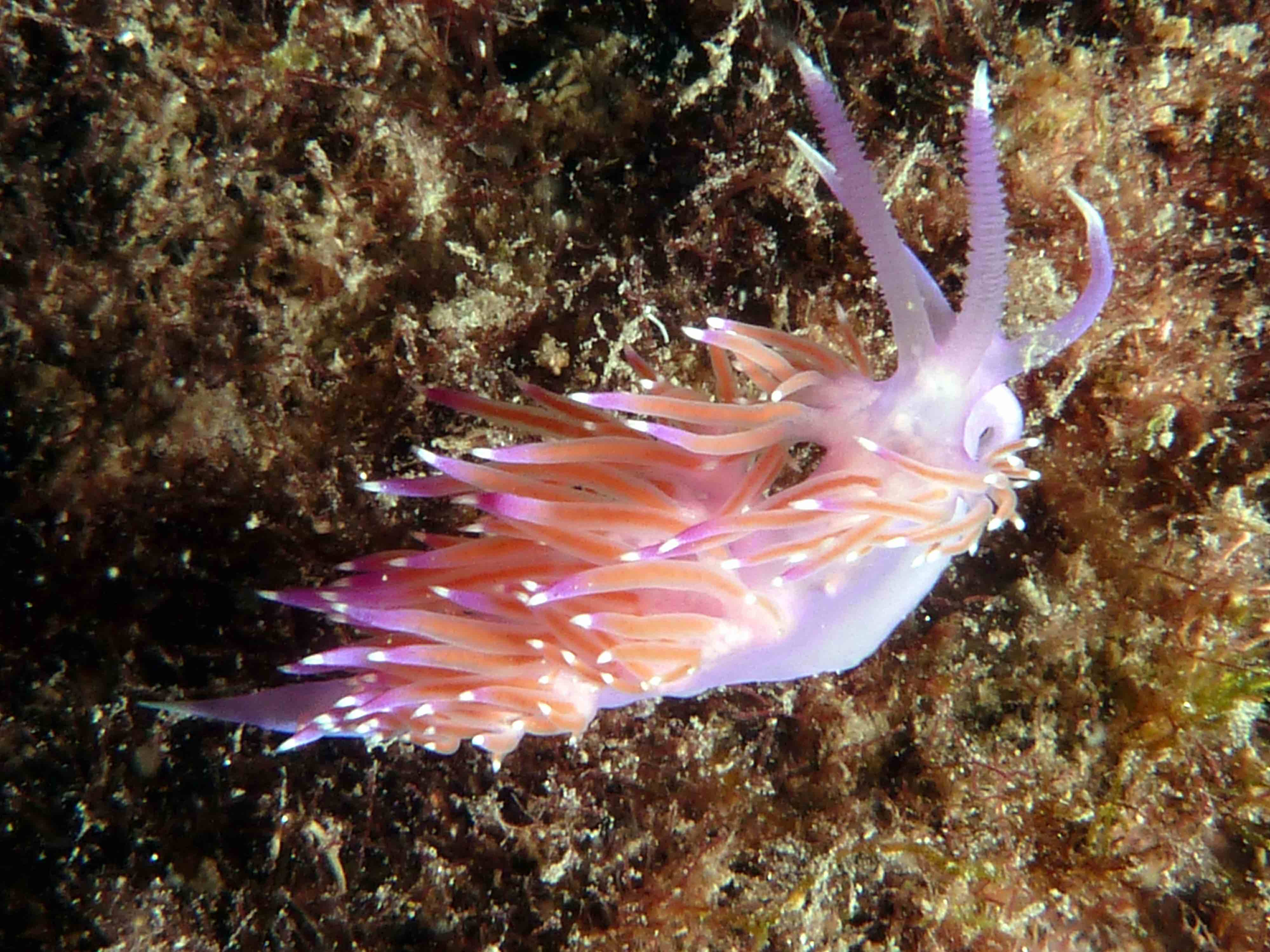
Flabellina affinis at La Herradura (Mediterranean Sea), Spain

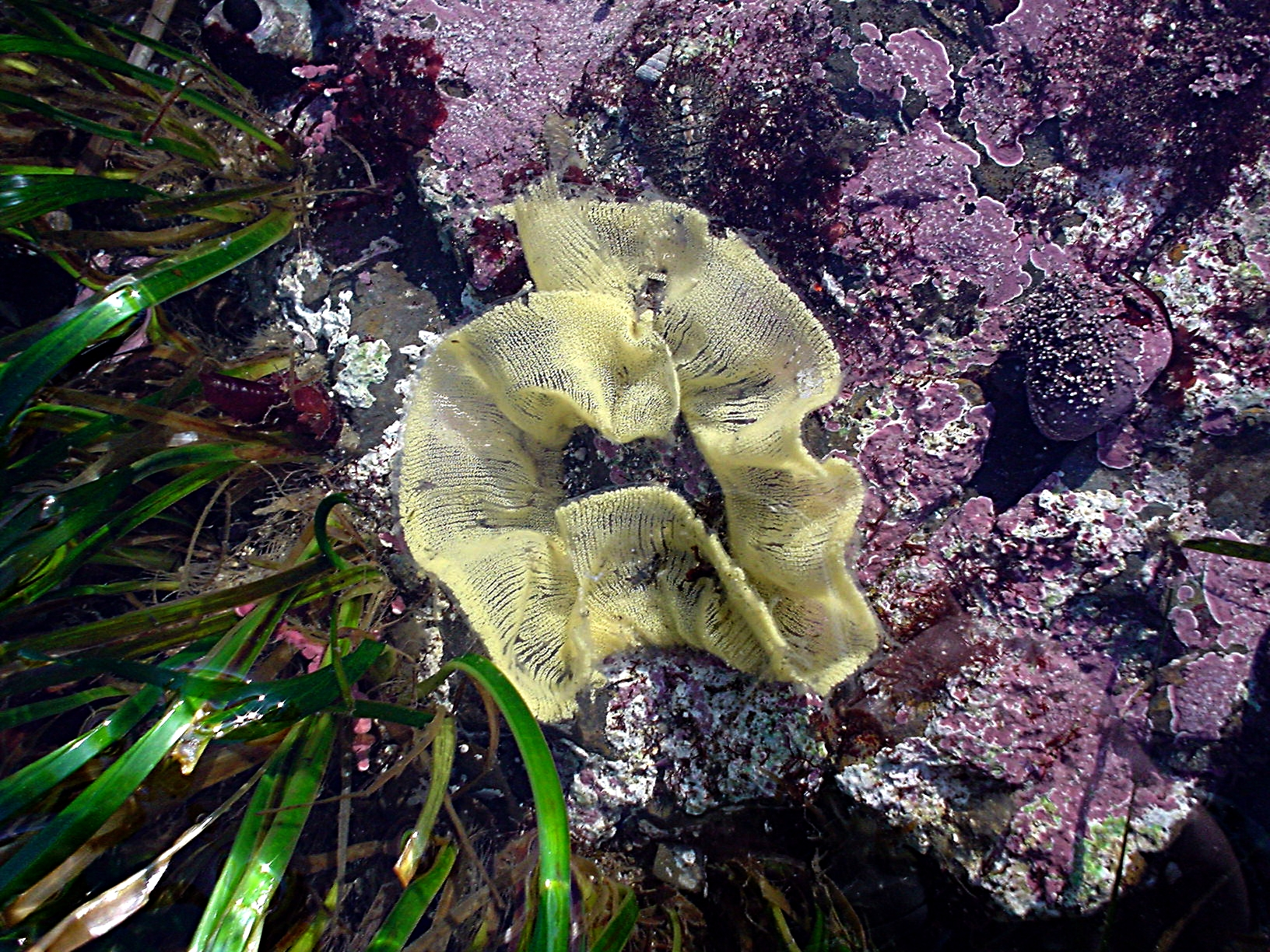
Dorid nudibranch egg ribbon in Moss Beach, California

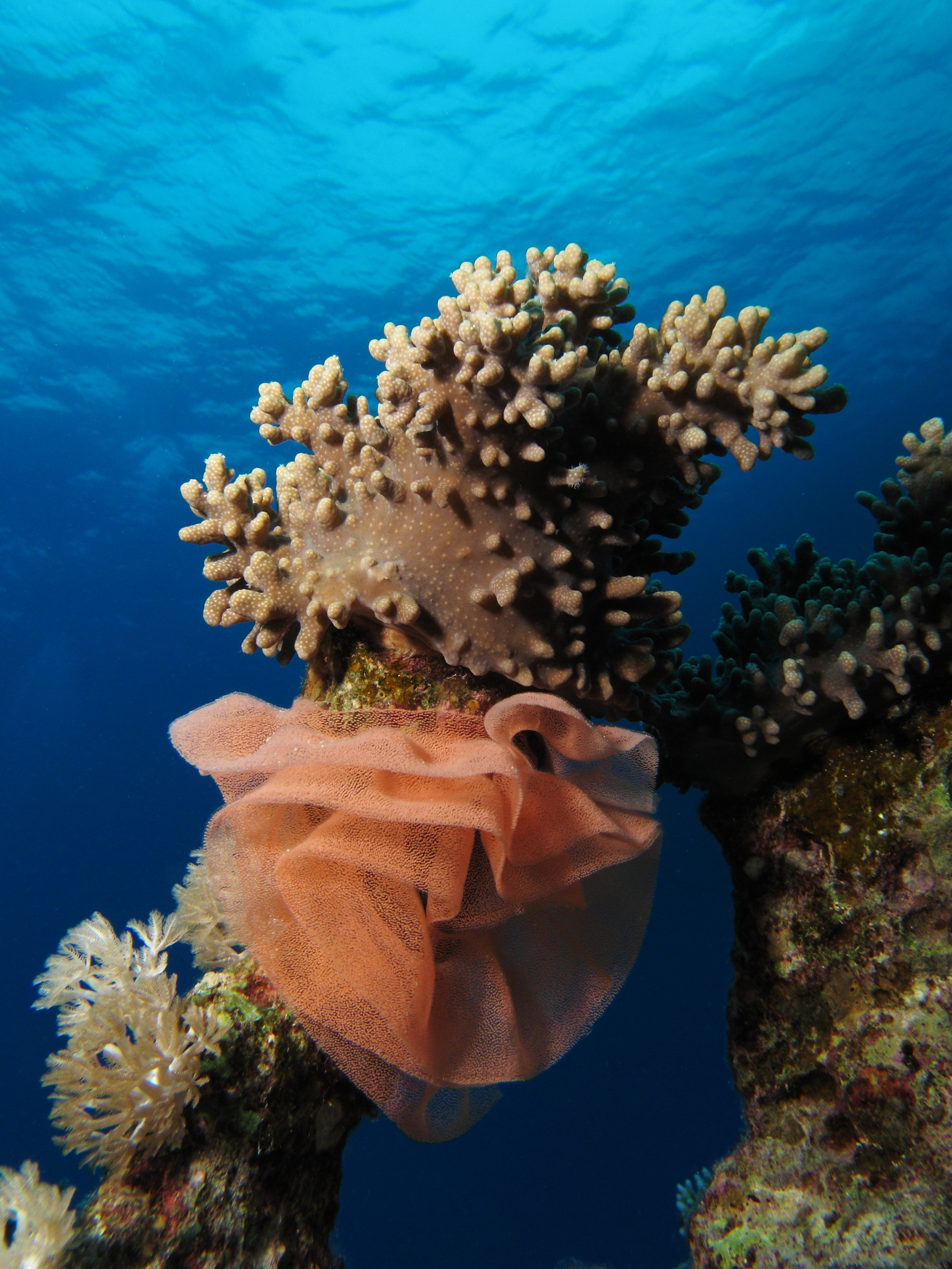
Nudibranch egg ribbon at Shaab Mahmoud (Red Sea), Egypt

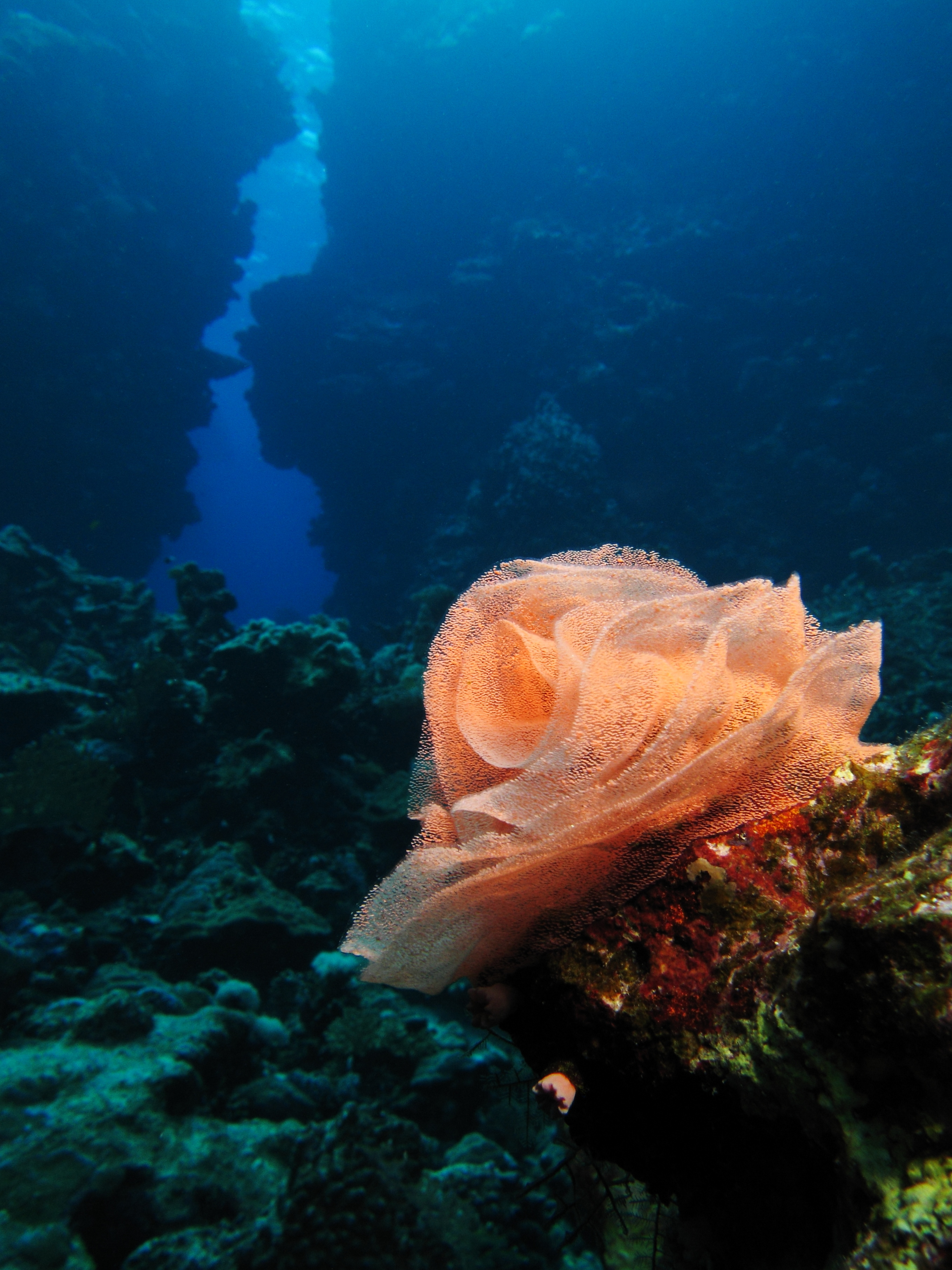
Nudibranch egg ribbon at Malahi (Red Sea), Egypt

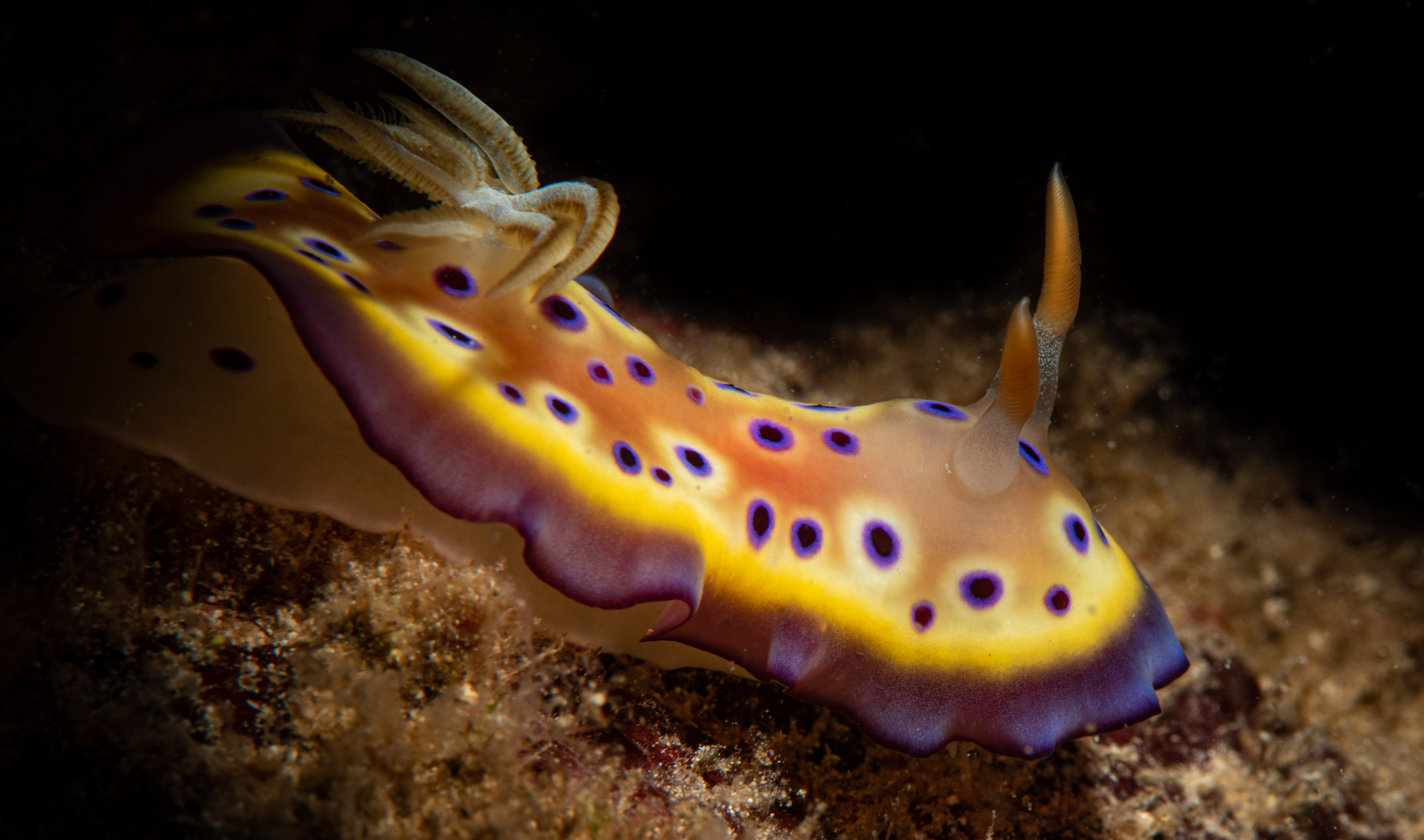
Goniobranchus kuniei, off the coast of Papua New Guinea

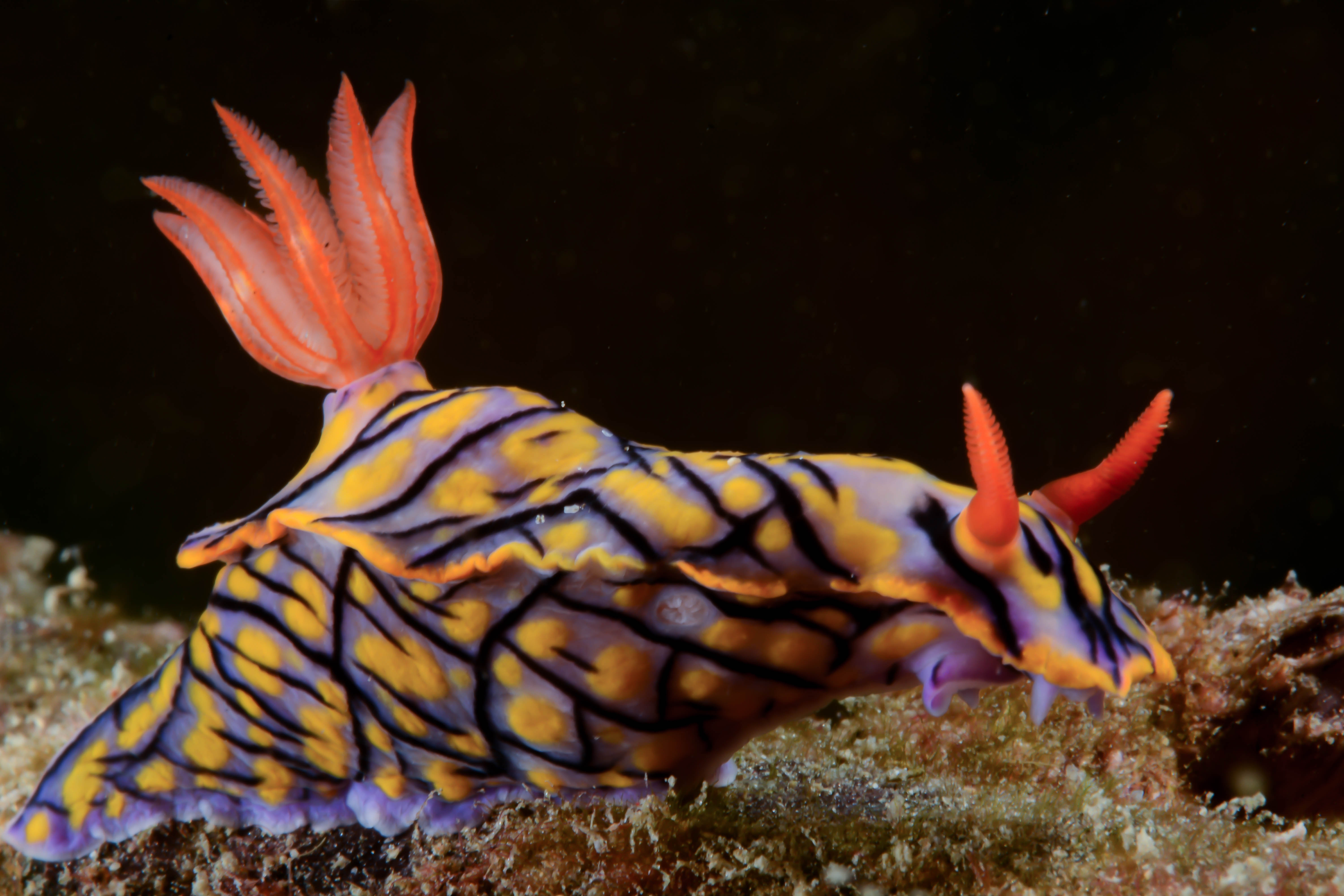
Hypselodoris nigrostriata

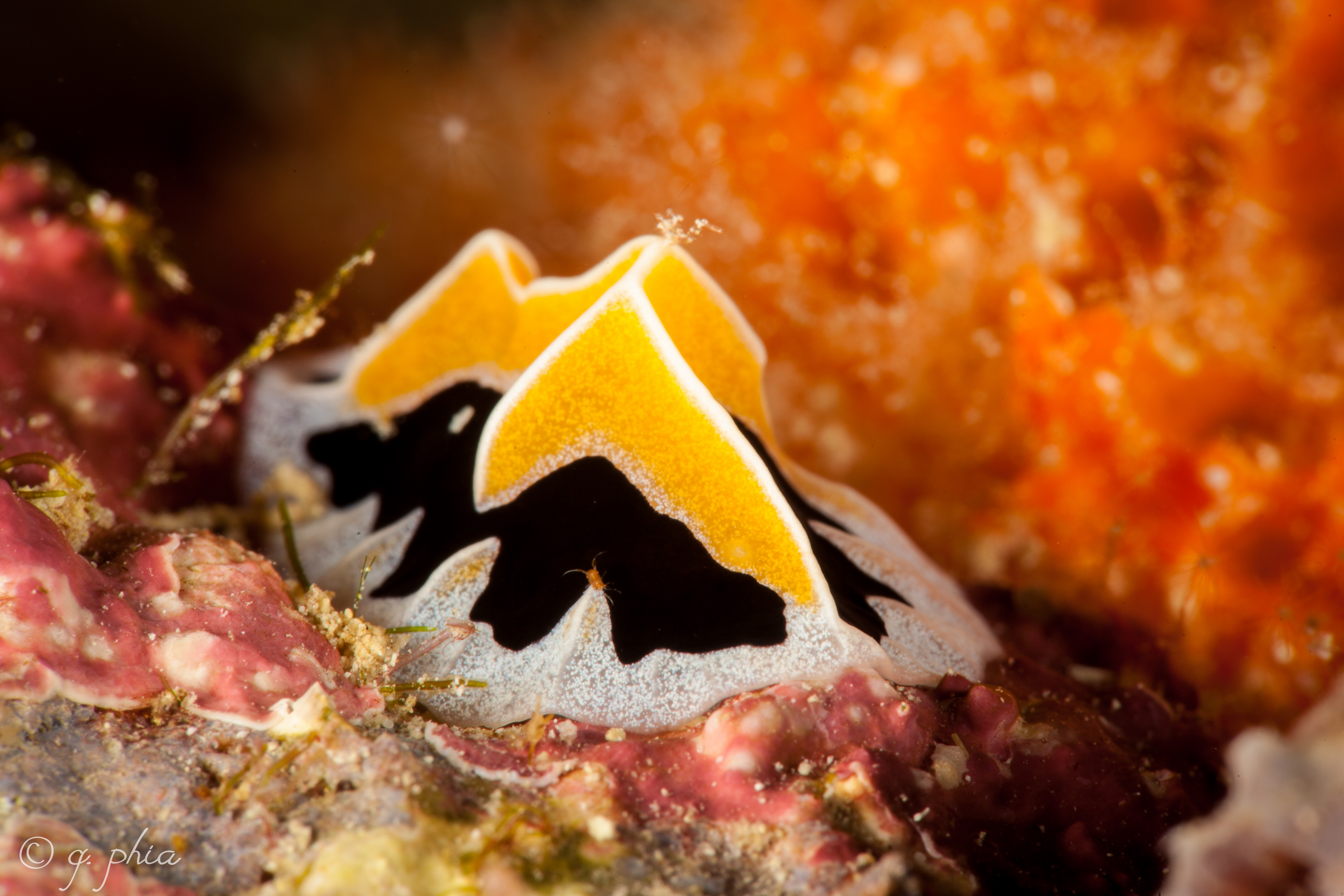
Mushroom coral reticulidia (Reticulidia fungia), at Wakatobi National Park, Indonesia, 2018

== See also ==
- Symposia and workshops on opisthobranchs
