= Kaloplocamus maculatus =

Scientific classification
- Kingdom: Animalia
- Phylum: Mollusca
- Class: Gastropoda
- Order: Nudibranchia
- Family: Polyceridae
- Genus: Kaloplocamus
- Species: K. maculatus

Binomial name
- Kaloplocamus maculatus (Bergh, 1898)

Species of gastropod

Kaloplocamus maculatus is a species of sea slug, a nudibranch, a shell-less marine gastropod mollusc in the family Polyceridae.

== Distribution ==
This species was described from Chile as Euplocamus maculatus. Recent finds of larger animals from this area suggest that it may actually be a Plocamopherus species, but the name Plocamopherus maculatus is occupied by another species.
