= Plocamopherus pecoso =

Scientific classification
- Kingdom: Animalia
- Phylum: Mollusca
- Class: Gastropoda
- Order: Nudibranchia
- Family: Polyceridae
- Genus: Plocamopherus
- Species: P. pecoso

Binomial name
- Plocamopherus pecoso Vallès & Gosliner, 2006

Species of gastropod

Plocamopherus pecoso is a species of sea slug, a nudibranch, a shell-less marine gastropod mollusk in the family Polyceridae.

== Description ==
"In life its body shape is elongate, limaciform and anteriorly rounded. The head bears a fringed oral veil with eight short, small and ramified appendages. The oral tentacles are flat. Plocamopherus pecoso has a transparent white background color heavily speckled all over the body with small orange dots. These orange dots become much larger and fewer at the base of the foot. The presence of minute brown dots surrounding the lateral appendages base and along the keel was observed (these brown dots are present all over the body in other specimens of this species). There are some white dots that are usually situated on the notum along a non-continuous line at the margin of both sides of the animal and joining behind the branchial gills. They are also present along the margin of the fringed oral veil on the tip of the tail, tips of branchiae, clavus of the rhinophores, dorsal tubercles and oral veil appendages but they are slightly larger and scarce. The long rhinophores are translucent and speckled with brown at the peduncle and clavus. A white spot is present at the tip of the clavus. The rhinophoral sheath is long. There are three pairs of short lateral appendages; the two posterior pairs have a prominent, brown, rounded globular structure. Usually the posterior most pair has the larger globular structure, although exceptions have been observed. All lateral appendages are slightly ramified and whitish at the tip. There are three principal tripinnate branchial leaves, which do not form a complete circle around the anus. The posterior portion of the foot forms a well-developed keel that has a small crest tipped with white."

== Distribution ==
This species was described from Luzon in the Philippines. It has only been found at other locations in the Philippines.
