= Plocamopherus lucayensis =

Scientific classification
- Kingdom: Animalia
- Phylum: Mollusca
- Class: Gastropoda
- Order: Nudibranchia
- Family: Polyceridae
- Genus: Plocamopherus
- Species: P. lucayensis

Binomial name
- Plocamopherus lucayensis Hamann & Farmer, 1988

Species of gastropod

Plocamopherus lucayensis is a species of sea slug, a nudibranch, a shell-less marine gastropod mollusk in the family Polyceridae.

== Distribution ==
This species was described from the Bahamas. It has since been reported from Curacao and Florida.
