= Kankelibranchus alhenae =

Scientific classification
- Domain: Eukaryota
- Kingdom: Animalia
- Phylum: Mollusca
- Class: Gastropoda
- Order: Nudibranchia
- Superfamily: Polyceroidea
- Family: Polyceridae
- Genus: Kankelibranchus
- Species: K. alhenae

Binomial name
- Kankelibranchus alhenae Ortea, Espinosa & Moro, 2009

Species of gastropod

Kankelibranchus alhenae is a species of sea slug, a nudibranch, a shell-less marine gastropod mollusc in the family Polyceridae.

== Distribution ==
This species was described from seven specimens collected at 1–8 m depth at Maria La Gorda, Guanahacabibes, Pinar del Rio, Cuba.

== Description ==
The general colouration of the body is hyaline white, with a reticulate orange pattern similar to branches of the bryozoan on which the animals were living (Cauda sp.), whose fabric and complexity increases with the size of the animals. In the smallest, 1–2 mm in length, there are only four fragmented orange lines in the anterior half of the body and four more on the tail, which is anastomosed between; in addition, shows some white pigment and a yellowish spherical structure in the middle of the tail. When it reaches the size of 15 mm, the network of orange lines on the body becomes more apparent, and between them are observed conical tubercles and snow-white and black dots, the white pigment being more abundant in the anterior half of the body and black on the back; on the back of the tail and to the sides of it there are tubercles with white greater size that of the region above body. Finally, in the animals of 20–25 mm, the cross-linked orange peel becomes more apparent and the white tubercles in the anterior half form a cross on the head whose long arm stretches between the two rhinophores. The head is as wide as the region of the gill and the appearance of the animal is more robust to slender, with the sides of the body parallel, narrowing abruptly to the tip of the tail. On the cephalic veil of all the animals there are six processes; three large and two small ones, the latter behind the rhinophores, which are predominantly orange in colour; in the animals of 1–2 mm the velar processes are simple or with 2-3 branches; the 15 mm animals will have at least five of them, more branched; in the 25 mm animals there is a thick trunk in the bottom half and number of branches increased to five in the upper part. Six more branched processes are found on each side of the body, from the gills to the tail in the specimens of 1–2 mm, of which the greater the more above; their number and complexity increases with the size of the animals, until you get to 12 in the specimens of 25 mm, but it's always the first 6 are more developed than the rest. Also on the back of the tail are branched processes, which increase with the size of the animals, and are pigmented with white or whitish yellow. The gill is placed at the end of the anterior half of the body; it is formed by three simple leaves in the animals of 1–2 mm, and by five leaves in the rest with the anterior gill leaf largest and most branched; the inside of the gill around the anus and the internal face of the rachis of the leaves becomes increasingly dark to as the animals grow, being dark grey to black at 25 mm, while the ramifications are always white or hyaline with orange spots. Anal papilla wide, located in the center of the arc of gills, with the edge of the opening white and the trunk dark grey in older individuals. The anterior edge of the foot has tentacular expansions at the angles, as the oral veil and the sole colour is salmon, translucent, with a speck or orange dot. The rhinophores are cylindrical and robust, with 10 lamellae in larger animals; the peduncle is hyaline with points and patches of white, orange and grey, like that the lamellae. There is a long apical mucron which is red-orange with the apex white and a translucent sheath, with some little spots of white and orange on the edge.
