= Plocamopherus maculapodium =

Scientific classification
- Kingdom: Animalia
- Phylum: Mollusca
- Class: Gastropoda
- Order: Nudibranchia
- Family: Polyceridae
- Genus: Plocamopherus
- Species: P. maculapodium

Binomial name
- Plocamopherus maculapodium Vallès & Gosliner, 2006

Species of gastropod

Plocamopherus maculapodium is a species of sea slug, a nudibranch, a shell-less marine gastropod mollusk in the family Polyceridae.

== Description ==
"In life the body shape is elongate, limaciform and anteriorly rounded. The head bears a fringed oral veil without distinct appendages. The presence of flat oral tentacles was observed. Plocamopherus maculapodium has a red background color and the notum is slightly speckled with minute white dots. The white dots are usually situated on the notum along a line at the margin of both sides of the animal and joining behind the branchial leaves. They are also present along the margin of the fringed oral veil, on the tip of the posterior portion of the foot, tips of branchiae, clavus of the rhinophores, dorsal tubercles and oral veil appendages. There are a few black larger spots on the sides of the animal at the base of the foot. The rhinophores are elongate and at the peduncle have the same red background coloration. However, the clavus is red-brown with a white spot at the tip. The rhinophoral sheath is short. There are three pairs of short lateral appendages, with the last pair having a prominent rounded globular structure that is white in color. All lateral appendages are slightly ramified and whitish at the tip. At both sides of the body, four small tubercles are found in both sides situated at a regular distance from each other. There are three tripinnate branchial leaves. The posterior portion of the foot is elongated and thin forming a keel that has a small crest tipped with white."

== Distribution ==
This species was described from Zanzibar. It has also been reported from Papua New Guinea.
