= Kaloplocamus maru =

Scientific classification
- Kingdom: Animalia
- Phylum: Mollusca
- Class: Gastropoda
- Order: Nudibranchia
- Family: Polyceridae
- Genus: Kaloplocamus
- Species: K. maru

Binomial name
- Kaloplocamus maru Vallès & Gosliner, 2006

Species of gastropod

Kaloplocamus maru is a species of sea slug, a nudibranch, a shell-less marine gastropod mollusc in the family Polyceridae.

== Description ==
The living animal has a general orange color. The whole dorsum has brown dots except the tips or apex of the lateral appendages, which are pale yellow. The dorsum has a white diamond shaped spot that runs from the behind of the rhinophores to the tail (just behind the branchial leaves). The end of the foot is acute and has a similar color to the appendage apices. Two types of appendages are observed. The first type of appendages are longer and wider and are positioned at the margin of the sides of the animal. These appendages have apical ramifications that are rounded at the base with a long, thin and sharp prolongation. Small acute ramifications cover the remaining parts of the appendage. The second type of appendage is thin, long with many small sharp, thin and long simple ramifications. These appendages are present on the entire body, sides, foot, and dorsum. The oral veil has four appendages, two of which are longer, situated at the lateral edges of the oral veil and two that are shorter situated in the center. The rhinophores have a lamellate clavus and a peduncule with acute ramifications. Each rhinophoral sheath edge has three ramifications. The middle one is virtually identical to the lateral appendages. The other two ramifications are similar to the smaller tentacles of the rest of the body. The oral tentacles are simple folds of the mantle with the appearance of cylinders. The three branchial leaves are tripinnate. They have the same simple and thin ramifications as the smaller appendages.

== Distribution ==
The type locality for this species is Palau.
