= Plocamopherus apheles =

Scientific classification
- Domain: Eukaryota
- Kingdom: Animalia
- Phylum: Mollusca
- Class: Gastropoda
- Order: Nudibranchia
- Superfamily: Polyceroidea
- Family: Polyceridae
- Genus: Plocamopherus
- Species: P. apheles

Binomial name
- Plocamopherus apheles Barnard, 1927

Species of gastropod

Plocamopherus apheles is a species of sea slug, a nudibranch, a shell-less marine gastropod mollusk in the family Polyceridae.

== Distribution ==
This species was described from East London, South Africa.
