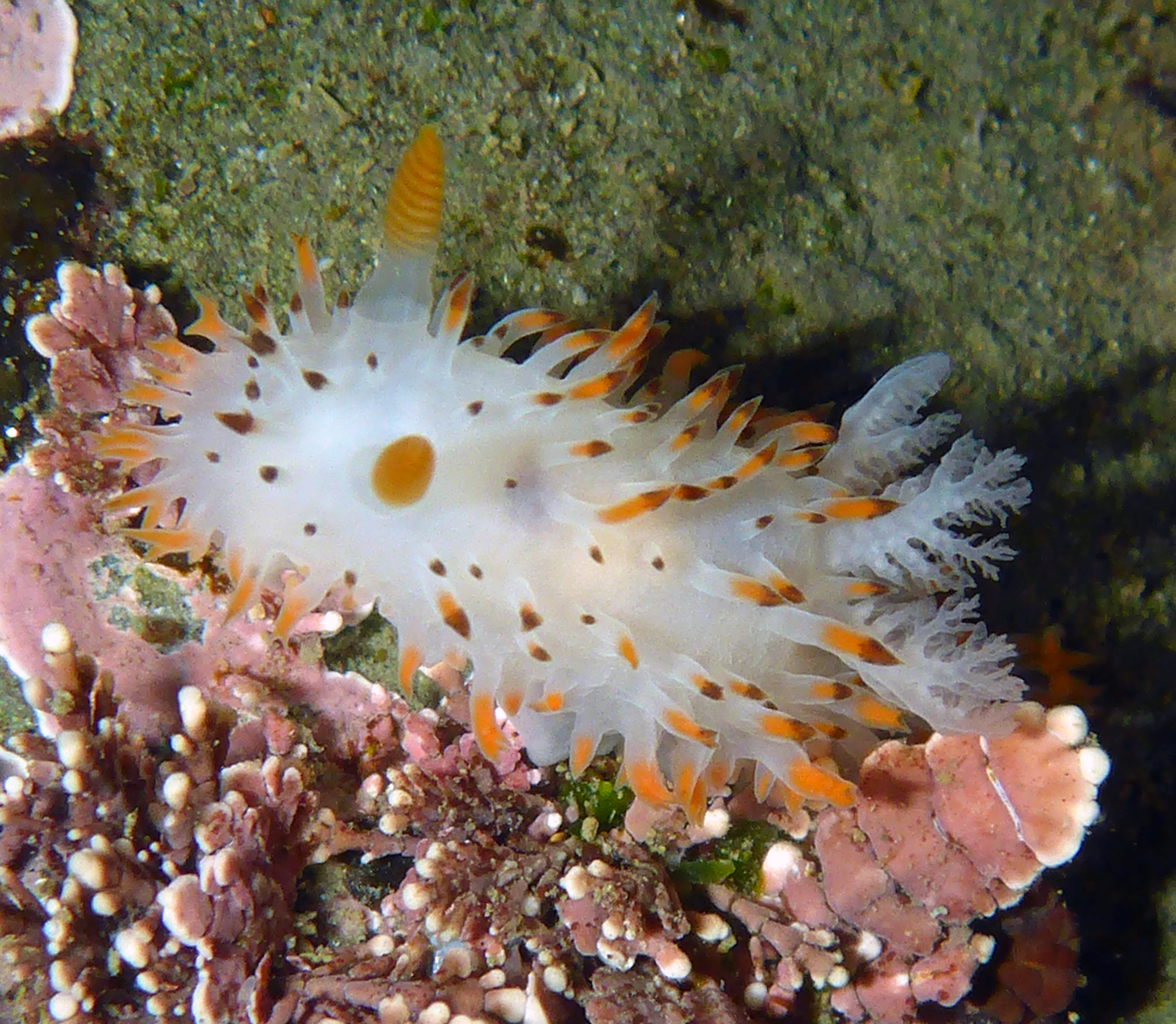
- Crimora coneja from Pillar Point, California

Scientific classification
- Domain: Eukaryota
- Kingdom: Animalia
- Phylum: Mollusca
- Class: Gastropoda
- Order: Nudibranchia
- Superfamily: Polyceroidea
- Family: Polyceridae
- Genus: Crimora
- Species: C. coneja

Binomial name
- Crimora coneja Er. Marcus, 1961

= Crimora coneja =

Species of gastropod

Crimora coneja, the rabbit dorid, is a species of sea slug, a nudibranch, a shell-less marine gastropod mollusc in the family Polyceridae.

== Distribution ==
This species was described from California. It is reported from Point Loma, San Diego, California to Cape Arago, Oregon.
