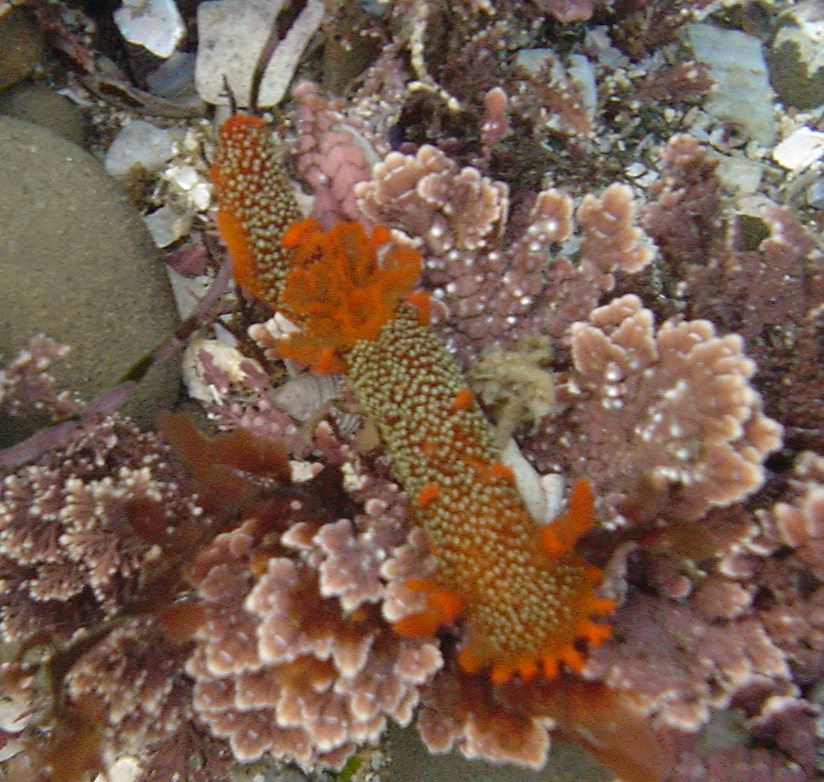

Scientific classification
- Kingdom: Animalia
- Phylum: Mollusca
- Class: Gastropoda
- Order: Nudibranchia
- Family: Polyceridae
- Genus: Triopha
- Species: T. maculata

Binomial name
- Triopha maculata MacFarland, 1905

= Triopha maculata =

Species of gastropod

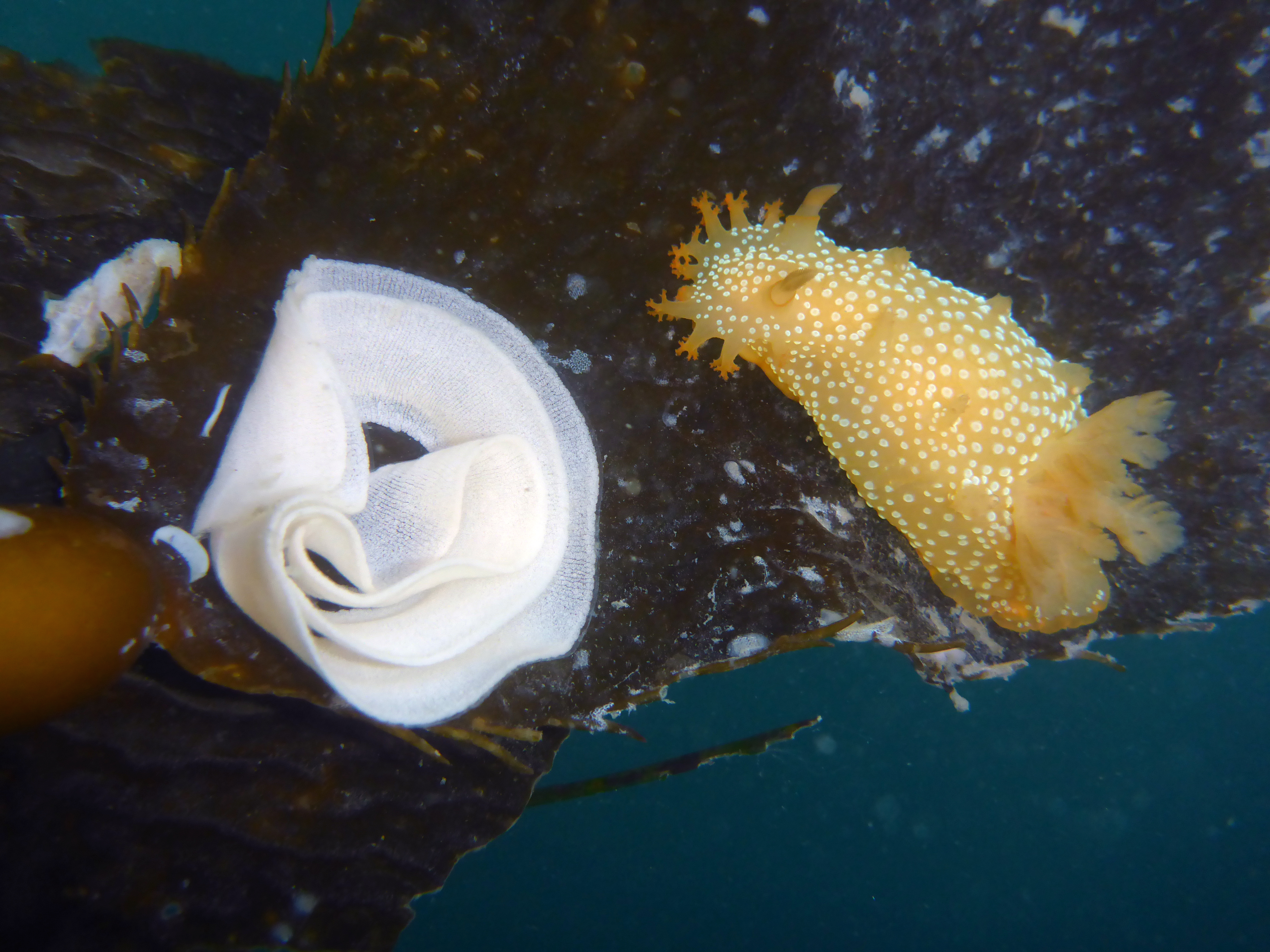
Triopha maculata ADULT with egg mass on giant kelp (Morro Bay, California)

Triopha maculata, common name spotted triopha or speckled triopha, is a species of colorful sea slug, a nudibranch, a shell-less marine gastropod mollusk in the family Polyceridae. This species is very variable in color.

== Distribution ==
This nudibranch lives in the eastern Pacific Ocean, from Vancouver, British Columbia, Canada, to Baja California, Mexico. It also lives in Japan.

== Description ==
Triopha maculata can, on rare occasions, grow as large as 180 mm (a little more than 7 inches) but usually the maximum length is 50 mm (about 2 inches.)

The color can be a very pale and translucent yellow, or it can be a darker yellow, orange, red, and even dark brown. There are always raised whitish spots, hence the name maculata, meaning spotted.

== Life habits ==
This species feeds on bryozoans.

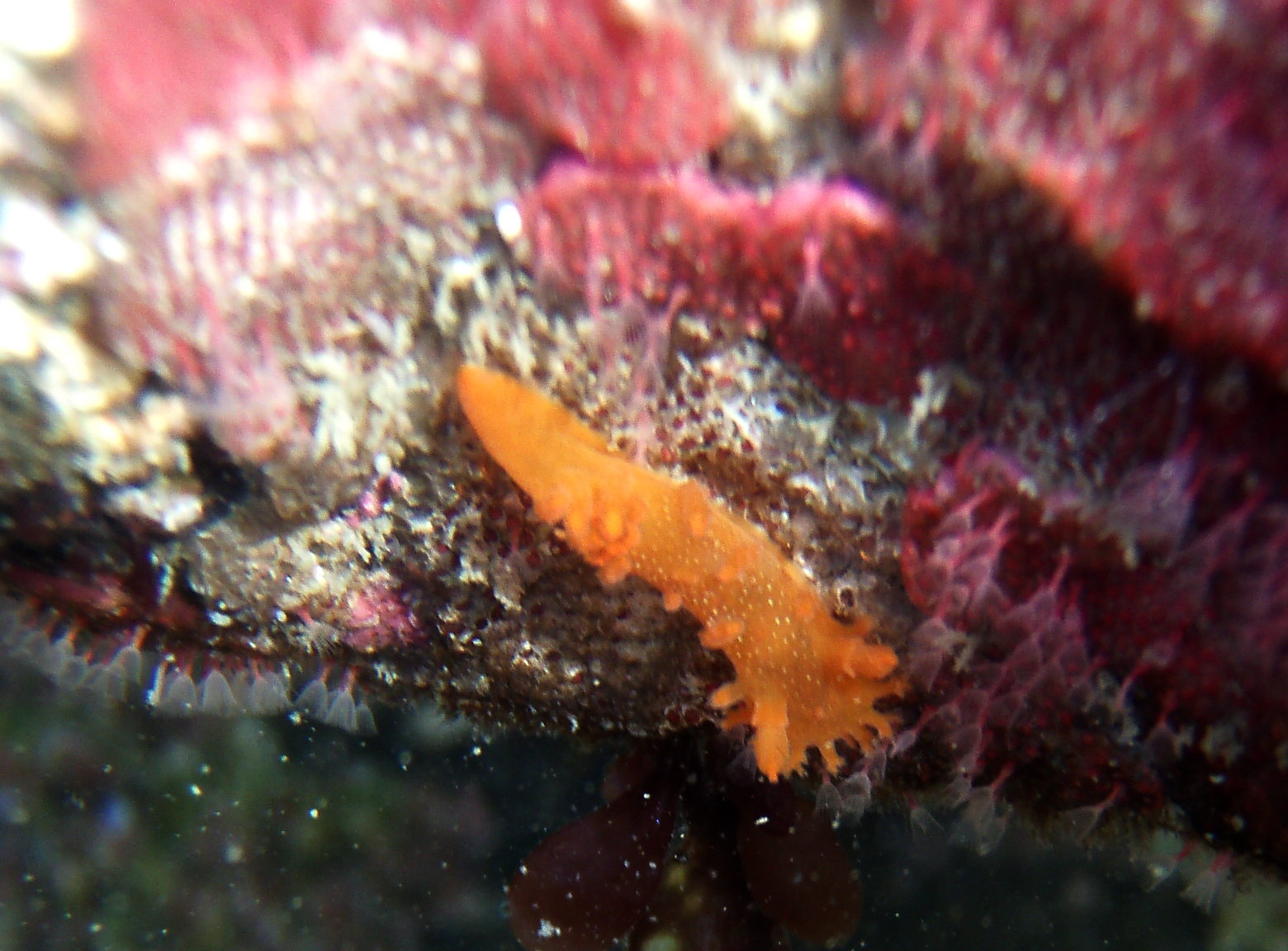
A 5 mm juvenile of the yellow form of Triopha maculata in a California tide pool.

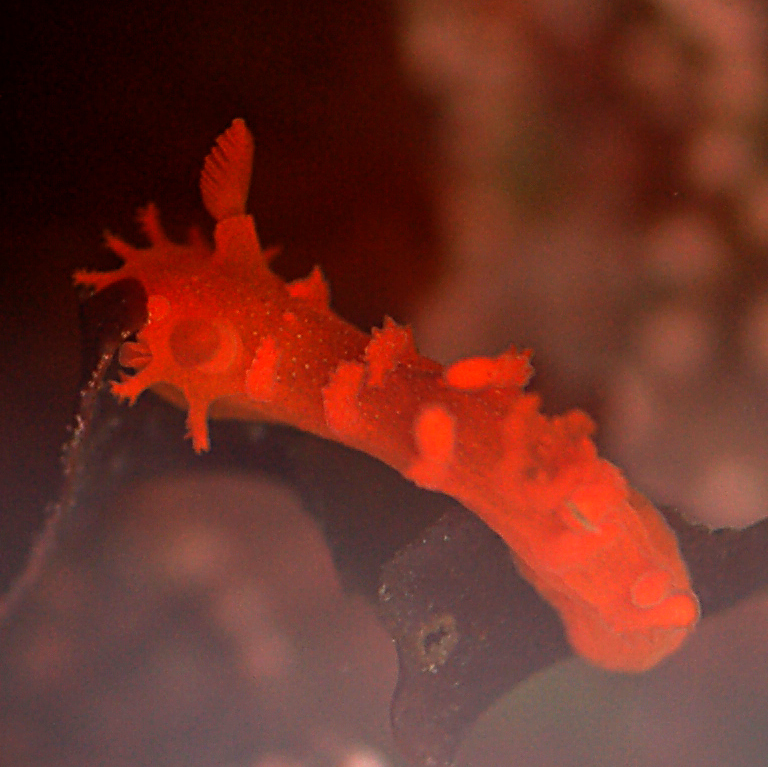
Juvenile Triopha maculata often appear without spots.

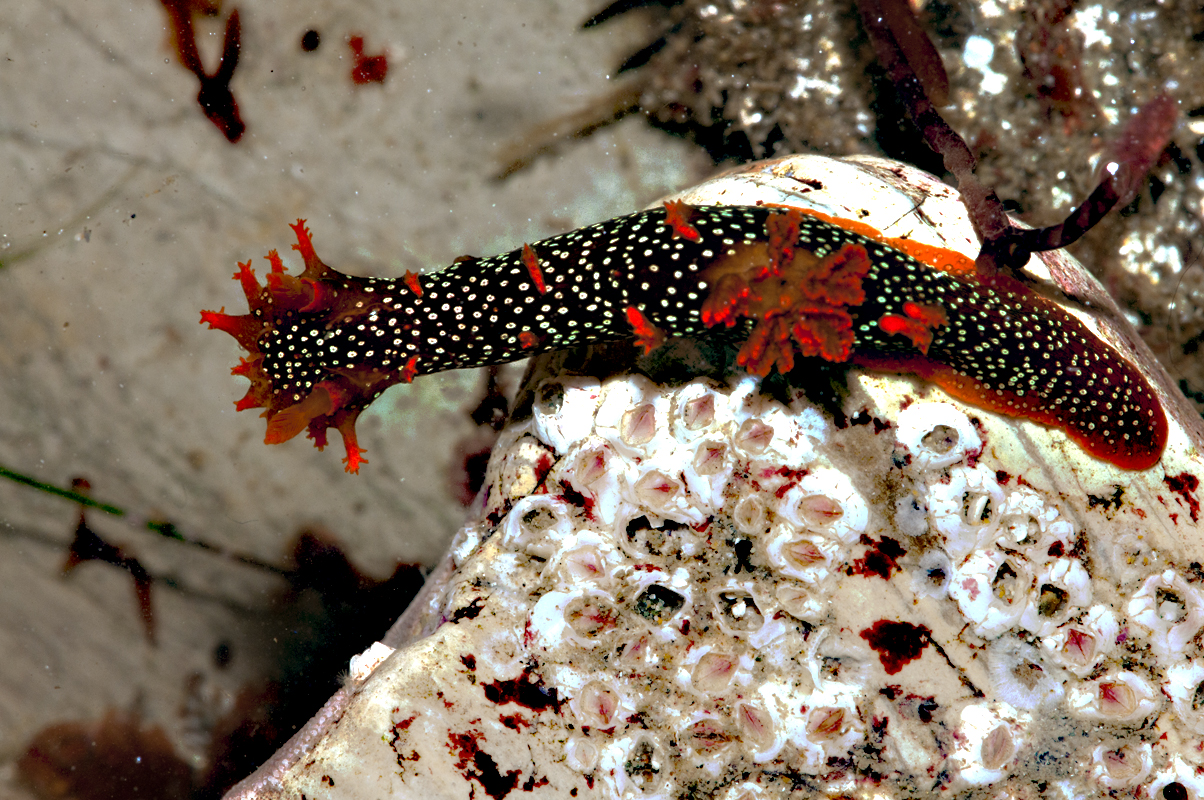
Very colorful Triopha maculata at Hazard Reef, Montana de Oro State Park.
