= Kaloplocamus dokte =

Scientific classification
- Kingdom: Animalia
- Phylum: Mollusca
- Class: Gastropoda
- Order: Nudibranchia
- Family: Polyceridae
- Genus: Kaloplocamus
- Species: K. dokte

Binomial name
- Kaloplocamus dokte Vallès & Gosliner, 2006

Species of gastropod

Kaloplocamus dokte is a species of sea slug, a nudibranch, a shell-less marine gastropod mollusc in the family Polyceridae.

== Description ==
When alive, this species appears to be ovoid in shape but upon a closer view, the posterior portion of the foot is elongated. Most of the animal is opaque white except for the posterior end of the foot and the eight velar appendages, which are highly transparent. The dorsal and central portions of the body are translucent and the digestive gland is visible. The three tripinnate branchial leaves, are a translucent red-carmine. The rhinophores are of the same color as the branchial leaves, but more translucent with white dots on the apex. The long, large, lateral appendages are totally opaque white except at the apex, where they ramify and become more cream in tone. There are four pairs of lateral appendages. They are smooth with ramifications in the apex only. Instead of being sharp and long these ramifications are rounded, almost globular and there are many of them resembling in shape to a bunch of grapes. These ramifications only occur on the exterior portion of the lateral appendage, with the interior portion being smooth over its entire length.

== Distribution ==
The type locality for this species is Barracuda Point, Madang, Papua New Guinea. In the original description it has also been reported from the Philippines and Indonesia.
