= Plocamopherus indicus =

Scientific classification
- Kingdom: Animalia
- Phylum: Mollusca
- Class: Gastropoda
- Order: Nudibranchia
- Family: Polyceridae
- Genus: Plocamopherus
- Species: P. indicus

Binomial name
- Plocamopherus indicus Bergh, 1890

Species of gastropod

Plocamopherus indicus is a species of sea slug, a nudibranch, a shell-less marine gastropod mollusk in the family Polyceridae.

== Distribution ==
This species was described from Ambon Island, Indonesia.
