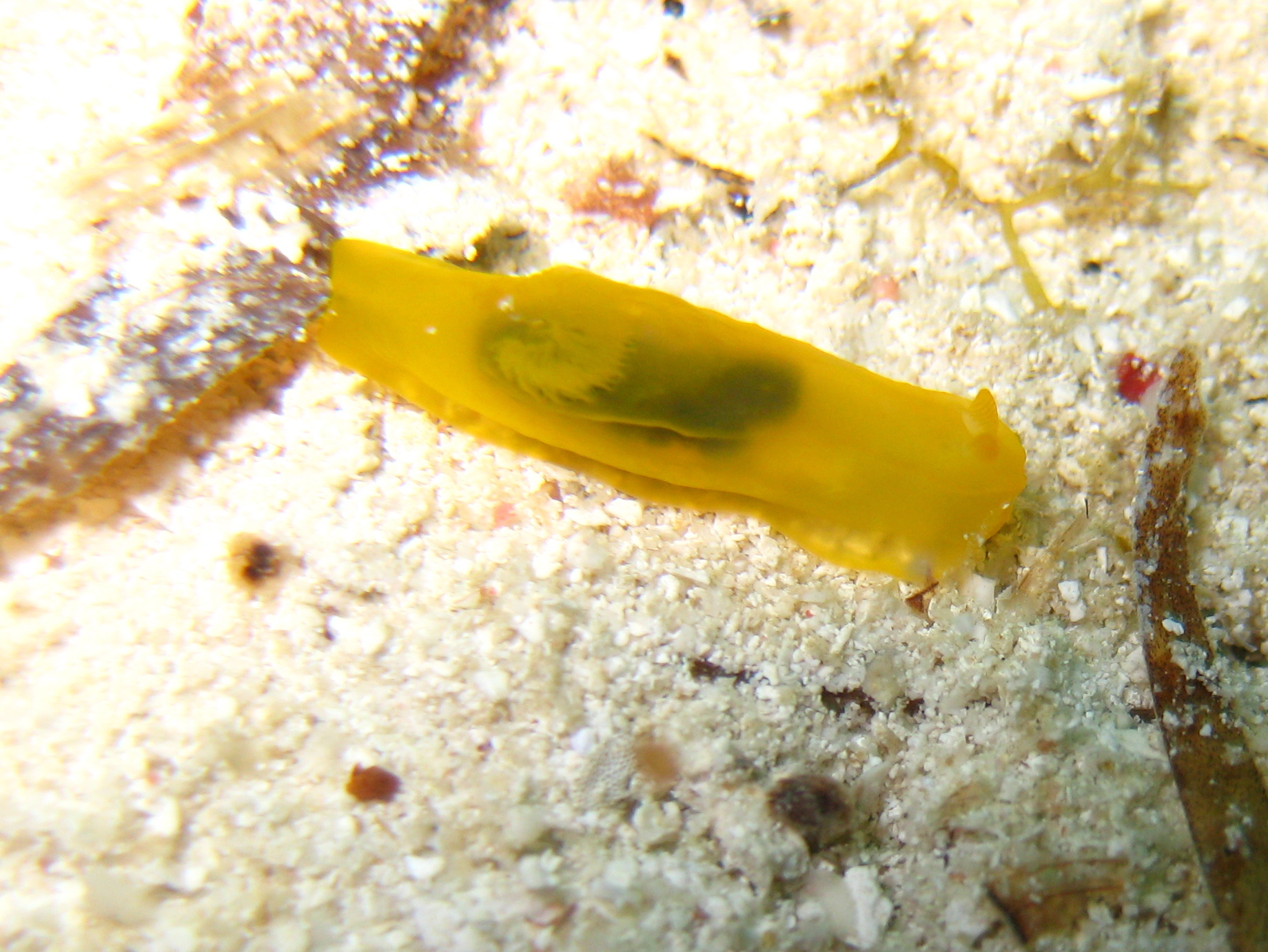

Scientific classification
- Kingdom: Animalia
- Phylum: Mollusca
- Class: Gastropoda
- Order: Nudibranchia
- Family: Polyceridae
- Genus: Gymnodoris
- Species: G. subflava

Binomial name
- Gymnodoris subflava Baba, 1949

= Gymnodoris subflava =

Species of gastropod

Gymnodoris subflava is a species of colorful sea slug, a nudibranch, a marine gastropod mollusk in the family Polyceridae.

== Description ==
Gymnodoris subflava is a small size sea slug, it can reach a maximum size of 2,5 cm in length. Its stretched body is characterized by its bright yellow body color letting appear through its flanks the dark mass of its viscera especially close to the branchial plume. Its rhinophores and gills are contractile.

== Distribution ==
Gymnodoris subflava is found in the central area of the Indo-Pacific, from south Japan, to the eastern part of Indonesia via Philippines.

== Biology ==
Gymnodoris subflava is a carnivorous slug, its diet consists in feeding on other specific species of sea slugs and their eggs.
