= Plocamopherus lemur =

Scientific classification
- Kingdom: Animalia
- Phylum: Mollusca
- Class: Gastropoda
- Order: Nudibranchia
- Family: Polyceridae
- Genus: Plocamopherus
- Species: P. lemur

Binomial name
- Plocamopherus lemur Vallès & Gosliner, 2006

Species of gastropod

Plocamopherus lemur is a species of sea slug, a nudibranch, a shell-less marine gastropod mollusk in the family Polyceridae.

== Description ==
The body shape is elongate, limaciform and anteriorly rounded. The oral veil has 18 ramified appendages that differ in length. The oral tentacles are flat. Plocamopherus lemur has a brownish background color heavily speckled all over the body with minute brown dots, and minute orange dots that are clustered to form orange patches. White pigment is present in front of the branchial leaves, around the lateral appendages, at the base of the rhinophores and along the crest. This white coloration is situated on the notum along a non-continuous line at the margin of both sides of the animal and joining behind the branchial leaves. White pigment is also present along the margin of the sides of the body, the oral veil, tips of branchiae and clavus of the rhinophores. At the peduncle, the rhinophores are translucent and the clavus is translucent with a white apex. The rhinophoral sheath is short with clusters of orange dots. There are three pairs of lateral appendages, with only the last pair forming a rounded, brown, and prominent globular structure. All lateral appendages are conical having a short but highly ramified prolongation at the apex. The first two lateral appendages are very short and the last pair is very elongate. Six to eight small tubercles are present at each side of the animal. There are three principal tripinnate branchial leaves. The posterior portion of the foot forms a well-developed but short keel that is fringed on its upper margin.

== Distribution ==
This species was described from Madagascar. It has also been reported from the Seychelles and Aldabra.
