= Plocamopherus fulgurans =

Scientific classification
- Kingdom: Animalia
- Phylum: Mollusca
- Class: Gastropoda
- Order: Nudibranchia
- Family: Polyceridae
- Genus: Plocamopherus
- Species: P. fulgurans

Binomial name
- Plocamopherus fulgurans Risbec, 1928

Species of gastropod

Plocamopherus fulgurans is a species of sea slug, a nudibranch, a shell-less marine gastropod mollusk in the family Polyceridae.

== Distribution ==
This species was described from New Caledonia It has been reported from New Caledonia in 2010.
