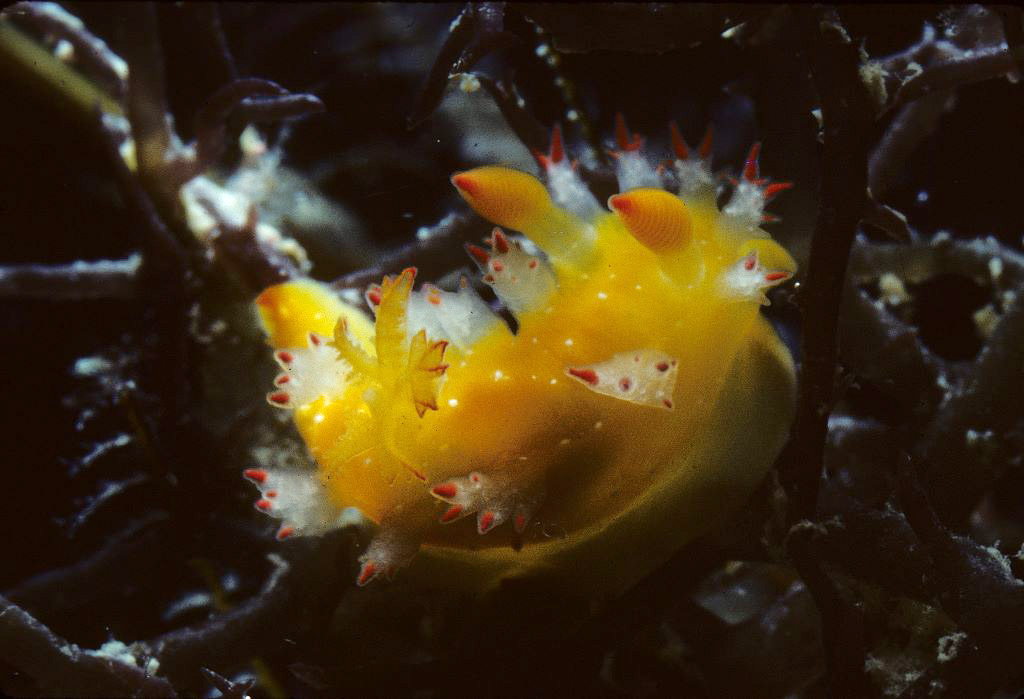
- Kaloplocamus acutus, Hong Kong

Scientific classification
- Kingdom: Animalia
- Phylum: Mollusca
- Class: Gastropoda
- Order: Nudibranchia
- Family: Polyceridae
- Genus: Kaloplocamus
- Species: K. acutus

Binomial name
- Kaloplocamus acutus (Baba, 1949)

= Kaloplocamus acutus =

Species of gastropod

Kaloplocamus acutus is a species of sea slug, a nudibranch, a shell-less marine gastropod mollusc in the family Polyceridae.

== Distribution ==
This species was described from Japan where it is a moderately common animal. It has also been reported from Hong Kong, Eastern Australia and New Caledonia,.
