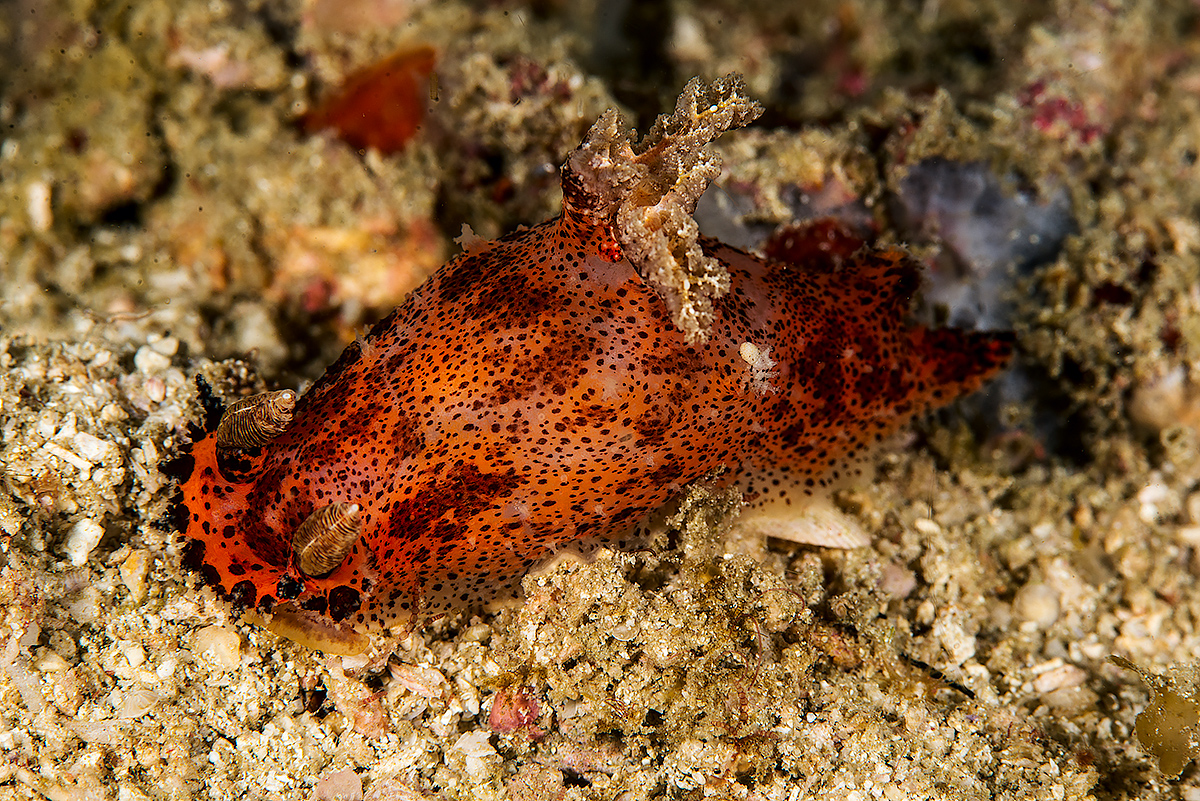
- The nudibranch Plocamopherus tilesii, Rinca, Indonesia.

Scientific classification
- Kingdom: Animalia
- Phylum: Mollusca
- Class: Gastropoda
- Order: Nudibranchia
- Family: Polyceridae
- Genus: Plocamopherus
- Species: P. tilesii

Binomial name
- Plocamopherus tilesii Bergh, 1877

= Plocamopherus tilesii =

Species of gastropod

Plocamopherus tilesii is a species of sea slug, a nudibranch, a shell-less marine gastropod mollusk in the family Polyceridae.

== Distribution ==
This species occurs in the Pacific Ocean, from Japan south to Australia.
