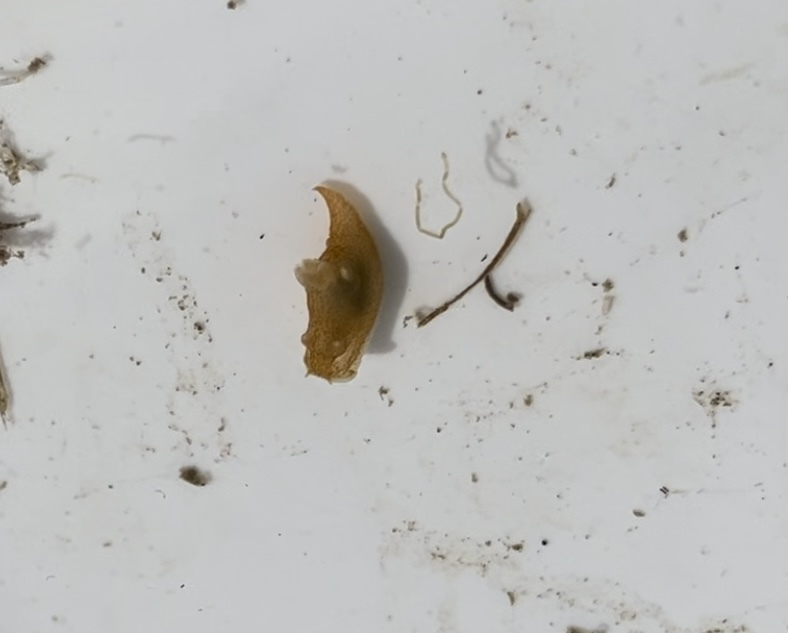

Scientific classification
- Kingdom: Animalia
- Phylum: Mollusca
- Class: Gastropoda
- Order: Nudibranchia
- Family: Polyceridae
- Genus: Gymnodoris
- Species: G. arnoldi

Binomial name
- Gymnodoris arnoldi Burn, 1957

= Gymnodoris arnoldi =

Species of gastropod

Gymnodoris arnoldi is a species of colourful sea slug, a dorid nudibranch, a marine gastropod mollusk in the family Polyceridae. It was first described in 1957.

== Distribution ==
This species is known from southeastern Australia.

== Description ==
Gymnodoris arnoldi has an orange-red body with translucent white rhinophores.

== Ecology ==
This species eats colonial ascidians.
