= Kalinga =

Kalinga may refer to:

== Geography, linguistics and/or ethnology ==
- Kalinga (region), a historical region of India
  - Kalinga (Mahabharata), an apocryphal kingdom mentioned in classical Indian literature
  - Kalinga script, an ancient writing system invented in the ancient Kingdom of Kalinga
  - Kalinga architecture
  - Kalingi, an Indian caste found between the districts of Ganjam and Vizagapatam
  - Kalinga War, fought c. 262 BCE between the Maurya Empire under Ashoka and the state of Kalinga
- Kalinga people, an ethnic group in the Philippines
  - Kalinga language, spoken in the Philippines
  - Kalinga-Apayao, a former province in the Philippines
  - Kalinga (province), in the Philippines
- Kalinga, Queensland, a suburb of Brisbane, Australia
  - Kalinga Park, a park in the same suburb
- Kalingga Kingdom, an ancient Indianized kingdom in Java

== Musical instruments ==
- Kalinga or galinga, a musical instrument known otherwise as the ground bow
- Kalinga, the sacred, dynastic drum of Rwanda, known elsewhere in Africa as Ngoma drums

== Others ==
- Kalinga (film), a 2006 Tamil-language film from India
- Kalinga (gastropod), a genus of sea slugs
- Kalinga Airlines, a private airline based in Calcutta
- Kalinga Prize, a UNESCO prize awarded for the popularisation of science
- Kalinga Stadium, Bhubaneswar, Odisha, India
- 26214 Kalinga, an asteroid
- INS Kalinga, an Indian Navy establishment at Visakhapatnam
- P. Kalinga Rao (1914–1981), an Indian singer

== See also ==
- Keling, derogatory term for Indians in Southeast Asia, derived from the name of the ancient Indian region
- Kaalinga, a 1980 Indian Kannada-language film by V. Somashekhar
- Kaalingar, a medieval Indian literary scholar of the Tamil language
- Kaling Moyong, an Indian politician
- Mindy Kaling (born 1979), an Indian-American actress, comedian, and writer
  - Kaling International, a film and television production company founded by her
