= Plocamopherus pilatectus =

Scientific classification
- Domain: Eukaryota
- Kingdom: Animalia
- Phylum: Mollusca
- Class: Gastropoda
- Order: Nudibranchia
- Superfamily: Polyceroidea
- Family: Polyceridae
- Genus: Plocamopherus
- Species: P. pilatectus

Binomial name
- Plocamopherus pilatectus Hamann & Farmer, 1988

Species of gastropod

Plocamopherus pilatectus is a species of sea slug, a nudibranch, a shell-less marine gastropod mollusk in the family Polyceridae.

== Distribution ==
This species was described from the Grenadines. It has subsequently been reported from nearby islands in the Caribbean Sea.
