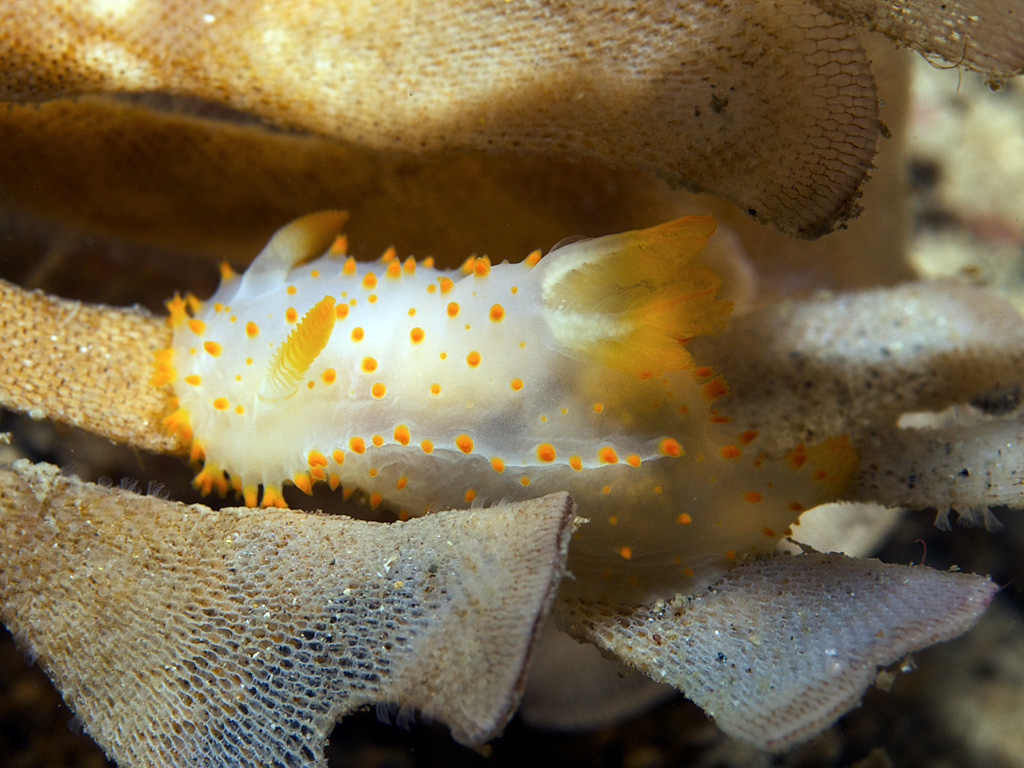
- Rathlin Island, Northern Ireland, UK.

Scientific classification
- Kingdom: Animalia
- Phylum: Mollusca
- Class: Gastropoda
- Order: Nudibranchia
- Family: Polyceridae
- Genus: Crimora
- Species: C. papillata

Binomial name
- Crimora papillata Alder & Hancock, 1862

= Crimora papillata =

Species of gastropod

Crimora papillata is a species of sea slug, a nudibranch, a shell-less marine gastropod mollusc in the family Polyceridae.

== Distribution ==
This species was described from Moulin Huet Bay, Guernsey, Channel Isles, English Channel. It is found from Western Scotland to Portugal and in Morocco and the Mediterranean Sea.
