= Peludo =

Peludo or El Peludo may refer to:

- Peludos, a group of boys in the television series TV Colosso
- El Peludo, a character created by Argentine animation director and cartoonist Quirino Cristiani
  - Hipólito Yrigoyen, the political leader that Cristiani satirized as El Peludo
  - Peludópolis, a film directed by Cristiani
- El Peludo, the nickname of Mexican outlaw and folk hero Augustine Chacon
- El Peludo, a character from the Mexican telenovela Rosario Tijeras
- El Peludo, a character from the Colombian film Sumas y restas
- Kaloplocamus peludo, a type of sea slug
- tatu peludo, Portuguese name for the six-banded armadillo

== See also ==
- Rancho Peludo, a prehistoric art style in Venezuela
- Cerro de los Peludos, a hill in Rivera Department in Uruguay
