= Plocamopherus margaretae =

Scientific classification
- Kingdom: Animalia
- Phylum: Mollusca
- Class: Gastropoda
- Order: Nudibranchia
- Family: Polyceridae
- Genus: Plocamopherus
- Species: P. margaretae

Binomial name
- Plocamopherus margaretae Vallès & Gosliner, 2006

Species of gastropod

Plocamopherus margaretae is a species of sea slug, a nudibranch, a shell-less marine gastropod mollusk in the family Polyceridae.

== Description ==
"In life, the body shape is elongate and anteriorly rounded. The oral veil is wide, flattened and fringed. The oral tentacles are flat. Plocamopherus margaretae has a pink or red background color heavily speckled all over the body with large white spots and black, almost oval spots. The white spots are of various sizes and are regularly scattered on the notum. The black spots appear always surrounded by white, and are much fewer than the white spots. A yellow-orange line runs along the margin of the foot, the margin of the oral veil and the margin of the keel. The rhinophores are yellow-pink for their whole length. At the tip of the clavus there is a short white line. The rhinophoral sheath is the same background color as the body and is short with its margin lined by white and yellow pigment. There are three pairs of lateral appendages, which are rounded and form prominent globular structures. These globular structures are much larger in the posterior most pair of appendages. The anterior pairs are very short and rounded. All are pink-yellowish in color. There are three tripinnate branchial leaves that each insert separately into the dorsum. The posterior portion of the foot forms a well-developed elongated keel that is slightly fringed in its upper margin."

== Distribution ==
This species was described from Myanmar. It has also been reported from Dubai.
