= Crimora edwardsi =

Scientific classification
- Kingdom: Animalia
- Phylum: Mollusca
- Class: Gastropoda
- Order: Nudibranchia
- Family: Polyceridae
- Genus: Crimora
- Species: C. edwardsi

Binomial name
- Crimora edwardsi (Angas, 1864)

Synonyms
- Angasiella edwardsi Angas, 1864; Nembrotha edwardsi (Angas, 1864)

Species of nudibranch in the family Polyceridae

Crimora edwardsi is a species of colourful sea slug, a dorid nudibranch, a marine gastropod mollusk in the family Polyceridae.

== Distribution ==
This species was described from Port Jackson, New South Wales, Australia.

== Description ==
The illustration of Angas appears to show a species of Crimora, not Nembrotha. O'Donoghue (1924) did not replace the name Nembrotha with Angasiella because he did not believe this species belonged to Nembrotha. It has been rediscovered in southern Queensland.
