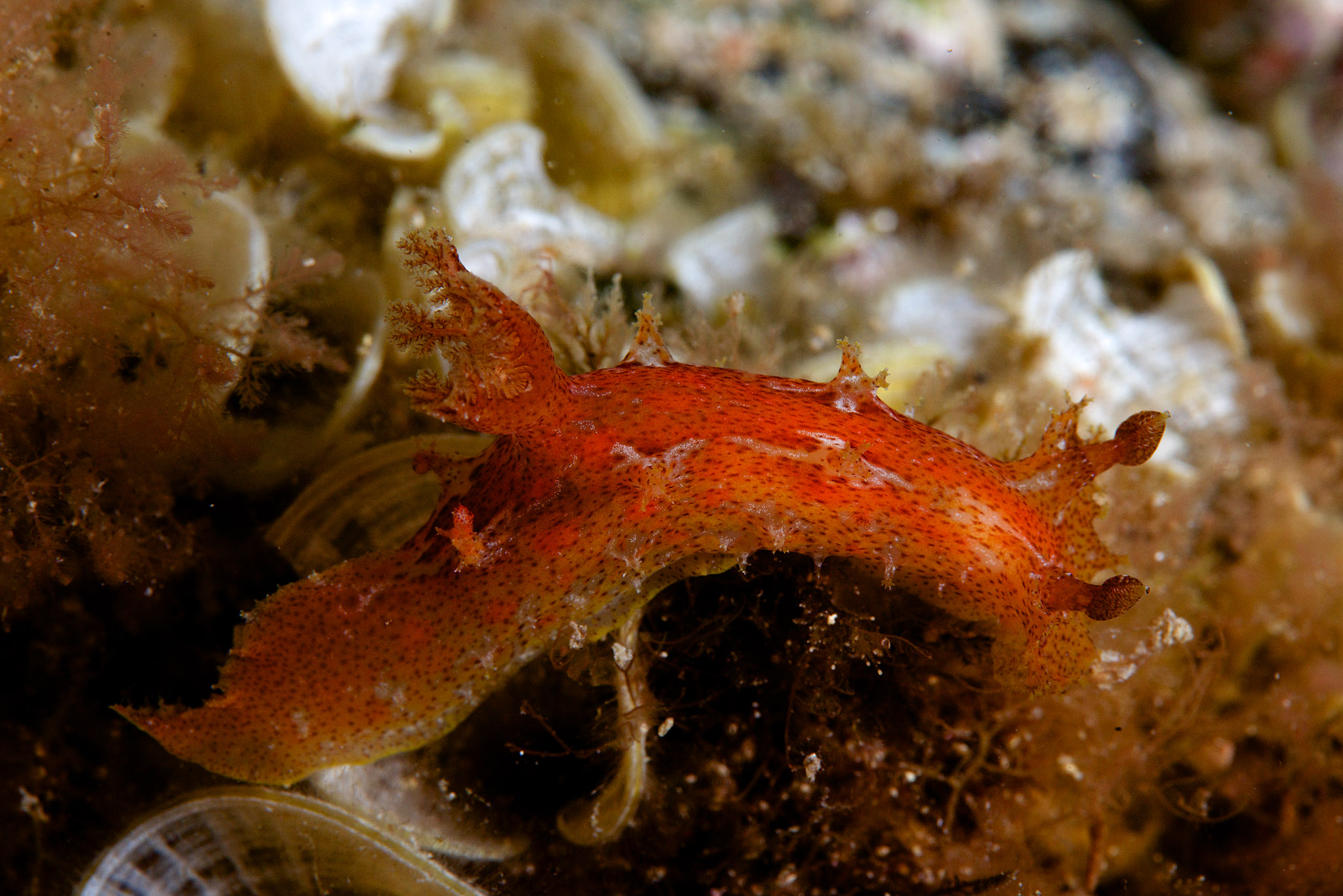
- Costa Teguise, Lanzarote.

Scientific classification
- Kingdom: Animalia
- Phylum: Mollusca
- Class: Gastropoda
- Order: Nudibranchia
- Superfamily: Polyceroidea
- Family: Polyceridae
- Genus: Plocamopherus
- Species: P. maderae

Binomial name
- Plocamopherus maderae (Lowe, 1842)

= Plocamopherus maderae =

Species of gastropod

Plocamopherus maderae is a species of sea slug, a nudibranch, a shell-less marine gastropod mollusk in the family Polyceridae.

== Description ==
This nudibranch is orange or yellow-orange in colour, with numerous small dark brown spots and fewer, larger, poorly defined, orange spots and patches. The mantle edge has three pairs of branched papillae, one behind the branchial plume, one in front and one mid-way along the back. These are marked with white pigment and there is a variable amount of white pigment along the mantle edge and behind the gills. The papillae behind the branchial plume bear rounded bioluminescent organs. The tail is long, flattened and has a dorsal crest. It is muscular and can be used for swimming. The gills are large, sparsely branched and held erect. The rhinophores have lamellate tips and a tapering stalk and are similar in colour to the body. Maximum size is about 50 mm. This nudibranch is normally nocturnal, hiding beneath boulders in shallow water during daytime.

== Distribution ==
This species was described from Madeira. It has subsequently been reported from the Canary Islands and the Cape Verde Islands.
