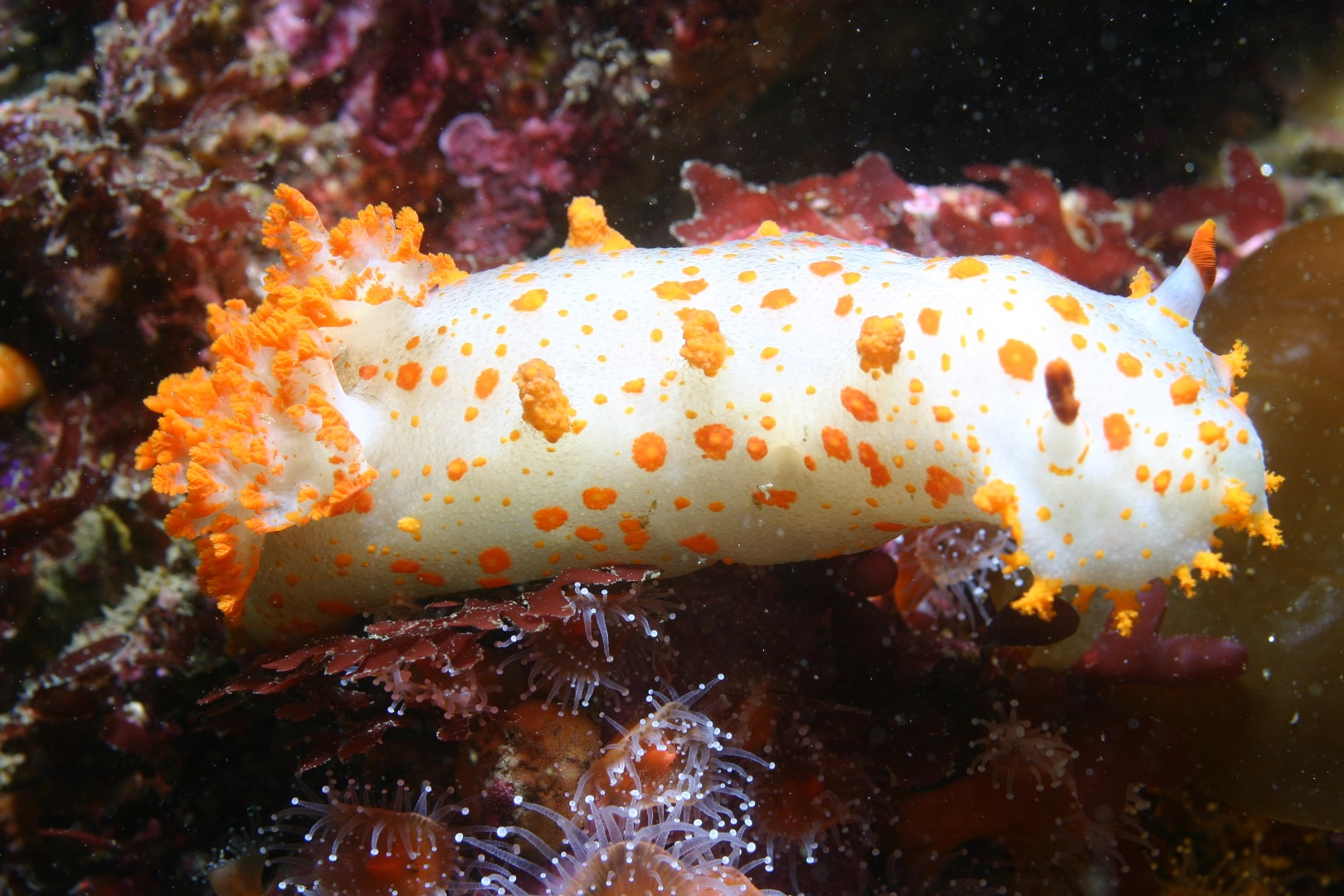

Scientific classification
- Kingdom: Animalia
- Phylum: Mollusca
- Class: Gastropoda
- Order: Nudibranchia
- Family: Polyceridae
- Genus: Triopha
- Species: T. catalinae

Binomial name
- Triopha catalinae (Cooper, 1863)

= Triopha catalinae =

Sea clown triopha

Species of gastropod

Triopha catalinae, commonly known as the sea clown triopha or sea clown, is a species of colorful sea slug called a nudibranch. Sea clowns are a shell-less marine, gastronomic mollusk in the taxonomic family Polyceridae.

The species' Latin name is named after Santa Catalina Island, California.

== Distribution ==
This species lives in the Western Pacific from Alaska to Mexico, and has also been found in Japan and South Korea.

== Life habits ==
This nudibranch grazes on bryozoans.

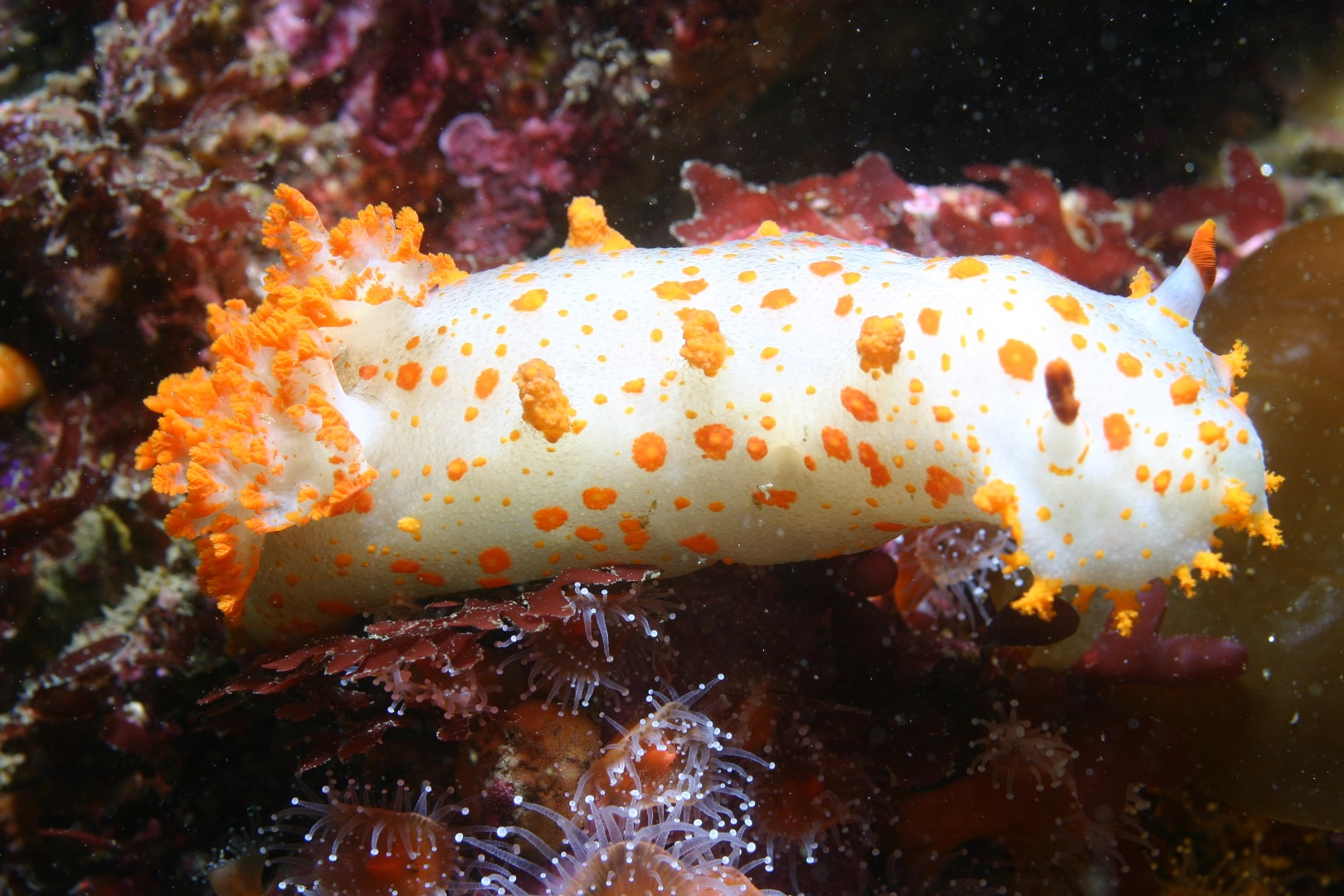
Triopha catalinae

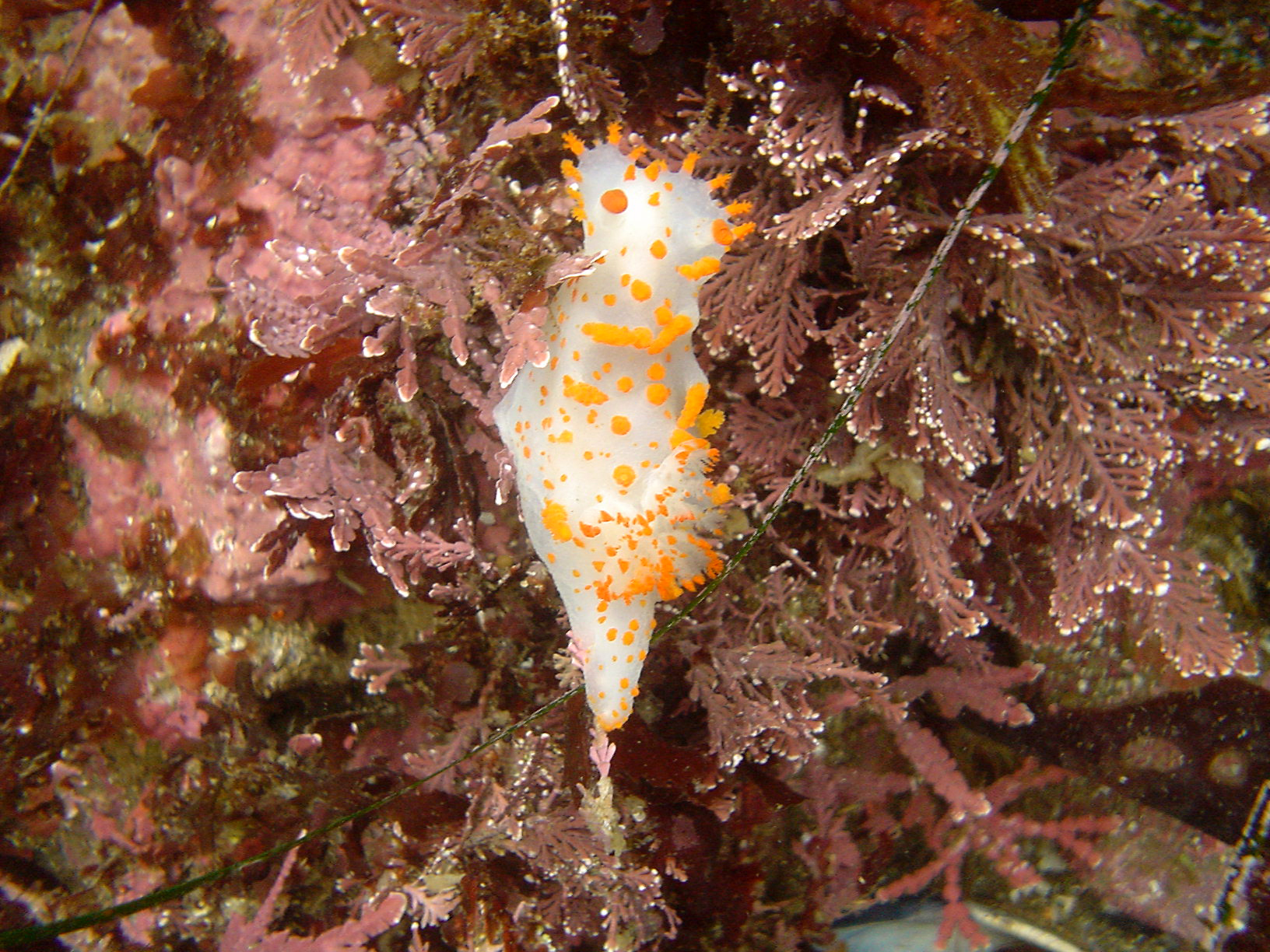
Triopha catalinae on red coralline algae in a tide pool in Central California
