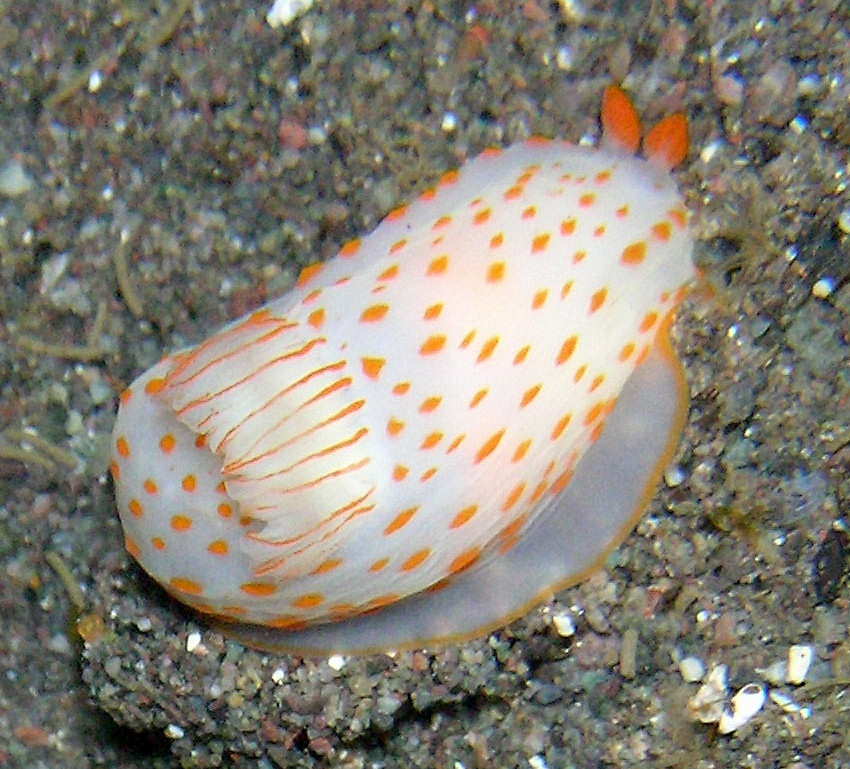

Scientific classification
- Domain: Eukaryota
- Kingdom: Animalia
- Phylum: Mollusca
- Class: Gastropoda
- Order: Nudibranchia
- Superfamily: Polyceroidea
- Family: Polyceridae
- Genus: Gymnodoris
- Species: G. ceylonica

Binomial name
- Gymnodoris ceylonica (Kelaart, 1858)

Synonyms
- Trevelyana ceylonica Kelaart, 1858 (basionym)

= Gymnodoris ceylonica =

Species of gastropod

Gymnodoris ceylonica is a species of sea slug, a dorid nudibranch, a marine gastropod mollusk in the family Polyceridae.

== Distribution ==
This species occurs in the tropical Indo-Pacific Ocean.

== Description ==
Gymnodoris ceylonica has a translucent white body which is covered with many orange spots. It has translucent orange-lined white gills and orange rhinophores. The foot is translucent white and edged with an orange margin.
