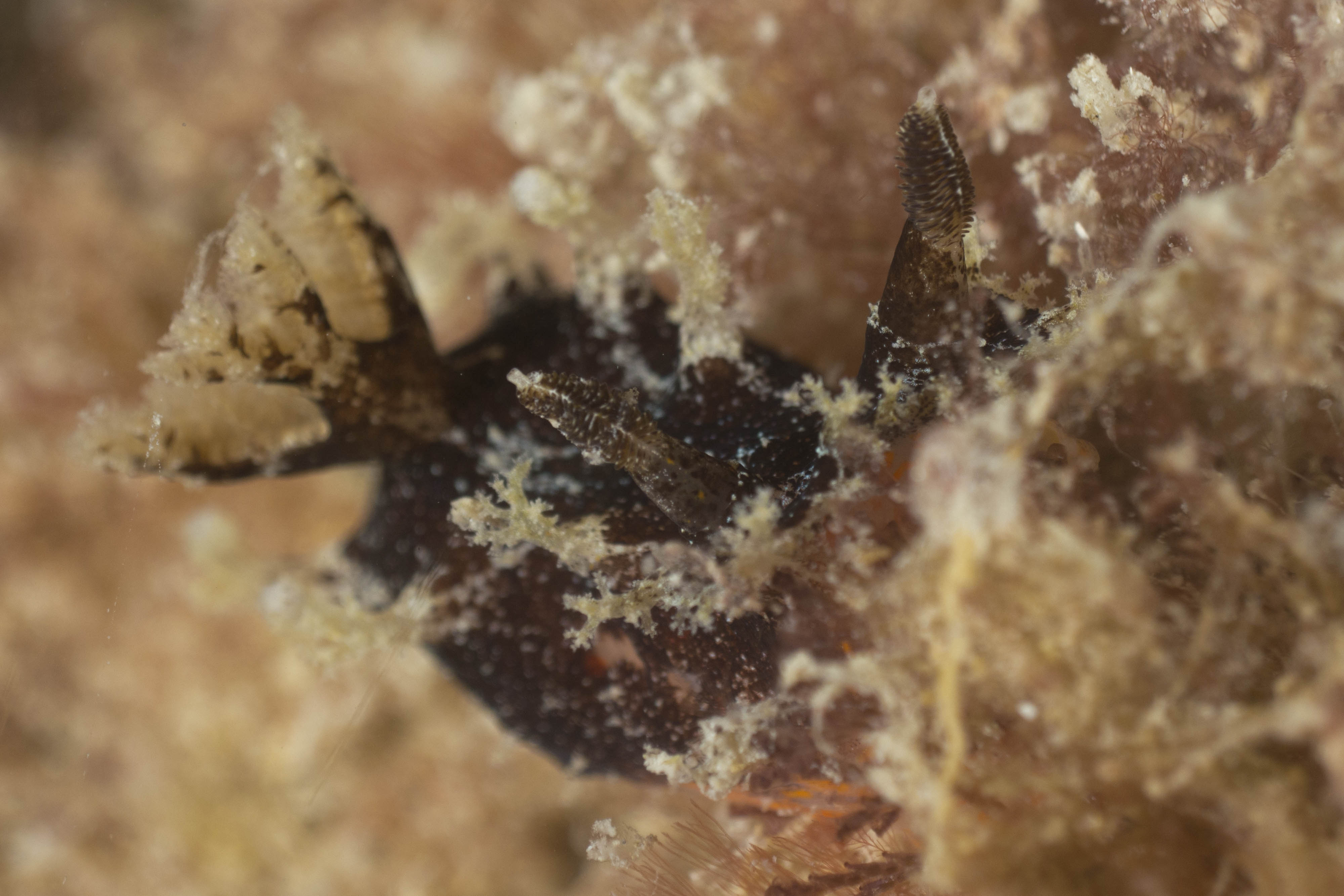

Scientific classification
- Domain: Eukaryota
- Kingdom: Animalia
- Phylum: Mollusca
- Class: Gastropoda
- Order: Nudibranchia
- Superfamily: Polyceroidea
- Family: Polyceridae
- Genus: Plocamopherus
- Species: P. ceylonicus

Binomial name
- Plocamopherus ceylonicus (Kelaart, 1858)

= Plocamopherus ceylonicus =

Species of gastropod

Plocamopherus ceylonicus is a species of sea slug, a nudibranch, a shell-less marine gastropod mollusk in the family Polyceridae.

== Distribution ==
This species was originally described from Sri Lanka.
