= Kankelibranchus incognitus =

Scientific classification
- Domain: Eukaryota
- Kingdom: Animalia
- Phylum: Mollusca
- Class: Gastropoda
- Order: Nudibranchia
- Superfamily: Polyceroidea
- Family: Polyceridae
- Genus: Kankelibranchus
- Species: K. incognitus

Binomial name
- Kankelibranchus incognitus Ortea, Espinosa & Caballer, 2005

Synonyms
- Polycera incognita (Ortea, Espinosa & Caballer, 2005)

Species of gastropod

Kankelibranchus incognitus is a species of sea slug, a nudibranch, a shell-less marine gastropod mollusc in the family Polyceridae.

== Distribution ==
This species was described from Cuba.

== Description ==
The living animals are of a striking orange colour with small black dots all over the body, sometimes grouped in small patches in front of the gills. The gills, papillae and all of the elevated structures of the body are pale yellow. There are long branched processes on the oral veil, in addition to simple papilla. On the flanks and below the rim of the mantle there are also branched processes and buds of unequal sizes, with the largest reaching the height of the gills; these branched processes continue on the tail and on the sides of the body. The rhinophores are orange, with the stem and the lamellae of rugged aspect and an apical mucron very apparent, with up to 12 lamellae in the 7 mm animal. Eyes located well behind the rhinophores. Gills formed by five unipinnate leaves of a pale yellow colour; the anus is situated posterior to the gill. Genital opening on the right side, to the height of the anterior third of the body. Anterior edge of the foot bilabiate, with the angles rounded. Sole of the foot yellowish, with a tiny black dot.
