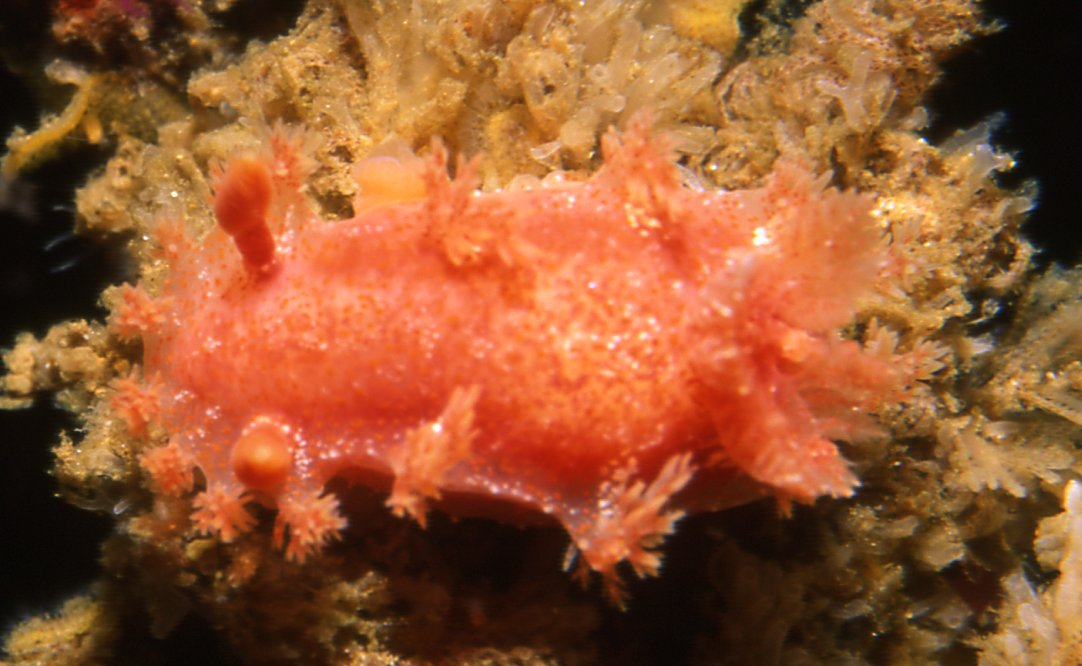
- A live individual of Kaloplocamus ramosus, head end towards the left

Scientific classification
- Kingdom: Animalia
- Phylum: Mollusca
- Class: Gastropoda
- Order: Nudibranchia
- Family: Polyceridae
- Genus: Kaloplocamus
- Species: K. ramosus

Binomial name
- Kaloplocamus ramosus (Cantraine, 1835)

Synonyms
- Doris fimbriata Delle Chiaje, 1841; Doris ramosa Cantraine, 1835; Euplocamus atlanticus Bergh, 1892; Euplocamus croceus R. A. Philippi, 1836; Euplocamus frondosus R. A. Philippi, 1839; Kaloplocamus atlanticus (Bergh, 1892); Kaloplocamus aureus Odhner, 1932; Kaloplocamus filosus Cattaneo-Vietti & Sordi, 1988

= Kaloplocamus ramosus =

Species of gastropod

Kaloplocamus ramosus, the tasselled nudibranch, is a species of sea slug, a dorid nudibranch, and a marine gastropod mollusc in the family Polyceridae.

== Distribution ==
This species was described from the Mediterranean Sea. It has subsequently been reported from south-eastern Australia and Japan, Hong Kong and Korea. It is also found off the South African coast, where it occurs from Hout Bay on the Cape Peninsula to the Wild Coast. It lives at depths from 25–400 m.

== Description ==
The length of the species attains 100 mm.

The tasselled nudibranch is very well-camouflaged; it usually cannot be noticed underwater without using a torch. The body is pale with variable amounts of reddish-pink pigmentation and is covered with raised white spots. Numerous branched projections on the notum aid in camouflage, and may be extended or retracted. This nudibranch has large perfoliate rhinophores, which are usually pinkish in color. The gills are spotted with red pigmentation.

== Distinguishing features ==
The body is a distinct orange color with brighter orange speckles and may feature scattered, raised white spots. It has a soft texture with numerous branched lateral projections, which become more prominent when viewed underwater.

The body is pale orange with brighter orange speckles and scattered raised white spots.
