= Kaloplocamus gulo =

Scientific classification
- Kingdom: Animalia
- Phylum: Mollusca
- Class: Gastropoda
- Order: Nudibranchia
- Family: Polyceridae
- Genus: Kaloplocamus
- Species: K. gulo

Binomial name
- Kaloplocamus gulo (Ev. Marcus, 1979)

Species of gastropod

Kaloplocamus gulo is a species of sea slug, a nudibranch, a shell-less marine gastropod mollusc in the family Polyceridae.

== Distribution ==
This species was described from a depth of 100 metres off São Paulo, Brazil as a species of Plocamopherus. It was transferred to the genus Kaloplocamus in 1988 as it lacks the club-like extra-branchial appendages characteristic of Plocamopherus species.
