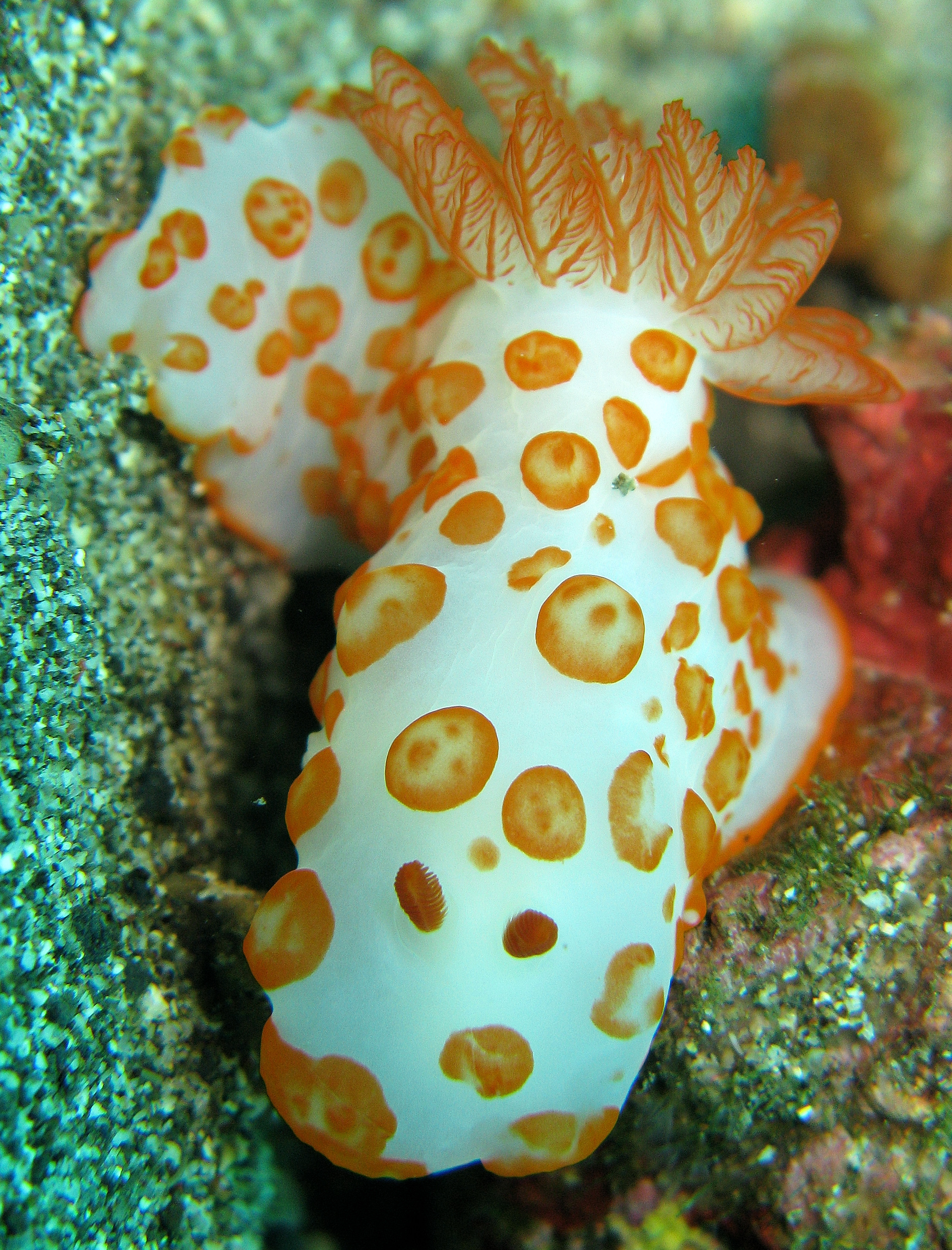
- Gymnodoris impudica in Lembeh, 2009

Scientific classification
- Kingdom: Animalia
- Phylum: Mollusca
- Class: Gastropoda
- Order: Nudibranchia
- Family: Polyceridae
- Genus: Gymnodoris
- Species: G. impudica

Binomial name
- Gymnodoris impudica (Rüppell & Leuckart, 1830)

Synonyms
- Gymnodoris impudica (Rüppell & Leuckart, 1828); Trevelyana rubropapulosa Bergh, 1905 (basionym)

= Gymnodoris impudica =

Species of gastropod

Gymnodoris impudica is a species of colourful sea slug, a dorid nudibranch, a marine gastropod mollusk in the family Polyceridae. It was first described in 1828.

== Distribution ==
This species is known from the tropical Indo-Pacific Ocean.

== Description ==
Gymnodoris impudica is a large dorid nudibranch up to 60 mm in length. It has a white body covered with many orange spots, an orange mantle-edge and orange-lined rhinophores.
