= Crimora multidigitalis =

Scientific classification
- Kingdom: Animalia
- Phylum: Mollusca
- Class: Gastropoda
- Order: Nudibranchia
- Family: Polyceridae
- Genus: Crimora
- Species: C. multidigitalis

Binomial name
- Crimora multidigitalis (Burn, 1957)

Species of gastropod

Crimora multidigitalis is a species of sea slug, a nudibranch, a shell-less marine gastropod mollusc in the family Polyceridae.

== Distribution ==
This species was described from Point Danger, Torquay, Victoria, Australia. It has subsequently been reported from Queensland, New South Wales and Tasmania in depths of 0 – 55 metres. It has also been found at the Poor Knights Islands, New Zealand.
