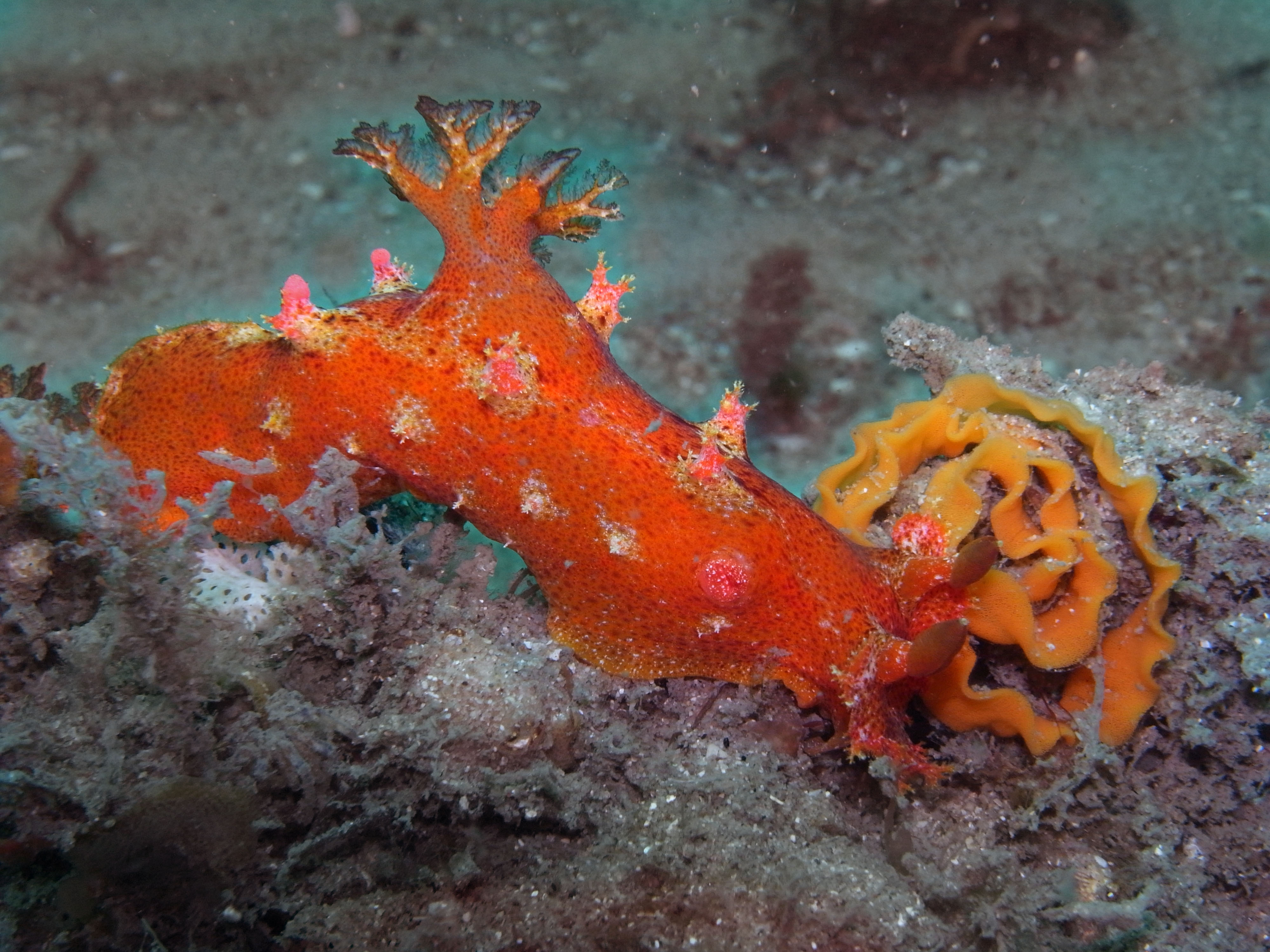

Scientific classification
- Domain: Eukaryota
- Kingdom: Animalia
- Phylum: Mollusca
- Class: Gastropoda
- Order: Nudibranchia
- Superfamily: Polyceroidea
- Family: Polyceridae
- Genus: Plocamopherus
- Species: P. imperialis

Binomial name
- Plocamopherus imperialis Angas, 1864

= Plocamopherus imperialis =

Species of gastropod

Plocamopherus imperialis is a species of sea slug, a nudibranch, a shell-less marine gastropod mollusk in the family Polyceridae.

== Distribution ==
This species was described from Port Jackson, S.E. Australia.
