= Crimora lutea =

Scientific classification
- Kingdom: Animalia
- Phylum: Mollusca
- Class: Gastropoda
- Order: Nudibranchia
- Family: Polyceridae
- Genus: Crimora
- Species: C. lutea

Binomial name
- Crimora lutea Baba, 1949

Species of gastropod

Crimora lutea is a species of sea slug, a nudibranch, a shell-less marine gastropod mollusc in the family Polyceridae.

== Distribution ==
This species was described from Japan. It has subsequently been reported from Western Australia, New South Wales and Tasmania, Australia and Hawaii.
