= Paliolla =

Scientific classification
- Kingdom: Animalia
- Phylum: Mollusca
- Class: Gastropoda
- Order: Nudibranchia
- Family: Polyceridae
- Subfamily: Polycerinae
- Genus: Paliolla; Burn, 1958

Synonyms
- Esuriospinax Ortea, 1989

Genus of gastropods

Paliolla is a genus of sea slugs, dorid nudibranchs, shell-less marine gastropod molluscs in the family Polyceridae.

== Species ==
Species in the genus Paliolla include:

- Paliolla cooki (Angas, 1864)
- Paliolla templadoi (Ortea, 1989)
