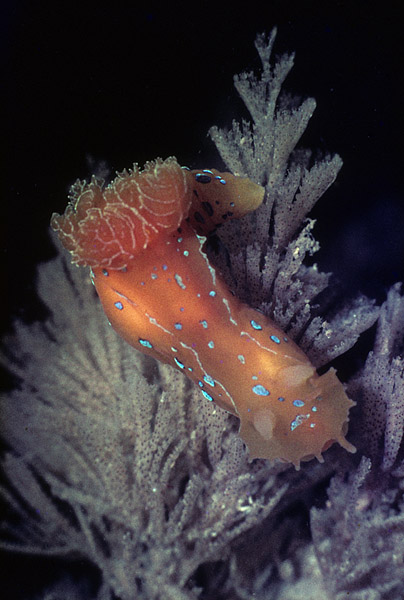
- The nudibranch sea slug Greilada elegans on a bryozoan in Skomer Marine Nature Reserve, Wales, UK

Scientific classification
- Kingdom: Animalia
- Phylum: Mollusca
- Class: Gastropoda
- Order: Nudibranchia
- Family: Polyceridae
- Subfamily: Polycerinae
- Genus: Greilada; Bergh, 1894

= Greilada =

Genus of gastropods

Greilada is a genus of sea slugs, dorid nudibranchs, shell-less marine gastropod molluscs in the family Polyceridae.

== Species ==
Species in the genus Greilada include:

- Greilada elegans Bergh, 1894
