= Holoplocamus =

Scientific classification
- Kingdom: Animalia
- Phylum: Mollusca
- Class: Gastropoda
- Order: Nudibranchia
- Family: Polyceridae
- Subfamily: Triophinae
- Genus: Holoplocamus; Odhner, 1926

Genus of gastropods

Holoplocamus is a genus of sea slugs, specifically nudibranchs, shell-less marine gastropod molluscs in the family Polyceridae.

== Species ==
Species in the genus Holoplocamus include:

- Holoplocamus papposus Odhner, 1926
