= Polycerella =

Scientific classification
- Kingdom: Animalia
- Phylum: Mollusca
- Class: Gastropoda
- Order: Nudibranchia
- Family: Polyceridae
- Subfamily: Polycerinae
- Genus: Polycerella; A. E. Verrill, 1881:

Genus of gastropods

Polycerella is a genus of sea slugs, dorid nudibranchs, shell-less marine gastropod mollusks in the family Polyceridae.

== Species ==
Species in the genus Polycerella include:

- Polycerella conyna E. Marcus, 1957
- Polycerella davenportii
- Polycerella emertoni A. E. Verrill, 1881
- Polycerella glandulosa Behrens and Gosliner, 1988
