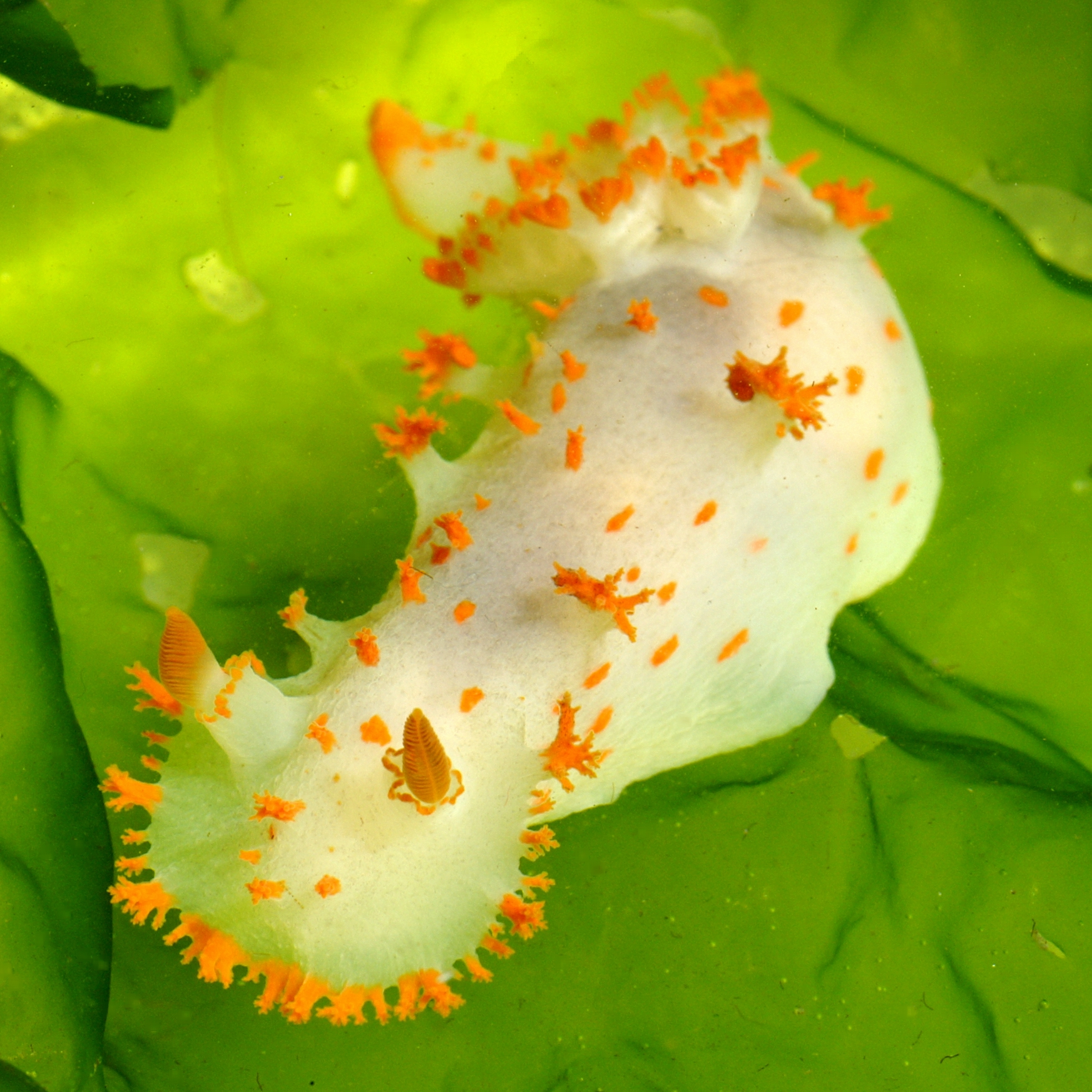

Scientific classification
- Kingdom: Animalia
- Phylum: Mollusca
- Class: Gastropoda
- Order: Nudibranchia
- Family: Polyceridae
- Genus: Triopha
- Species: T. modesta

Binomial name
- Triopha modesta Bergh (1880)

= Triopha modesta =

Species of nudibranch

Triopha modesta, commonly known as the modest clown dorid, is a colorful species of nudibranch sea slug. Modest clown dorids are a shellless marine, gastropod mollusk in the taxonomic family Polyceridae.

== Taxonomy ==
Considered as valid species by Martynov et al. (2015), misidentified previously as Triopha catalinae Cooper, 1863 (Martynov & Korshunova, 2011)

== Range ==
Modest clown dorids range from the Sea of Japan to southern California.
