= Heteroplocamus =

Scientific classification
- Domain: Eukaryota
- Kingdom: Animalia
- Phylum: Mollusca
- Class: Gastropoda
- Order: Nudibranchia
- Superfamily: Polyceroidea
- Family: Polyceridae
- Subfamily: Triophinae
- Genus: Heteroplocamus; Oliver, 1915

Genus of gastropods

Heteroplocamus is a monotypic genus of sea slugs, specifically nudibranchs, shell-less marine gastropod molluscs in the family Polyceridae.

== Species ==
Species in the genus Heteroplocamus include:

- Heteroplocamus pacifica (Bergh, 1868)
