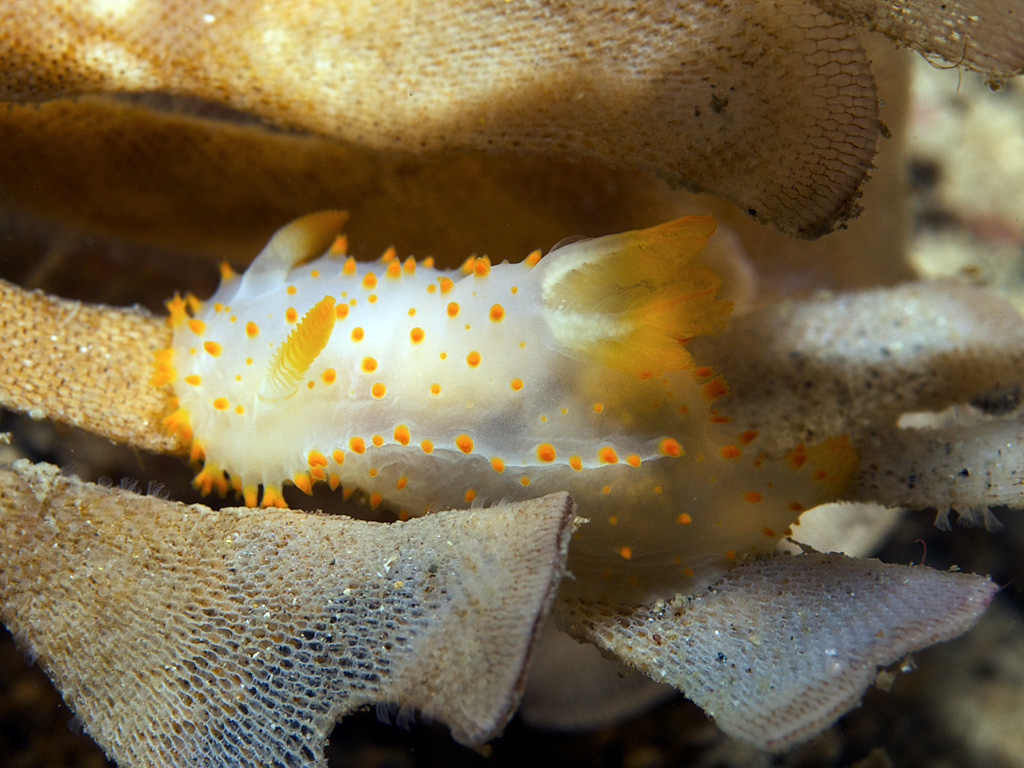
- Crimora papillata, type species of Crimora.

Scientific classification
- Kingdom: Animalia
- Phylum: Mollusca
- Class: Gastropoda
- Order: Nudibranchia
- Family: Polyceridae
- Subfamily: Triophinae
- Genus: Crimora; Alder and Hancock, 1855

= Crimora (gastropod) =

Genus of gastropods

Crimora is a genus of sea slugs, specifically nudibranchs, shell-less marine gastropod molluscs in the family Polyceridae.

== Species ==
Species in the genus Crimora include:

- Crimora coneja Er. Marcus, 1961 rabbit doris
- Crimora edwardsi (Angas, 1864)
- Crimora lutea Baba, 1949
- Crimora multidigitalis (Burn, 1957)
- Crimora papillata Alder and Hancock, 1862
