= Colga (gastropod) =

Scientific classification
- Kingdom: Animalia
- Phylum: Mollusca
- Class: Gastropoda
- Order: Nudibranchia
- Family: Polyceridae
- Subfamily: Triophinae
- Genus: Colga; Bergh, 1880

Synonyms
- Issa Bergh, 1881 (Unnecessary substitute name for Colga); Issena Iredale & O'Donoghue, 1923 (Nom. nov. pro Issa Bergh, 1881, non Walker, 1867)

Genus of gastropods

Colga is a genus of sea slugs, specifically nudibranchs, shell-less marine gastropod molluscs in the family Polyceridae.

== Species ==
Species in the genus Colga include:

- Colga minichevi Martynov & Baranets, 2002
- Colga pacifica (Bergh, 1894)
- Colga ramosa (Verrill & Emerton, 1881): synonym of Kaloplocamus verrilli Martynov, 2002
- Colga villosa (Odhner, 1907)
