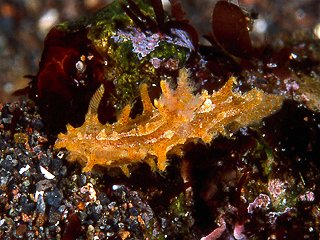

Scientific classification
- Kingdom: Animalia
- Phylum: Mollusca
- Class: Gastropoda
- Order: Nudibranchia
- Family: Polyceridae
- Genus: Kaloplocamus
- Species: K. peludo

Binomial name
- Kaloplocamus peludo Vallès & Gosliner, 2006

= Kaloplocamus peludo =

Species of gastropod

Kaloplocamus peludo is a species of sea slug, a nudibranch, a shell-less marine gastropod mollusc in the family Polyceridae.

== Description ==
The living animal has a general orange coloration. The whole dorsum has brown dots except at the apices of the lateral appendages, which are pale yellow. These brown dots are similar and size and regularly distributed. The dorsum has an opaque white, irregularly shaped line, which runs from the front of the head to the posterior end of the notum. This line bifurcates at the level of the branchial leaves, where it surrounds them and remerges again behind the branchial leaves. The posterior end of the foot is thin and acute and has a yellow color similar to that of the lateral appendage apices. Two types of appendages are observed in the specimen. The first type of appendages is the longest and widest. There are three pairs of these lateral appendages situated along the margin of the sides. These appendages have a ramified apex. Each ramification of the apex has a rounded base and a long, thin and sharp prolongation. The whole length of each of these appendages is covered by little and acute ramifications. The second type of appendages, are thin, long with many small sharp, thin and long simple ramifications. These appendages are present on the sides of the body, foot, dorsum and oral veil in number 15–17 per side with 6 on the oral veil. The rhinophores have a lamellate clavus and a peduncule with little, thin and sharp ramifications. Each rhinophoral sheath edge has three ramifications. The middle one is virtually identical to the lateral appendages. The other two ramifications are similar to the smaller tentacles of the rest of the body. The oral tentacles are simple folds of the mantle that have a cylindrical shape. There are three tripinnate branchial leaves. They present long, simple, and thin ramifications as the smaller appendages.

== Distribution ==
The type locality for this species is Batangas, Luzon Island, Philippines. In the original description it has also been reported from a wide area of the Indo-Pacific ocean from the Philippines, Papua New Guinea, Palau, Marshall Islands and Japan to Tanzania. It has subsequently been reported from Heron Island, Australia.
