= Kankelibranchus =

Scientific classification
- Domain: Eukaryota
- Kingdom: Animalia
- Phylum: Mollusca
- Class: Gastropoda
- Order: Nudibranchia
- Superfamily: Polyceroidea
- Family: Polyceridae
- Subfamily: Kankelibranchinae
- Genus: Kankelibranchus; Ortea, Espinosa & Caballer, 2005

Genus of gastropods

Kankelibranchus is a genus of sea slugs, specifically nudibranchs, shell-less marine gastropod molluscs in the family Polyceridae.

== Species ==
Species in the genus Kankelibranchus include:

- Kankelibranchus alhenae Ortea, Espinosa & Moro, 2009
- Kankelibranchus incognitus Ortea, Espinosa & Caballer, 2005
