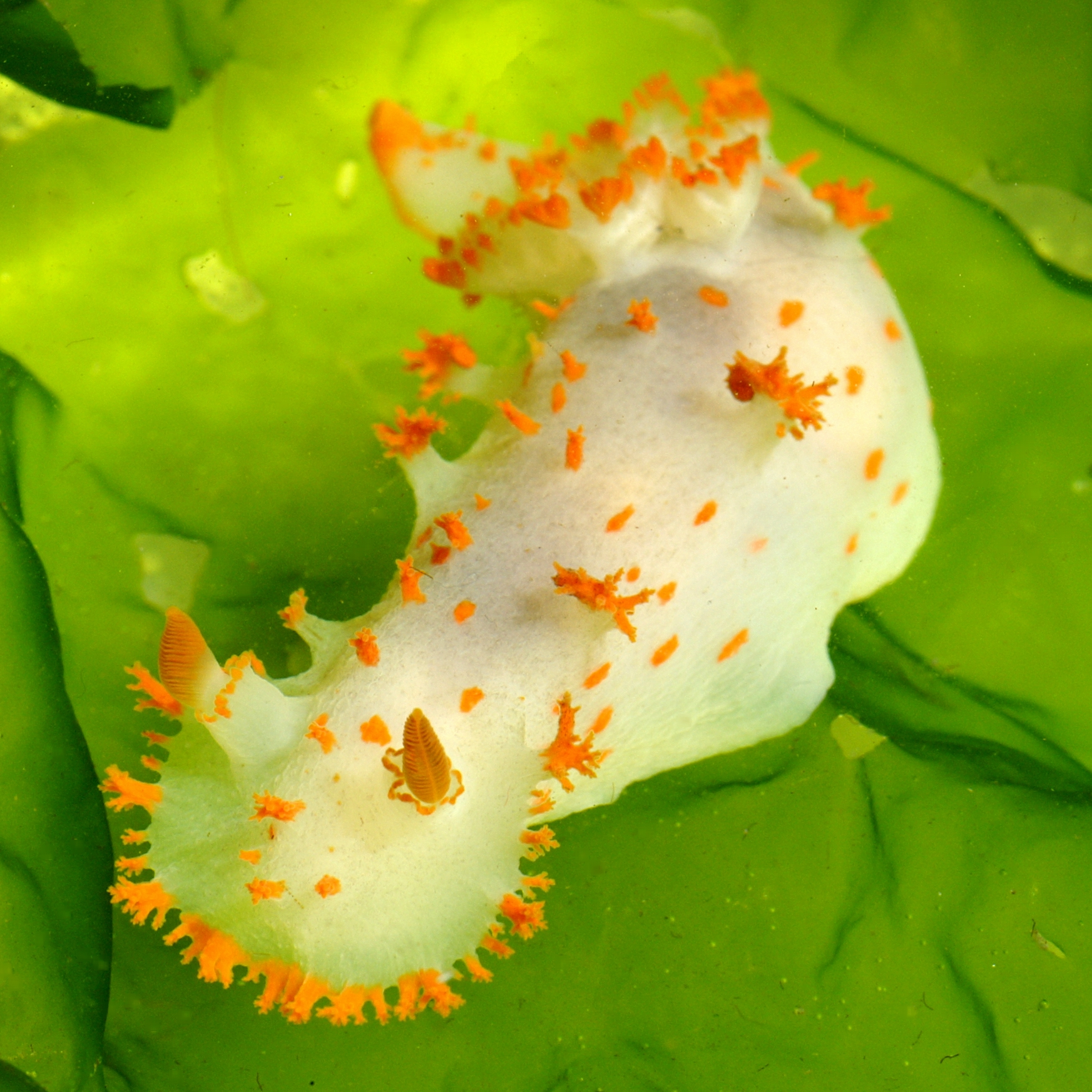
- A live individual of Triopha modesta, in situ, head end towards the lower left

Scientific classification
- Kingdom: Animalia
- Phylum: Mollusca
- Class: Gastropoda
- Order: Nudibranchia
- Family: Polyceridae
- Subfamily: Triophinae
- Genus: Triopha; Bergh, 1880

= Triopha =

Genus of gastropods

Triopha is a genus of colorful sea slugs, nudibranchs, shell-less marine gastropod mollusks in the family Polyceridae.

== Species ==
Species within the genus Triopha include:

- Triopha catalinae Cooper, 1863
- Triopha maculata MacFarland, 1905
- Triopha modesta Bergh, 1880
- Triopha occidentalis Fewkes, 1889

Synonyms

- Triopha aurantiaca Cockerell, 1908: synonym of Triopha maculata MacFarland, 1905
- Triopha elioti O'Donoghue, 1921: synonym of Triopha catalinae (J. G. Cooper, 1863) (unaccepted > junior subjective synonym)
- Triopha grandis MacFarland, 1905: synonym of Triopha occidentalis (Fewkes, 1889)
- Triopha scrippsiana Cockerell, 1915: synonym of Triopha catalinae (J. G. Cooper, 1863) (unaccepted > junior subjective synonym)
