= Plocamopherus maculatus =

Scientific classification
- Kingdom: Animalia
- Phylum: Mollusca
- Class: Gastropoda
- Order: Nudibranchia
- Family: Polyceridae
- Genus: Plocamopherus
- Species: P. maculatus

Binomial name
- Plocamopherus maculatus (Pease, 1860)

Species of gastropod

Plocamopherus maculatus is a species of sea slug, a nudibranch, a shell-less marine gastropod mollusk in the family Polyceridae.

== Distribution ==
This species was described from Hawaii where it is a moderately common nocturnal animal. It has also been reported from the Solomon Islands, the Marshall Islands and South Africa.
