= Joubiniopsis =

Scientific classification
- Kingdom: Animalia
- Phylum: Mollusca
- Class: Gastropoda
- Order: Nudibranchia
- Family: Polyceridae
- Subfamily: Triophinae
- Genus: Joubiniopsis; Risbec, 1928

Genus of gastropods

Joubiniopsis is a genus of sea slugs, specifically nudibranchs, shell-less marine gastropod molluscs in the family Polyceridae.

== Species ==
Species in the genus Joubiniopsis include:

- Joubiniopsis bouraili Risbec, 1928
