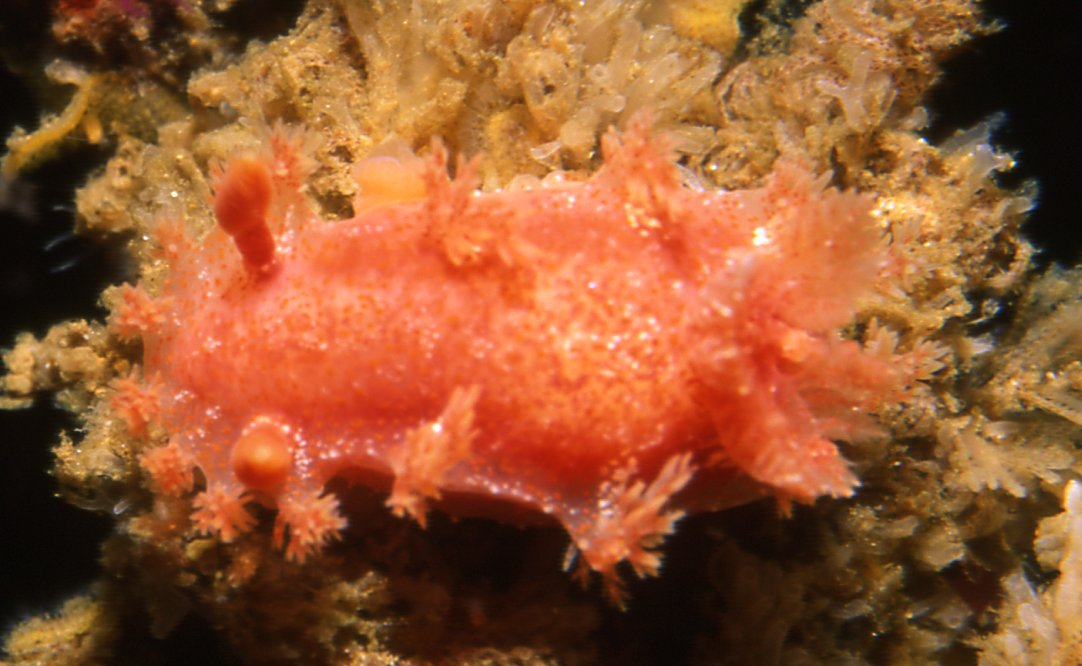
- tasselled nudibranch Kaloplocamus ramosus

Scientific classification
- Kingdom: Animalia
- Phylum: Mollusca
- Class: Gastropoda
- Order: Nudibranchia
- Family: Polyceridae
- Subfamily: Triophinae
- Genus: Kaloplocamus; Bergh, 1893

Synonyms
- Euplocamus Philippi, 1836 (Invalid: junior homonym of Euplocamus Latreille, 1809 [Lepidoptera]; Kaloplocamus is a replacement name); Heteroplocamus W. R. B. Oliver, 1915

= Kaloplocamus =

Genus of gastropods

Kaloplocamus is a genus of sea slugs, specifically nudibranchs, shell-less marine gastropod molluscs in the family Polyceridae.

It contains bioluminescent species.

== Species ==
Species in the genus Kaloplocamus include:

- Kaloplocamus acutus Baba, 1949
- Kaloplocamus albopunctatus J.C. Wei & L.F. Kong, 2023
- Kaloplocamus dokte Vallès & Gosliner, 2006
- Kaloplocamus gulo (Marcus, 1979)
- Kaloplocamus japonicus (Bergh, 1880)
- Kaloplocamus maculatus (Bergh, 1898)
- Kaloplocamus maru Vallès & Gosliner, 2006
- Kaloplocamus orientalis Thiele, 1925
- Kaloplocamus pacificus (Bergh, 1884)
- Kaloplocamus peludo Vallès & Gosliner, 2006
- Kaloplocamus ramosus (Cantraine, 1835)
- Kaloplocamus verrilli Martynov, 2002
- Kaloplocamus yatesi (Angas, 1864)

Species brought into synonymy

- Kaloplocamus atlanticus (Bergh, 1892): synonym of Kaloplocamus ramosus (Cantraine, 1835)
- Kaloplocamus aureus Odhner, 1932: synonym of Kaloplocamus ramosus (Cantraine, 1835)
- Kaloplocamus filosus Cattaneo-Vietti & Sordi, 1988: synonym of Kaloplocamus ramosus (Cantraine, 1835)
