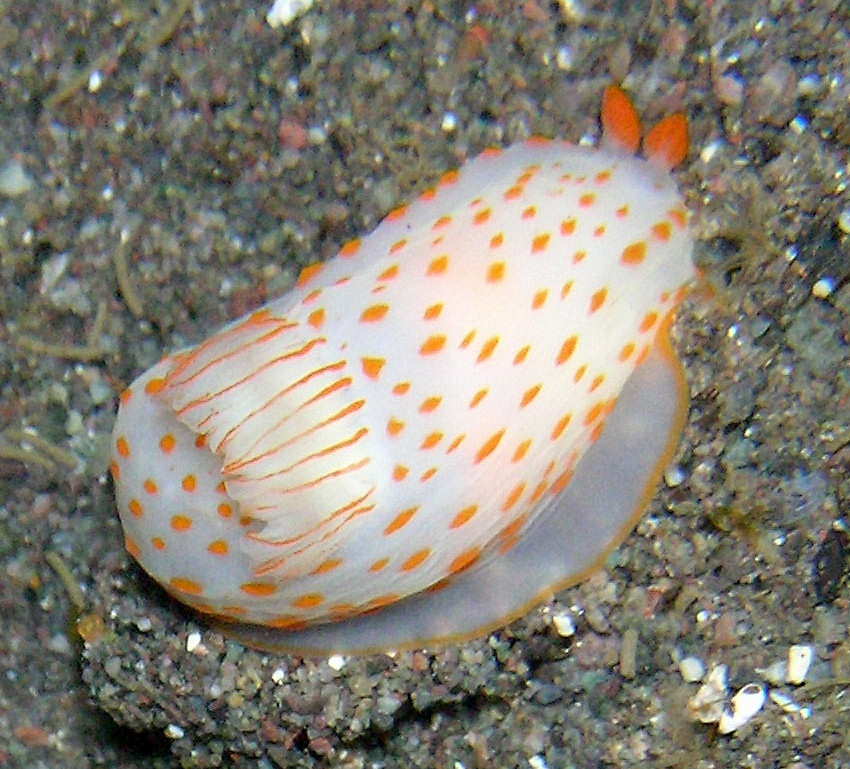
- Gymnodoris ceylonica

Scientific classification
- Kingdom: Animalia
- Phylum: Mollusca
- Class: Gastropoda
- Order: Nudibranchia
- Family: Polyceridae
- Subfamily: Polycerinae
- Genus: Gymnodoris; Stimpson, 1855

Synonyms
- Analogium Risbec, 1928; Trevelyana Kelaart, 1858

= Gymnodoris =

Genus of gastropods

Gymnodoris is a genus of sea slugs, dorid nudibranchs, shell-less marine gastropod molluscs in the family Polyceridae.

== Species ==
Species in the genus Gymnodoris include:

- Gymnodoris alba (Bergh, 1877)
- Gymnodoris amakusana (Baba, 1996)
- Gymnodoris arnoldi (Burn, 1957)
- Gymnodoris aurita (Gould, 1852)
- Gymnodoris ceylonica (Kelaart, 1858)
- Gymnodoris citrina (Bergh, 1875)
- Gymnodoris impudica (Rüppell & Leuckart, 1830)
- Gymnodoris inariensis Hamatani & Osumi, 2004
- Gymnodoris inornata Bergh, 1880
- Gymnodoris nigricolor Baba, 1960
- Gymnodoris okinawae Baba, 1936
- Gymnodoris pattani Swennen, 1996
- Gymnodoris striata (Eliot, 1908)
- Gymnodoris subflava Baba, 1949

Species brought into synonymy

- Gymnodoris impudica (Rüppell & Leuckart, 1828) synonym of Gymnodoris rubropapulosa
