= Lamellana =

Scientific classification
- Domain: Eukaryota
- Kingdom: Animalia
- Phylum: Mollusca
- Class: Gastropoda
- Order: Nudibranchia
- Superfamily: Polyceroidea
- Family: Polyceridae
- Subfamily: Polycerinae
- Genus: Lamellana; Lin, 1992

Genus of gastropods

Lamellana is a genus of sea slugs, dorid nudibranchs, shell-less marine gastropod molluscs in the family Polyceridae.

== Species ==
The only species in the genus Lamellana is:

- Lamellana gymnota Lin, 1992
