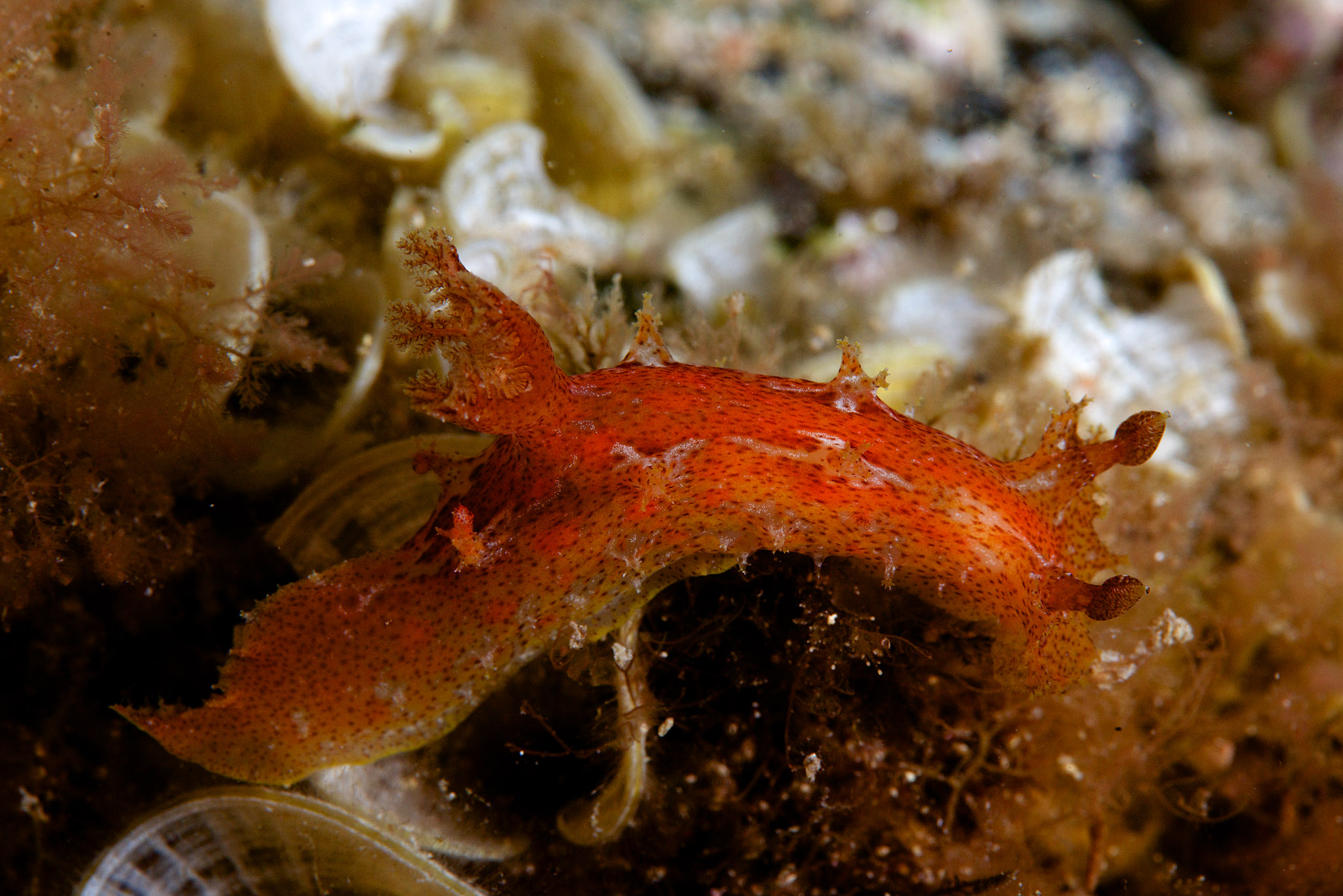
- Plocamopherus maderae

Scientific classification
- Domain: Eukaryota
- Kingdom: Animalia
- Phylum: Mollusca
- Class: Gastropoda
- Order: Nudibranchia
- Superfamily: Polyceroidea
- Family: Polyceridae
- Subfamily: Triophinae
- Genus: Plocamopherus (Rüppell & Leuckart, 1831)

= Plocamopherus =

Genus of gastropods

Plocamopherus is a genus of sea slugs, specifically nudibranchs, shell-less marine gastropod molluscs in the family Polyceridae, subfamily Triophinae. A unique character of Plocamopherus species is a globular bioluminescent organ at the tip of the pair of appendages which are placed just behind the gills. Many species are known to be nocturnal and several are from deep water. They feed on bryozoans.

It contains bioluminescent species.

== Species ==
Species in the genus Plocamopherus include:

- Plocamopherus amboinensis Bergh, 1890
- Plocamopherus apheles Barnard, 1927
- Plocamopherus ceylonicus (Kelaart, 1858)
- Plocamopherus fulgurans Risbec, 1928
- Plocamopherus imperialis Angas, 1864
- Plocamopherus indicus Bergh, 1890
- Plocamopherus lemur Vallès & Gosliner, 2006
- Plocamopherus lucayensis Hamann & Farmer, 1988
- Plocamopherus maculapodium Vallès & Gosliner, 2006
- Plocamopherus maculatus (Pease, 1860)
- Plocamopherus maderae (Lowe, 1842)
- Plocamopherus margaretae Vallès & Gosliner, 2006
- Plocamopherus ocellatus Rueppell & Leuckart, 1828
- Plocamopherus pecoso Vallès & Gosliner, 2006
- Plocamopherus pilatectus Hamann & Farmer, 1988
- Plocamopherus tilesii Bergh, 1877
