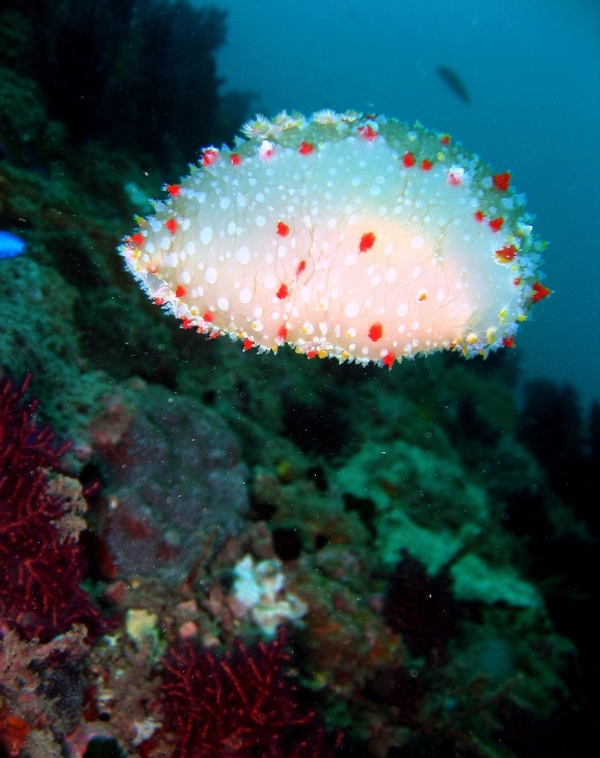

Scientific classification
- Kingdom: Animalia
- Phylum: Mollusca
- Class: Gastropoda
- Order: Nudibranchia
- Family: Polyceridae
- Genus: Kalinga
- Species: K. ornata

Binomial name
- Kalinga ornata Alder & Hancock

= Kalinga ornata =

Species of gastropod

Kalinga ornata is a species of large, colourful nudibranch in the family Polyceridae. It is the only species in the genus Kalinga, which is the type genus of the subfamily Kalinginae.

== Distribution ==
Kalinga ornata resides in the deep coastal waters of the Western Indo-Pacific (though it has also been reported from Hawaii). While it occasionally washes up in shallow regions, live individuals have been observed by divers at a depth of 6 m, they have been trawled from depths of 76 m, and observed by an ROV at a depth of 182 m.

== Description ==
Kalinga ornata is nocturnal, reaching sizes of at least 130 mm, and prefers sandy or silty substrate. It has been shown to feed on brittle stars, a completely unique diet for a nudibranch.

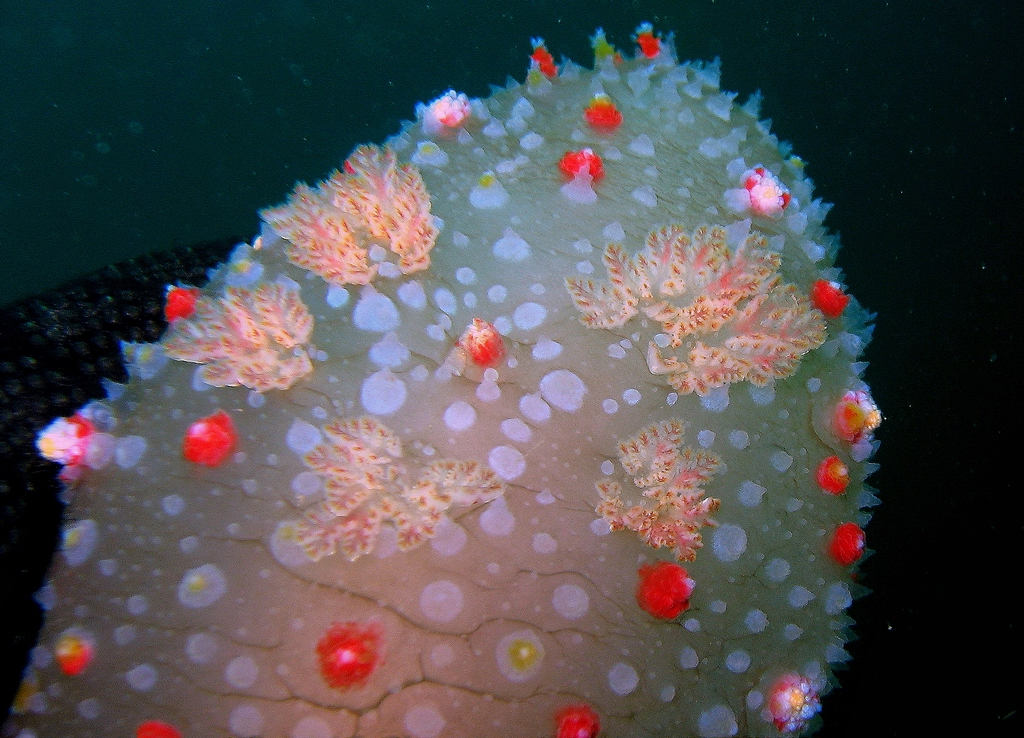
Closeup of K. ornata's naked gill: This photo was taken at a famous diving spot named '82.5K' along the northeast coast of Taiwan at 15 m depth.

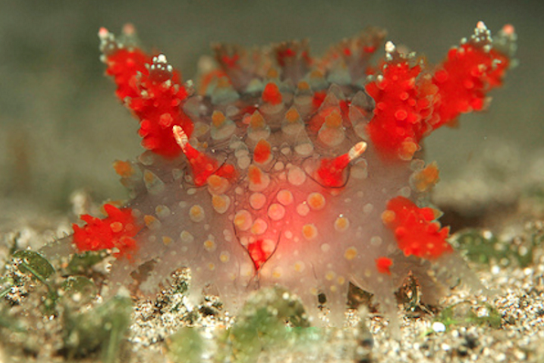
K. ornata
