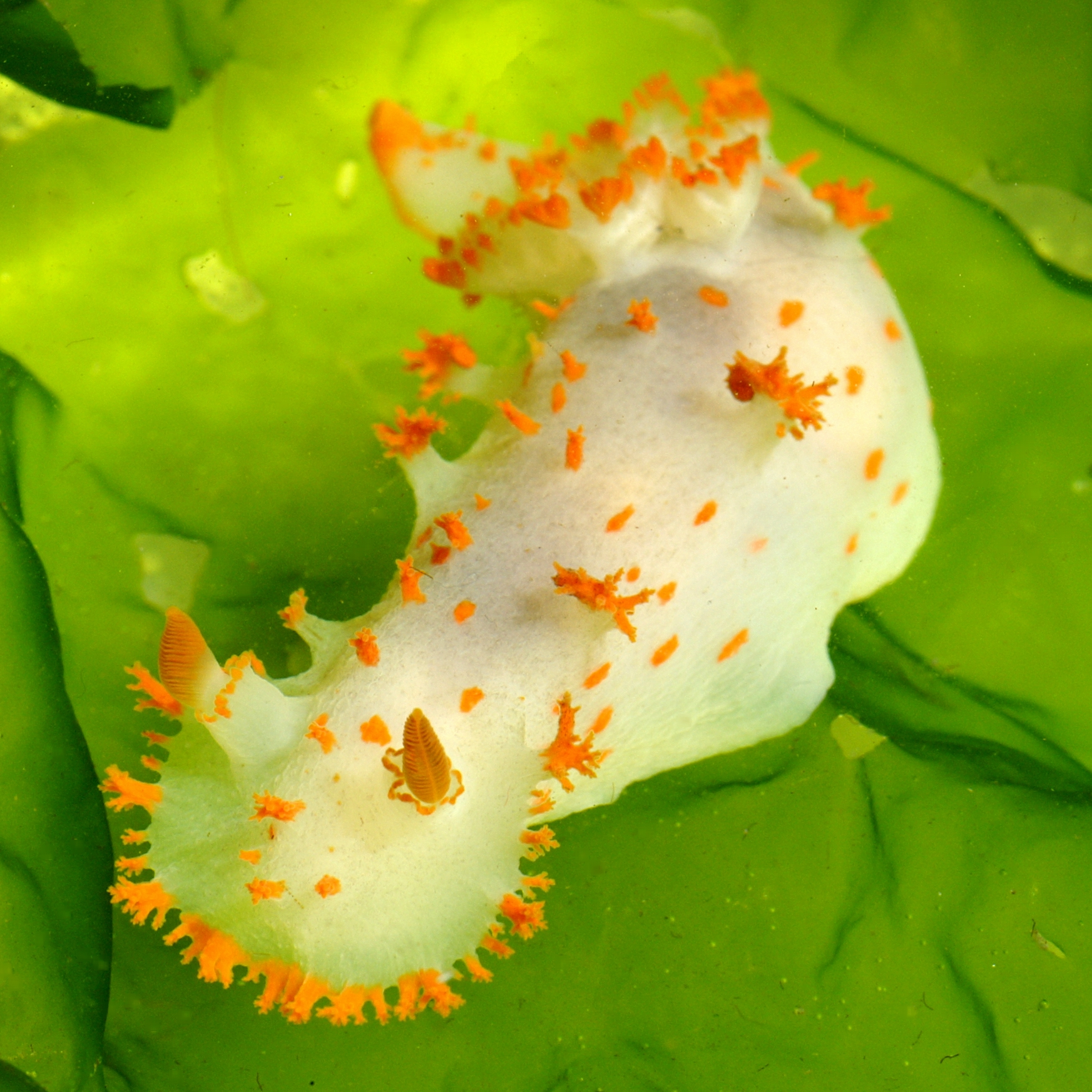
- Triopha modesta in situ, head at lower left

Scientific classification
- Kingdom: Animalia
- Phylum: Mollusca
- Class: Gastropoda
- Order: Nudibranchia
- Superfamily: Polyceroidea
- Family: Polyceridae; Alder & Hancock, 1845

Genera
- See text.

= Polyceridae =

Family of gastropods

The Polyceridae are a taxonomic family of sea slugs, dorid nudibranchs, marine gastropod mollusks within the superfamily Polyceroidea.

== Taxonomy ==
The family Polyceridae is classified within the clade Doridacea, itself belonging to the clade Euctenidiacea within the clade Nudipleura (according to the taxonomy of the Gastropoda by Bouchet & Rocroi, 2005).

The Polyceridae consists of these subfamilies:

- Kalinginae Pruvot-Fol, 1956
- Kankelibranchinae Ortea, Espinosa & Caballer, 2005
- Nembrothinae Burn, 1967
- Polycerinae Alder & Hancock, 1845 - synonyms: Triopinae Gray, 1847, Euphuridae Iredale & O'Donoghue, 1923, Gymnodorididae Odhner, 1941
- Triophinae Odhner, 1941
  - tribe Triophini Odhner, 1941 - synonym: Kaloplocaminae Pruvot-Fol, 1954
  - tribe Limaciini Winckworth, 1951 - synonym: Lailinae Burn, 1967

== Genera ==
Genera in the Polyceridae include:

- Subfamily Kalinginae Pruvot-Fol, 1956
  - Genus Kalinga Alder & Hancock, 1864 - type genus in the subfamily Kalinginae
- Subfamily Kankelibranchinae Ortea, Espinosa & Caballer, 2005
  - Genus Kankelibranchus Ortea, Espinosa & Caballer, 2005
- Subfamily Nembrothinae Burn, 1967
  - Genus Martadoris Willan & Chang, 2017
  - Genus Nembrotha Bergh, 1877 - type genus in the subfamily Nembrothinae
  - Genus Roboastra Bergh, 1877
  - Genus Tambja Burn, 1962
  - Genus Tyrannodoris Willan & Chang, 2017
- Subfamily Polycerinae Alder & Hancock, 1845
  - Genus Greilada Bergh, 1894
  - Genus Gymnodoris Stimpson, 1855
  - Genus Lamellana Lin, 1992
  - Genus Lecithophorus Macnae, 1958
  - Genus Palio Gray, 1857
  - Genus Paliolla Burn, 1958
  - Genus Polycera Cuvier, 1817 - type genus in the family Polyceridae
  - Genus Polycerella A. E. Verrill, 1881
  - Genus Thecacera Fleming, 1828
- Subfamily Triophinae Odhner, 1941
  - Genus Colga Bergh, 1880
  - Genus Crimora Alder and Hancock, 1855
  - Genus Heteroplocamus Oliver, 1915
  - Genus Holoplocamus Odhner, 1926
  - Genus Joubiniopsis Risbec, 1928
  - Genus Kaloplocamus Bergh, 1893
  - Genus Limacia O.F. Müller, 1781
  - Genus Plocamopherus (Rüppell & Leuckart, 1831)
  - Genus Triopha Bergh, 1880 - type genus in the subfamily Triophinae

Genera brought into synonymy

- Genus Cabrilla Fewkes, 1889: synonym of Triopha Bergh, 1880
- Genus Euplocamus Philippi, 1836: synonym of Kaloplocamus Bergh, 1892
- Genus Histiophorus Pease, 1860: synonym of Plocamopherus Rüppell in Rüppell & Leuckart, 1828
- Genus Issa Bergh, 1881: synonym of Colga Bergh, 1880
- Genus Issena Iredale & O'Donoghue, 1923: synonym of Colga Bergh, 1880:
- Genus Laila MacFarland 1905: synonym of Limacia Muller, 1781
- Genus Peplidia Lowe, 1842: synonym of Plocamopherus Rüppell in Rüppell & Leuckart, 1828
