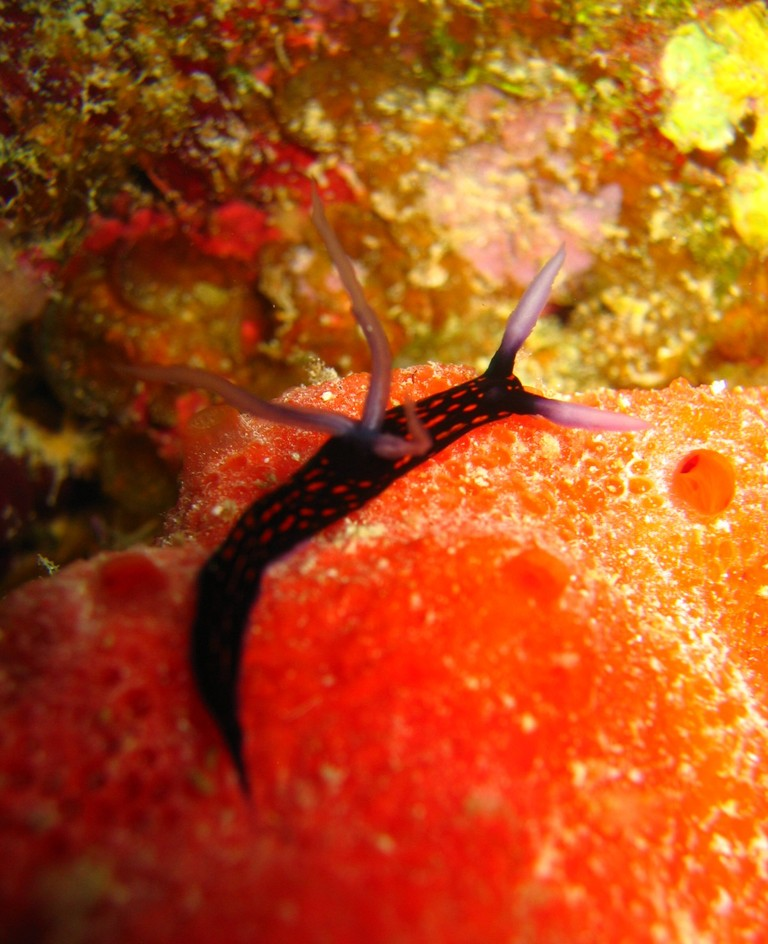
- Roboastra_gracilis

Scientific classification
- Kingdom: Animalia
- Phylum: Mollusca
- Class: Gastropoda
- Order: Nudibranchia
- Family: Polyceridae
- Subfamily: Nembrothinae
- Genus: Roboastra; Bergh, 1877

Species
- See text

= Roboastra =

Genus of gastropods

Roboastra is a genus of sea slugs, polycerid nudibranchs, marine gastropod molluscs in the family Polyceridae. They are carnivorous, feeding on other species of nudibranch.

== Species ==
Species in the genus Roboastra include:

- Roboastra arika Burn, 1967
- Roboastra gracilis (Bergh, 1877)
- Roboastra rubropapulosa (Bergh, 1905)
- Roboastra tentaculata (Pola, Cervera & Gosliner, 2005)

Species transferred to other genera:

- Roboastra caboverdensis Pola, Cervera & Gosliner, 2003 synonym of Tyrannodoris caboverdensis (Pola, Cervera & Gosliner, 2003)
- Roboastra ernsti Pola, Padula, Gosliner & Cervera, 2014 synonym of Tyrannodoris ernsti (Pola, Padula, Gosliner & Cervera, 2014)
- Roboastra europaea García-Gómez, 1985 synonym of Tyrannodoris europaea (García-Gómez, 1985)
- Roboastra gratiosa (Bergh, 1890) synonym of Tambja gratiosa
- Roboastra leonis Pola, Cervera & Gosliner, 2005 synonym of Tyrannodoris leonis (Pola, Cervera & Gosliner, 2005)
- Roboastra luteolineata (Baba, 1936) synonym of Tyrannodoris luteolineata (Baba, 1936)
- Roboastra nikolasi Pola, Padula, Gosliner & Cervera, 2014 synonym of Tyrannodoris nikolasi (Pola, Padula, Gosliner & Cervera, 2014)
- Roboastra ricei Pola, Cervera & Gosliner, 2008 synonym of Tyrannodoris ricei (Pola, Cervera & Gosliner, 2008)
- Roboastra tigris Farmer, 1978 synonym of Tyrannodoris tigris (Farmer, 1978)
