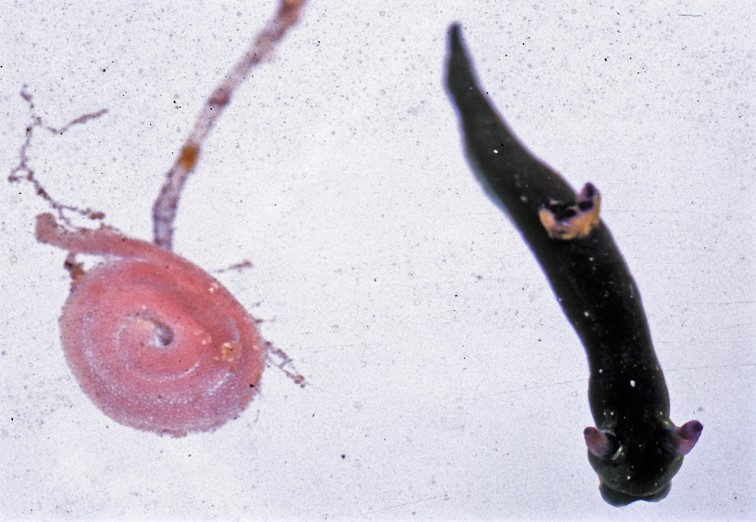
- Martadoris amakusana, with egg mass on left, Maldives

Scientific classification
- Kingdom: Animalia
- Phylum: Mollusca
- Class: Gastropoda
- Order: Nudibranchia
- Family: Polyceridae
- Genus: Martadoris
- Species: M. amakusana

Binomial name
- Martadoris amakusana (Baba, 1987)

Synonyms
- Tambja amakusana Baba, 1987

= Martadoris amakusana =

Species of gastropod

Martadoris amakusana is a species of colourful sea slug, a dorid nudibranch, a marine gastropod mollusk in the family Polyceridae. It was originally placed in Tambja before being re-assigned to the new genus Martadoris in 2017.

== External Morphology ==
Martadoris amakusana is described from both the original 1987 description by Kikutaro Baba and the 2006 redescription by Marta Pola et al.

The body is elongate and smooth, with a long pointed foot. While Pola et al. described the mantle as reduced, both Baba and Pola et al. describe a "mantle edge" where there may or may not be a few indistinct tubercules. The tail has no crest. The oral tentacles are thin flat lobes, with a ventral longitudinal slit typical of the genus. There are 3-5 short tripinnate nonretractile gill branches forming a semicircle around a non-elevated anal papilla. Rhinophores are short and nonretractile with 15-20 lamellae. The rhinophoral sheaths are elevated, an unusual feature for the genus.

Its ground colour is yellowish-green, and may or may not have small whitish spots across the body. The tip of the tail, the tips of the rhinophores, and the tips of the gill plumes are all a purple. The rhinophores, rhinophoral sheaths, and oral tentacles are yellowish-green. The outer and inner gills are also described as "yellowish-green" in both texts, though the photo accompanying the 2006 paper contradicted this by depicting starkly white gills. There are some individuals that appear to be very dark green as opposed to the typical yellow-green.

It can resemble Tambja kava extremely closely, and the most reliable means of differentiation is by dissection, as their internal anatomies differ greatly. Externally, T. kava has purple colouration on the oral tentacles and the bases of the rhinophores, while M. amakusana does not. T. kava also has pre-rhinophoral sensory organs between the rhinophores and oral tentacles. However, they are not as pronounced as they are in other Tambja species, and the "wrinkled" look of some small green Nembrothinids may make the presence of such organs difficult to ascertain.

There are a great many small green Nembrothinids with only minute differences that have not yet been described as unique species or confirmed as known species, so caution with identification is recommended until further study.

== Distribution ==
This species was described from Tomioka, Amakusa, Japan. It has been reported from The Great Barrier Reef and across the Indo-Pacific, as far west as the Maldives.

There have been reports from Mozambique and Kenya, but the examined specimens underwent neither dissection nor DNA analysis, so it is unclear if these are considered confirmed.

== Known Misidentifications ==
Due to the existence of several other extremely similar small green Nembrothinids, including those that have yet to be described by science, confirming identifications can be tricky, and misidentifications are common even in academic text. Additionally the very similar, far more recently-described Tambja kava has led to many outdated identifications.

In Gosliner et al. (2008), the photos detailed as Tambja amakusana were in fact later found to be Tambja kava, detailed in the Marta Pola et al. (2014) paper establishing the new species.

In an inventory of sea slugs in New South Wales in 2016, what is labeled as "Tambja tenuilineata" is in fact M. amakusana. Both authors have since rescinded that initial ID.

In an inventory of Thai waters in 2021, what is labeled as "Tambja amakusana" (=Martadoris amakusana) is in fact an undescribed Roboastra species often confused for Roboastra tentaculata.
