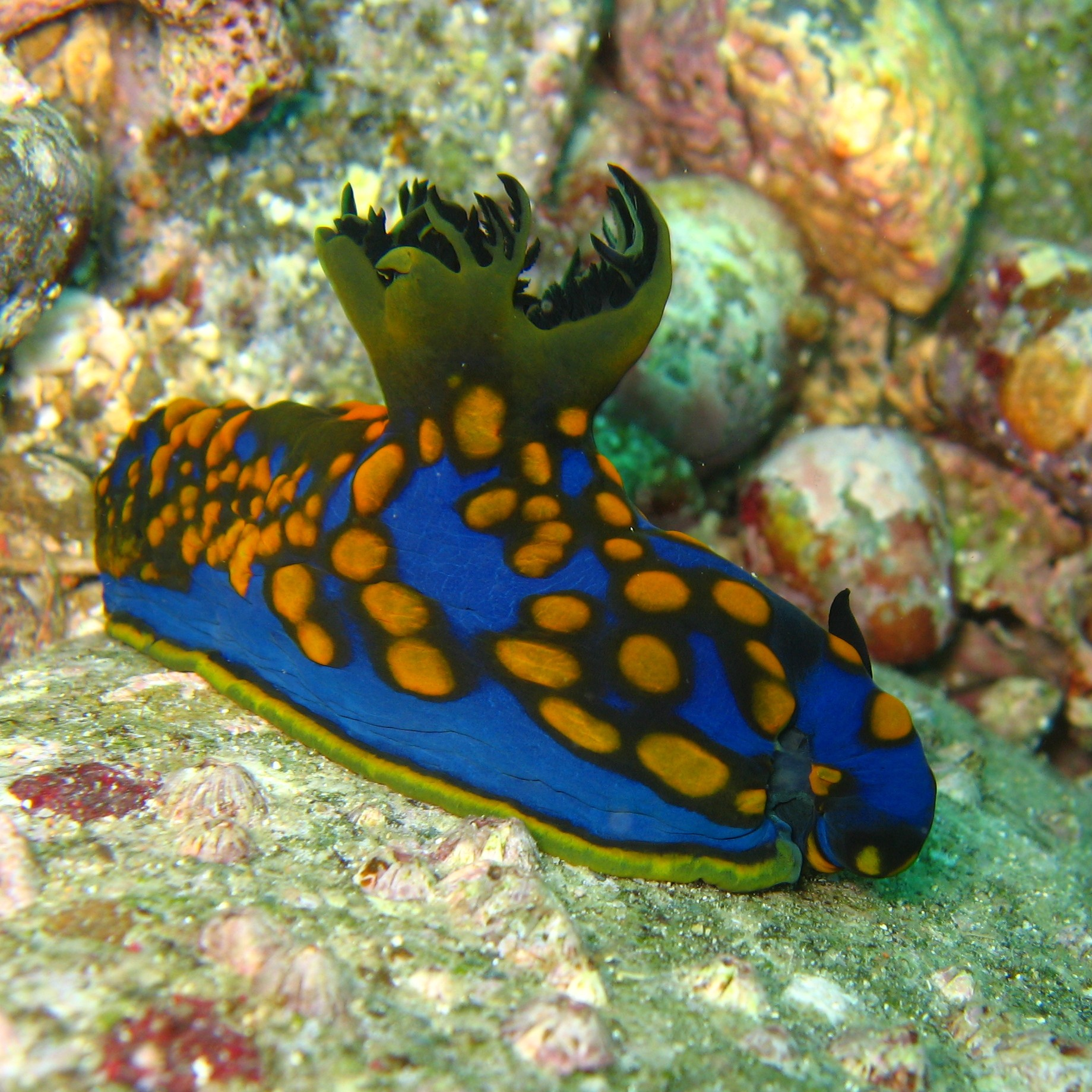
- Tambja sagamiana in Sukumo Bay, Kōchi Prefecture, Japan, head end towards the right

Scientific classification
- Kingdom: Animalia
- Phylum: Mollusca
- Class: Gastropoda
- Order: Nudibranchia
- Family: Polyceridae
- Subfamily: Nembrothinae
- Genus: Tambja; Burn, 1962

= Tambja =

Genus of gastropods

Tambja is a genus of colorful sea slugs, dorid nudibranchs, shell-less marine gastropod mollusks in the family Polyceridae.

== Biology ==
These nudibranchs feed on bryozoans. They have a radula which bears a rachidian tooth whose upper margin is either smooth or notched; the lateral tooth has two crowns, and the other teeth are so flat as to resemble plates.

== Pre-rhinophoral Sensory Organs ==
The most significant external feature of the genus Tambja is the ovular structure of "lateral slots" located between the rhinophores and the oral tentacles. In many species, they look a bit like the "cheekbones" of the animal, and many are coloured as if they have applied blush. In species like Tambja morosa and Tambja verconis they are very pronounced. Yet in other species, like Tambja dracomus and Tambja kava, they are far smaller and more subtle, or can even be obscured by the brim of the anterior mantle margin.

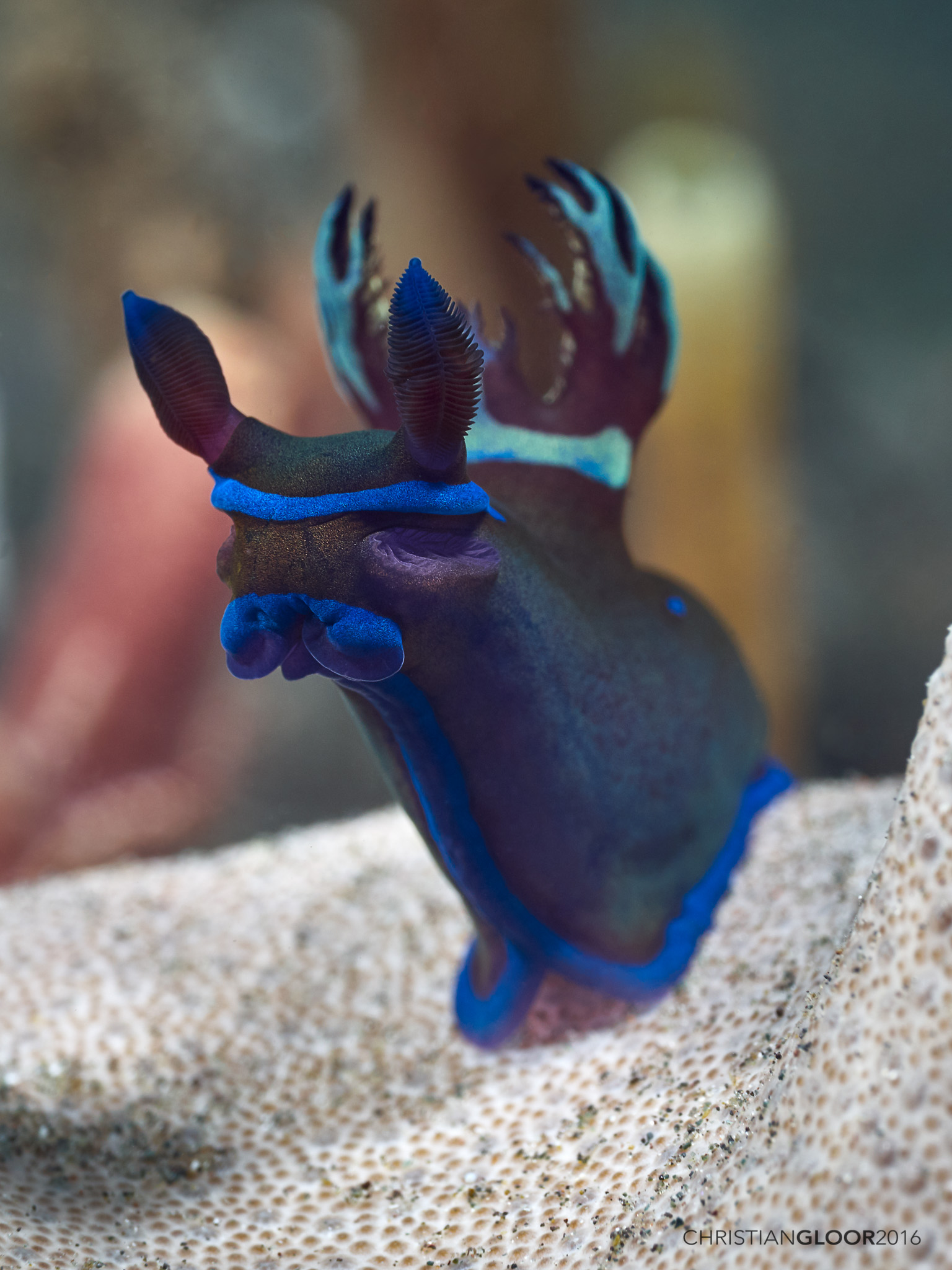
The pre-rhinophoral sensory organs in this Tambja morosa are even tinged slightly pink, evoking the image of blush upon cheekbones.

These ovular structures are lamellate upon close inspection, and sit over a horizontal slit in the slug's body that can dilate at will. Dissection led to the discovery that it is connected to the rhinophores internally, confirming that the purpose of these structures are sensory in nature.

All species of Tambja are considered to have these pre-rhinophoral sensory organs. The only species who are unconfirmed to possess them are species that are only known from a single observation or single preserved specimen. This makes pre-rhinophoral sensory organs the most defining external diagnostic feature of Tambja sea slugs, as neither Nembrotha, Martadoris, nor Tyrannodoris possess these lateral slots. The type species of Roboastra, Roboastra gracilis also does not possess them.

The pre-rhinophoral sensory organ of this Tambja dracomus is barely visible, glimpsed as a small bump between the mantle brim and the silhouette of its oral tentacles.

The only exceptions are Roboastra tentaculata and the several related, unnamed Roboastra species do. These animals however can be easily separated from Tambja sea slugs, as they possess the dorso-laterally grooved oral tentacles distinct to Roboastra. The presence of the lateral slots in addition to other very Tambja-like internal anatomy have led some to insist they should be removed from genus Roboastra, yet they continue to remain therein on basis of former a sister-clade with R. gracilis.

== Species ==
Species in the genus Tambja include:

- Tambja abdere Farmer, 1978
- Tambja affinis (Eliot, 1904)
- Tambja amitina (Bergh, 1905) - nomen dubium
- Tambja anayana Ortea, 1989
- Tambja blacki Pola, Cervera & Gosliner, 2006
- Tambja brasiliensis Pola, Padula, Gosliner & Cervera, 2014
- Tambja caeruleocirrus Willan & Chang, 2017
- Tambja capensis (Bergh, 1907)
- Tambja ceutae Garcia-Gomez & Ortea, 1988
- Tambja crioula Pola, Padula, Gosliner & Cervera, 2014
- Tambja dracomus Willan & Chang, 2017
- Tambja diaphana (Bergh, 1877) - nomen dubium
- Tambja eliora (Er. Marcus & Ev. Marcus, 1967)
- Tambja fantasmalis Ortea & García-Gómez, 1986
- Tambja gabrielae Pola, Cervera, & Gosliner, 2005
- Tambja gratiosa (Bergh, 1890)
- Tambja haidari Pola, Cervera, & Gosliner, 2006
- Tambja kava Pola, Padula, Gosliner & Cervera, 2014
- Tambja marbellensis Schick & Cervera, 1998
- Tambja morosa (Bergh, 1877)
- Tambja mullineri Farmer, 1978
- Tambja olivaria Yonow, 1994
- Tambja pulcherrima Willan & Chang, 2017
- Tambja sagamiana (Baba, 1955)
- Tambja simplex Ortea & Moro, 1999
- Tambja stegosauriformis Pola, Cervera, & Gosliner, 2005
- Tambja tenuilineata Miller & Haagh, 2005
- Tambja verconis (Basedow & Hedley, 1905) - type species
- Tambja victoriae Pola, Cervera, & Gosliner, 2005
- Tambja zulu Pola, Cervera, & Gosliner, 2005

Species brought into synonymy:

- Tambja amakusana Baba,1987: Martadoris amakusana (Baba,1987)
- Tambja divae (Er. Marcus, 1958): synonym of Martadoris divae (Er. Marcus, 1958)
- Tambja fusca Farmer,1978: synonym of Tambja abdere Farmer, 1978
- Tambja kushimotoensis Baba, 1987: synonym of Tambja morosa (Bergh, 1877)
- Tambja limaciformis (Eliot, 1908): synonym of Martadoris limaciformis (Eliot, 1908)
- Tambja mediterranea M. Domínguez, Pola & Ramón, 2015: synonym of Martadoris mediterranea (M. Domínguez, Pola & Ramón, 2015)
- Tambja oliva K. B. Meyer, 1977: synonym of Martadoris oliva (K. B. Meyer, 1977)
- Tambja tentaculata Pola, Cervera & Gosliner, 2005: synonym of Roboastra tentaculata (Pola, Cervera & Gosliner, 2005)
