= Roboastra tentaculata =

Scientific classification
- Kingdom: Animalia
- Phylum: Mollusca
- Class: Gastropoda
- Order: Nudibranchia
- Family: Polyceridae
- Subfamily: Nembrothinae
- Genus: Roboastra
- Species: R. tentaculata

Binomial name
- Roboastra tentaculata (Pola, Cervera & Gosliner, 2005)

Synonyms
- Tambja tentaculata Pola, Cervera & Gosliner, 2005

Species of gastropod

Roboastra tentaculata is a species of sea slug, a polycerid nudibranch, a marine gastropod mollusc in the subfamily Nembrothinae in the family Polyceridae.

== Etymology ==
"Tentaculata" is used to describe Roboastra tentaculata due to the presence of "enlarged" oral tentacles. It was known that these elongate outward-turned oral tentacles with dorso-lateral grooves are a trademark of the genus Roboastra. However, as the species was initially placed in Tambja where no other species had such oral tentacles, the characteristic was deemed very significant.

== Taxonomic History ==
At its establishment in 2005, R. tentaculata was placed in genus Tambja. Even at its naming the authors acknowledged that the well-developed, dorso-laterally grooved oral tentacles far more resembled Roboastra than any known Tambja, but in dissection its internal morphology was deemed too dissimilar from species placed in Roboastra at that time.

After more phylogenetic analysis of Nembrothinae as a whole, it was found that the then-named Tambja tentaculata formed a sister-clade with Roboastra gracilis. The following year, the authors took their own suggestion and officially reassigned the species as Roboastra tentaculata in order to maintain the monophyly of Roboastra.

Interestingly, the Roboastra species that R. tentaculata was deemed too dissimilar from at its establishment were removed from Roboastra years later in 2017 and placed within their own genus, Tyrannodoris.

In the same study, the diagnositics for Roboastra referred to Roboastra gracilis exclusively, and in the acknowledgements section emphasizes "...resurrected the overlooked genus Roboastra in 1967 with only a single included species (Burn, 1967) [still only this one species]". Yet Roboastra tentaculata was not included within the systematics for any genus, in fact mentioned only once in passing. Despite the study's insistence that the presence of pre-rhinophoral sensory organs, a trait that R. tentaculata possesses, do not occur outside of the genus Tambja, R. tentaculata was not among the Tambja list of species. Even then, the redescribed diagnositics for Tambja would anyways exclude R. tentaculata, again on account of its well-developed dorso-laterally grooved oral tentacles. So, it seems the species as a whole was not within the realm of the 2017 study.

== External Morphology ==
Roboastra tentaculata, 20mm when living, is a slender Nembrothinid with a long pointed end of foot. The body is smooth, without pits. The genital pore is located on the right side halfway between the gills and rhinophores. The margin of the head is brim-like, and dips in the center, like if the letter "V" or "U" shrugged. There exist pre-rhinophoral sensory organs between the rhinophores and oral tentacles. Their oral tentacles are very well developed, grooved dorsolaterally along the outward face; a requisite characteristic of the genus Roboastra. The rhinophoral sheaths are well developed, and contained fully retractile rhinophores are perfoliate with roughly 20 lamellae. The 5 bipinnate gills are nonretractile, and form a semicircle around the anal papilla.

The ground colour is green, with yellow bands running the length of the body. However, looking upon it, one might think it is yellow with green bands; it will be described herein as such for clarity of description. The genital pore, rhinophores and rhinophoral sheaths, gills, are green. The oral tentacles are green, with yellow pigment at the base. The foot margin and full notal margin are green, the notal margin joining behind the gills and continuing in a green ridge to the tail tip. A central green stripe starts between the rhinophores and continues to the base of the gills. A green stripe begins at the base of each rhinophore or at the sub-dermal eyes, and continue down the body to meet behind the gills, parallel to the notal margin. There is generally a green stripe on each lateral side of the slug, running from pre-rhinophoral slots to tail tip. The remainder of the animal is yellow.

== Distribution ==
This species was described from Guam. The existence of some very similar possibly undescribed yellow-and-blue species of Roboastra makes distribution difficult to verify, but there is another confirmed record of R. tentaculata occurring in the Philippines.

== Diet ==
As of the 2017 study, there have been no observations of Roboastra tentaculata nor its sister-species Roboastra gracilis feeding. All predaceous sea slugs previously classified in Roboastra have been moved to Tyrannodoris, so there is currently no precedent of diet within the genus. There were previously considered many "sightings" of R. gracilis preying upon other sea slugs, but upon further examination all instances were in fact young Tyrannodoris luteolineata, whose juvenile form can resemble R. gracilis to the extreme.

It is speculated that Roboastra feed on bryozoans, much like Tambja does, as photographs of both members of the genus depict with high frequency individuals crawling upon bryozoans. However, R. tentaculata and R. gracilis have very different radular structures, with the former most closely resembling bryozoan-feeding Tambjids and the latter resembling most closely predaceous Tyrannodorids.

== Misidentification ==
Roboastra tentaculata has had a history of being misattributed to a currently unnamed species of Tambja. This has occurred frequently in both guidebooks and academic texts, even in the texts of the authors who established the species.

The Sea Slug Forum's pages for Tambja tentaculata (=Roboastra Tentaculata) contain a mix of correctly identified R. tentaculata, and also a great deal of the unnamed Tambja species.

In Pola et al. (2014), in Figure 9H, the individual depicted feeding on bryozoans is not Roboastra tentaculata, but in fact the unnamed Tambja species.

Correctly labelled Tambja tentaculata (=Roboastra tentaculata) can be found in Pola et al. (2005) Figure 1A, and Pola et al. (2006) Figure 19D.

There are continued observations of a great deal many other Roboastra animals, and, especially in regards to a similar blue-and-yellow animal, there is generally disagreement on which are unique unnamed species and which are R. tentaculata. The addition of juvenile Roboastra muddy the waters further, as juvenile Nembrothinids are often less pigmented and have fainter markings, and some mistake less distinct blue-and-yellow animals as simply juvenile R. tentaculata. Overall, Roboastra with pre-rhinophoral lateral slots is a diverse area that requires further study for confident differentiation.

The Sea Slug forum page entitled "Tambja sp. 6" has unintentionally compiled a good record of the variety of Roboastra that are often confused for R. tentaculata.
