= Tambja kava =

Scientific classification
- Kingdom: Animalia
- Phylum: Mollusca
- Class: Gastropoda
- Order: Nudibranchia
- Family: Polyceridae
- Subfamily: Nembrothinae
- Genus: Tambja
- Species: T. kava

Binomial name
- Tambja kava Pola, Padula, Gosliner & Cervera, 2014

Species of gastropod

Tambja kava is a species of colourful dorid nudibranch, sea slug, in the family Polyceridae and subfamily Nembrothinae.

== Etymology ==
Tambja kava was first described in 2014 from specimens collected in Vanuatu. It was named for Kava, the most popular drink in both Vanuatu and all across West Pacific Island cultures.

== Description ==
Tambja kava is a small and elongate, with a long pointed tail. It has a mantle edge that joins behind the gills. The oral tentacles are thin, flat lobes. The gill circle consists of five short tripinnate gill branches arranged in a semicircle around the anal papilla. The retractile perfoliate rhinophores have about 16 lamellae, rhinophoral sheaths are visible. There are pre-rhinophoral sensory organs on either side of the body between the rhinophores and oral tentacles in the form of small lateral slots.

The original text states that the ground colour of the body is greenish, though this can vary to yellowish-green or even a vibrant yellow-orange (both images, while labeled otherwise, were referenced in Pola et al. (2014) as very likely being T. kava). The rhinophore sheaths are the same colour as the body. Reddish stripes run longitudinally across the body, "that gtive the body a corrugated appearance". There may or may not be whitish markings on the body, usually arranged along the mantle edge. The rhinophore tips, rhinophore bases, and upper lamellae are purple. The remaining lower lamellae are reddish. The upper half of the gills are purple, and the lower portions are white on both inner and outer faces. There is purple colouration also on the tip of the tail, and the oral tentacles.

T. kava shares considerable overlap with Martadoris amakusana, and the two often cannot be differentiated with certainty without dissection, as their internal anatomies are quite distinct from each other. Additionally, there are a great many other small green Nembrothinids, either undescribed by science or unconfirmed as established species, that share enormous similarities with both slugs. It will take further study and analysis to better define the lines between taxa.

T. kava does have purple colouration on its oral tentacles and rhinophoral bases, whereas the oral tentacles and rhinophoral bases of M. amakusana are the same yellowish-green of its body. However, due to undescribed diversity still persistent in M. amakusana and Martadoris as a whole, purple rhinophoral bases and reddish lamellae alone are not enough to definitively identify an animal as T. kava.

T. kava's most unique feature external feature is its pre-rhinophoral organs, a feature that occurs in all Tambja species yet Martadorids lack completely. However, they are not as distinct as they are in others of the genus, making species-level differentiation difficult, especially amongst individuals that are particularly "wrinkled".

== Distribution ==
T. kava is confirmed to live within the Vanuatu Archipelago, Japan, and across the Indo-Pacific, possibly living as far West as the Southern African coasts.
