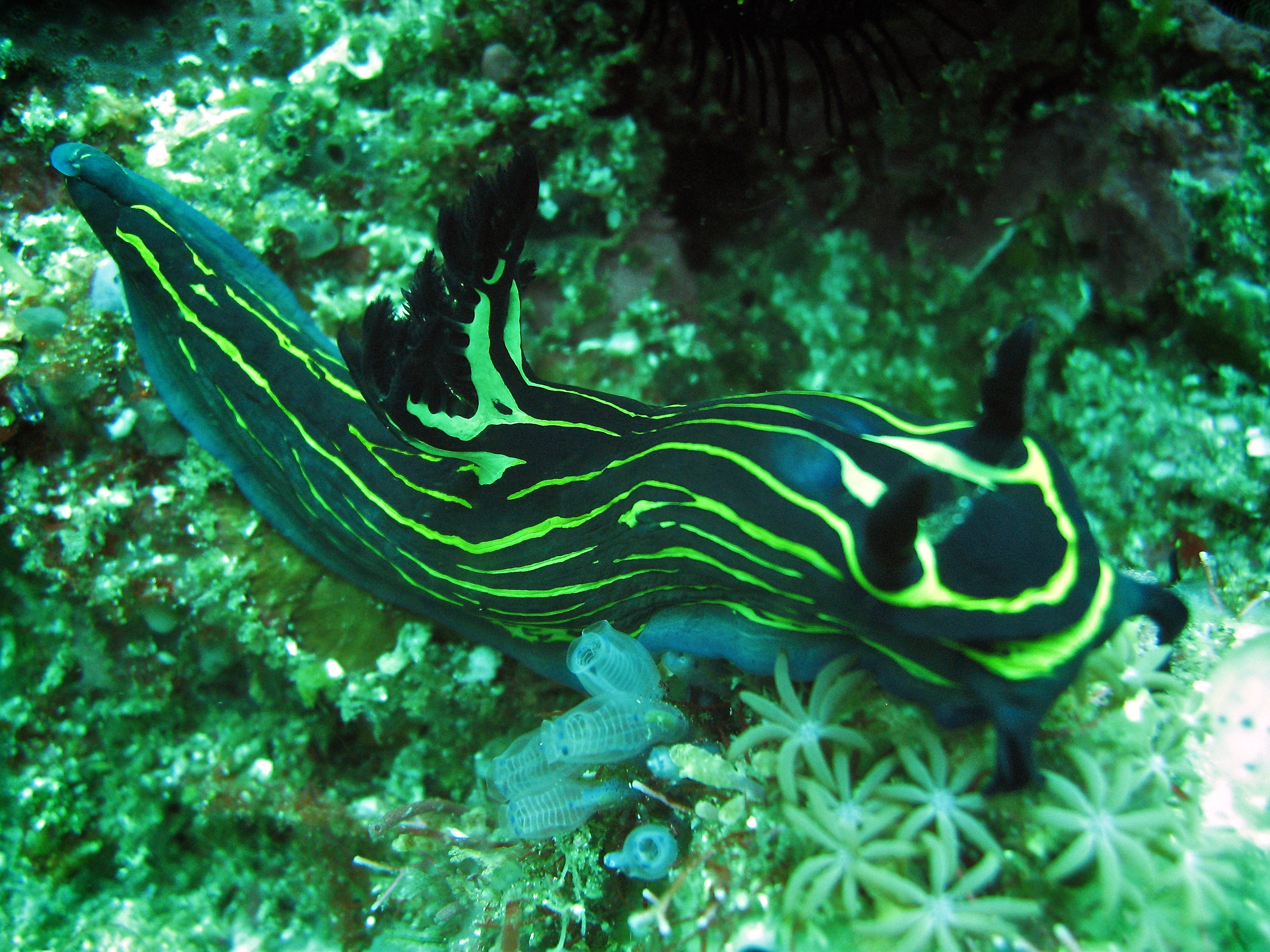
- Tyrannodoris luteolineata in Komodo, Indonesia.

Scientific classification
- Kingdom: Animalia
- Phylum: Mollusca
- Class: Gastropoda
- Order: Nudibranchia
- Family: Polyceridae
- Genus: Tyrannodoris
- Species: T. luteolineata

Binomial name
- Tyrannodoris luteolineata Baba, 1936

Synonyms
- Nembrotha luteolineata Baba, 1936; Roboastra luteolineata (Baba, 1936)

= Tyrannodoris luteolineata =

Species of gastropod

Tyrannodoris luteolineata is a species of sea slug, a polycerid nudibranch, a marine gastropod mollusc in the family Polyceridae.

== Distribution ==
This species was described from the Ryukyu Islands, Japan. It has been reported widely in the tropical Indo-Pacific Ocean. It has been observed as far south as the Poor Knights Islands in New Zealand in the Southern Hemisphere. This species is sometimes confused with the nudibranch Tambja affinis due to its outwardly similar appearance.

== Description ==
Tyrannodoris luteolineata is quite large in comparison to most other sea-slugs. It is black, with yellow lines running lengthwise down the body. It can be distinguished from other similar-looking nudibranchs by the light green patches on the top of the head between its rhinophores. It is a fast-moving species.

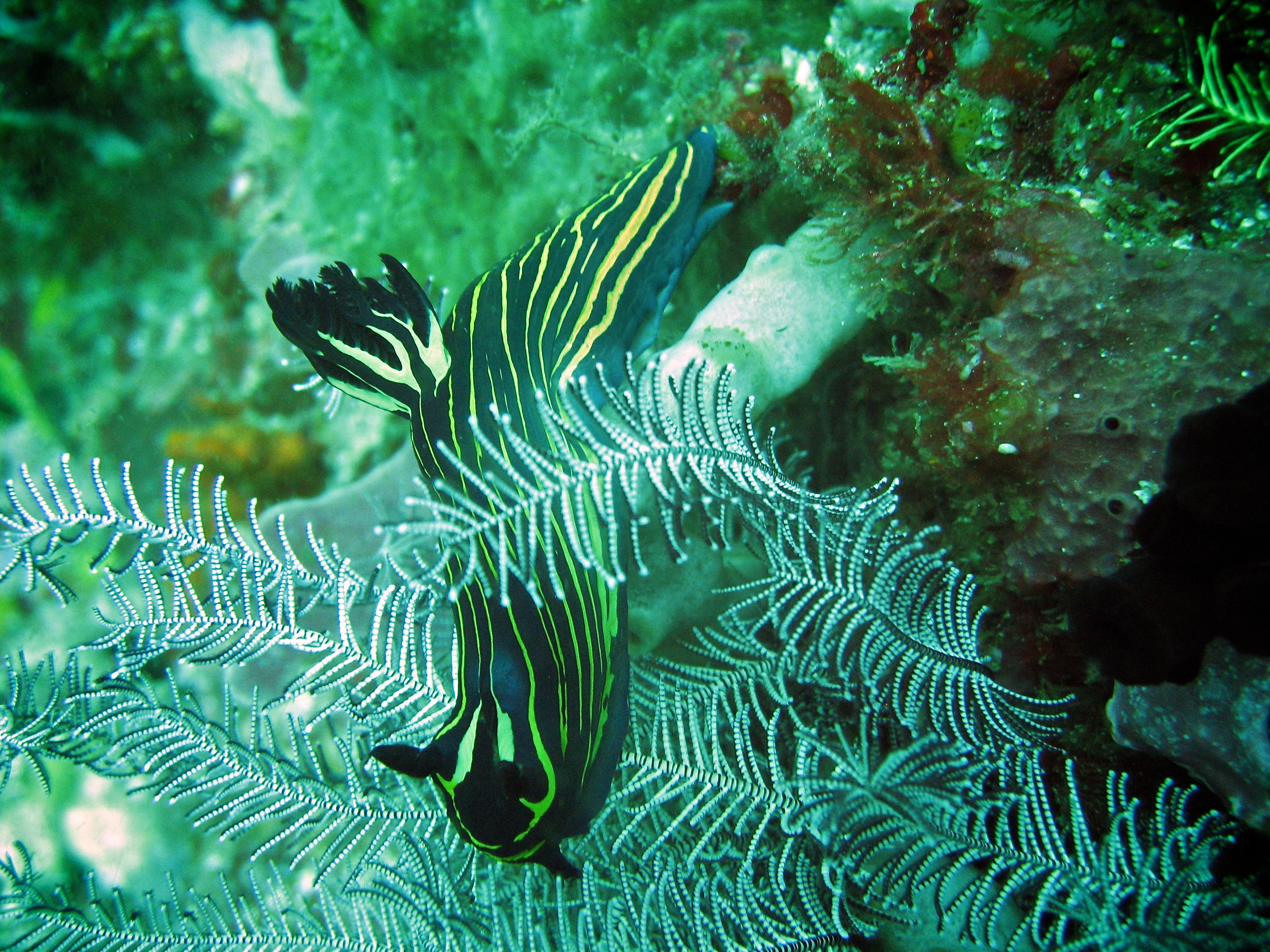
Tyrannodoris luteolineata in Komodo, Indonesia.

== Ecology ==
Tyrannodoris luteolineata, like other species in the genus Tyrannodoris, feeds on other nudibranchs, actively hunting them out. The species seems to generally feed only on nudibranchs from the family Polyceridae and has been observed eating Tambja morosa, Tambja verconis and Nembrotha kubaryana. It is also cannibalistic and will eat smaller individuals of its own species.
