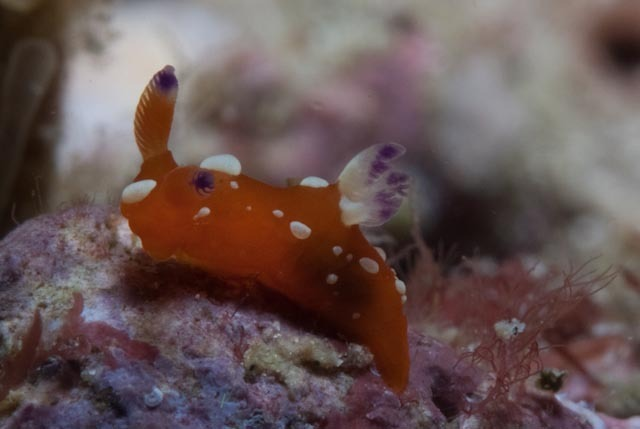
- Martadoris cf. limaciformis

Scientific classification
- Kingdom: Animalia
- Phylum: Mollusca
- Class: Gastropoda
- Order: Nudibranchia
- Family: Polyceridae
- Subfamily: Nembrothinae
- Genus: Martadoris; Willan & Chang, 2017

Type species
- Martadoris amakusana (Baba, 1987)

= Martadoris =

Genus of gastropods

Martadoris is a genus of colorful sea slugs, dorid nudibranchs, shell-less marine gastropod mollusks in the family Polyceridae.

== Etymology ==
The genus was established in 2017 and named for Marta Pola, considered the world expert on Polycerid sea slugs, for her efforts in pioneering an enormous amount of research in this area.

== Description ==
Members of Martadoris are very small Nembrothinids, less than 30mm at full estended length. The rhinophoral sheaths are greatly reduced, and they fully lack the pre-rhinophoral sensory organs that are present in Tambja species. Their oral tentacles have a "ventral longitudinal slit", and are not enlarged like the oral tentacles of Tyrannodoris and Roboastra species.

Martadorids eat arborescent bryozoans.

== Species ==
Species in the genus Martadoris include:

- Martadoris amakusana (Baba, 1987)
- Martadoris divae (Er. Marcus, 1958)
- Martadoris limaciformis (Eliot, 1908)
- Martadoris mediterranea (Domínguez, Pola & Ramón, 2015)
- Martadoris oliva (K. B. Meyer, 1977)
