= Tambja amitina =

Scientific classification
- Kingdom: Animalia
- Phylum: Mollusca
- Class: Gastropoda
- Order: Nudibranchia
- Family: Polyceridae
- Genus: Tambja
- Species: T. amitina

Binomial name
- Tambja amitina amitina (Bergh, 1905)

Synonyms
- Nembrotha amitina Bergh, 1905

Species of gastropod

Tambja amitina is a species of sea slug, a dorid nudibranch, a marine gastropod mollusk in the family Polyceridae. It is currently considered to be a nomen dubium.

== Distribution ==
This species was originally described from Indonesia.
