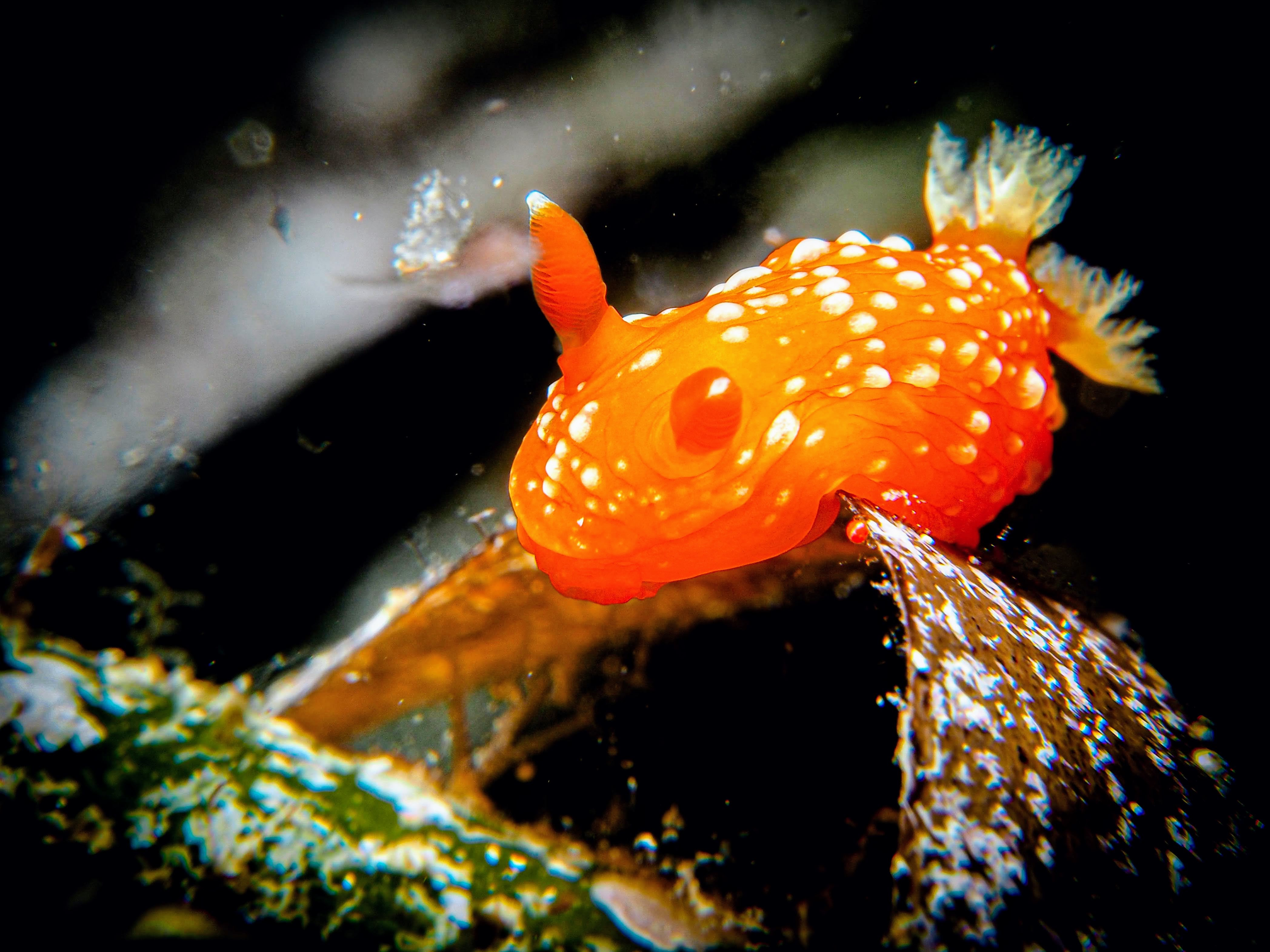

Scientific classification
- Kingdom: Animalia
- Phylum: Mollusca
- Class: Gastropoda
- Order: Nudibranchia
- Family: Polyceridae
- Genus: Martadoris
- Species: M. mediterranea

Binomial name
- Martadoris mediterranea (Domínguez, Pola & Ramón, 2015)

Synonyms
- Tambja mediterranea Domínguez, Pola & Ramón, 2015

= Martadoris mediterranea =

Species of gastropod

Martadoris mediterranea is a species of sea slug, a dorid nudibranch, a marine gastropod mollusc in the family Polyceridae.

== Distribution ==
This species was described from Mallorca and Malta.
