= Martadoris oliva =

Scientific classification
- Kingdom: Animalia
- Phylum: Mollusca
- Class: Gastropoda
- Order: Nudibranchia
- Family: Polyceridae
- Genus: Martadoris
- Species: M. oliva

Binomial name
- Martadoris oliva (Meyer, 1977)

Synonyms
- Tambja oliva Meyer, 1977

Species of gastropod

Martadoris oliva is a species of sea slug, a dorid nudibranch, a marine gastropod mollusc in the family Polyceridae.

== Distribution ==
This species was described from Panama. It has been reported from South Carolina.
