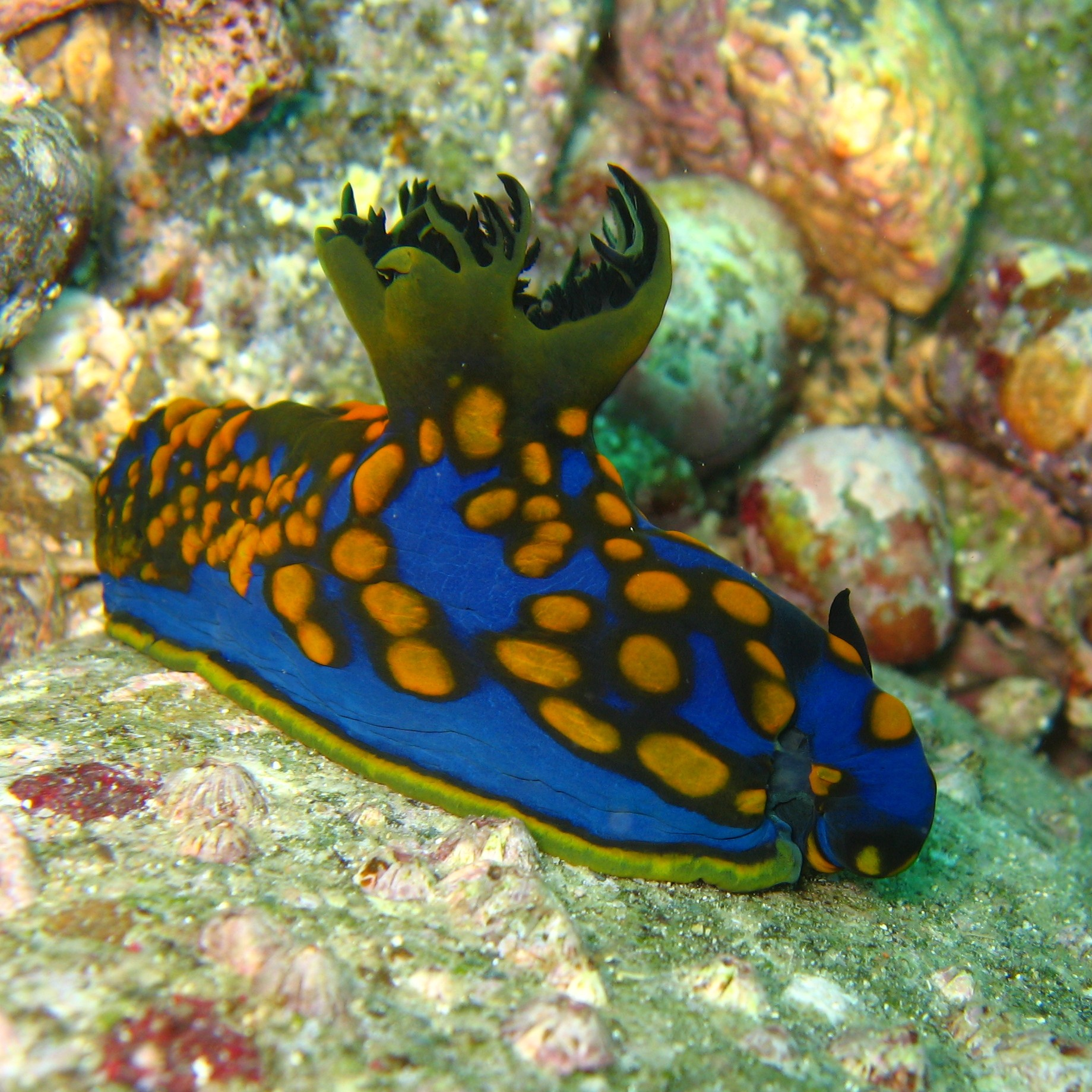
- Tambja sagamiana in Sukumo Bay, Kōchi Prefecture, Japan.

Scientific classification
- Kingdom: Animalia
- Phylum: Mollusca
- Class: Gastropoda
- Order: Nudibranchia
- Family: Polyceridae
- Genus: Tambja
- Species: T. sagamiana

Binomial name
- Tambja sagamiana Baba, 1955

Synonyms
- Nembrotha sagamiana Baba, 1955

= Tambja sagamiana =

Species of gastropod

Tambja sagamiana is a species of colourful sea slug, a dorid nudibranch, a marine gastropod mollusk in the family Polyceridae.

== Distribution ==
This species occurs in the West Pacific Ocean around Japan, Taiwan and Korea.

== Description ==
Tambja sagamiana is blue with yellow to orange pustule-like spots all over its body. The spots are outlined in black. It has green gills and black rhinophores. The foot is yellow. This animal can reach a total length of at least 110 mm.
