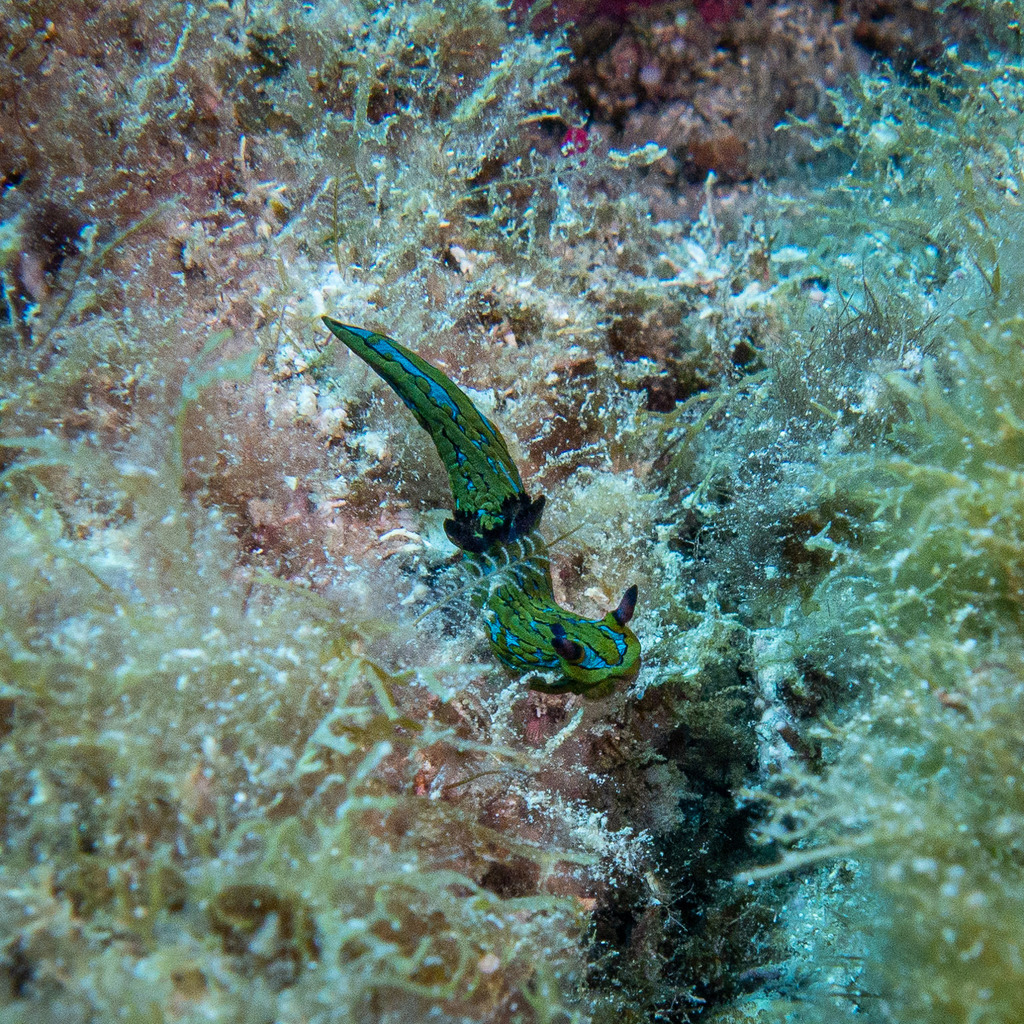

Scientific classification
- Kingdom: Animalia
- Phylum: Mollusca
- Class: Gastropoda
- Order: Nudibranchia
- Family: Polyceridae
- Genus: Tambja
- Species: T. abdere

Binomial name
- Tambja abdere Farmer, 1978

Synonyms
- Tambja fusca Farmer, 1978

= Tambja abdere =

Species of gastropod

Tambja abdere is a species of sea slug, a dorid nudibranch, a marine gastropod mollusk in the family Polyceridae.

== Distribution ==
The type locality of this species is La Paz, Baja California, Mexico. The original description reports additional observations from Punta Lobos, Guaymas, Danzante Island, San Diego Island and San Francisco Island, Mexico.
