= Martadoris divae =

Scientific classification
- Kingdom: Animalia
- Phylum: Mollusca
- Class: Gastropoda
- Order: Nudibranchia
- Family: Polyceridae
- Genus: Martadoris
- Species: M. divae

Binomial name
- Martadoris divae (Marcus, Er., 1958)

Synonyms
- Nembrotha divae Marcus, Er., 1958; Tambja divae (Marcus, Er., 1958)

Species of gastropod

Martadoris divae is a species of sea slug, a dorid nudibranch, a marine gastropod mollusc in the family Polyceridae.

== Distribution ==
This species was described from Arraial do Cabo, Cabo Frio, Brazil.
