= Roboastra rubropapulosa =

Scientific classification
- Kingdom: Animalia
- Phylum: Mollusca
- Class: Gastropoda
- Order: Nudibranchia
- Family: Polyceridae
- Genus: Roboastra
- Species: R. rubropapulosa

Binomial name
- Roboastra rubropapulosa (Bergh, 1905)

Synonyms
- Nembrotha rubropapulosa Bergh, 1905

Species of gastropod

Roboastra rubropapulosa is a species of sea slug, a polycerid nudibranch, a marine gastropod mollusc in the family Polyceridae.

== Distribution ==
This species was described from Pulu Pasi Tanette, Sulawesi, Indonesia, 5.756238°S 120.489166°E.
