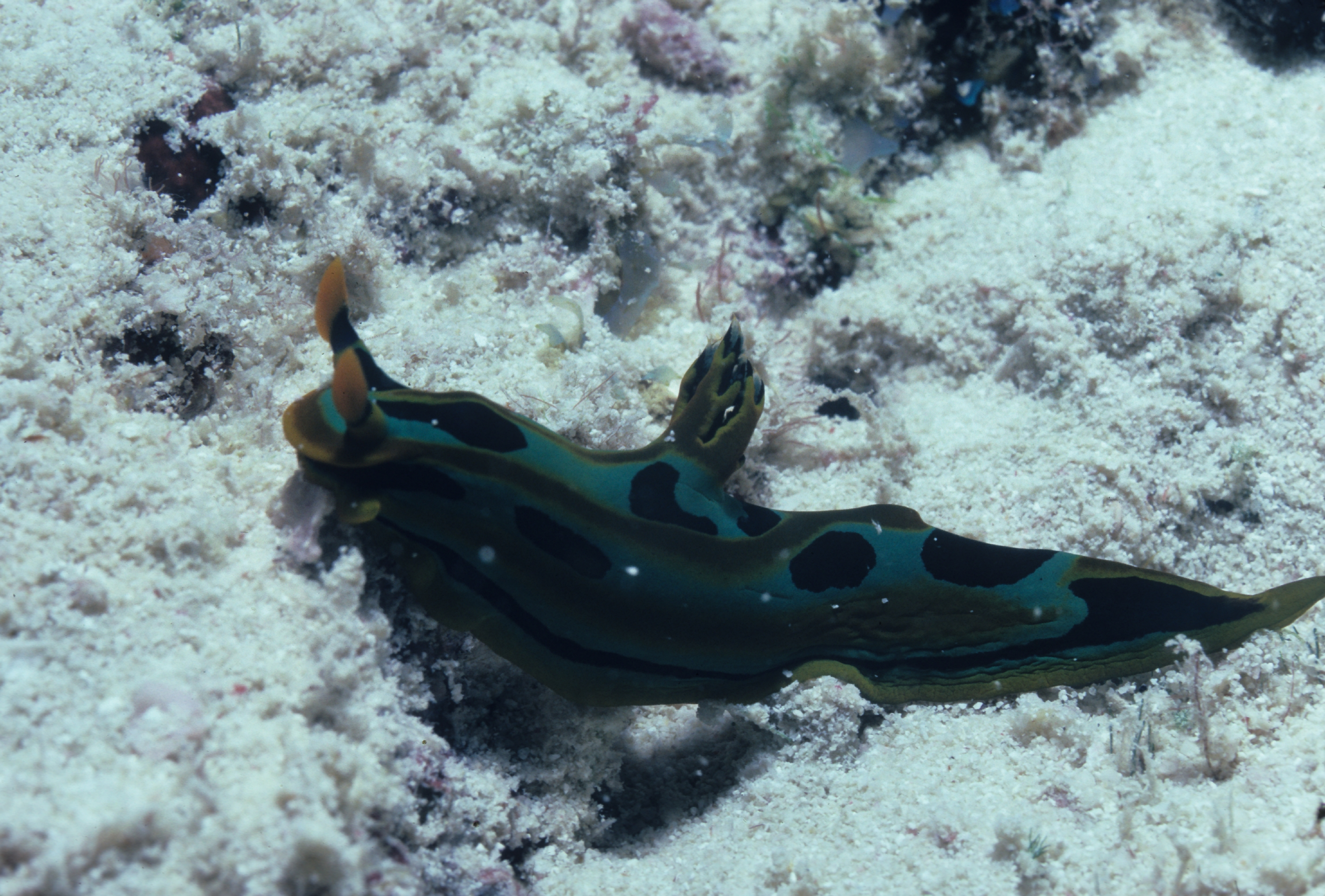

Scientific classification
- Kingdom: Animalia
- Phylum: Mollusca
- Class: Gastropoda
- Order: Nudibranchia
- Family: Polyceridae
- Genus: Tambja
- Species: T. blacki

Binomial name
- Tambja blacki Pola, Cervera & Gosliner, 2006

= Tambja blacki =

Species of gastropod

Tambja blacki is a species of sea slug, a dorid nudibranch, a marine gastropod mollusk in the family Polyceridae.

== Distribution ==
This species was originally described from Papua New Guinea and eastern Australia.
