= Tambja crioula =

Scientific classification
- Kingdom: Animalia
- Phylum: Mollusca
- Class: Gastropoda
- Order: Nudibranchia
- Family: Polyceridae
- Genus: Tambja
- Species: T. crioula

Binomial name
- Tambja crioula Pola, Padula, Gosliner & Cervera, 2014

Species of gastropod

Tambja crioula is a species of sea slug, a dorid nudibranch, a marine gastropod mollusk in the family Polyceridae.

== Distribution ==
This species was originally described from Cape Verde.
