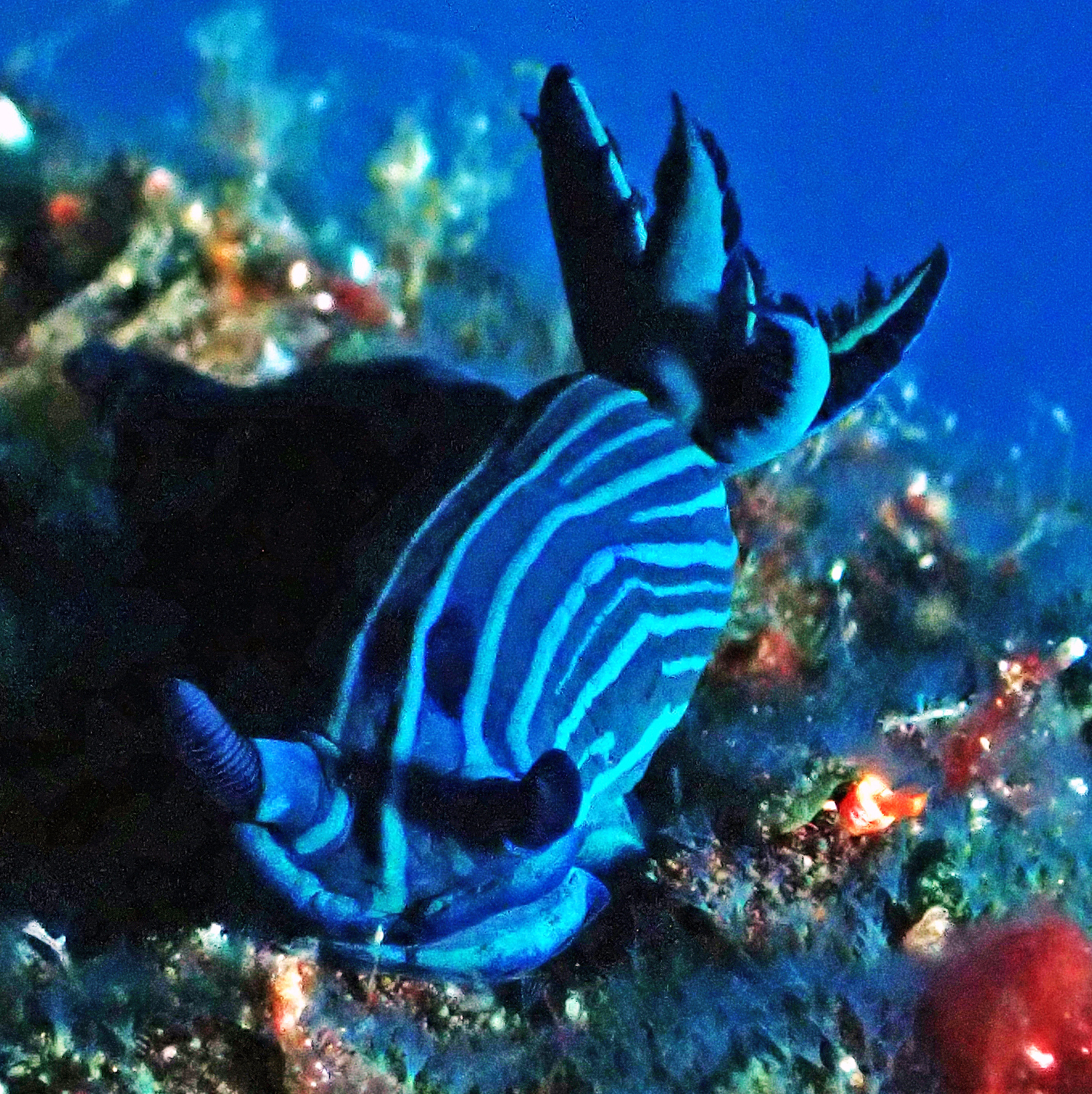
- Tambja mullineri from Galapagos

Scientific classification
- Domain: Eukaryota
- Kingdom: Animalia
- Phylum: Mollusca
- Class: Gastropoda
- Order: Nudibranchia
- Superfamily: Polyceroidea
- Family: Polyceridae
- Genus: Tambja
- Species: T. mullineri

Binomial name
- Tambja mullineri Farmer, 1978

= Tambja mullineri =

Species of sea slug

Tambja mullineri is a species of sea slug, a dorid nudibranch, a marine gastropod mollusk in the family Polyceridae.

== Etymology ==
The species name honors the naturalist and photographer David K. Mulliner.

== Distribution and habitat ==
This species is endemic to Galapagos Islands. It inhabits rocky areas on wall faces.

== Description ==
Tambja mullineri can reach a maximum length of about 20 millimetres (0.79 in). It shows light blue longitudinal stripes on a blue background. The five gill lamellae are dark blue, with light blue outer face of each gill.

== Bibliography ==
- Farmer, W. M. (1978). "Tambja and Roboastra (Mollusca: Opisthobranchia) from the Gulf of California and the Galapagos Islands". The Veliger. 20 (4): 375–385.
