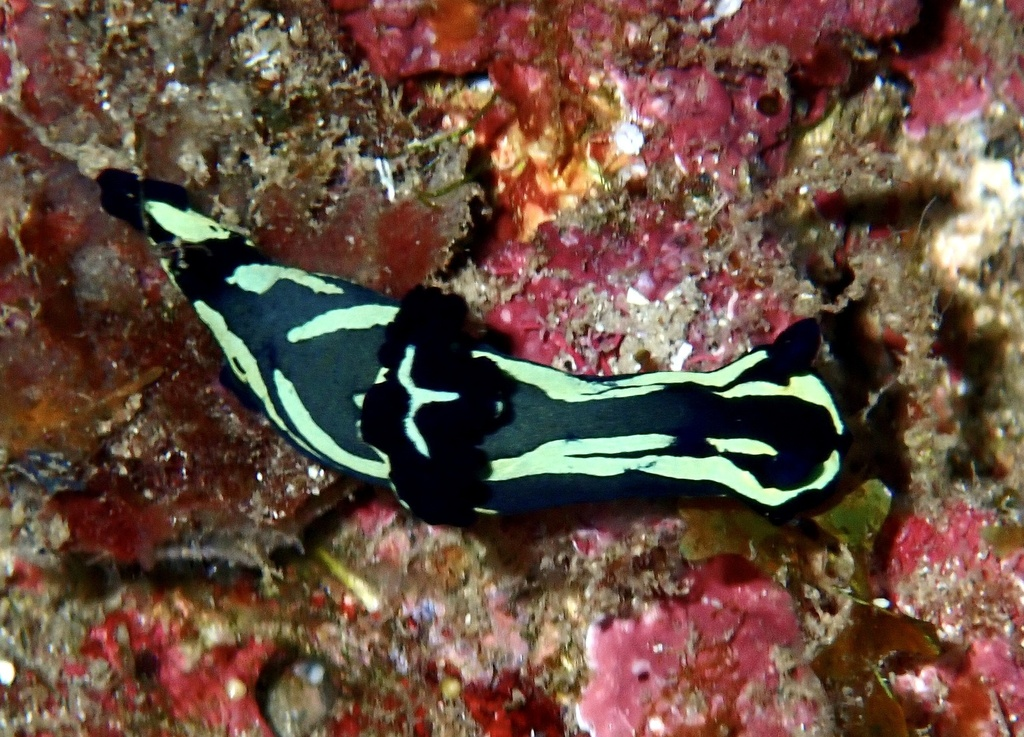

Scientific classification
- Kingdom: Animalia
- Phylum: Mollusca
- Class: Gastropoda
- Order: Nudibranchia
- Family: Polyceridae
- Genus: Tambja
- Species: T. fantasmalis

Binomial name
- Tambja fantasmalis Ortea & García-Gómez, 1986

= Tambja fantasmalis =

Species of gastropod

Tambja fantasmalis is a species of sea slug, a dorid nudibranch, a marine gastropod mollusk in the family Polyceridae.

== Distribution ==
This species was originally described from Cape Verde.
