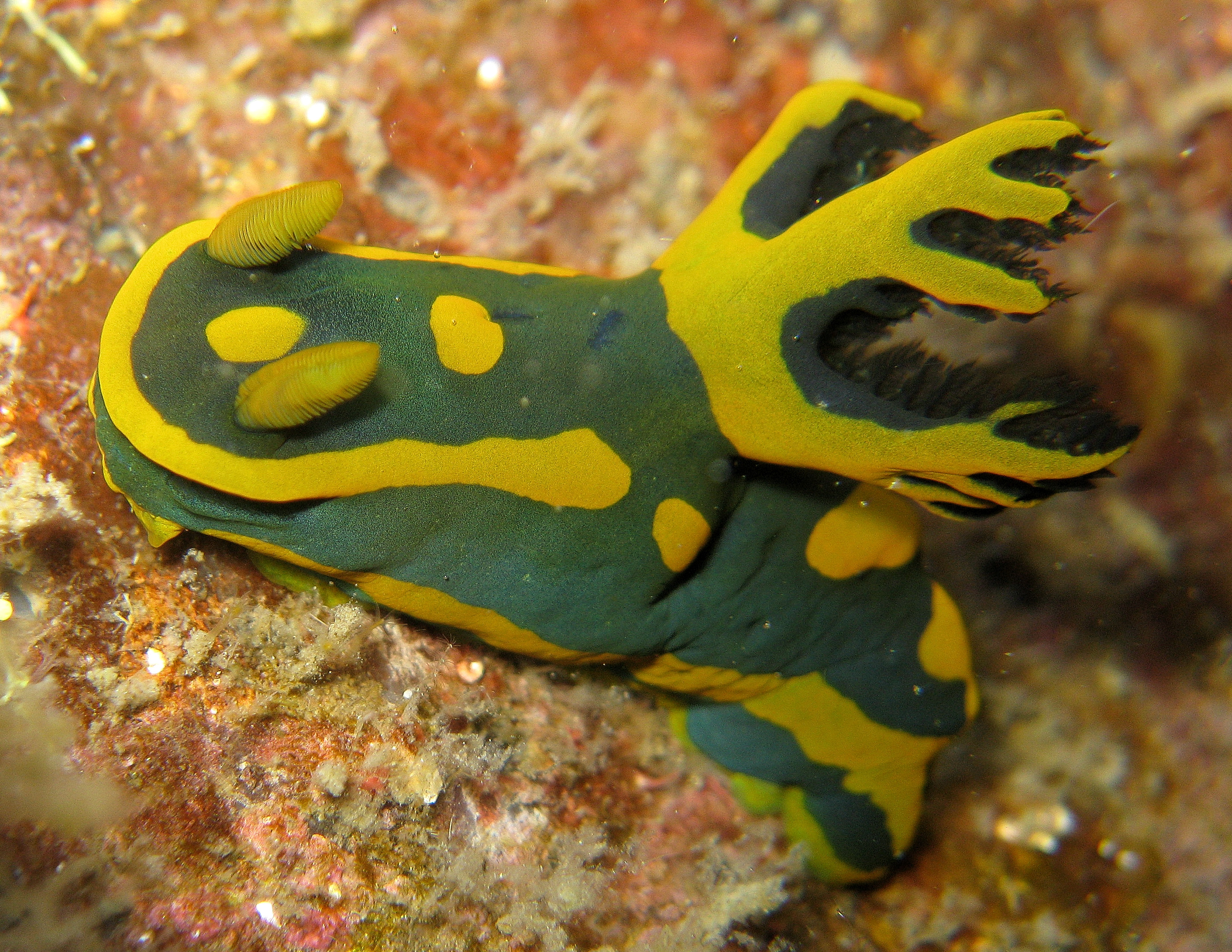
- Tambja gabrielae, head end towards the left

Scientific classification
- Kingdom: Animalia
- Phylum: Mollusca
- Class: Gastropoda
- Order: Nudibranchia
- Family: Polyceridae
- Genus: Tambja
- Species: T. gabrielae

Binomial name
- Tambja gabrielae Pola, Cervera & Gosliner, 2005

= Tambja gabrielae =

Species of gastropod

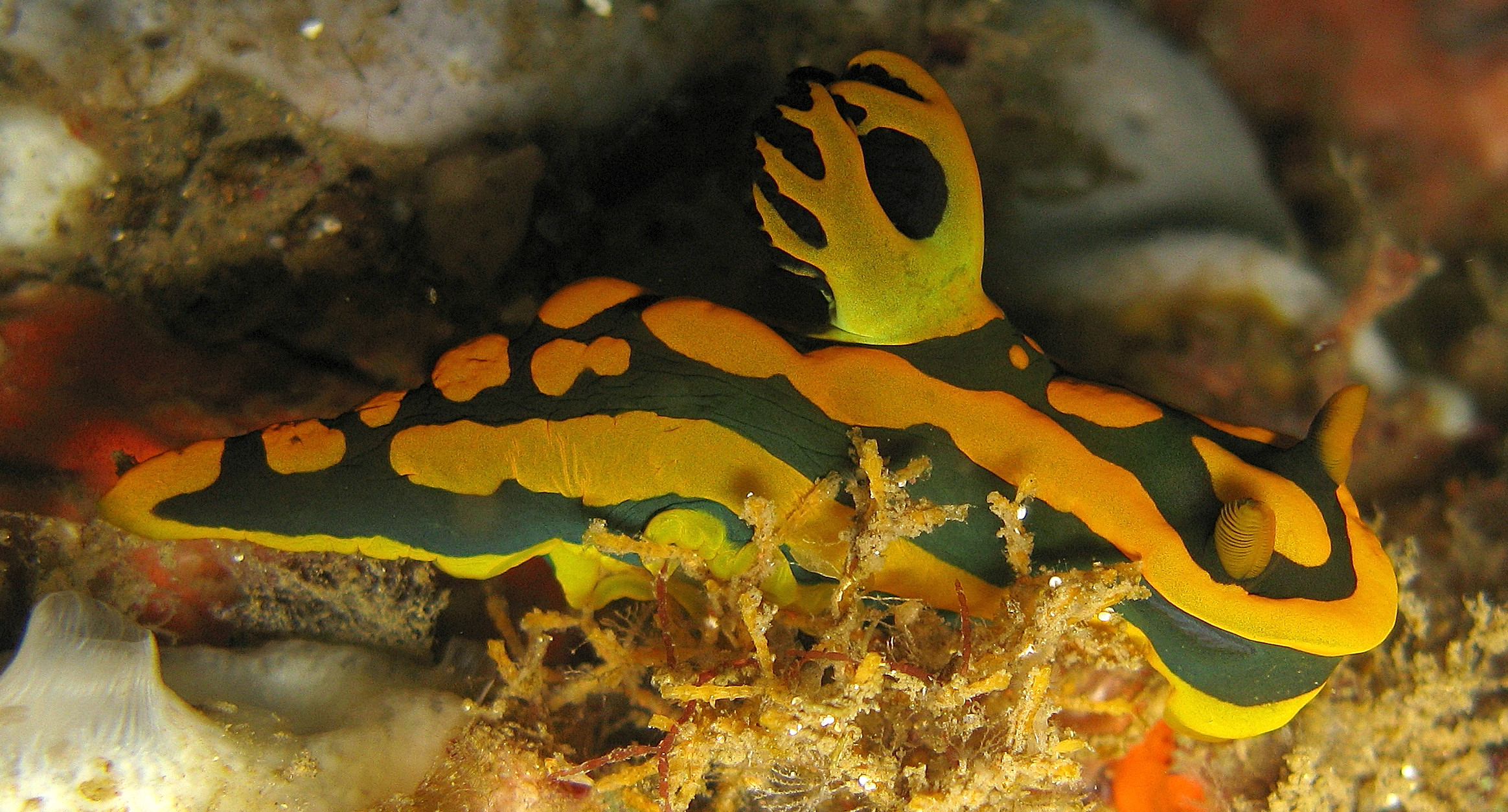
Side view of Tambja gabrielae

Tambja gabrielae is a species of sea slug, a dorid nudibranch, a marine gastropod mollusk in the family Polyceridae.

== Distribution ==
This species is found in Sulawesi (Indonesia), Philippines and Papua New Guinea.

== Description ==
Tambja gabrielae has bright yellow or orange spots on a dark green to almost black background.
