= Roboastra arika =

Scientific classification
- Kingdom: Animalia
- Phylum: Mollusca
- Class: Gastropoda
- Order: Nudibranchia
- Family: Polyceridae
- Genus: Roboastra
- Species: R. arika

Binomial name
- Roboastra arika Burn, 1967

Species of gastropod

Roboastra arika is a species of sea slug, a polycerid nudibranch, a marine gastropod mollusc in the family Polyceridae.

== Distribution ==
This species was described from Lord Howe Island, Australia.
