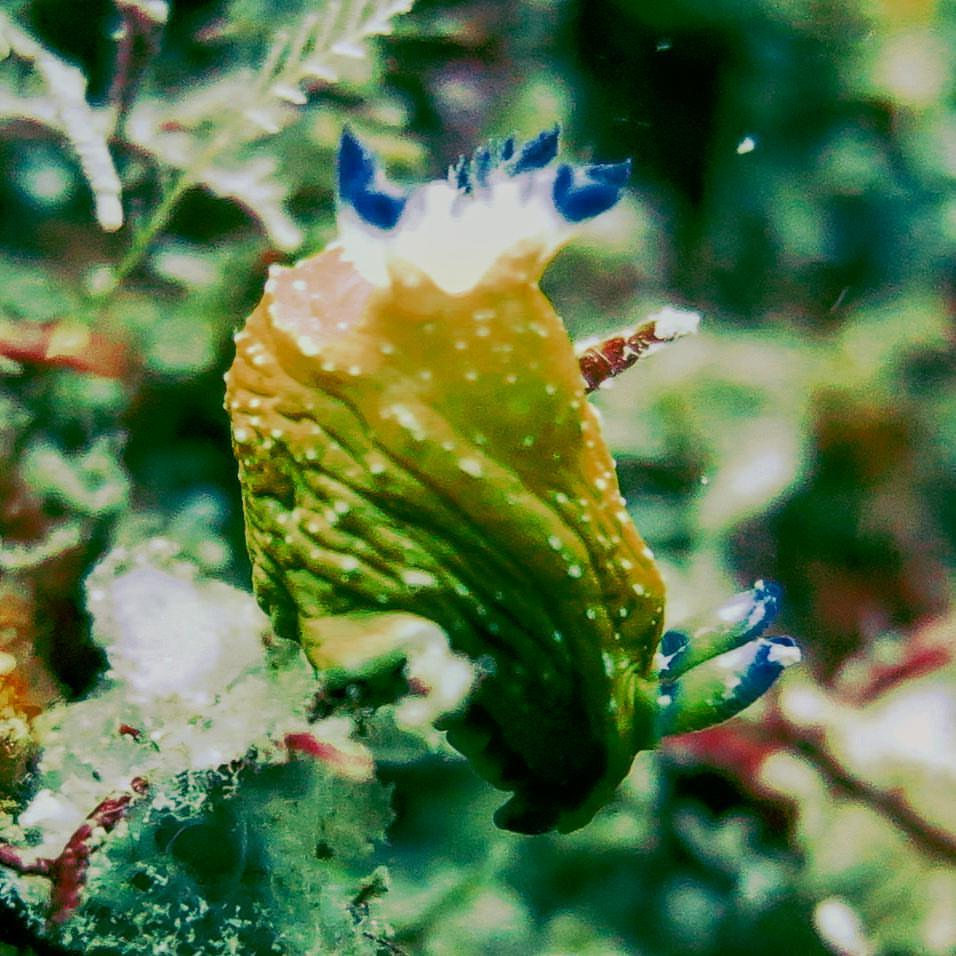

Scientific classification
- Kingdom: Animalia
- Phylum: Mollusca
- Class: Gastropoda
- Order: Nudibranchia
- Family: Polyceridae
- Genus: Tambja
- Species: T. brasiliensis

Binomial name
- Tambja brasiliensis Pola, Padula, Gosliner & Cervera, 2014

= Tambja brasiliensis =

Species of gastropod

Tambja brasiliensis is a species of colourful sea slug, a dorid nudibranch, a marine gastropod mollusc in the family Polyceridae.

== Distribution ==
This species was described from south-eastern and southern Brazil.
