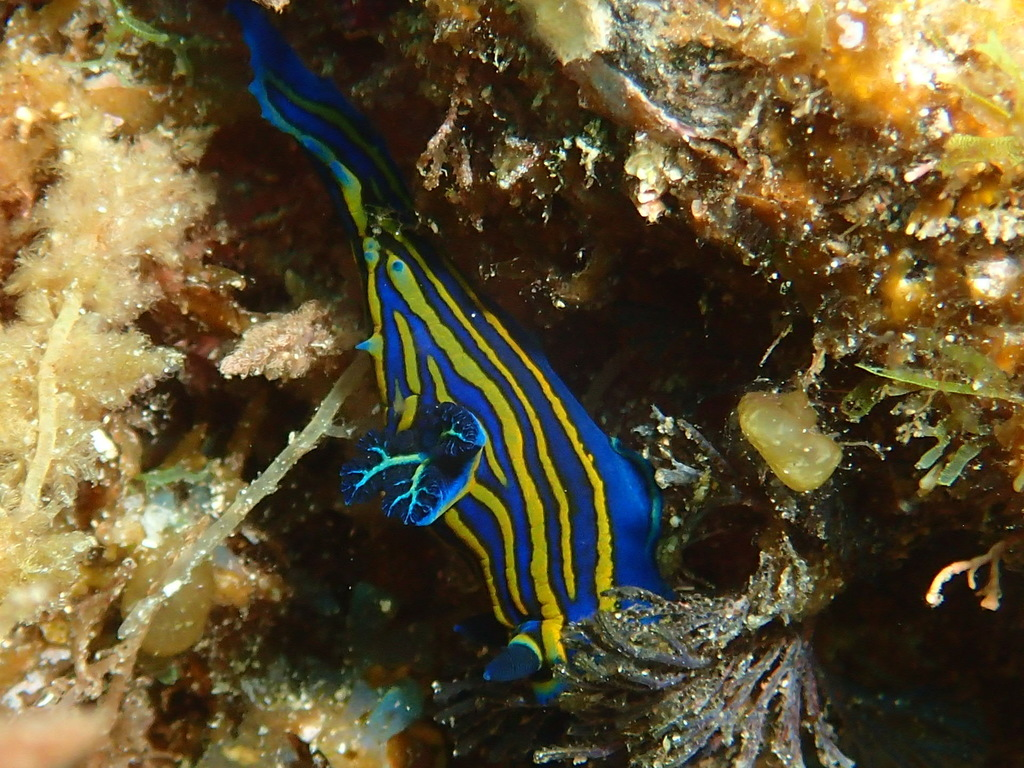

Scientific classification
- Kingdom: Animalia
- Phylum: Mollusca
- Class: Gastropoda
- Order: Nudibranchia
- Family: Polyceridae
- Genus: Tambja
- Species: T. ceutae

Binomial name
- Tambja ceutae García-Gómez & Ortea, 1988

= Tambja ceutae =

Species of gastropod

Tambja ceutae is a species of sea slug, a dorid nudibranch, a marine gastropod mollusk in the family Polyceridae.

== Distribution ==
This species was originally described from Ceuta in the Strait of Gibraltar, Atlantic Ocean.
