= Tambja caeruleocirrus =

Scientific classification
- Kingdom: Animalia
- Phylum: Mollusca
- Class: Gastropoda
- Order: Nudibranchia
- Family: Polyceridae
- Genus: Tambja
- Species: T. caeruleocirrus

Binomial name
- Tambja caeruleocirrus Willan & Y.-W. Chang, 2017

Species of gastropod

Tambja caeruleocirrus is a species of sea slug, a dorid nudibranch, a marine gastropod mollusk in the family Polyceridae.

== Distribution ==
This species was originally described from the Coral Sea, Australia.
