= Tambja diaphana =

Scientific classification
- Kingdom: Animalia
- Phylum: Mollusca
- Class: Gastropoda
- Order: Nudibranchia
- Family: Polyceridae
- Genus: Tambja
- Species: T. diaphana

Binomial name
- Tambja diaphana (Bergh, 1877)

Species of gastropod

Tambja diaphana is a species of sea slug, a dorid nudibranch, a marine gastropod mollusk in the family Polyceridae.

== Distribution ==
This species was originally described from Aibukit. It is considered to be unrecognisable.
