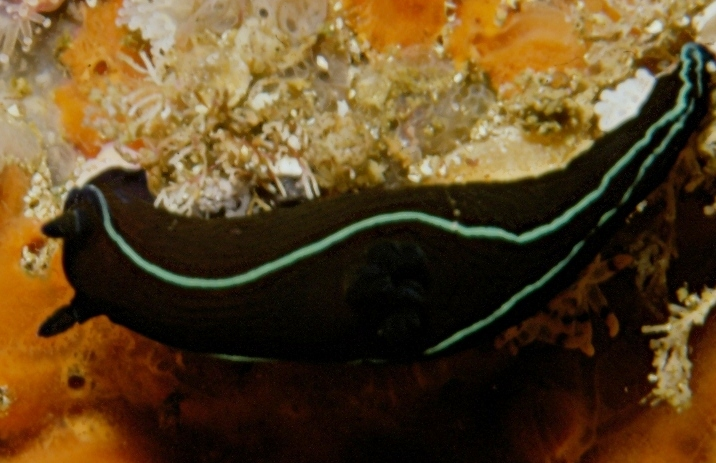
- A live individual of Tambja capensis, head end towards the left

Scientific classification
- Kingdom: Animalia
- Phylum: Mollusca
- Class: Gastropoda
- Order: Nudibranchia
- Family: Polyceridae
- Genus: Tambja
- Species: T. capensis

Binomial name
- Tambja capensis (Bergh, 1907)

Synonyms
- Nembrotha capensis Bergh, 1907

= Black nudibranch =

Species of gastropod

The black nudibranch (Tambja capensis) is a species of colorful sea slug, a dorid nudibranch, a shell-less marine gastropod mollusk in the family Polyceridae. This species is endemic to South Africa.

== Distribution ==
This species is endemic to the South African coast, being found from the Atlantic coast of the Cape Peninsula to Port Elizabeth from the shallow subtidal to at least 30 m.

== Description ==
The black nudibranch is a large (up to 80 mm) deep-bodied nudibranch. It is easily recognised because of its blue-black colour and bright turquoise marginal line. Some specimens are brownish with a purple marginal line. Its gills and rhinophores are black.

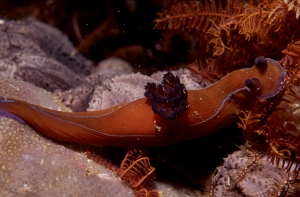
Brown morph of the black nudibranch

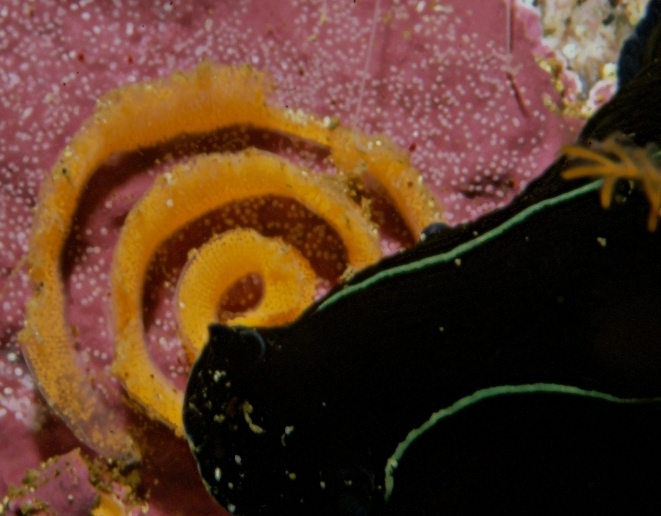
Egg ribbon of the black nudibranch

== Ecology ==
The black nudibranch feeds on tree-like bryozoans. Its egg ribbon is a bright yellow rose-like spiral.
