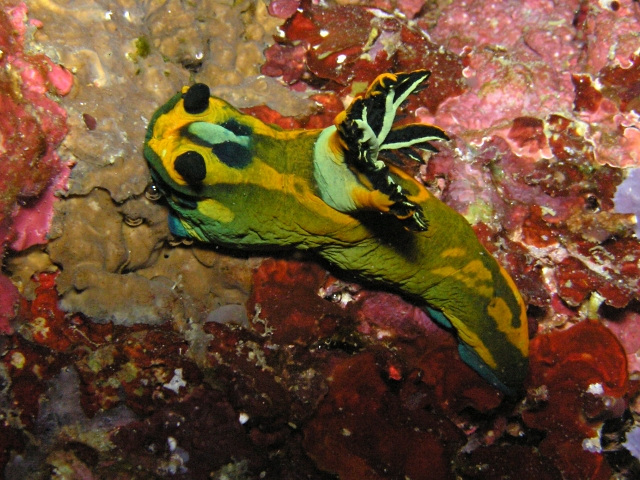
- Tambja olivaria, head end towards the left

Scientific classification
- Kingdom: Animalia
- Phylum: Mollusca
- Class: Gastropoda
- Order: Nudibranchia
- Family: Polyceridae
- Genus: Tambja
- Species: T. olivaria

Binomial name
- Tambja olivaria Yonow, 1994

= Tambja olivaria =

Species of gastropod

Tambja olivaria is a species of sea slug, a dorid nudibranch, a marine gastropod mollusk in the family Polyceridae.

== Distribution ==
This species occurs in the Philippines, Maldives, Thailand, and Taiwan.

== Description ==
Tambja olivaria is characterized by being mainly a dull olive color, hence the name.
