= Tyrannodoris nikolasi =

Scientific classification
- Kingdom: Animalia
- Phylum: Mollusca
- Class: Gastropoda
- Order: Nudibranchia
- Family: Polyceridae
- Genus: Tyrannodoris
- Species: T. nikolasi

Binomial name
- Tyrannodoris nikolasi (Pola, Padula, Gosliner & Cervera, 2014)

Synonyms
- Roboastra nikolasi Pola, Padula, Gosliner & Cervera, 2014

Species of gastropod

Tyrannodoris nikolasi is a species of sea slug, a polycerid nudibranch, a marine gastropod mollusc in the family Polyceridae.

== Distribution ==
This species was described from Vanuatu and Malaysia.

== Description ==
Tyrannodoris nikolasi is a predominantly dark green animal with light green to yellow horizontal stripes or more continuous superficial pigment. The gills and rhinophores are dark blue or violet. It reaches approximately 15 mm in length. Like other nudibranchs in the genus Tyrannodoris, it is carnivorous, feeding on other seaslugs.
