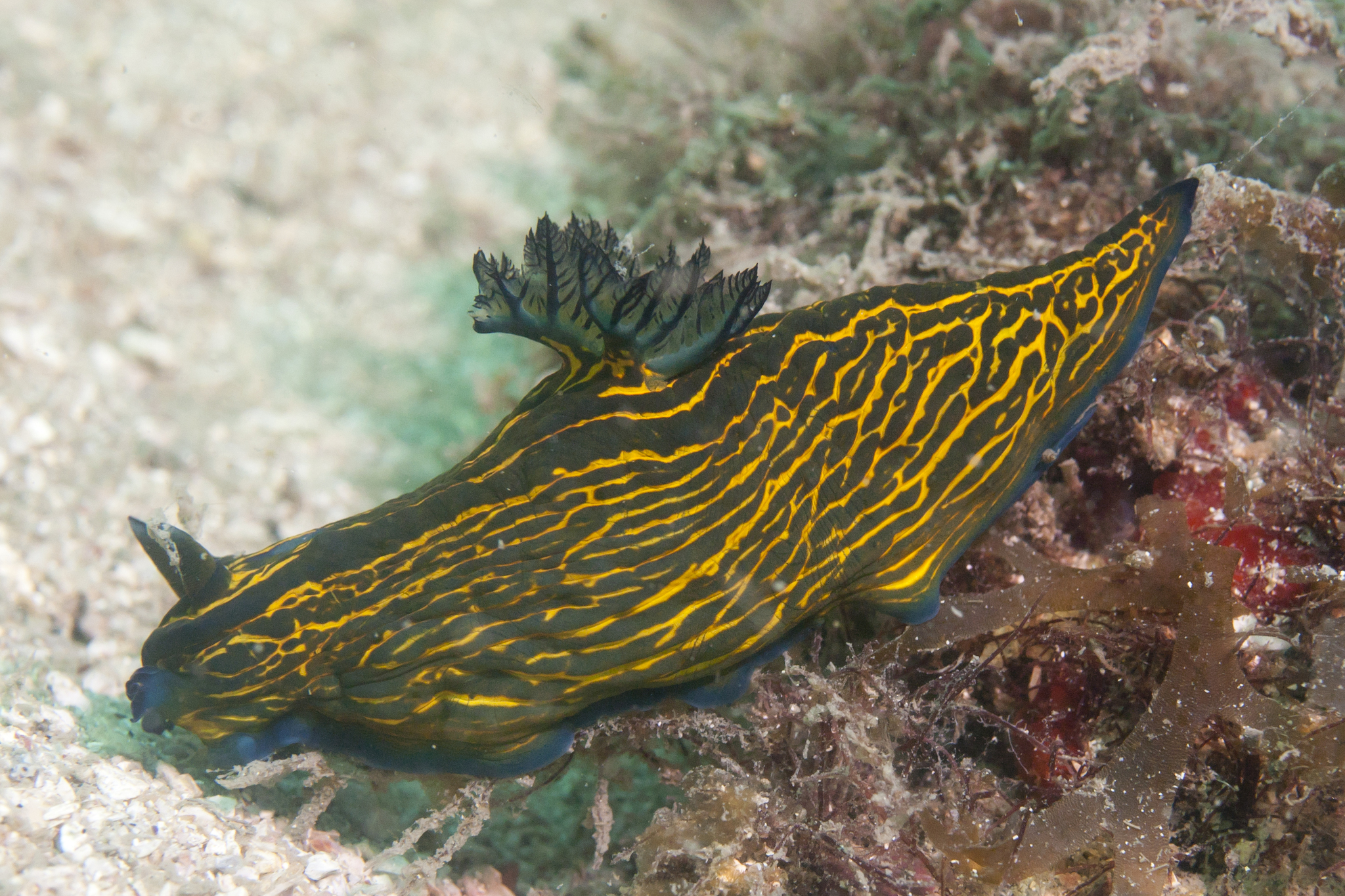

Scientific classification
- Kingdom: Animalia
- Phylum: Mollusca
- Class: Gastropoda
- Order: Nudibranchia
- Family: Polyceridae
- Genus: Tyrannodoris
- Species: T. ernsti

Binomial name
- Tyrannodoris ernsti (Pola, Padula, Gosliner & Cervera, 2014)

Synonyms
- Roboastra ernsti Pola, Padula, Gosliner & Cervera, 2014

= Tyrannodoris ernsti =

Species of gastropod

Tyrannodoris ernsti is a species of sea slug, a polycerid nudibranch, a marine gastropod mollusc in the family Polyceridae.

== Distribution ==
This species was described from south-eastern to southern Brazil.

== Description ==
Tyrannodoris ernsti is a predominantly dark green animal with yellow horizontal lines. The greyish gills and rhinophores are edged with dark blue. It reaches approximately 80 mm in length. Like other nudibranchs in the genus Tyrannodoris, it is carnivorous, feeding on other seaslugs.
