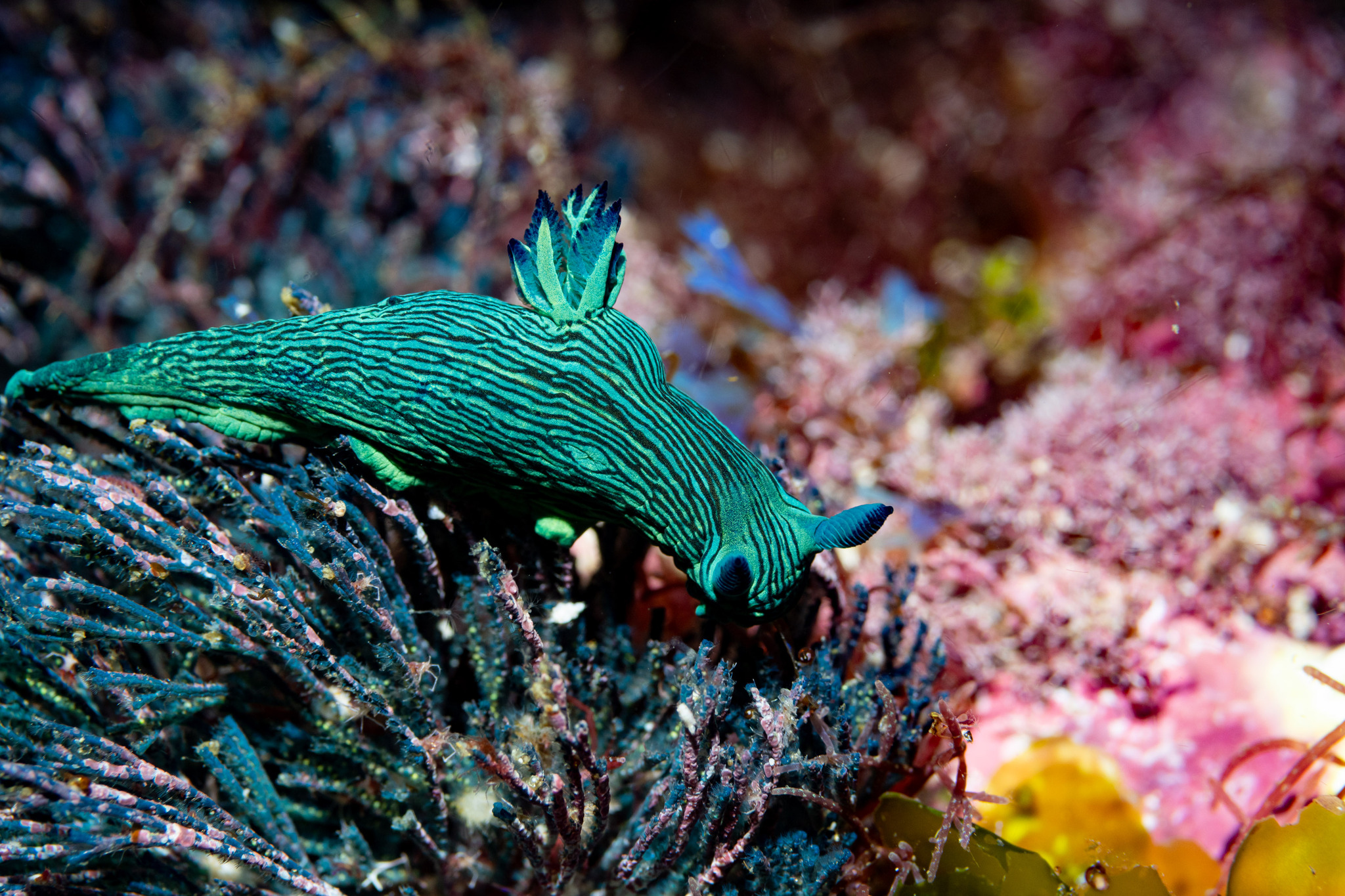

Scientific classification
- Kingdom: Animalia
- Phylum: Mollusca
- Class: Gastropoda
- Order: Nudibranchia
- Family: Polyceridae
- Genus: Tambja
- Species: T. tenuilineata

Binomial name
- Tambja tenuilineata M. C. Miller & Haagh, 2005

= Tambja tenuilineata =

Species of gastropod

Tambja tenuilineata is a species of colourful sea slug, a dorid nudibranch, a marine gastropod mollusk in the family Polyceridae.
