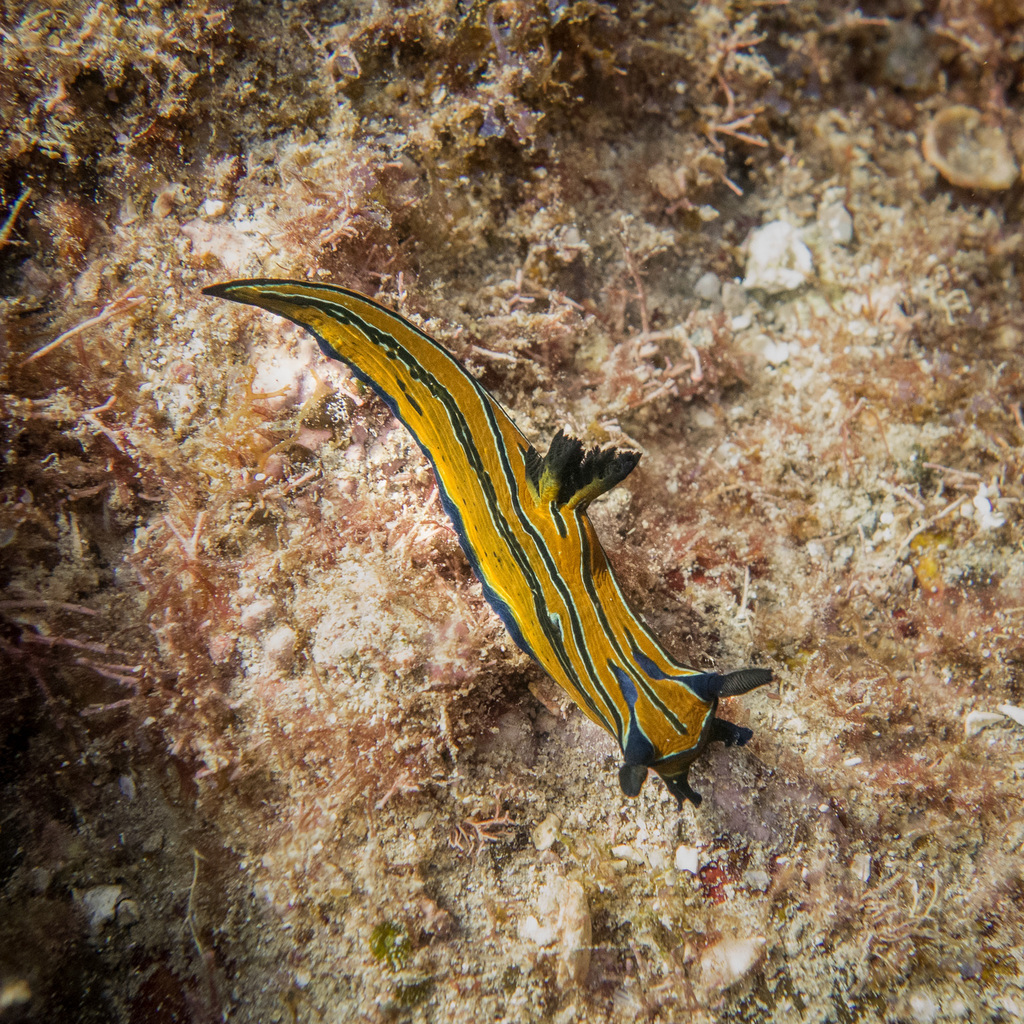

Scientific classification
- Kingdom: Animalia
- Phylum: Mollusca
- Class: Gastropoda
- Order: Nudibranchia
- Family: Polyceridae
- Genus: Tyrannodoris
- Species: T. tigris

Binomial name
- Tyrannodoris tigris (Farmer, 1978)

Synonyms
- Roboastra tigris Farmer, 1978

= Tyrannodoris tigris =

Species of gastropod

Tyrannodoris tigris is a species of sea slug, a polycerid nudibranch, a marine gastropod mollusc in the family Polyceridae. It is a known predator of Tambje eliora and Tambje abdere, two species of smaller nudibranchs. The chemical extracts of all three species contain tambjamines, which were traced to Sessibugula translucens, a food source of these species. It is hypothesized that tambjamines are a chemical defence mechanism against feeding by the spotted kelpfish Gibbonsia elegans.

== Distribution ==
This species is found in the Gulf of California to Bahia de Banderas.

== Description ==
Tyrannodoris tigris can grow as large as 30 cm in length. Like other nudibranchs in the genus Tyrannodoris, it is carnivorous and predatory, feeding on other sea slugs.
