= Tyrannodoris ricei =

Scientific classification
- Kingdom: Animalia
- Phylum: Mollusca
- Class: Gastropoda
- Order: Nudibranchia
- Family: Polyceridae
- Genus: Tyrannodoris
- Species: T. ricei

Binomial name
- Tyrannodoris ricei (Pola, Cervera &Gosliner, 2008)

Synonyms
- Roboastra ricei Pola, Cervera & Gosliner, 2008

Species of gastropod

Tyrannodoris ricei is a species of sea slug, a polycerid nudibranch, a marine gastropod mollusc in the family Polyceridae.

== Distribution ==
This species was described from Florida with additional material from North Carolina.

== Description ==
Tyrannodoris ricei is a predominantly yellow animal with numerous dark blue, almost black spots. The yellow gills and rhinophores are edged with dark blue. It reaches approximately 60 mm in length. Like other nudibranchs in the genus Tyrannodoris, it is carnivorous, feeding on other seaslugs.
