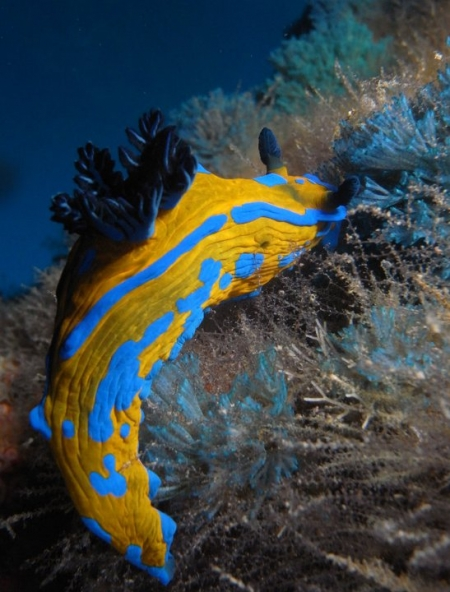

Scientific classification
- Kingdom: Animalia
- Phylum: Mollusca
- Class: Gastropoda
- Order: Nudibranchia
- Family: Polyceridae
- Genus: Tambja
- Species: T. verconis

Binomial name
- Tambja verconis (Basedow and Hedley, 1905)

Synonyms
- Nembrotha verconis Basedow and Heldey, 1905

= Tambja verconis =

Species of gastropod

Tambja verconis, common name Verco's nudibranch, is a species of brightly coloured sea slug, also known as a nudibranch, a marine gastropod mollusk in the family Polyceridae.

This is the type species of the genus Tambja.
