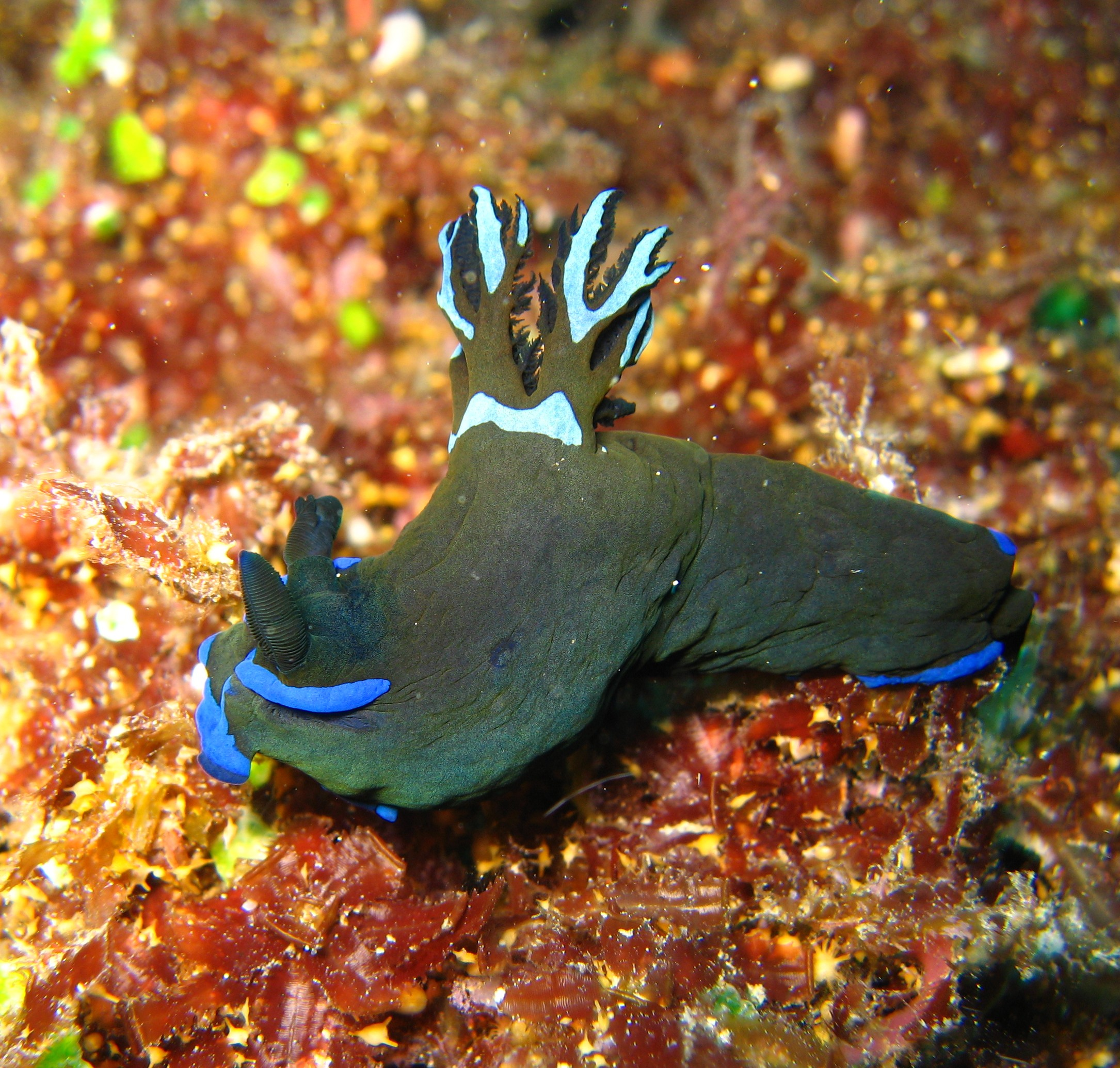
- Tambja morosa in Mactan, Philippines, head end towards the left

Scientific classification
- Kingdom: Animalia
- Phylum: Mollusca
- Class: Gastropoda
- Order: Nudibranchia
- Family: Polyceridae
- Genus: Tambja
- Species: T. morosa

Binomial name
- Tambja morosa (Bergh, 1877)

Synonyms
- Nembrotha morosa Bergh, 1877; Tambja kushimotoensis Baba, 1987

= Tambja morosa =

Species of gastropod

Tambja morosa, also known as Tambja kushimotoensis or gloomy nudibranch, is a species of sea slug, a dorid nudibranch, a shell-less marine gastropod mollusk in the subfamily Nembrothinae within the family Polyceridae.

This species is instead sometimes placed in the family Gymnodorididae.

== Distribution ==
The distribution of this species is primarily Indo-Pacific. It is found in the Philippines, Indonesia, Thailand, Myanmar, Malaysia, New Zealand, Solomon Islands, Taiwan, Australia, French Polynesia, Fiji and Hawaii.

== Description ==
This large species of Tambja grows to approximately 70–75 mm in length. This species is normally black with blue markings, although dark green specimens are found in the cooler waters of New South Wales and northern New Zealand. The skin of this slug is wrinkled, and it appears nearly black underwater. It has approximately five round, blue spots on its back, a blue band around its head, and a bright blue margin.

== Diet ==
Tambja morosa feeds on arborescent bryozoan colonies.
