= Tyrannodoris caboverdensis =

Scientific classification
- Kingdom: Animalia
- Phylum: Mollusca
- Class: Gastropoda
- Order: Nudibranchia
- Family: Polyceridae
- Genus: Tyrannodoris
- Species: T. caboverdensis

Binomial name
- Tyrannodoris caboverdensis (Pola, Cervera & Gosliner, 2003)

Synonyms
- Roboastra caboverdensis Pola, Cervera & Gosliner, 2003

Species of gastropod

Tyrannodoris caboverdensis is a species of sea slug, a polycerid nudibranch, and a marine gastropod mollusc in the family Polyceridae.

== Distribution ==
This species was discovered in the Cape Verde Islands.

== Description ==
Tyrannodoris caboverdensis is a predominantly black animal with horizontal orange lines. It reaches approximately 70 mm in length. Like other nudibranchs in the genus Tyrannodoris, it is carnivorous, feeding on other seaslugs.
