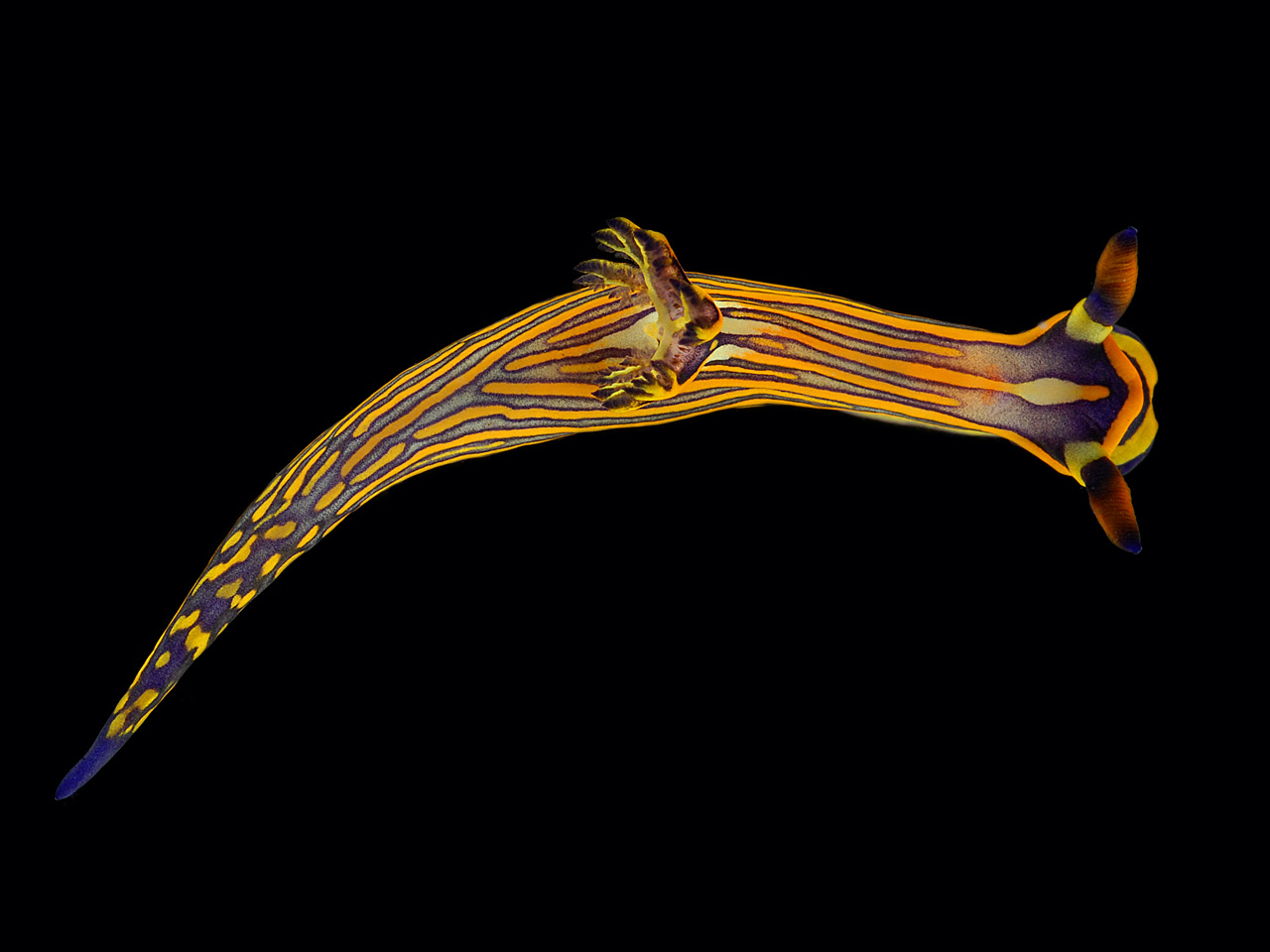
- A live individual of Tambja afinis from Diani, Kenya

Scientific classification
- Kingdom: Animalia
- Phylum: Mollusca
- Class: Gastropoda
- Order: Nudibranchia
- Family: Polyceridae
- Genus: Tambja
- Species: T. affinis

Binomial name
- Tambja affinis Eliot, 1904

Synonyms
- Nembrotha affinis

= Tambja affinis =

Species of gastropod

Tambja affinis is a species of sea slug, a dorid nudibranch, a marine gastropod mollusk in the family Polyceridae.

== Distribution ==
This species was originally described from a specimen found at Zanzibar, East Africa. It has been reported from various sites in the Indian Ocean, as far east as Ningaloo Reef, western Australia

== Description ==
Tambja affinis has bright yellow stripes on a blue background.
