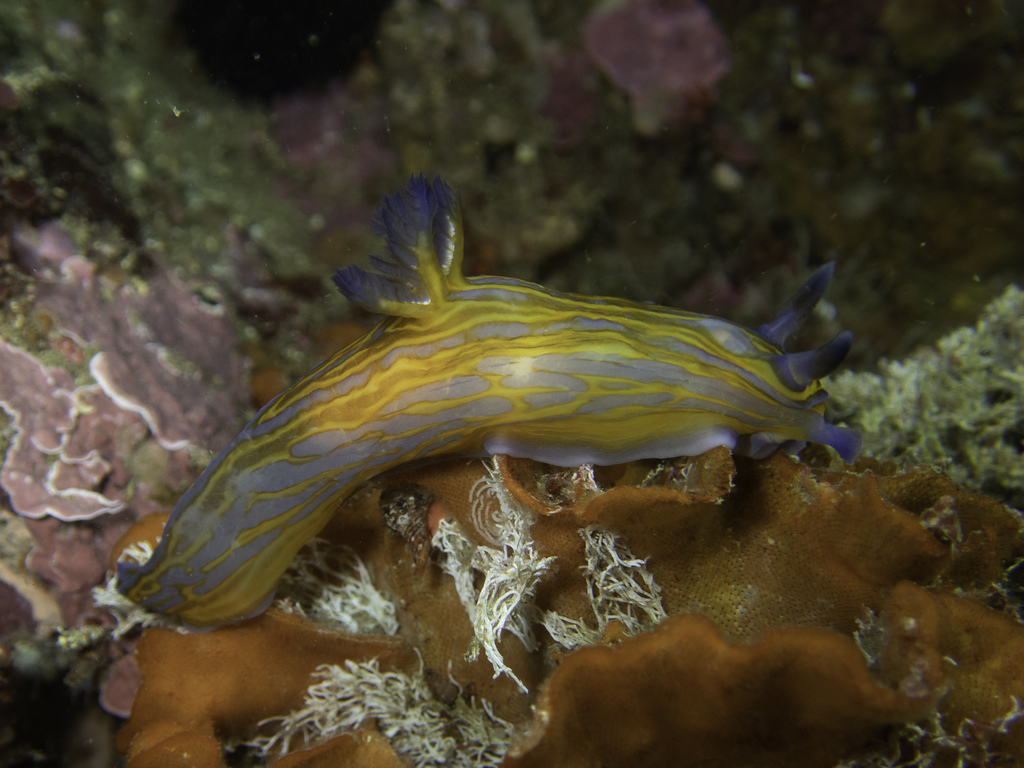
- Tyrannodoris europaea, pale form

Scientific classification
- Kingdom: Animalia
- Phylum: Mollusca
- Class: Gastropoda
- Order: Nudibranchia
- Family: Polyceridae
- Genus: Tyrannodoris
- Species: T. europaea

Binomial name
- Tyrannodoris europaea (García-Gómez, 1985)

Synonyms
- Roboastra europaea García-Gómez, 1985

= Tyrannodoris europaea =

Species of gastropod

Tyrannodoris europaea, is a species of sea slug, a polycerid nudibranch, a marine gastropod mollusc in the family Polyceridae.

The size of this nudibranch's mitochondrial DNA is 14,472 bp, which is one of the smallest among the Metazoa.

== Distribution ==
This species was described from the Strait of Gibraltar, Spain. It is found in the Mediterranean Sea and adjacent Atlantic Ocean including the Azores and Canary Islands.
