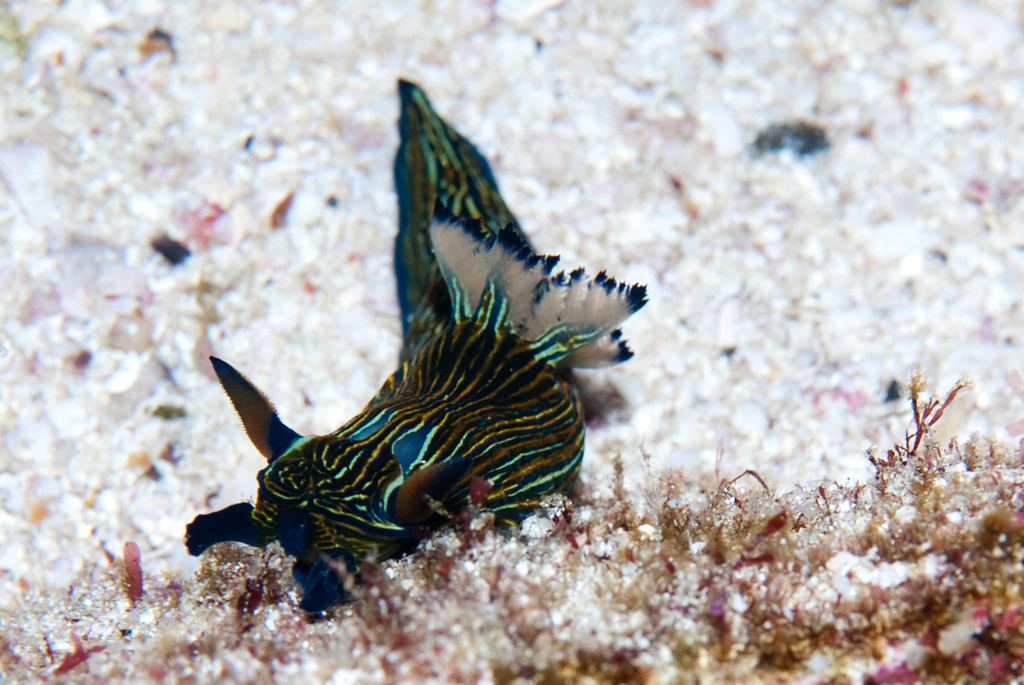

Scientific classification
- Kingdom: Animalia
- Phylum: Mollusca
- Class: Gastropoda
- Order: Nudibranchia
- Family: Polyceridae
- Genus: Tyrannodoris
- Species: T. leonis

Binomial name
- Tyrannodoris leonis (Pola, Cervera & Gosliner, 2005)

Synonyms
- Roboastra leonis Pola, Cervera & Gosliner, 2005

= Tyrannodoris leonis =

Species of gastropod

Tyrannodoris leonis is a species of sea slug, a polycerid nudibranch, a marine gastropod mollusc in the family Polyceridae.

== Distribution ==
This species was described from the Galapagos Islands. It is also found in the Eastern Pacific Ocean, from Costa Rica to the Gulf of California.

== Description ==
Tyrannodoris leonis reaches approximately 30 mm in length. Like other nudibranchs in the genus Tyrannodoris, it is carnivorous, feeding on other seaslugs.
