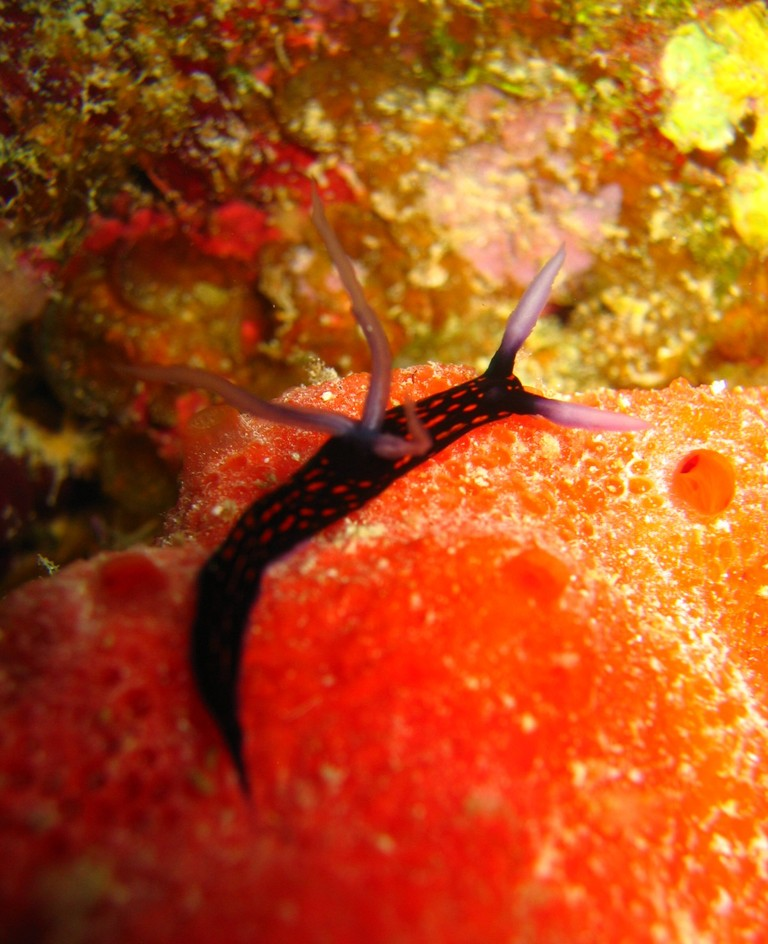
- Roboastra gracilis

Scientific classification
- Kingdom: Animalia
- Phylum: Mollusca
- Class: Gastropoda
- Order: Nudibranchia
- Family: Polyceridae
- Genus: Roboastra
- Species: R. gracilis

Binomial name
- Roboastra gracilis (Bergh, 1877)

= Roboastra gracilis =

Species of gastropod

Roboastra gracilis is a species of sea slug, a polycerid nudibranch, a marine gastropod mollusc in the family Polyceridae.

== Distribution ==
This sea slug is found in the tropical western Pacific Ocean.

== Description ==
Robastra gracilis is a relatively small nudibranch reaching only 20–25 mm (2-2.5 cm) in length.
