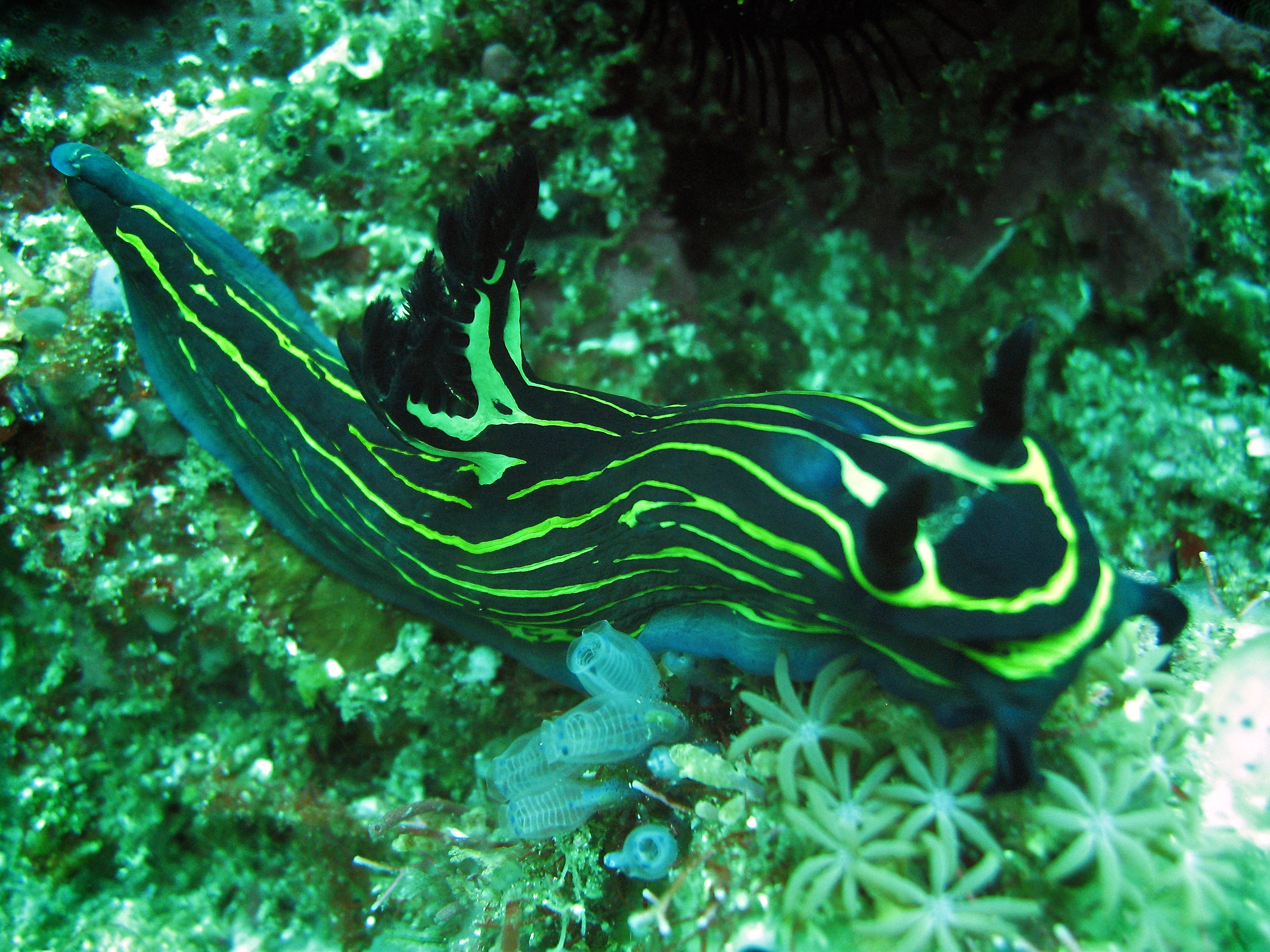
- Tyrannodoris luteolineata in Komodo, Indonesia.

Scientific classification
- Kingdom: Animalia
- Phylum: Mollusca
- Class: Gastropoda
- Order: Nudibranchia
- Family: Polyceridae
- Subfamily: Nembrothinae
- Genus: Tyrannodoris; Willan & Chang, 2017

Species
- See text

= Tyrannodoris =

Genus of gastropods

Tyrannodoris is a genus of sea slugs, polycerid nudibranchs, marine gastropod molluscs in the family Polyceridae. Most of these species were formerly considered to belong to the genus Roboastra. They are carnivorous, feeding on other species of nudibranch, seemingly mostly other Polycerids.

== Species ==
Species in the genus Tyrannodoris include:

- Tyrannodoris caboverdensis (Pola, Cervera & Gosliner, 2003)
- Tyrannodoris ernsti (Pola, Padula, Gosliner & Cervera, 2014)
- Tyrannodoris europaea (García-Gómez, 1985)
- Tyrannodoris leonis (Pola, Cervera & Gosliner, 2005)
- Tyrannodoris luteolineata (Baba, 1936)
- Tyrannodoris nikolasi (Pola, Padula, Gosliner & Cervera, 2014)
- Tyrannodoris ricei (Pola, Cervera & Gosliner, 2008)
- Tyrannodoris tigris (Farmer, 1978)
