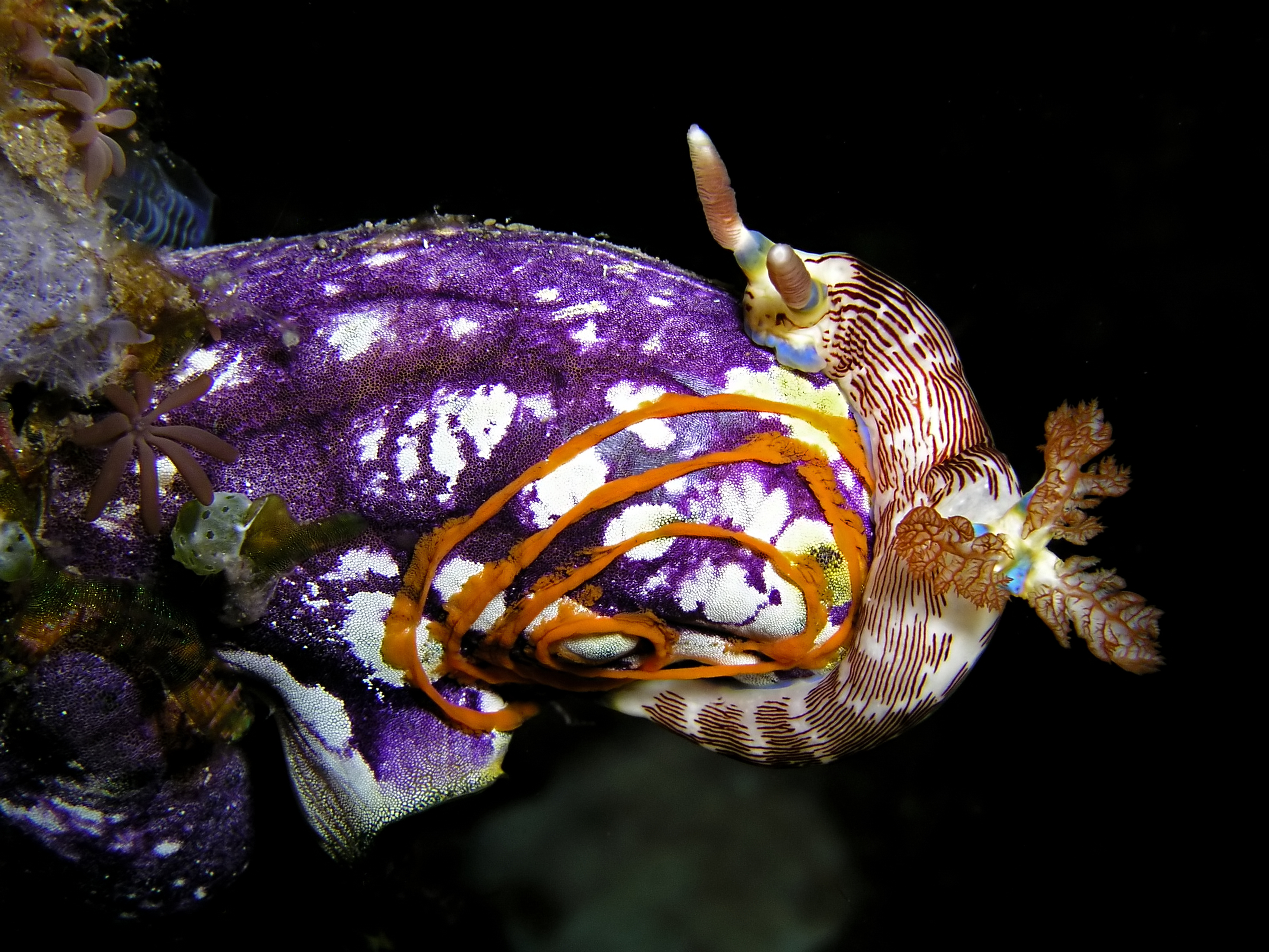
- Nembrotha lineolata (to the right with head uppermost) laying a bright orange egg spiral on a purple and white sea squirt Polycarpa aurata, (to the left).
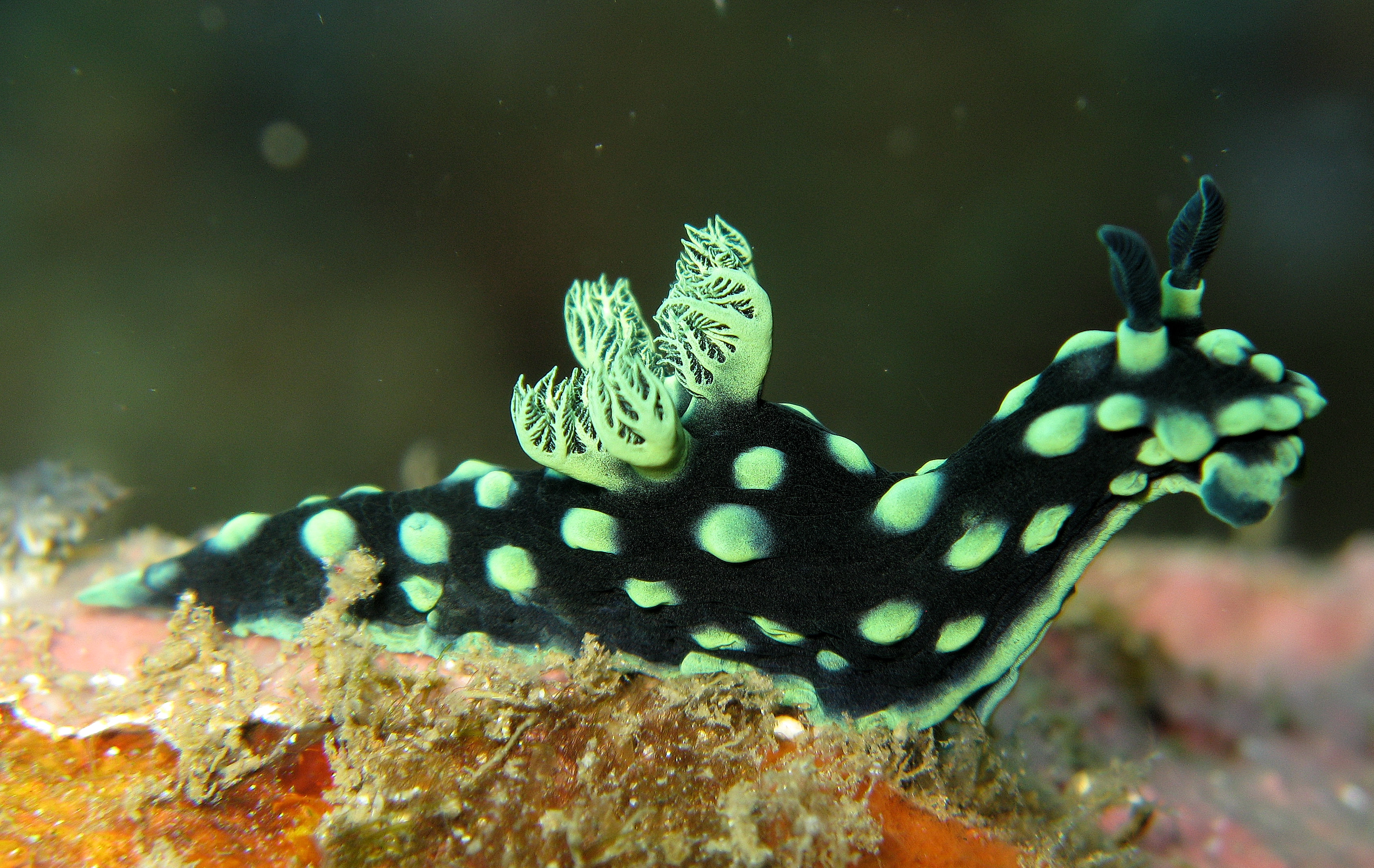
- Nembrotha cristata

Scientific classification
- Kingdom: Animalia
- Phylum: Mollusca
- Class: Gastropoda
- Order: Nudibranchia
- Family: Polyceridae
- Subfamily: Nembrothinae
- Genus: Nembrotha; Bergh, 1877

= Nembrotha =

Genus of gastropods

Nembrotha is a genus of sea slugs, nudibranchs, marine gastropod molluscs in the family Polyceridae.

Nembrotha is the type genus of the subfamily Nembrothinae.

== Species ==
Species in the genus Nembrotha include:

- Nembrotha aurea Pola, Cervera & Gosliner, 2008
- Nembrotha caerulea Eliot,1904 - Uncertain
- Nembrotha chamberlaini Gosliner & Behrens, 1997
- Nembrotha cristata Bergh, 1877
- Nembrotha kubaryana Bergh, 1877
- Nembrotha lineolata Bergh, 1905
- Nembrotha livingstonei Sllan, 1933
- Nembrotha lorosae Pola, Paz-Sedano, Martín, L. Warren, Noble & Martín-Hervás, 2026
- Nembrotha megalocera Yonow, 1990
- Nembrotha milleri Gosliner & Behrens, 1997
- Nembrotha mullineri Gosliner & Behrens, 1997
- Nembrotha purpureolineata O'Donoghue, 1924
- Nembrotha rosannulata Pola, Cervera & Gosliner, 2008

Species brought into synonymy

- Nembrotha affinis Eliot, 1904: synonym of Tambja affinis
- Nembrotha amitina Bergh, 1905: synonym of Tambja amitina
- Nembrotha arnoldi Burn, 1957 : synonym of Gymnodoris arnoldi
- Nembrotha capensis Bergh, 1907: synonym of Tambja capensis
- Nembrotha diaphana Bergh, 1877: synonym of Tambja diaphana
- Nembrotha divae Er. Marcus, 1958: synonym of Martadoris divae
- Nembrotha edwardsi Angas, 1864: synonym of Crimora edwardsi
- Nembrotha eliora Er. Marcus & Ev. Marcus, 1967: synonym of Tambja eliora
- Nembrotha gracilis Bergh, 1877: synonym of Roboastra gracilis
- Nembrotha gratiosa Bergh, 1890: synonym of Tambja gratiosa
- Nembrotha guttata Yonow, 1993: synonym of Nembrotha cristata Bergh, 1877
- Nembrotha hubbsi Lance, 1968: synonym of Tambja eliora Er. Marcus & Ev. Marcus, 1967
- Nembrotha limaciformis Eliot, 1908: synonym of Martadoris limaciformis
- Nembrotha luteolineata Baba, 1936: synonym of Tyrannodoris luteolineata
- Nembrotha morosa Bergh, 1877: synonym of Tambja morosa
- Nembrotha nigerrima Bergh, 1877: synonym of Nembrotha kubaryana Bergh, 1877
- Nembrotha rubrocellata Bergh, 1905: synonym of Roboastra gracilis Bergh, 1877
- Nembrotha rubropapulosa Bergh, 1905: synonym of Roboastra rubropapulosa
- Nembrotha rutilans Pruvot-Fol, 1931: synonym of Nembrotha purpureolineata O'Donoghue, 1924
- Nembrotha sagamiana Baba, 1955: synonym of Tambja sagamiana
- Nembrotha tabescens (Risbec, 1928): synonym of Martadoris limaciformis Eliot, 1908
- Nembrotha verconis Basedow & Hedley, 1905: synonym of Tambja verconis
- Nembrotha yonowae Goethel & Debelius, 1992: synonym of Nembrotha cristata Bergh, 1877
