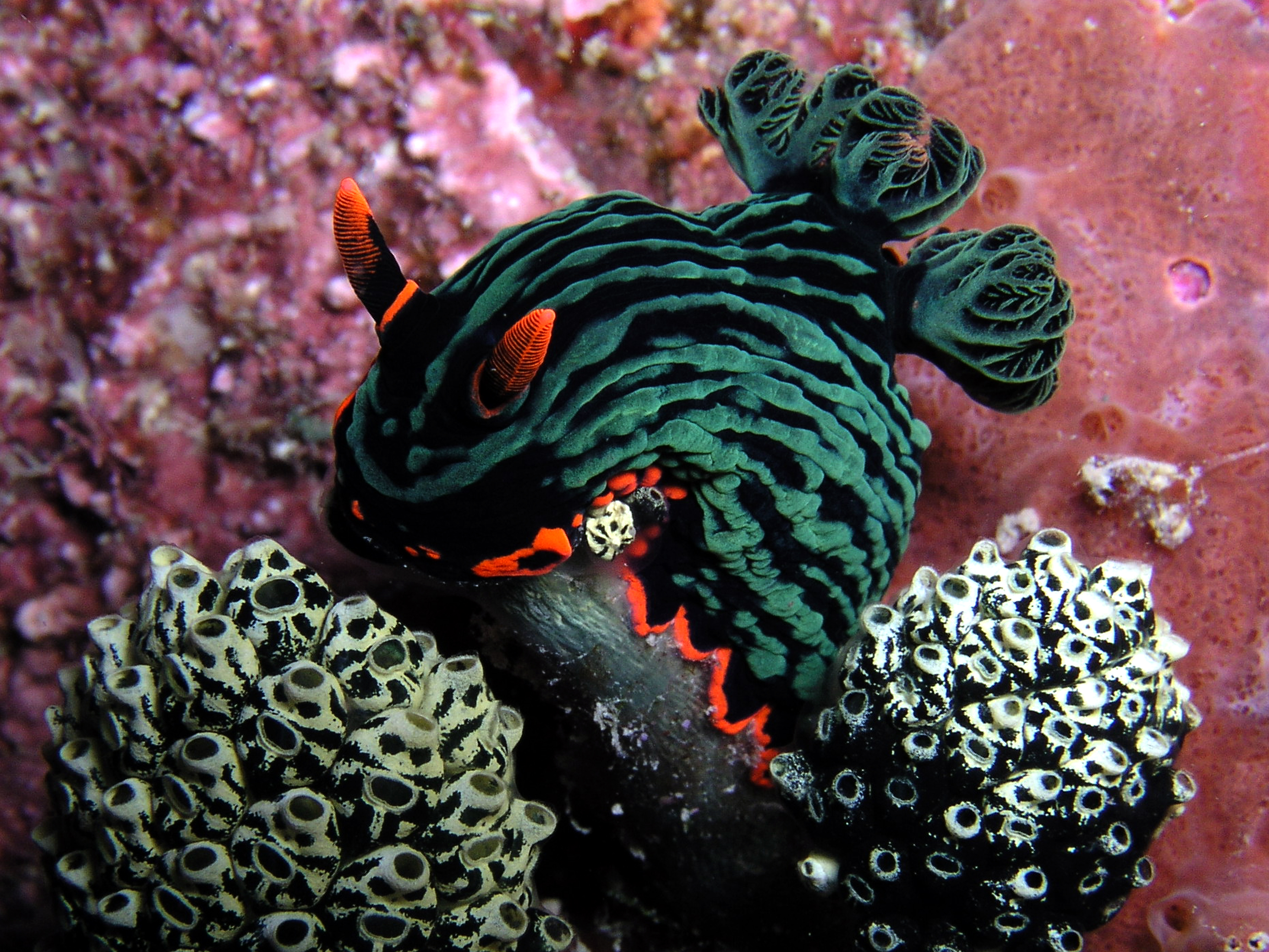
- Feeding on tunicates

Scientific classification
- Kingdom: Animalia
- Phylum: Mollusca
- Class: Gastropoda
- Order: Nudibranchia
- Family: Polyceridae
- Genus: Nembrotha
- Species: N. kubaryana

Binomial name
- Nembrotha kubaryana Bergh, 1877

Synonyms
- Nembrotha nigerrima Bergh, 1877

= Nembrotha kubaryana =

Species of gastropod

Nembrotha kubaryana, also known as the variable neon slug or the dusky nembrotha, is a species of colorful sea slug, a dorid nudibranch, a marine gastropod mollusk in the family Polyceridae.

== Synonymy ==
Its synonyms include Nembrotha nigerrima.

The two names Nembrotha nigerrima and N. kubaryana were published simultaneously by Rudolph Bergh in 1877, the first one on page 451, the second on page 454. Yonow & Hayward (1991) treated the two names as synonyms and, acting as first revisers, gave precedence to kubaryana over nigerrima. Pola et al. (2008) agreed with the synonymy, but initially rejected Yonow & Hayward's nomenclatural act, arguing that nigerrima had page precedence over kubaryana. However, the ICZN Code does not contain such a thing as "page precedence", and Yonow & Hayward's (1991) action was valid – and this position has been repeated by Yonow (2011). Pola et al. reversed their conclusion and accepted Yonow's act as first reviser in a following paper later the same year.

== Distribution ==
This species occurs in the tropical Western Indo-Pacific.

== Description ==
This animal can reach a total length of more than 120 mm. It is a large dark-bodied nudibranch which may have green stripes running down the length of the body or have green raised spots. The margin of the foot and head is a vivid red-orange. The rhinophores and gills may be red or green. Nembrotha kubaryana is easily confused with a similar species, Nembrotha cristata although the latter has no red-orange border on its foot.

== Ecology ==
The variable neon slug feeds on ascidians and has been observed feeding on the green-ringed ascidian, Sigillina signifera.

== Gallery ==
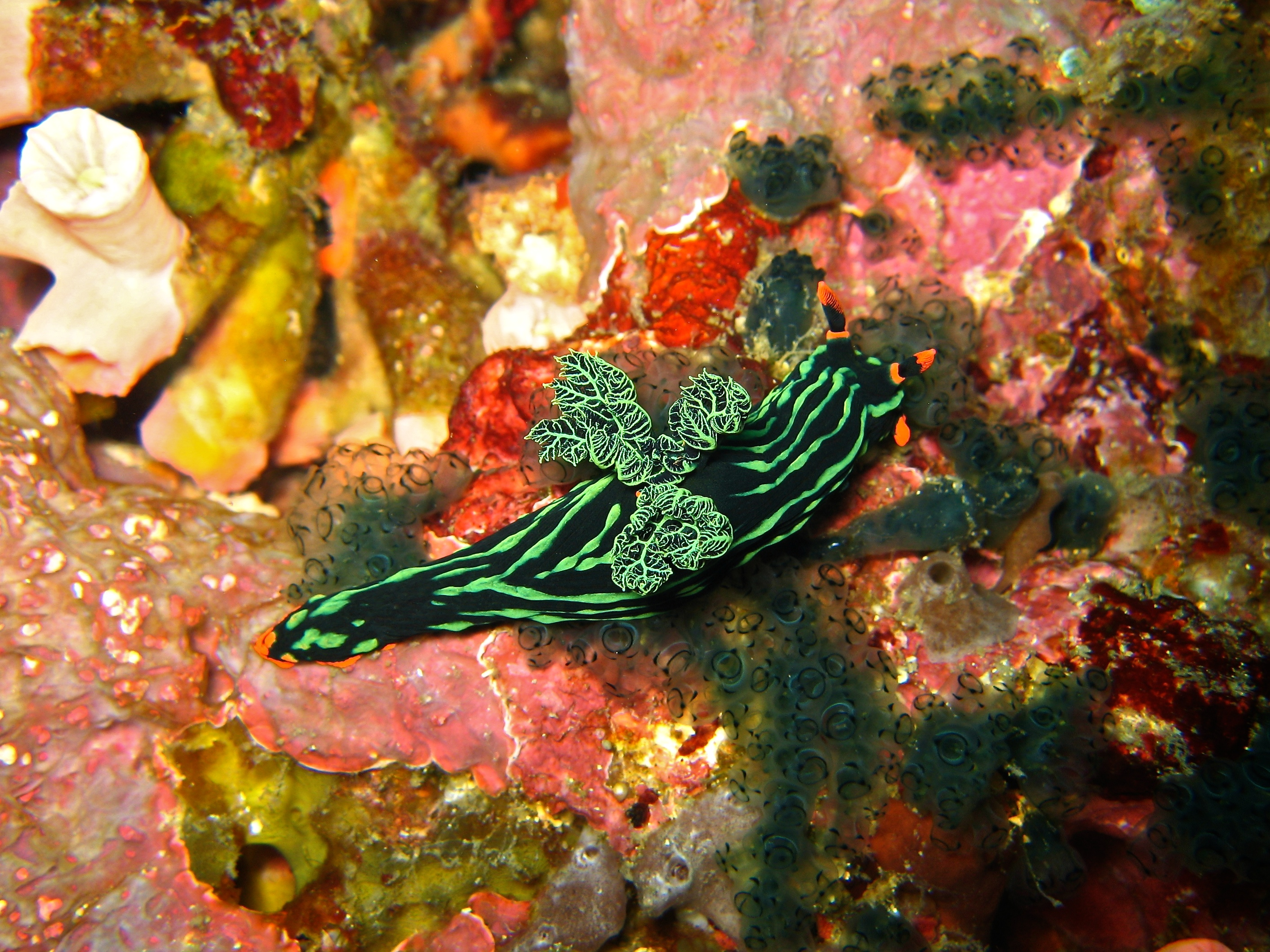
Nembrotha kubaryana at Verde Island, the Philippines.

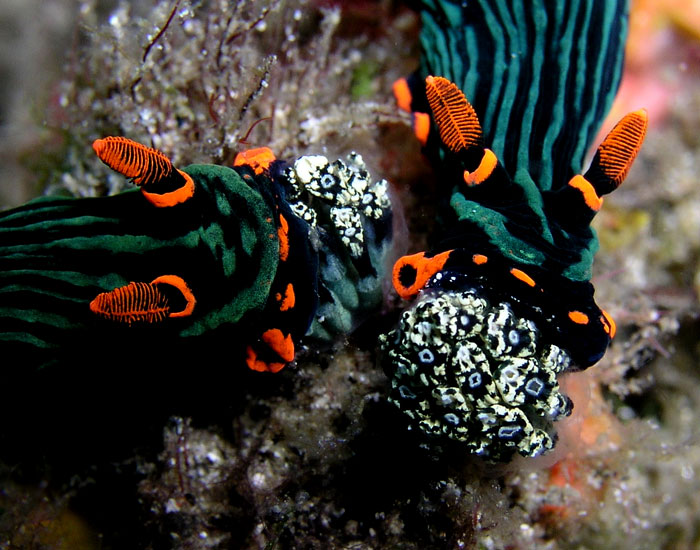
N. kubaryana eating Oxycorynia fascicularis tunicates

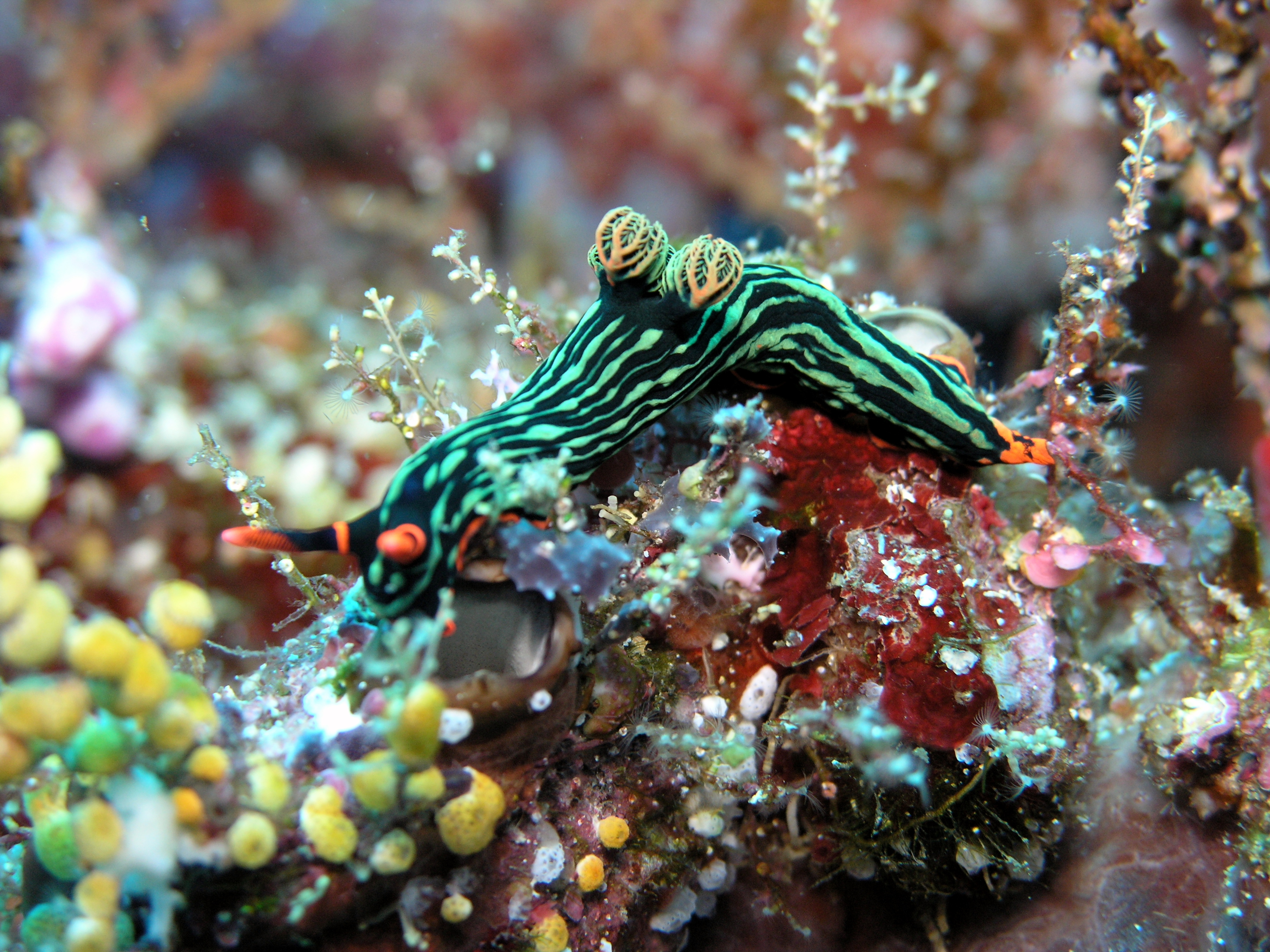
N. kubaryana near Manado

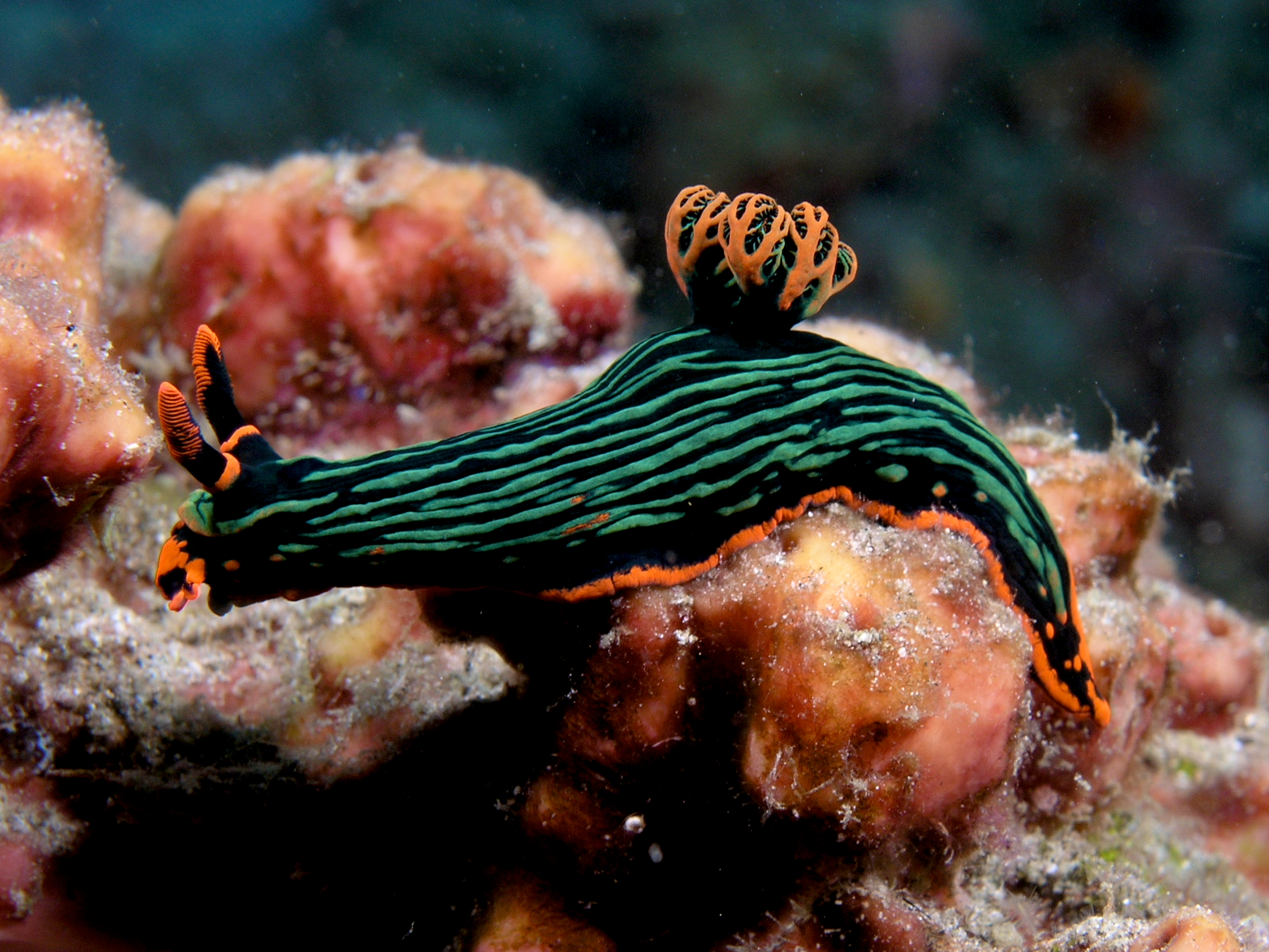
N. kubaryana in East Timor

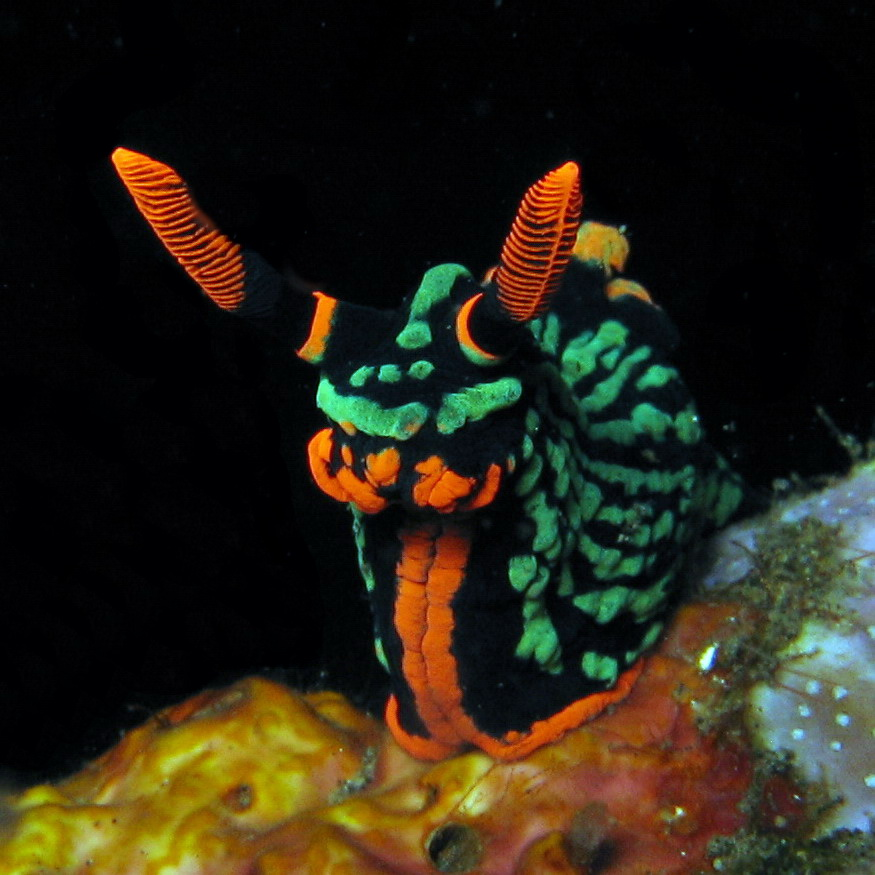
N. kubaryana from Bali

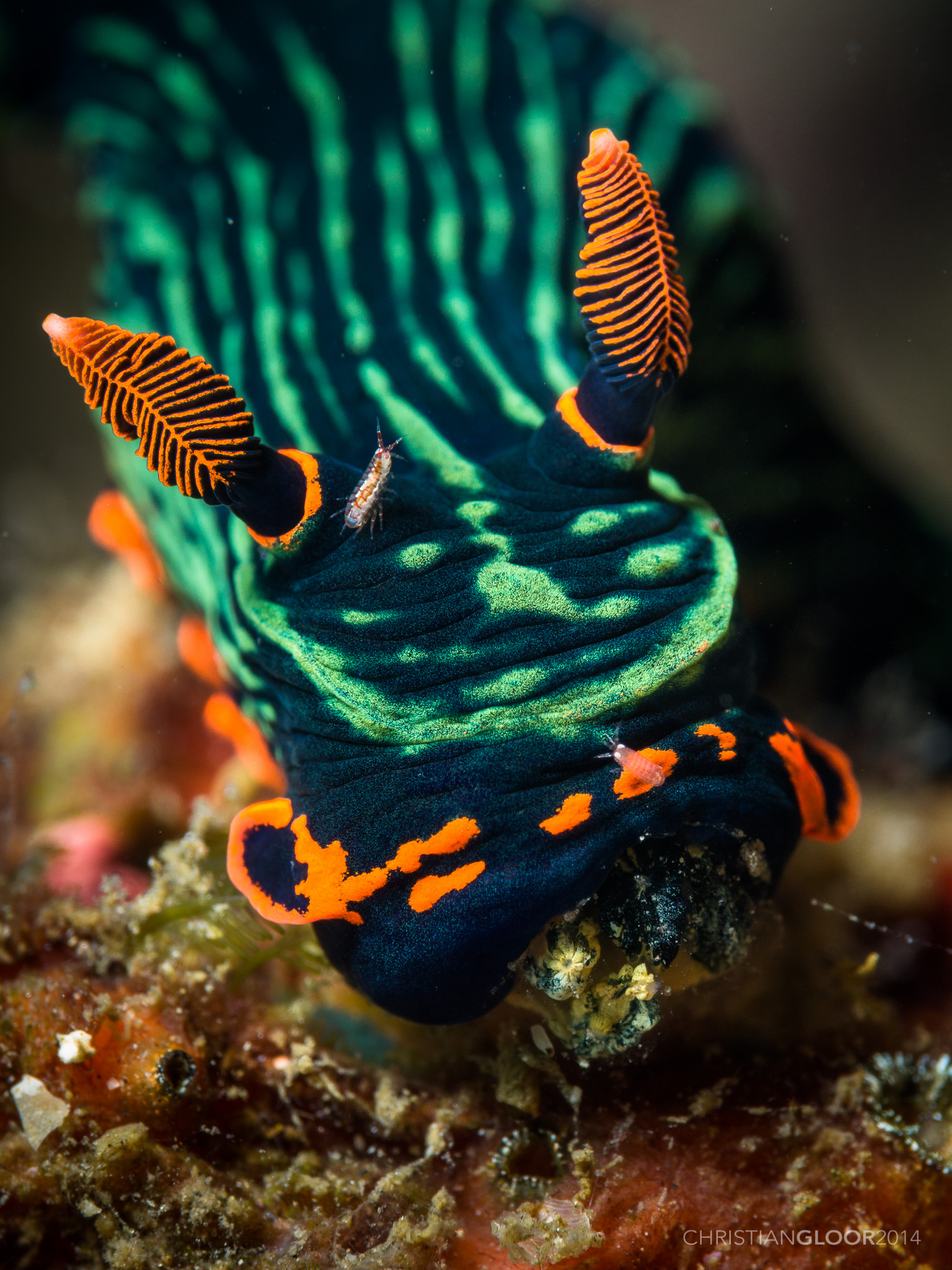
N. kubaryana at Wakatobi National Park

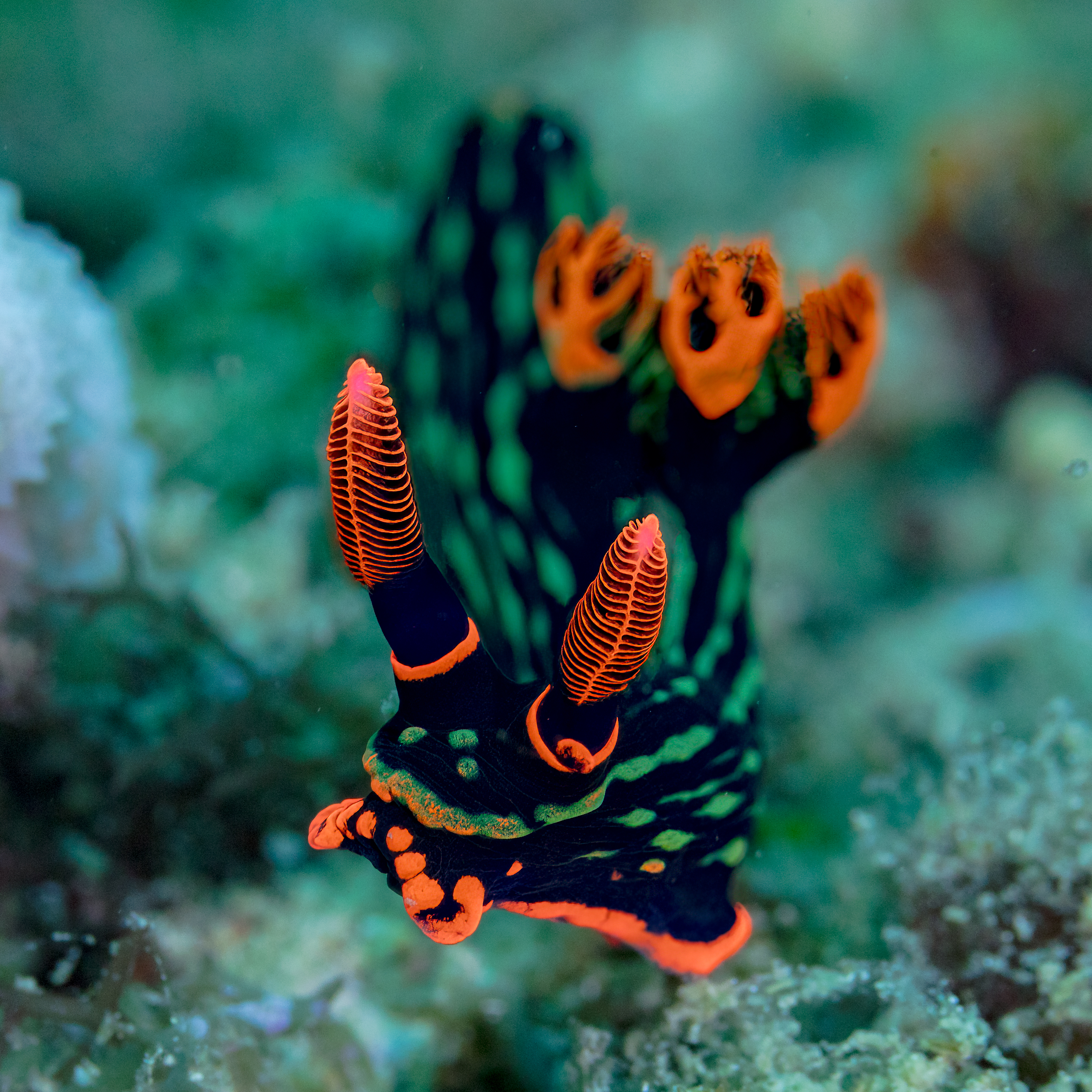
Head of N. kubaryana

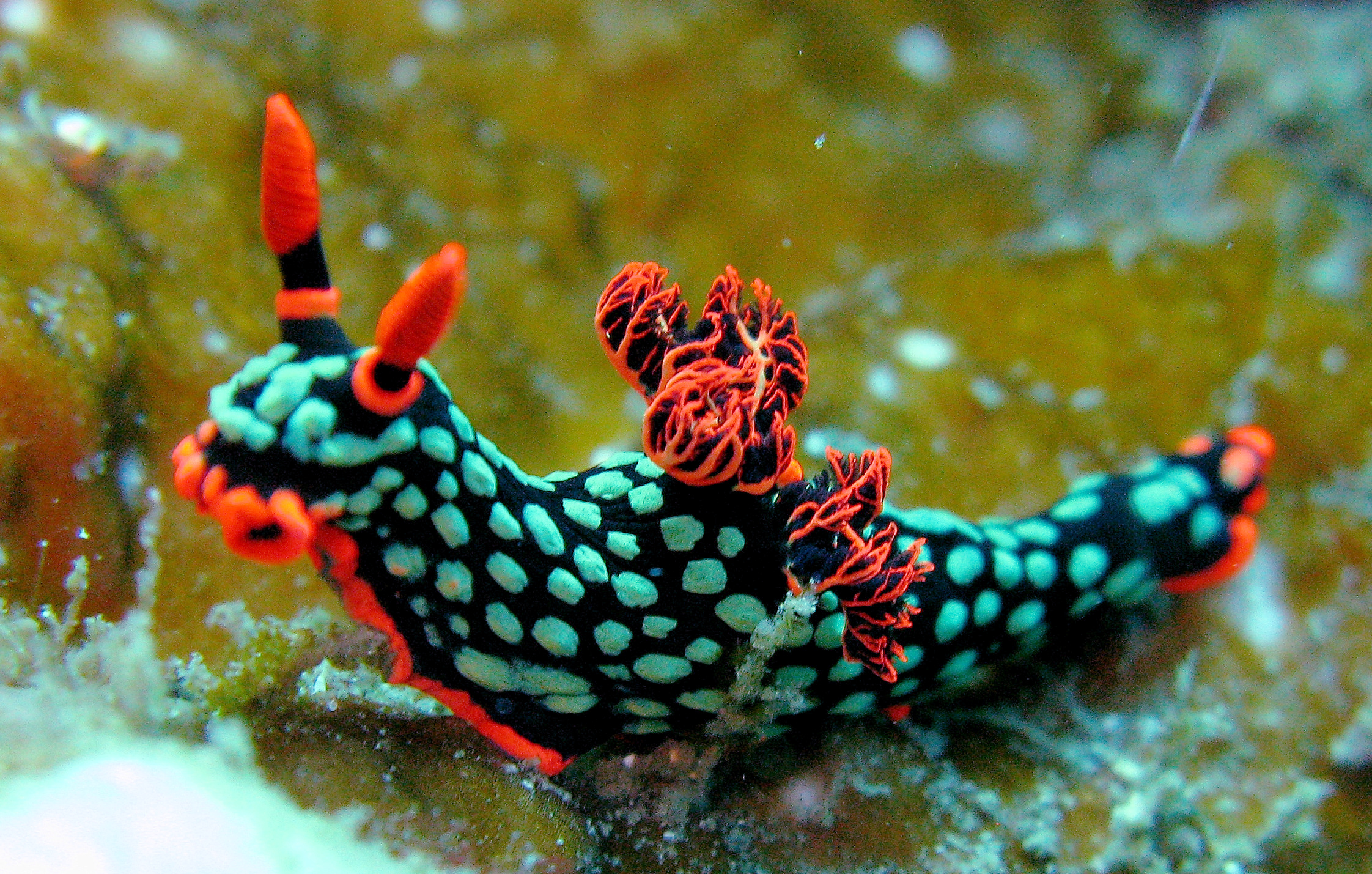
N. kubaryana with dot pattern at Lembeh, Indonesia

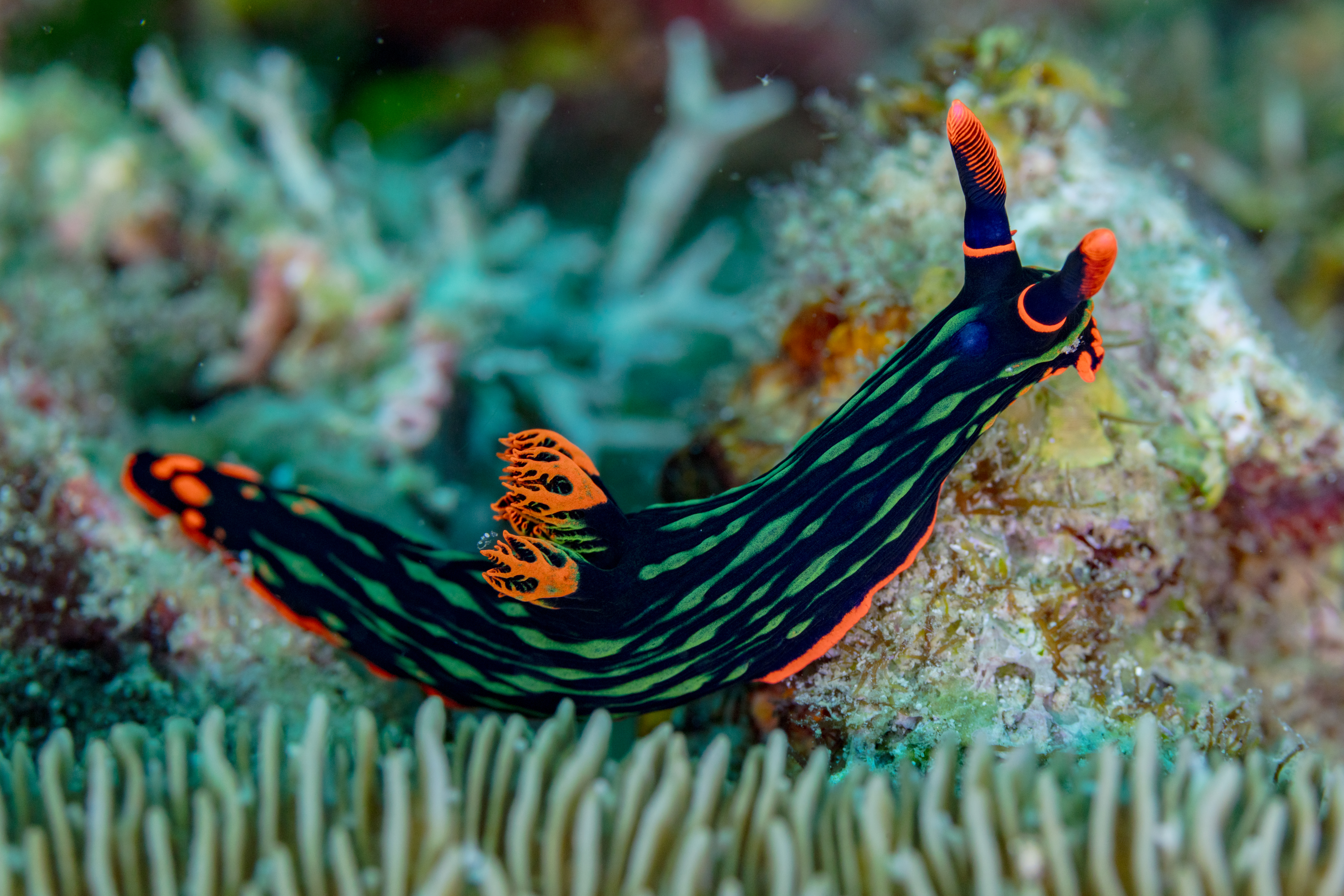
N. kubaryana in the Philippines

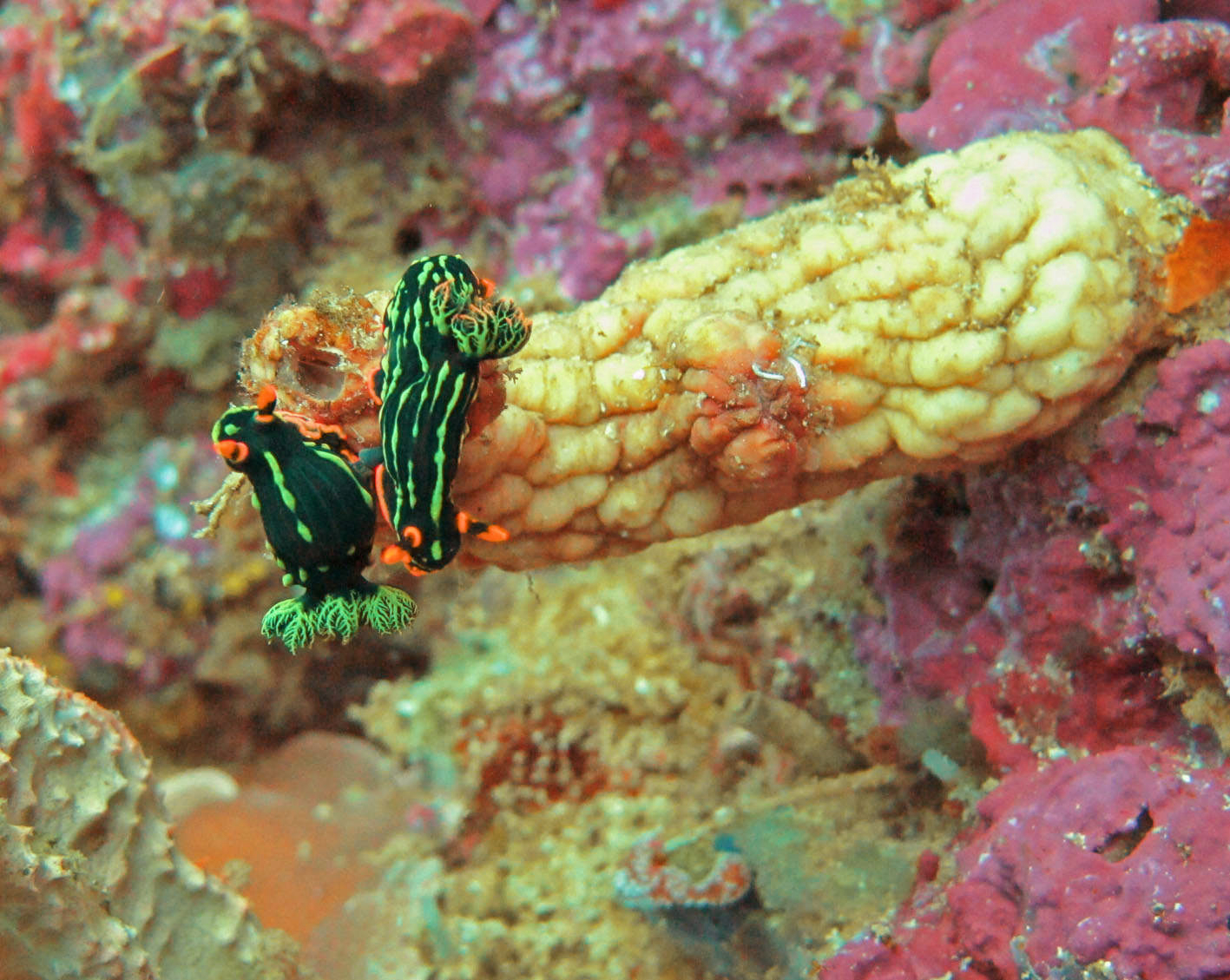
N. kubaryana at Raja Ampat Indonesia

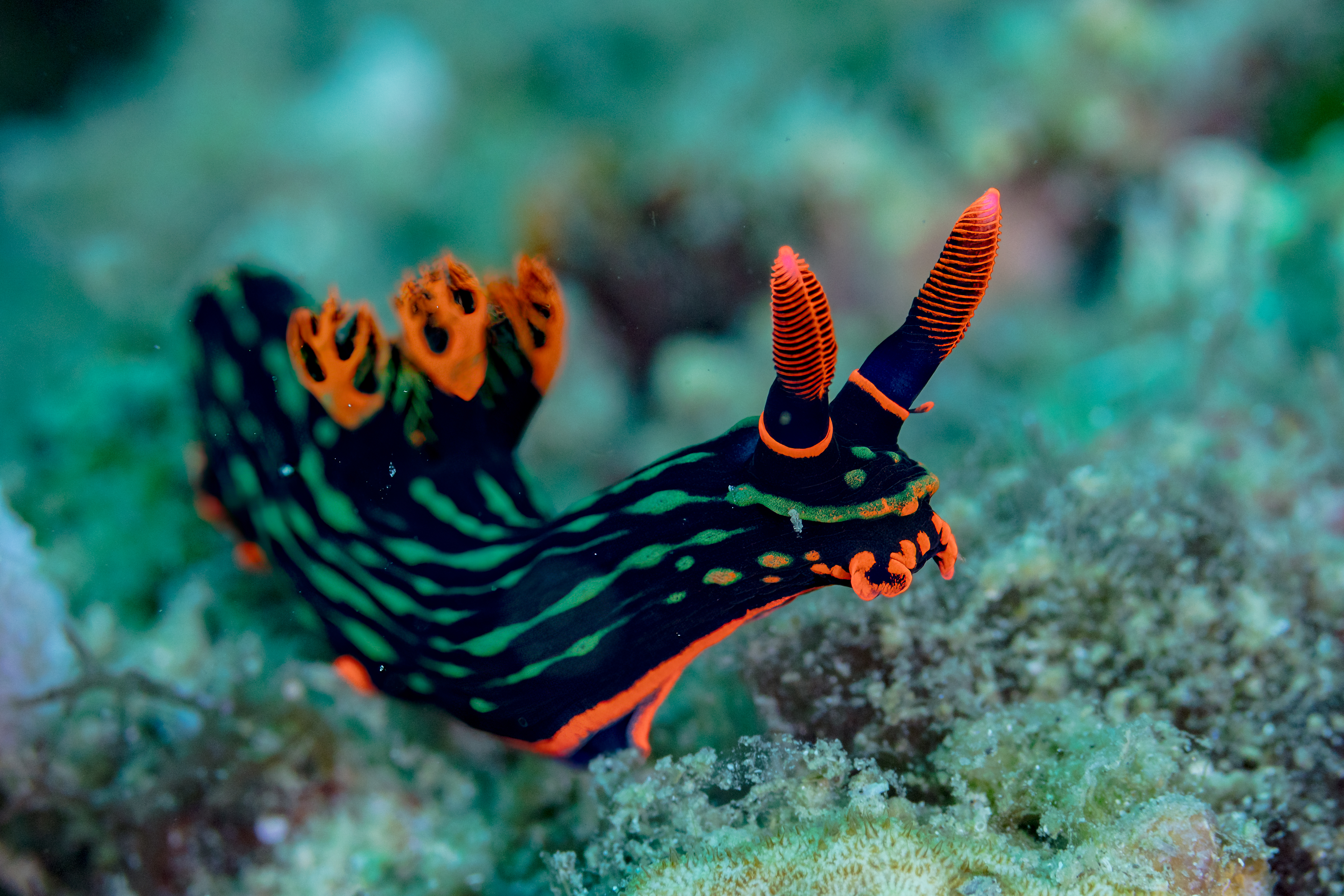
Nembrotha at Anilao Philippines

== Chemical defences ==
N. kubaryana uses the toxins in its prey ascidians to defend itself against predators. It stores the ascidian's toxins in its tissues and then releases them in a slimy defensive mucus when alarmed.
