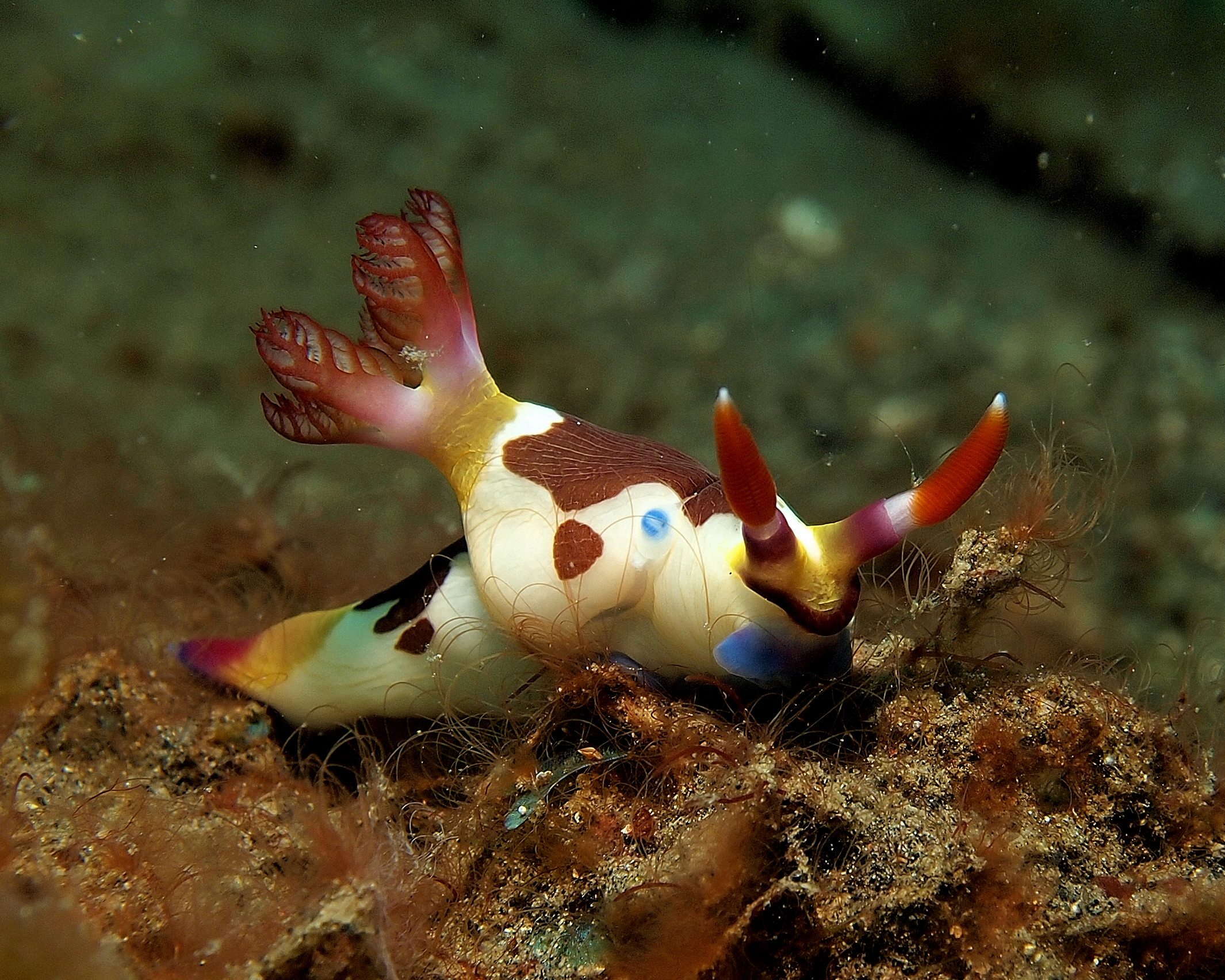
- Nembrotha purpureolineata

Scientific classification
- Kingdom: Animalia
- Phylum: Mollusca
- Class: Gastropoda
- Order: Nudibranchia
- Family: Polyceridae
- Genus: Nembrotha
- Species: N. purpureolineata

Binomial name
- Nembrotha purpureolineata O'Donoghue, 1924

Synonyms
- Kentiella rutilans Pruvot-Fol, 1931; Nembrotha rutilans (Pruvot-Fol, 1931)

= Nembrotha purpureolineata =

Species of gastropod

Nembrotha purpureolineata is a species of colourful sea slug, a dorid nudibranch, a marine gastropod mollusc in the family Polyceridae. Nembrotha rutilans, classified as a separate species until 2008, has now been reclassified as Nembrotha purpureolineata.

== Taxonomy ==
Nembrotha purpureolineata was first described from a preserved specimen collected from Abrolhos Islands off Western Australia by O'Donoghue in 1924. The short colour description given is probably enough to identify it to be the same as Nembrotha rutilans (Pruvot-Fol, 1931). The description of this species was done purely from a painting of marine life on the Great Barrier Reef in a book by William Saville-Kent, (1893) and so the earlier name has been given precedence.

== Distribution ==
This nudibranch occurs in the west of the tropical Indo-West Pacific Ocean.

== Description ==
Nembrotha purpureolineata is a large pale-bodied dorid that may reach a total length of 120 mm. Individual specimens vary extremely in terms of colour and patterning, which can make it very difficult to differentiate from other Nembrothids. Thankfully, progress continues to be made in fine-scale differentiation within the genus, bringing great clarity to colour morphotypes that have been regarded as cryptic in the past.

The base colour of the body is always a creamy white, a blue to purple line always edges the foot and oral tentacles and there are always brown markings. The brown markings may present as longitudinal lines of variable thickness. A thinner line begins anterior to and passing beneath the rhinophores, running along the edge of the notum and meeting posterior to the gills to form a single broad line that runs down the tail. Thicker line or lines occur between these, and will form broad patches on the notum anterior and posterior to the gills. Some of these lines will terminate at the gill circle instead of parting around it. One or more lines occur on the sides of the body to meet at the tail as well. The lamellate rhinophores are described as "red or vermillion with blue or purple tips". The rhinophore stalks are pink, and the sheaths blue to purple with some yellow below, either concentrated or diffuse. The gill leaves are red to vermillion, the gill stalks are purple, and the there is diffuse yellow at the base.

The second colour morphotype, finally backed by genetic data, has no brown lines at all, and instead has two large brown patches on its notum, one that sits anterior to the gills, and the other posterior. Pigmentation of the patches can vary in intensity, ranging from a dark brown that is nearly black, to a paleness that looks nearly brownish-orange. Rhinophore clubs range from bright red to a brownish-orange and are tipped with white. The rhinophore stalks are white, and the upper edge of the rhinophore sheaths may range from pink to purple. The base of the rhinophoral sheath will have yellow-greenish markings that may extend to meet the other base. This yellow-greenish colour will also be found as a well-defined band surrounding the base of the gill stalks, and also as a small patch at the tip of the tail. Another smaller patch may or may not be at tip of the tail that corresponds to the colour of the upper edge of the rhinophoral sheaths, the colour of the gills, or both. The pigmentation of the gills can range anywhere from brownish red to a pinkish maroon, the deepest pigmentation occurring at the gill fronds and fading into white as it travels down the gill stalks.

This is the form that is constantly confused with Nembrotha chamberlaini. The most reliable method of differentiation is to observe the gills and surrounding area; in N. chamberlaini, the gills and gill stalks are always uniformly pigmented with no variation, and end in patch of the same colour on the back. However, in this colour morphotype of N. purpureolineata, the pigmentation of the gills fades into white as it travels down the stalks, and below that will be a well-defined band of yellow- or greenish-brown where the stalks join the body.

It is very important to note that there will be no bright orange colouration on the notum ever. Previously, select specimens were attributed to N. purpureolineata or Nembrotha aurea depending on the locations of bright orange patches. However, new data has identified these specimens as their own unique species, Nembrotha lorosae.

N. purpureolineata, traditional morphotype

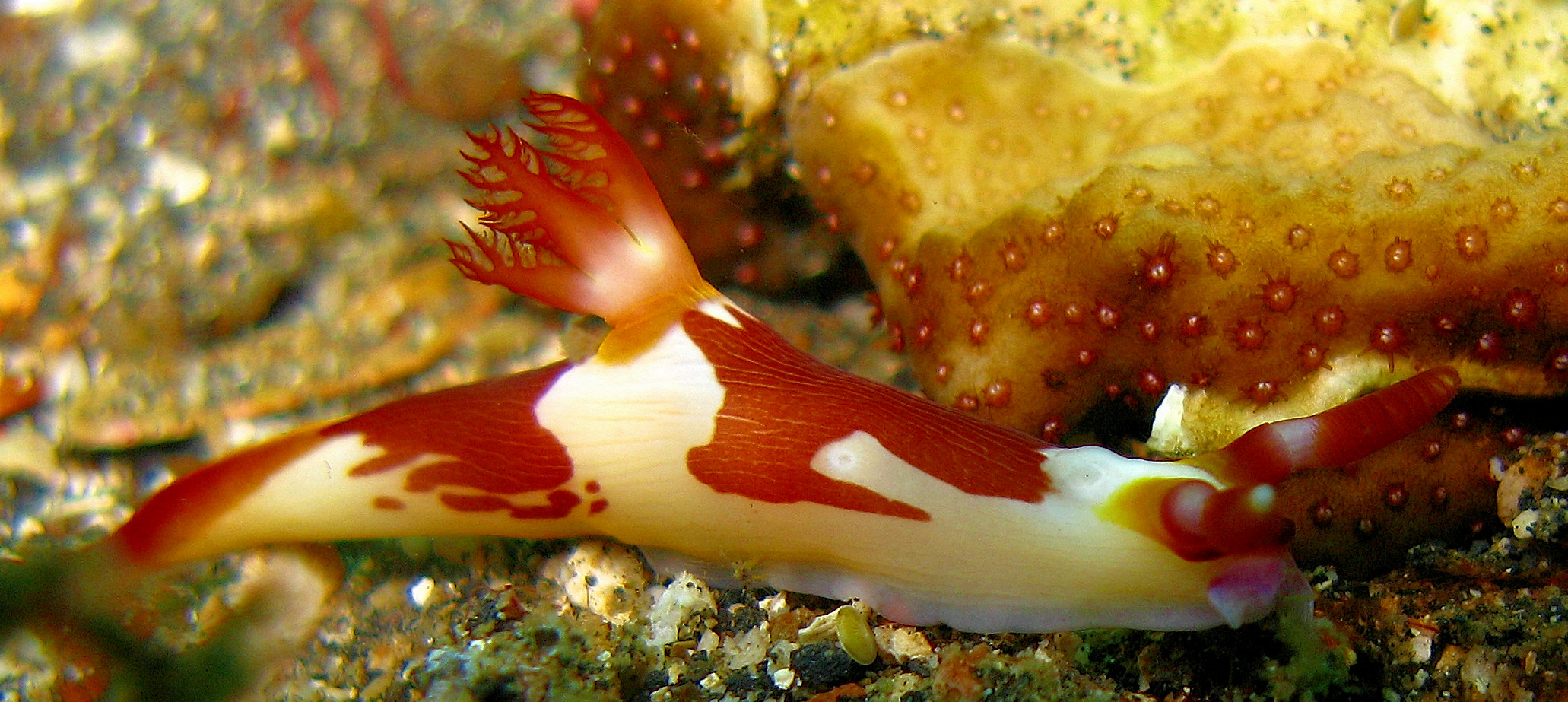
N. purpureolineata, newly confirmed morphotype

N. purpureolineata mating

== Ecology ==
This species feeds on ascidians and tunicates. It has been seen feeding on the yellow-lined ascidian, Clavelina meridionalis.
