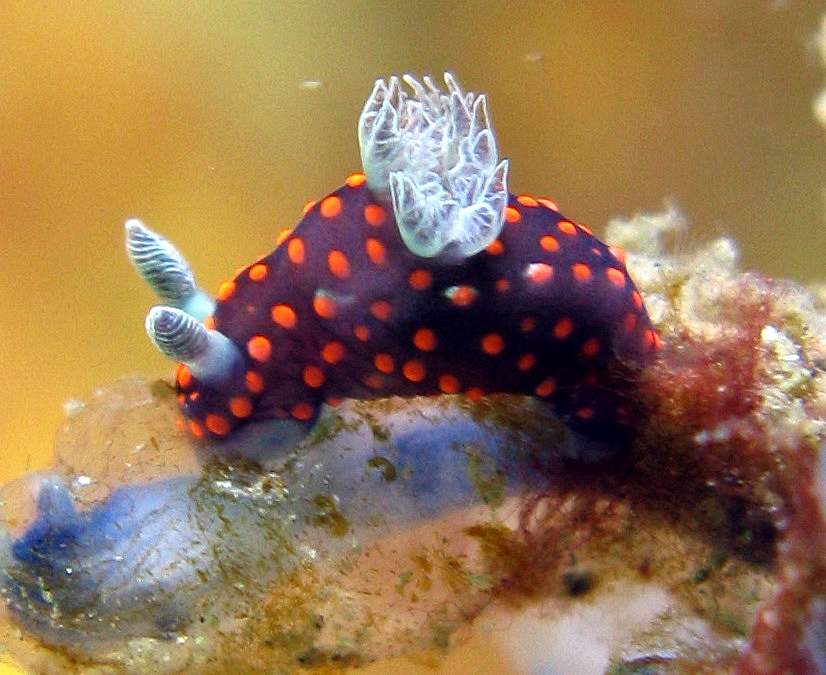

Scientific classification
- Domain: Eukaryota
- Kingdom: Animalia
- Phylum: Mollusca
- Class: Gastropoda
- Order: Nudibranchia
- Superfamily: Polyceroidea
- Family: Polyceridae
- Genus: Nembrotha
- Species: N. yonowae

Binomial name
- Nembrotha yonowae Goethel & Debelius, 1992

Synonyms
- Nembrotha guttata Yonow, 1994

= Nembrotha yonowae =

Species of gastropod

Nembrotha yonowae is a species of colourful sea slug, a dorid nudibranch, a marine gastropod mollusk in the family Polyceridae. It was first described in 1992.

== Distribution ==
This species is known from the western Indo-Pacific Ocean, including the Maldives, the Philippines and Indonesia.

== Description ==
Nembrotha yonowae is a large black nembrothid that grows to at least 95 mm in length. Its body is covered with orange pustules. The rhinophores and gills are black, edged in orange. This species looks similar in appearance to Nembrotha cristata.

== Ecology ==
Nembrotha yonowae eats colonial ascidians.
