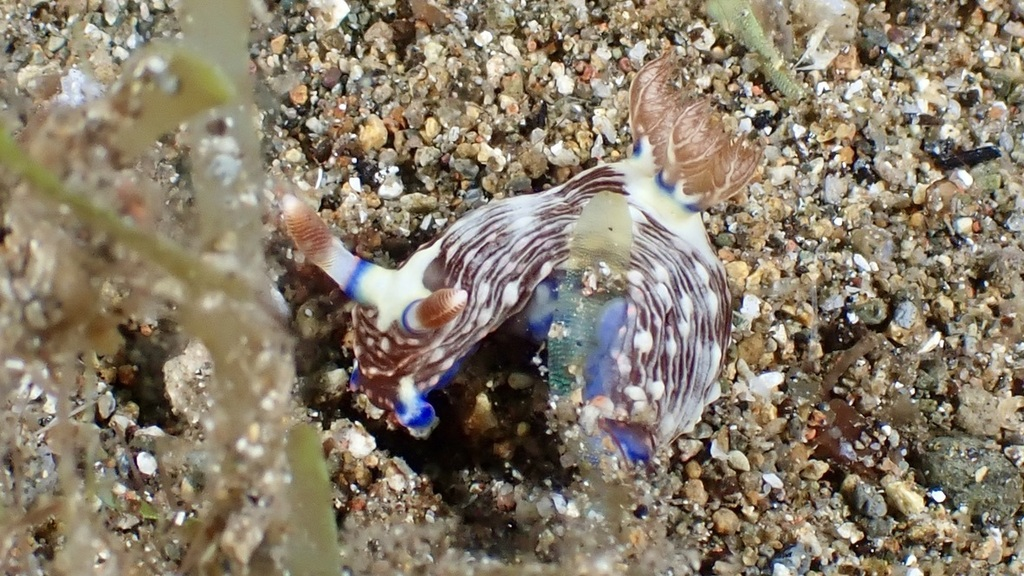

Scientific classification
- Kingdom: Animalia
- Phylum: Mollusca
- Class: Gastropoda
- Order: Nudibranchia
- Family: Polyceridae
- Genus: Nembrotha
- Species: N. livingstonei

Binomial name
- Nembrotha livingstonei Allan, 1933

= Nembrotha livingstonei =

Species of gastropod

Nembrotha livingstonei is a species of colourful sea slug, a dorid nudibranch, a marine gastropod mollusk in the family Polyceridae. It was first described in 1933.

== Distribution ==
This species is known from the tropical Indo-Pacific Ocean.

== Description ==
Nembrotha livingstonei is a red-brown nembrothid that grows to at least 48 mm in length. The body is marked with white, orange and brown spots. The rhinophores are reddy-brown. The gill stalks and branches are white or yellow, while the gill pinnae are deep red.

== Ecology ==
Nembrotha livingstonei eats colonial ascidians.
