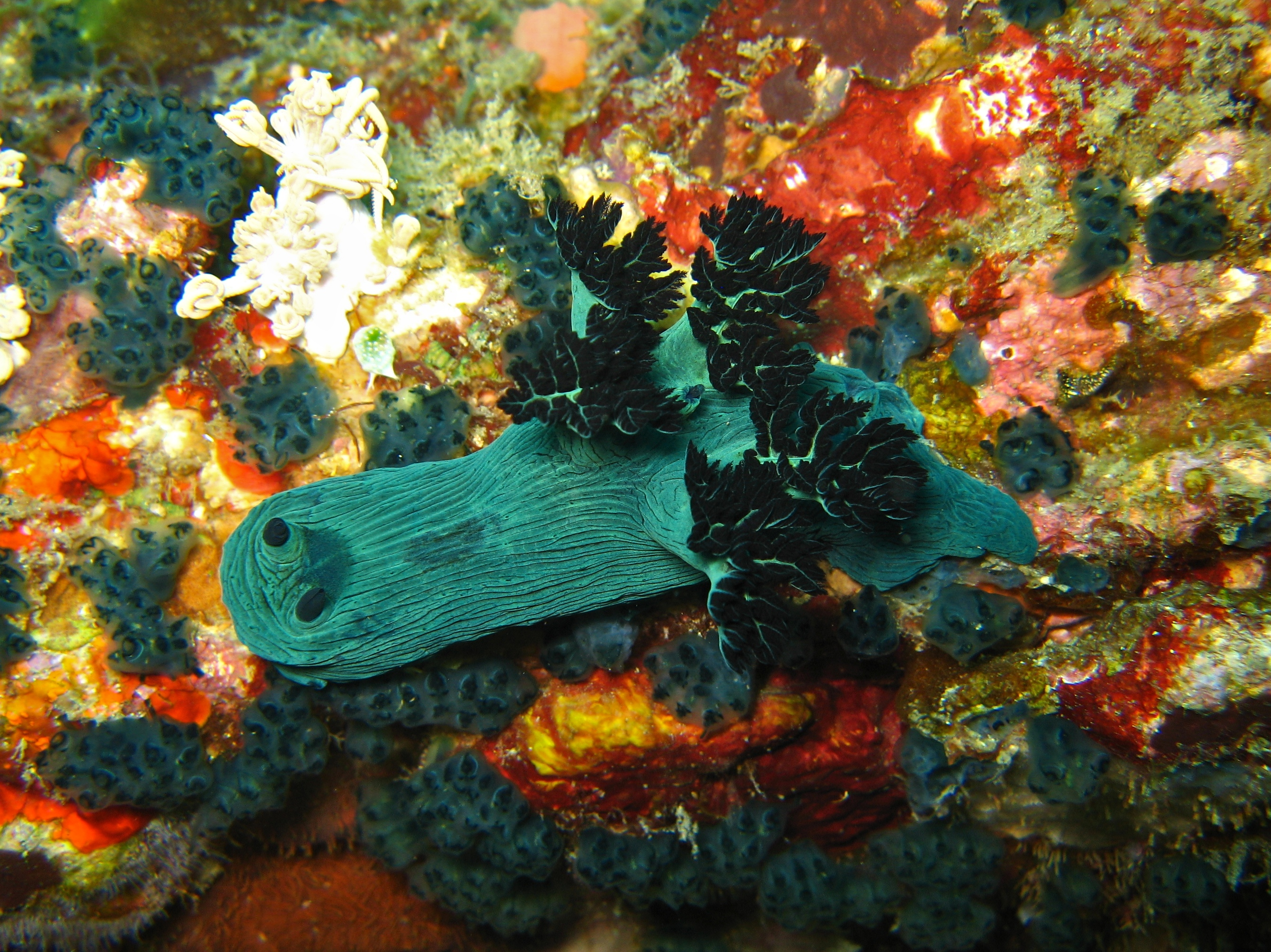
- Nembrotha milleri in the Philippines

Scientific classification
- Kingdom: Animalia
- Phylum: Mollusca
- Class: Gastropoda
- Order: Nudibranchia
- Family: Polyceridae
- Genus: Nembrotha
- Species: N. milleri

Binomial name
- Nembrotha milleri Gosliner & Behrens, 1997

= Nembrotha milleri =

Species of gastropod

Nembrotha milleri is a species of sea slug, a dorid nudibranch, a marine gastropod mollusk in the family Polyceridae. This species was named after the nudibranch enthusiast Michael D. Miller.

== Distribution ==
This species occurs in the tropical Indo-Pacific Ocean. There is another nudibranch species known only as Nembrotha sp. 14 in East Africa which may be a form of Nembrotha milleri.

== Description ==
This animal can reach a total length of at least 60 mm. It has a grey-green to dark green body with blackish longitudinal wrinkles running down the length of the body. A different color form with pale yellowish green background has been observed around Taiwan. The rhinophores and gills are typically black.

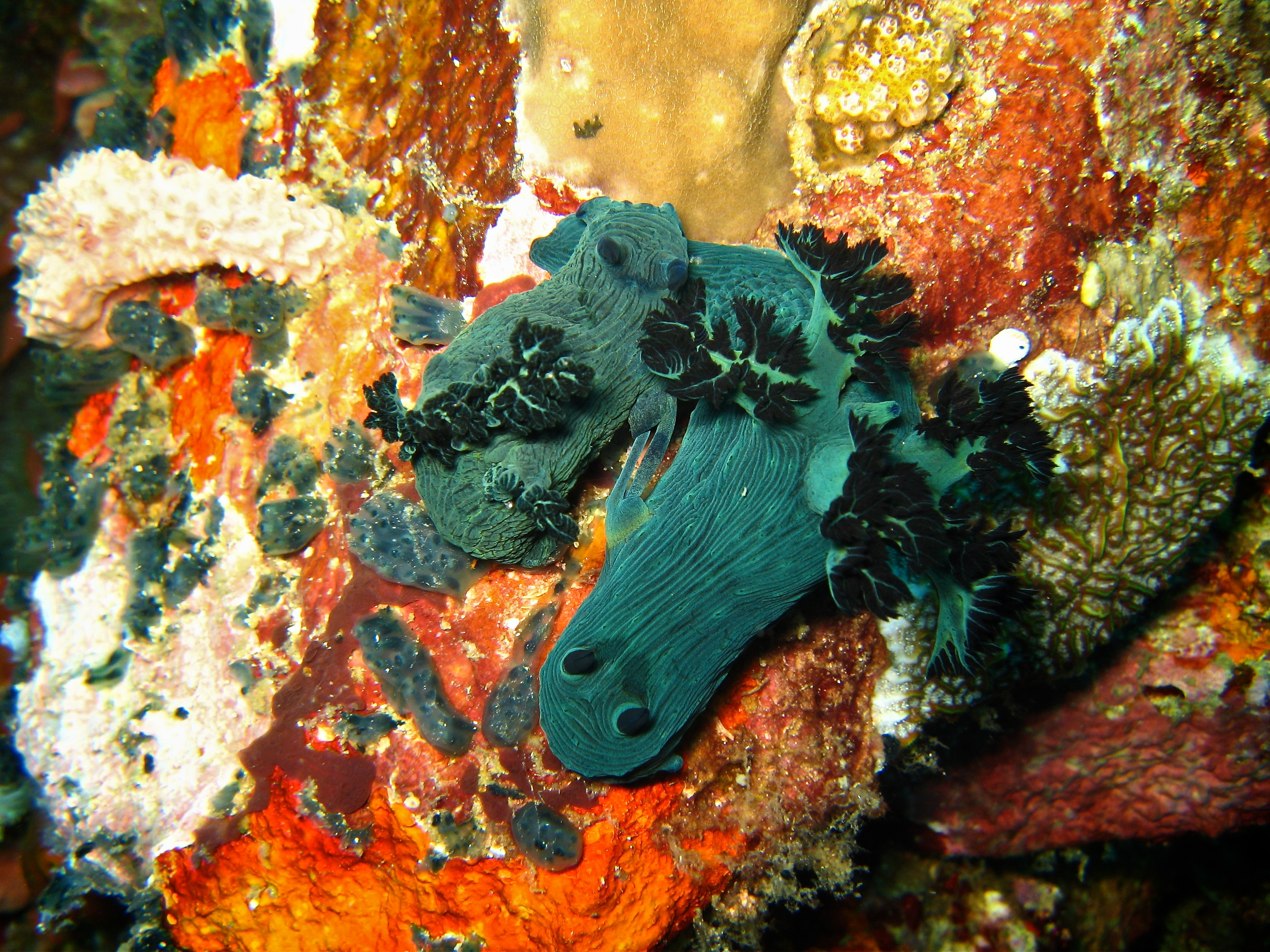
A pair of mating Nembrotha milleri

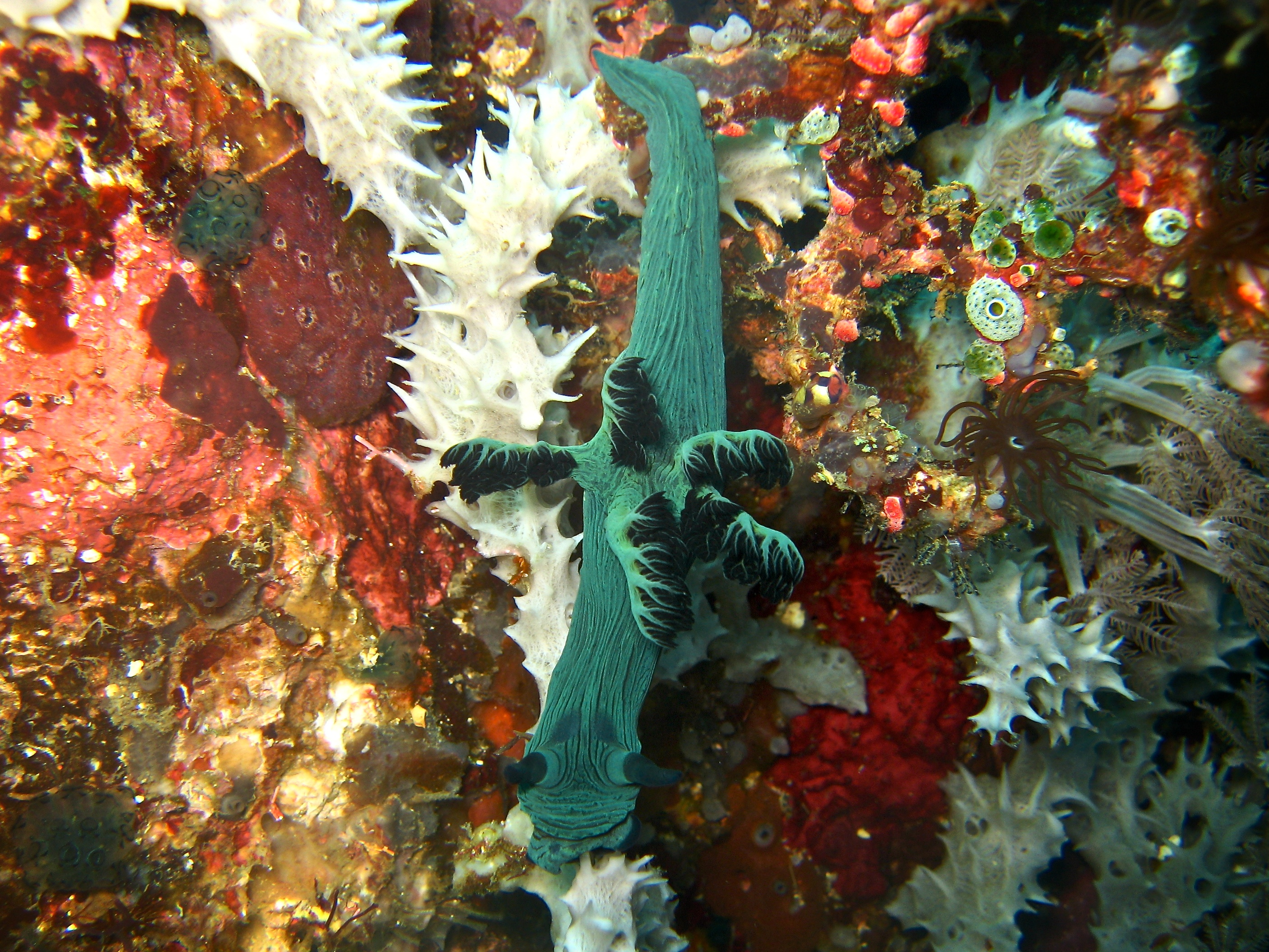
Nembrotha milleri at Verde Island, the Philippines

== Ecology ==
Nembrotha milleri feeds on ascidians and tunicates. It has been seen feeding on the green-ringed ascidian, Sigillina signifera.
