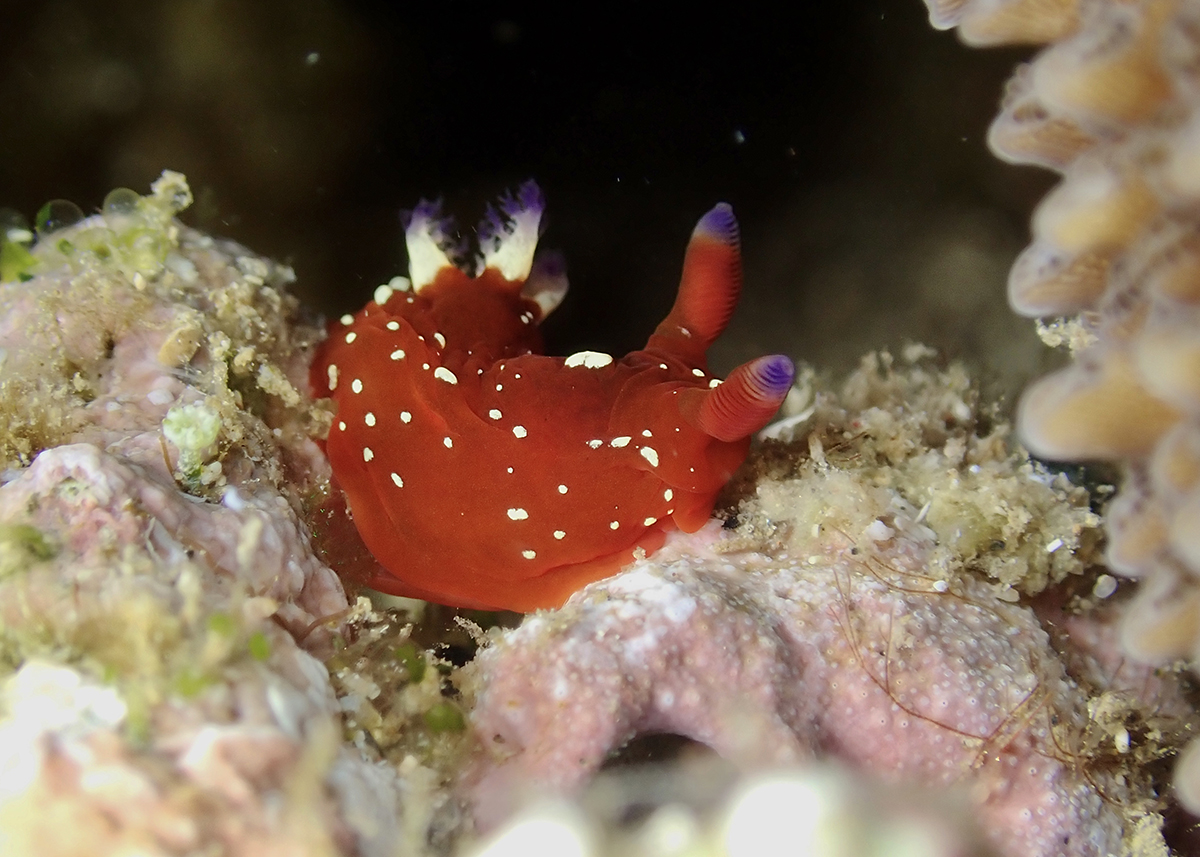

Scientific classification
- Kingdom: Animalia
- Phylum: Mollusca
- Class: Gastropoda
- Order: Nudibranchia
- Family: Polyceridae
- Genus: Martadoris
- Species: M. limaciformis

Binomial name
- Martadoris limaciformis (Eliot, 1908)

Synonyms
- Nembrotha limaciformis Eliot, 1908; Tambja limaciformis Eliot, 1908

= Martadoris limaciformis =

Species of gastropod

Martadoris limaciformis is a species of sea slug, a dorid nudibranch, a marine gastropod mollusc in the family Polyceridae.

== Distribution ==
This species was described from 2 m depth at Shab ul Shubuk, Sudan, Red Sea, 18°50′N 37°33′E. It has been reported from the Indian Ocean and Indonesia.
