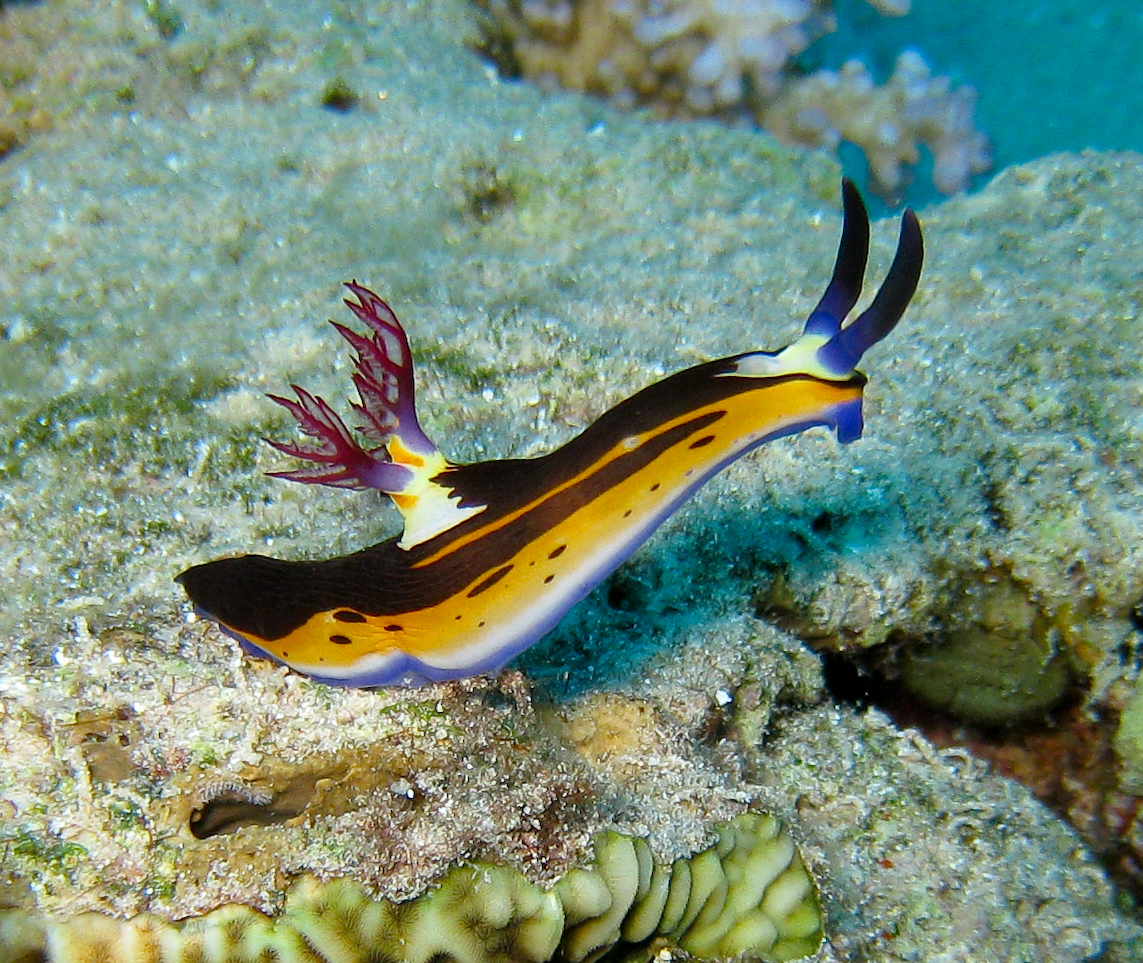
- Nembrotha megalocera in the Red Sea

Scientific classification
- Kingdom: Animalia
- Phylum: Mollusca
- Class: Gastropoda
- Order: Nudibranchia
- Family: Polyceridae
- Genus: Nembrotha
- Species: N. megalocera

Binomial name
- Nembrotha megalocera Yonow, 1990
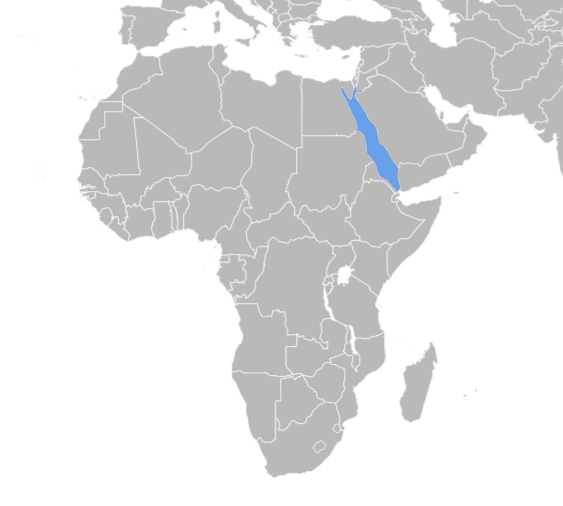

= Nembrotha megalocera =

Species of gastropod

Nembrotha megalocera is a species of colourful sea slug, a dorid nudibranch, a marine gastropod mollusk in the family Polyceridae. It was first described in 1990.

== Distribution ==
This species is known from the Red Sea.

== Description ==
Nembrotha megalocera is a large, strikingly coloured nembrothid that grows to at least 45 mm in length. The base colouration is a creamy yellow, atop which large black patches streak down the notum, leaving a patch of creamy yellow untouched at the head and near the gills. Stripes and flecks of black often run down the sides as well, from under which a bright neon orange diffuses gradually back into creamy yellow. The oral tentacles and margin of the foot are lined with a intense purple or blue. The rhinophore clubs and stalks are the same black as the dorsal patches, and the rhinophore sheaths are a purple or blue that matches the margin of the foot. The gills are usually a deep red that blends into purple gill stalks, but the intensity of the pigmentation varies between individuals. There may be flecks of neon orange in the yellow patch near the base of the gills. Behind the rhinophores, are two translucent spots that house their simple light-sensing eyes.

== Ecology ==
Nembrotha megalocera eats colonial ascidians.
