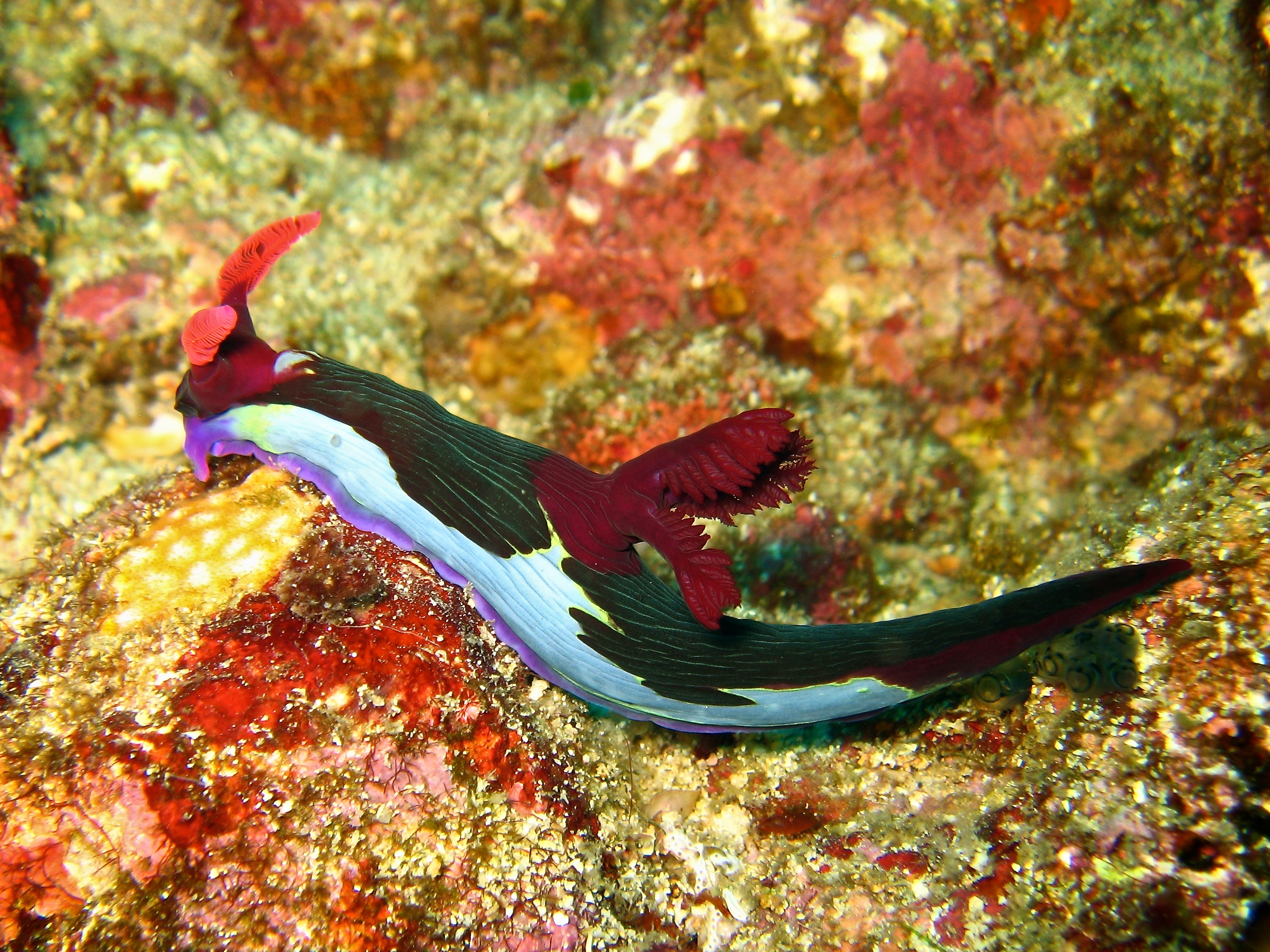
- Nembrotha chamberlaini at Verde Island, the Philippines.

Scientific classification
- Kingdom: Animalia
- Phylum: Mollusca
- Class: Gastropoda
- Order: Nudibranchia
- Family: Polyceridae
- Genus: Nembrotha
- Species: N. chamberlaini

Binomial name
- Nembrotha chamberlaini Gosliner & Behrens, 1997

= Nembrotha chamberlaini =

Species of mollusc

Nembrotha chamberlaini is a species of colorful sea slug, a dorid nudibranch, a marine gastropod mollusk in the family Polyceridae. It was first described in 1997.

== Distribution ==
This species is known only from the Philippines and Indonesia.

== Description ==
Nembrotha chamberlaini is white with streaks of black or dark red that may cover the entire upper mantle, leaving only two translucent spots posterior to the rhinophores that house their simple light-sensing eyes. Their distinctive gills are a deep maroon or bright crimson and sits on a spot of the same colour without break or variation in pigmentation, a detail which is key in differentiating the species from variants of Nembrotha purpureolineata that may otherwise look identical to N. chamberlaini. The rhinophore sheaths and surrounding area are a maroon or bright crimson that matches the gill colouration, and the rhinophore stalks and clubs bright crimson. At the posterior end there will be a maroon or bright crimson patch that matches the gills, and may or may not be partially covered by the black or dark red dorsal patches. The oral tentacles and margin of the foot are a blue or purple. Sometimes there is an inconsistent ghostly outline of neon yellow along pigmented patches.

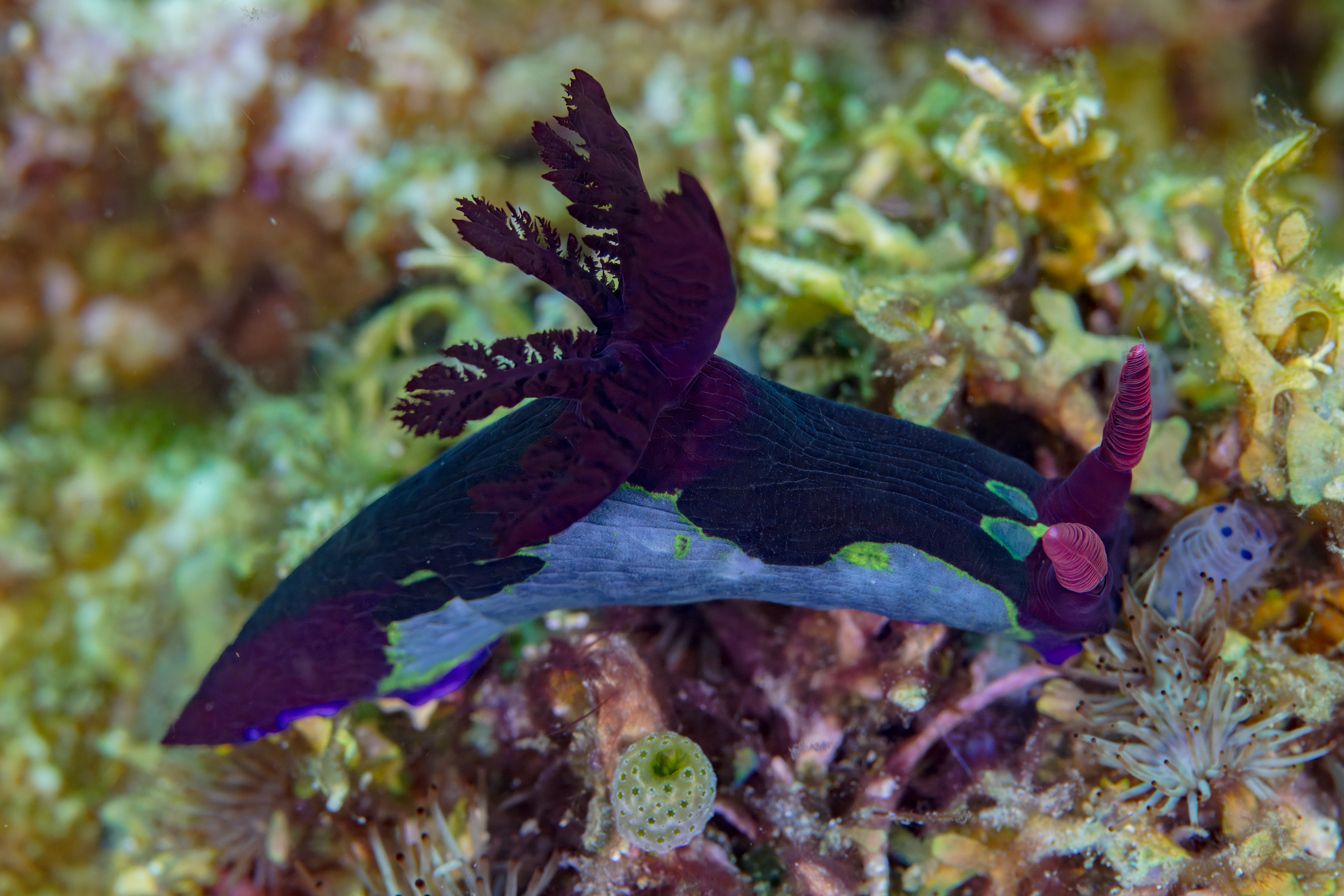
A particularly pigmented showcases a clearer view of yellow markings.

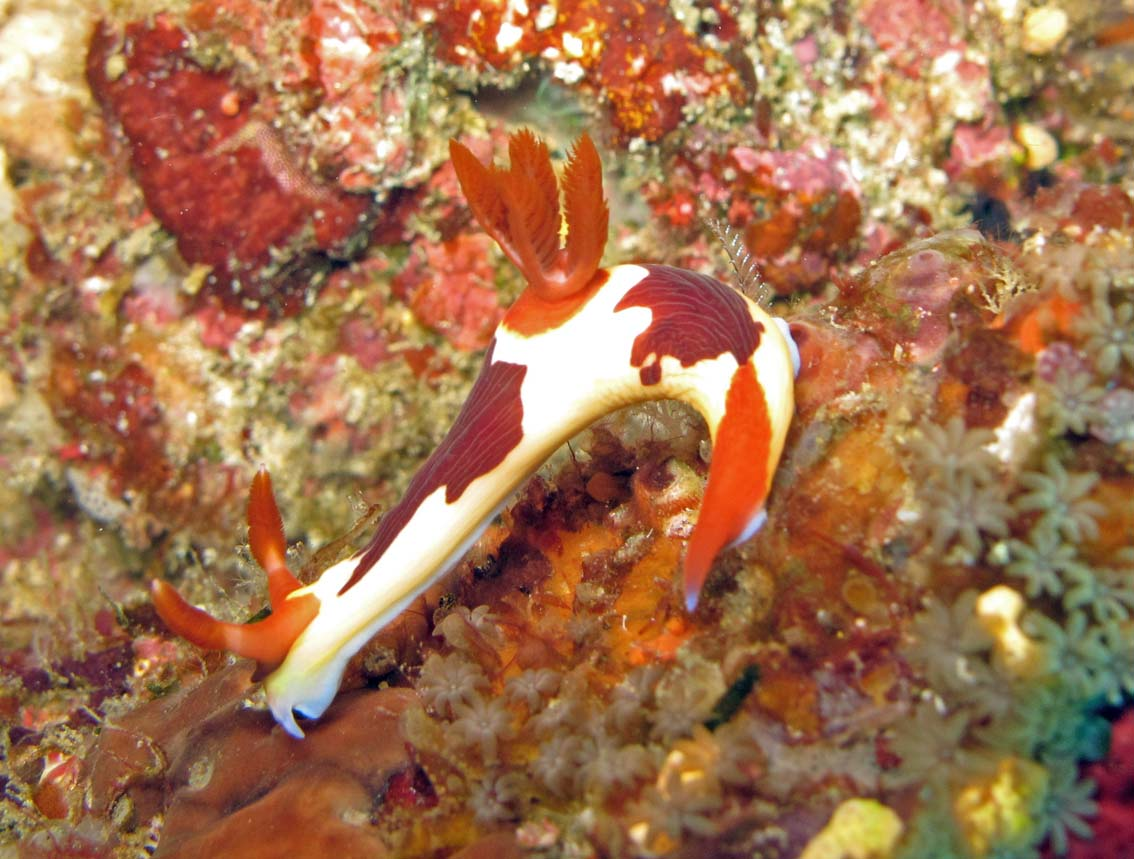
A paler specimen with dark reds and crimsons as opposed to the typical blacks and maroons.

== Ecology ==
This species feeds on ascidians and tunicates. It has been seen feeding on the bright-blue ascidian, Rhopalaea sp, as well as other ascidians Clavelina sp., & Oxycorynia sp. .
