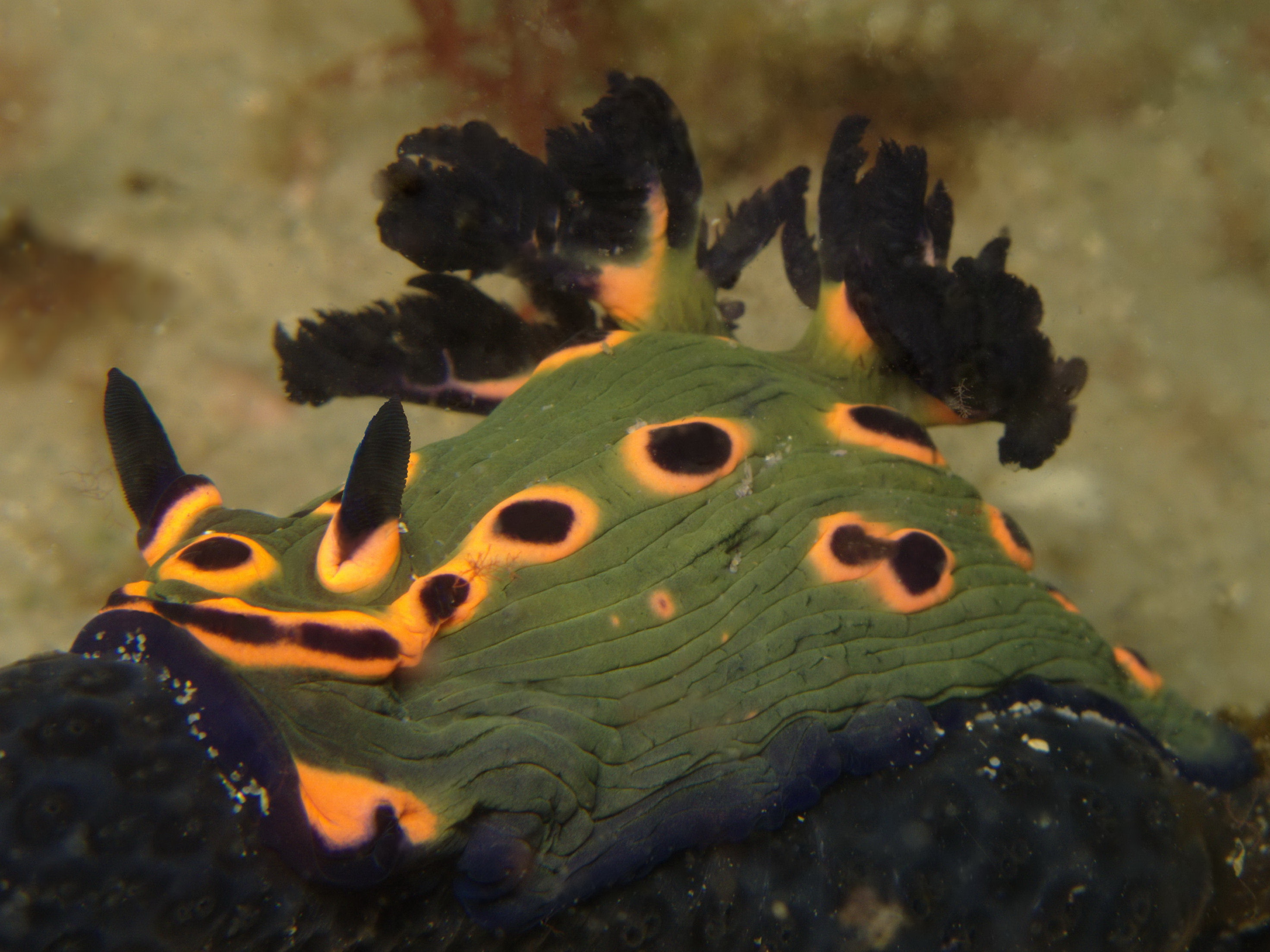
- A live individual of Nembrotha rosannulata, head end towards the left

Scientific classification
- Kingdom: Animalia
- Phylum: Mollusca
- Class: Gastropoda
- Order: Nudibranchia
- Family: Polyceridae
- Genus: Nembrotha
- Species: N. rosannulata

Binomial name
- Nembrotha rosannulata Pola, Cervera & Gosliner, 2008
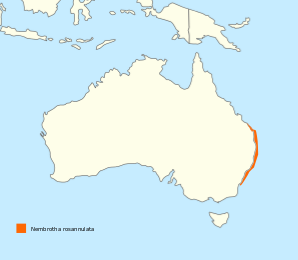

= Nembrotha rosannulata =

Species of gastropod

Nembrotha rosannulata is a species of colorful sea slug, a dorid nudibranch, a marine gastropod mollusk in the family Polyceridae. It was first described in 2008.

== Distribution ==
This species is known only from Eastern Australia (Northern New South Wales and Southern Great Barrier Reef). It is most commonly seen at Cabbage Tree Island, Port Stephens, NSW.

== Description ==
Nembrotha rosannulata is a large dull green nembrothid that grows to at least 12 cm in length. The body is textured with rounded longitudinal ridges and scattered raised pustules of various sizes. The pustules are black and each is surrounded by a pink ring which give this species its characteristic colour pattern - and name. The rhinophores are black, and the pink rhinophores sheaths are edged in black. The front of the mantle has a pink band which is edged in black, and the oral tentacles are pink with black tips. The gill stalks and branches are pink while the gill pinnae are black.

== Ecology ==
Present information suggest that this nudibranch feeds exclusively on the stalked ascidian Sigillina cyanea.
