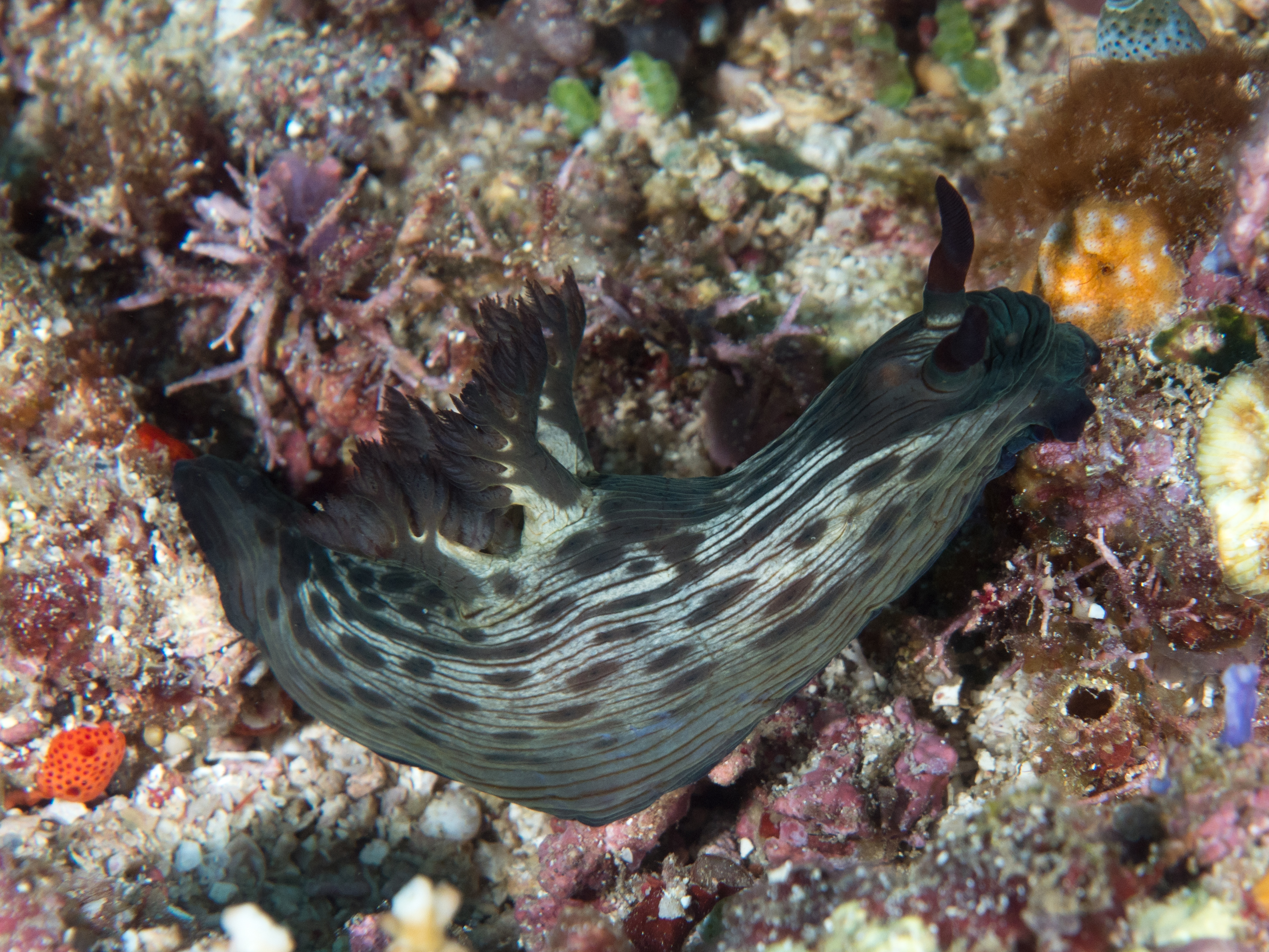

Scientific classification
- Kingdom: Animalia
- Phylum: Mollusca
- Class: Gastropoda
- Order: Nudibranchia
- Family: Polyceridae
- Genus: Nembrotha
- Species: N. mullineri

Binomial name
- Nembrotha mullineri Gosliner & Behrens, 1997

= Nembrotha mullineri =

Species of gastropod

Nembrotha mullineri is a species of colourful sea slug, a dorid nudibranch, a marine gastropod mollusk in the family Polyceridae. It was first described in 1997.

== Distribution ==
This species is known only from the Philippines.

== Description ==
Nembrotha mullineri is a white-black nembrothid that grows to at least 50 mm in length. The body is creamy-white, with longitudinal black-brown lines. The rhinophores and gills are black.

== Ecology ==
Nembrotha mullineri eats colonial ascidians.
