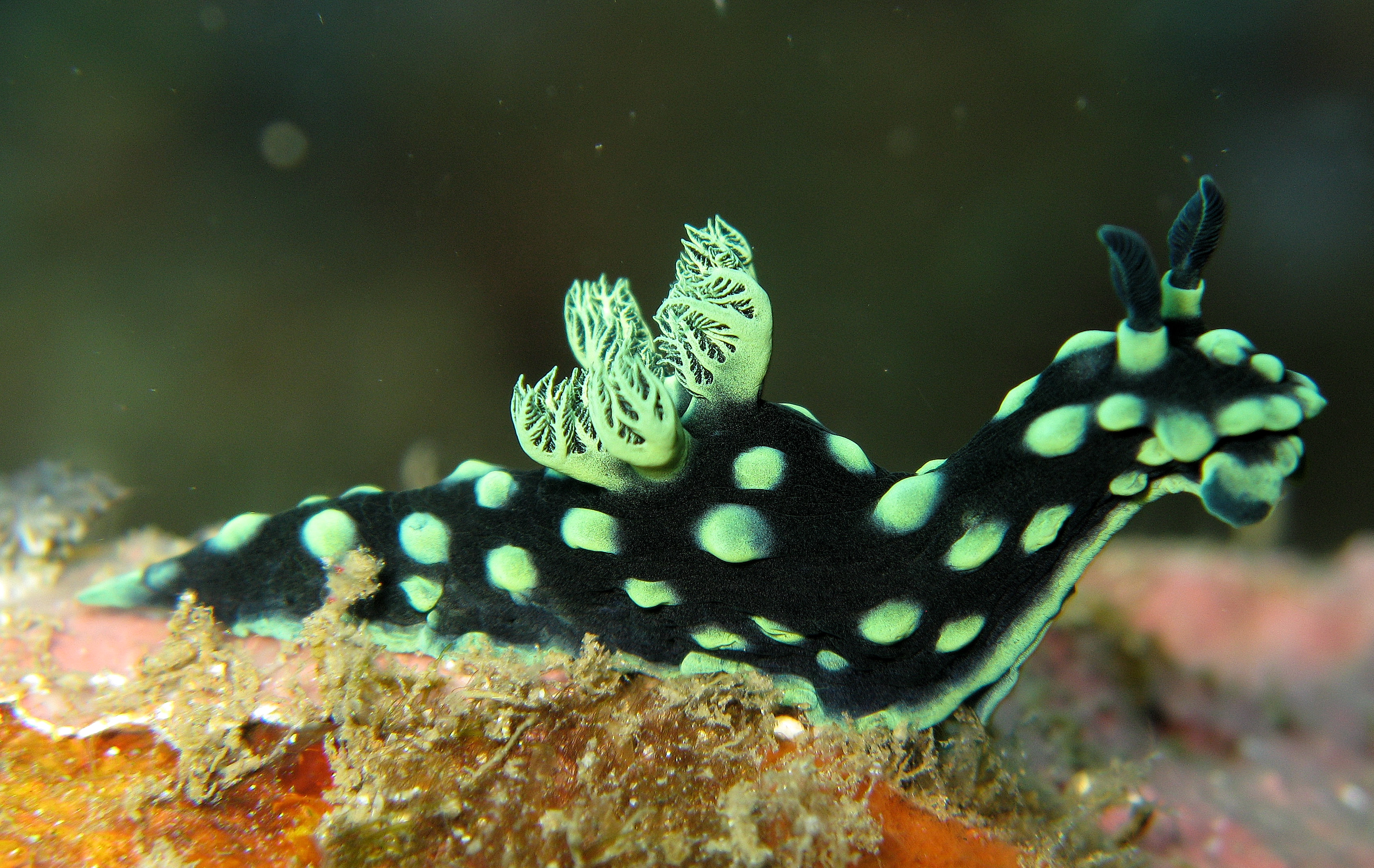
- Side view
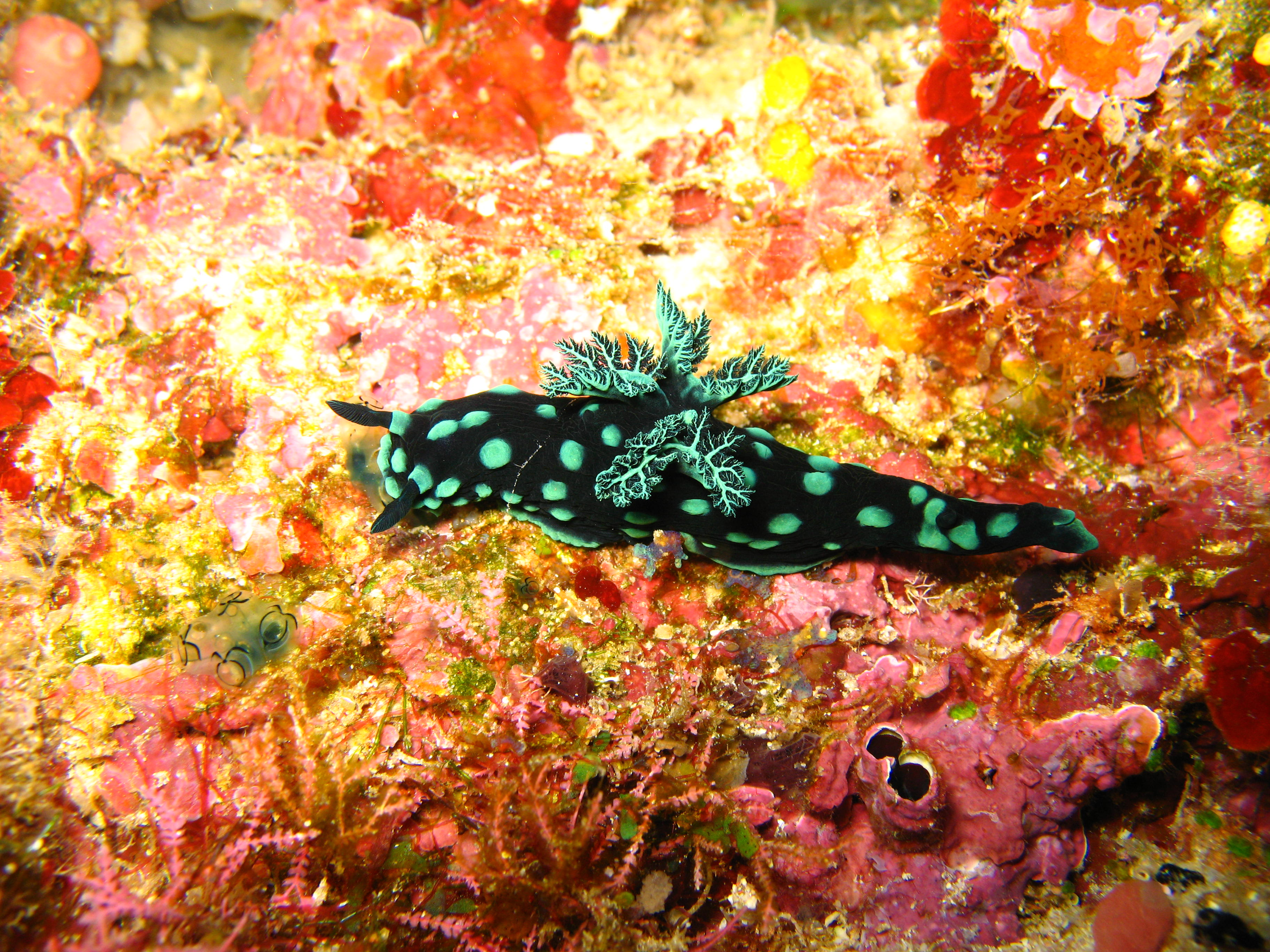
- Top view in Bunaken National Park

Scientific classification
- Kingdom: Animalia
- Phylum: Mollusca
- Class: Gastropoda
- Order: Nudibranchia
- Family: Polyceridae
- Genus: Nembrotha
- Species: N. cristata

Binomial name
- Nembrotha cristata Bergh, 1877

= Nembrotha cristata =

Species of gastropod

Nembrotha cristata is a species of colourful sea slug, a polycerid nudibranch, a marine gastropod mollusk in the family Polyceridae. This species of sea slug is black with green markings; adults are around 50 mm long, and they live on rock or coral reefs in the tropical Indo-West Pacific Ocean.

== Description ==
Nembrotha cristata is a large black nembrothine ("nembrothid" in much of the literature) growing to at least 50 mm long. Its body is covered with raised green nodules. The rhinophores and gills are black-edged in green. Other than the difference in colour, this species is similar in appearance to Nembrotha yonowae.

== Distribution ==
This nudibranch species was described from the Philippines. It occurs in the tropical Indo-West Pacific Ocean. It lives at depths between three and twenty metres. These sea slugs live on coral or rock reefs and have a lifespan of up to a year.

== Behaviour ==
The bright colours of this nudibranch species are an aposematic warning to predators. These sea slugs eat compound tunicates. Like all opisthobranchs, they are hermaphrodites.
