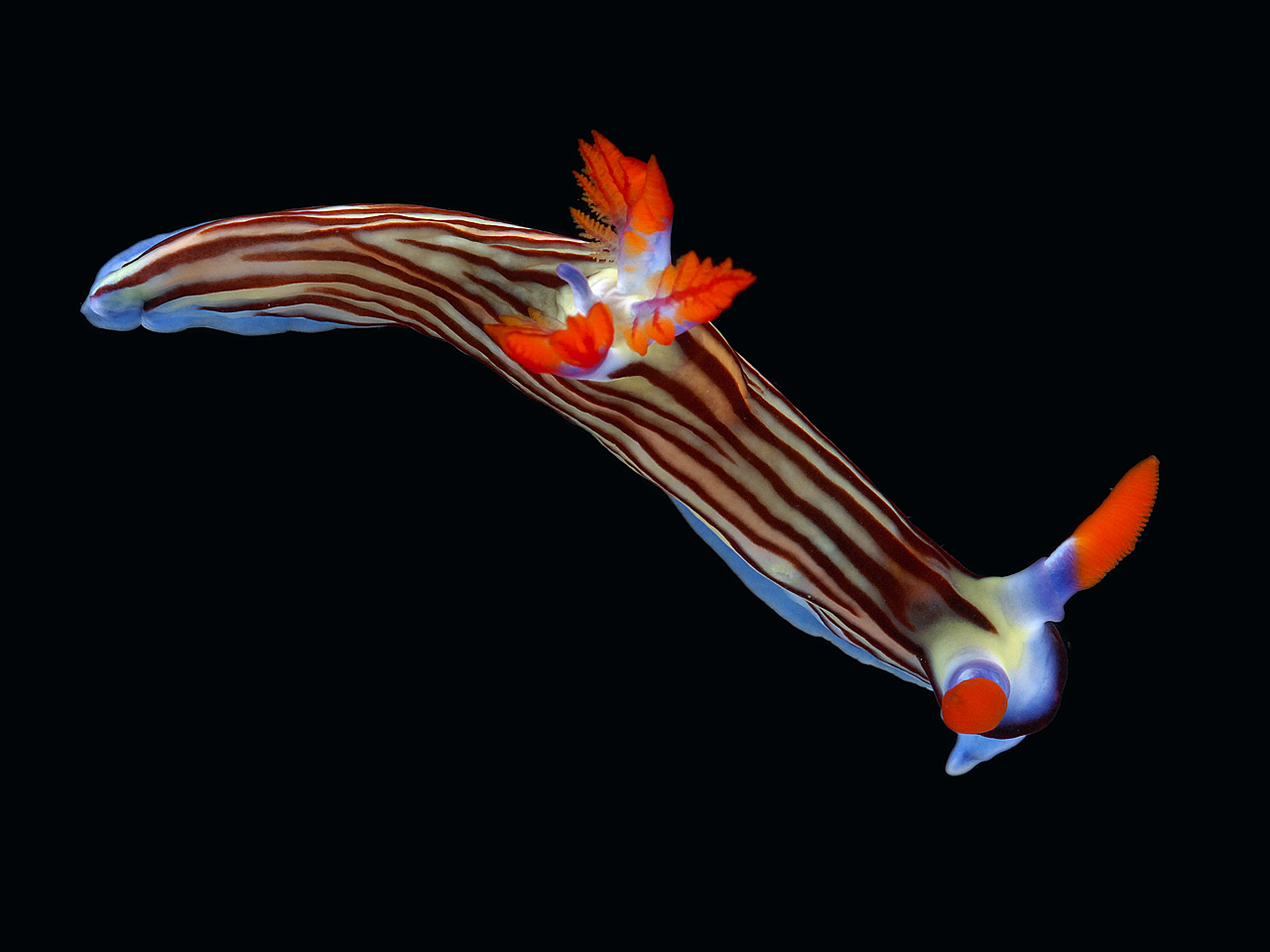
- Kinondo, Diani, Kenya

Scientific classification
- Kingdom: Animalia
- Phylum: Mollusca
- Class: Gastropoda
- Order: Nudibranchia
- Family: Polyceridae
- Genus: Nembrotha
- Species: N. aurea

Binomial name
- Nembrotha aurea Pola, Cervera & Gosliner, 2008

= Nembrotha aurea =

Species of gastropod

Nembrotha aurea is a species of colourful sea slug, a dorid nudibranch, a marine gastropod mollusk in the subfamily Nembrothinae in the family Polyceridae. It was first described in 2008.

== Distribution ==
The type locality of this species is Msimbati, Mtwara Region, Tanzania. It has only ever been recorded from the Western Indian ocean.

== Description ==
Nembrotha aurea is a large nembrothid that grows to at least 30 mm in length. The colour is white or creamy, overlaid with undefined patches of yellow and orange. The body is marked with brown longitudinal lines, the width and quantity of which vary from specimen to specimen, ranging from many thin evenly-spaced lines that run longitudinally from rhinophores to tail. The rhinophore clubs and gill pinnae are a bright red. The rhinophore sheathes and gill stalks are commonly coloured a combination of purple and bright electric blue, but in some specimens blue-purple markings are faint and instead mostly white.

It has been recently discovered that a large portion of animals identified as N. aurea are in fact their own separate species, Nembrotha lorosae. The two can be differentiated fairly easily on visuals alone, as N. aurea has rather thin brown lines that do not coalesce into patches anterior and posterior to the gills as N. lorosae does. Additionally, N. aurea distribution is now restricted to the western Indiana ocean, and all N. lorosae specimens have occurred in Australian and Indonesian waters.

== Ecology ==
Nembrotha aurea eats colonial ascidians.
