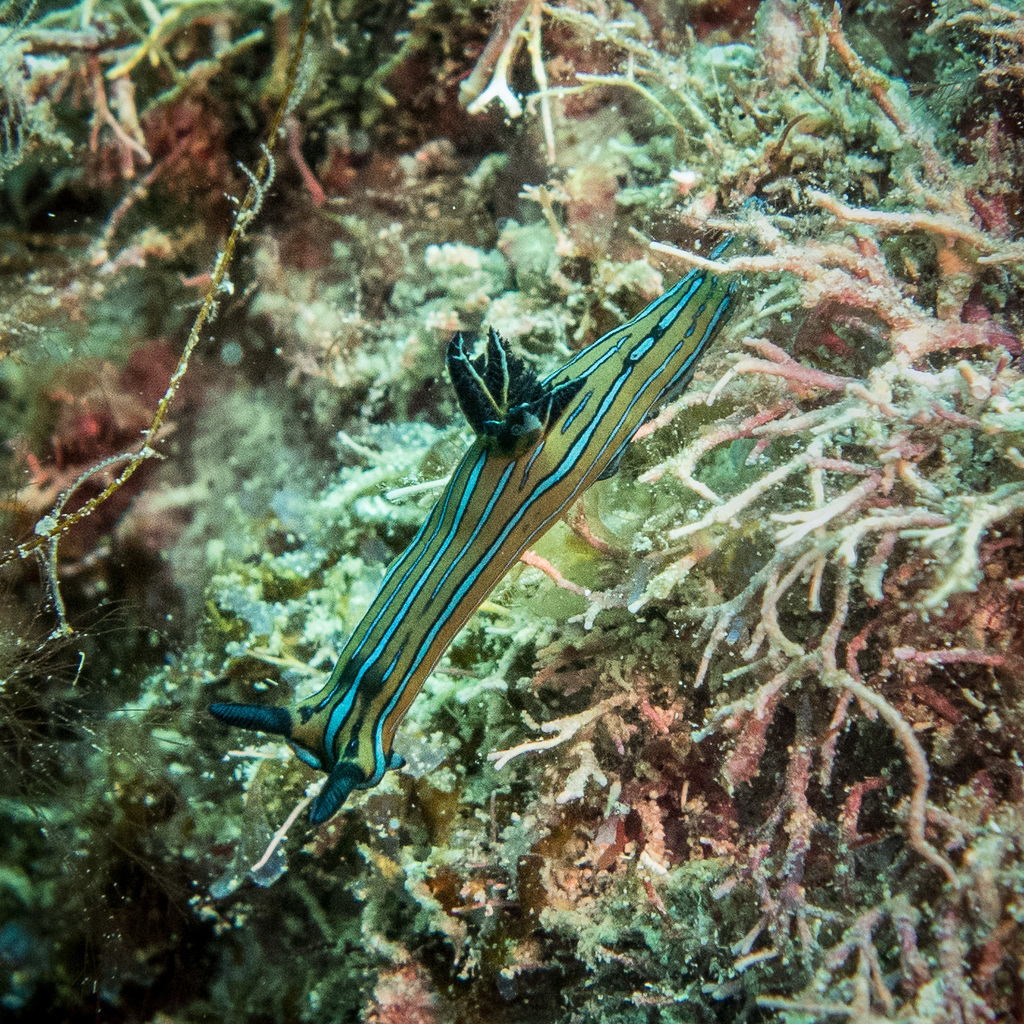

Scientific classification
- Kingdom: Animalia
- Phylum: Mollusca
- Class: Gastropoda
- Order: Nudibranchia
- Family: Polyceridae
- Genus: Tambja
- Species: T. eliora

Binomial name
- Tambja eliora (Er. Marcus & Ev. Marcus, 1967)

Synonyms
- Nembrotha eliora Er. Marcus & Ev. Marcus, 1967; Nembrotha hubbsi Lance, 1968

= Tambja eliora =

Species of gastropod

Tambja eliora is a species of sea slug, a dorid nudibranch, a marine gastropod mollusk in the family Polyceridae.

== Distribution ==
This species was originally described from the Gulf of California.
