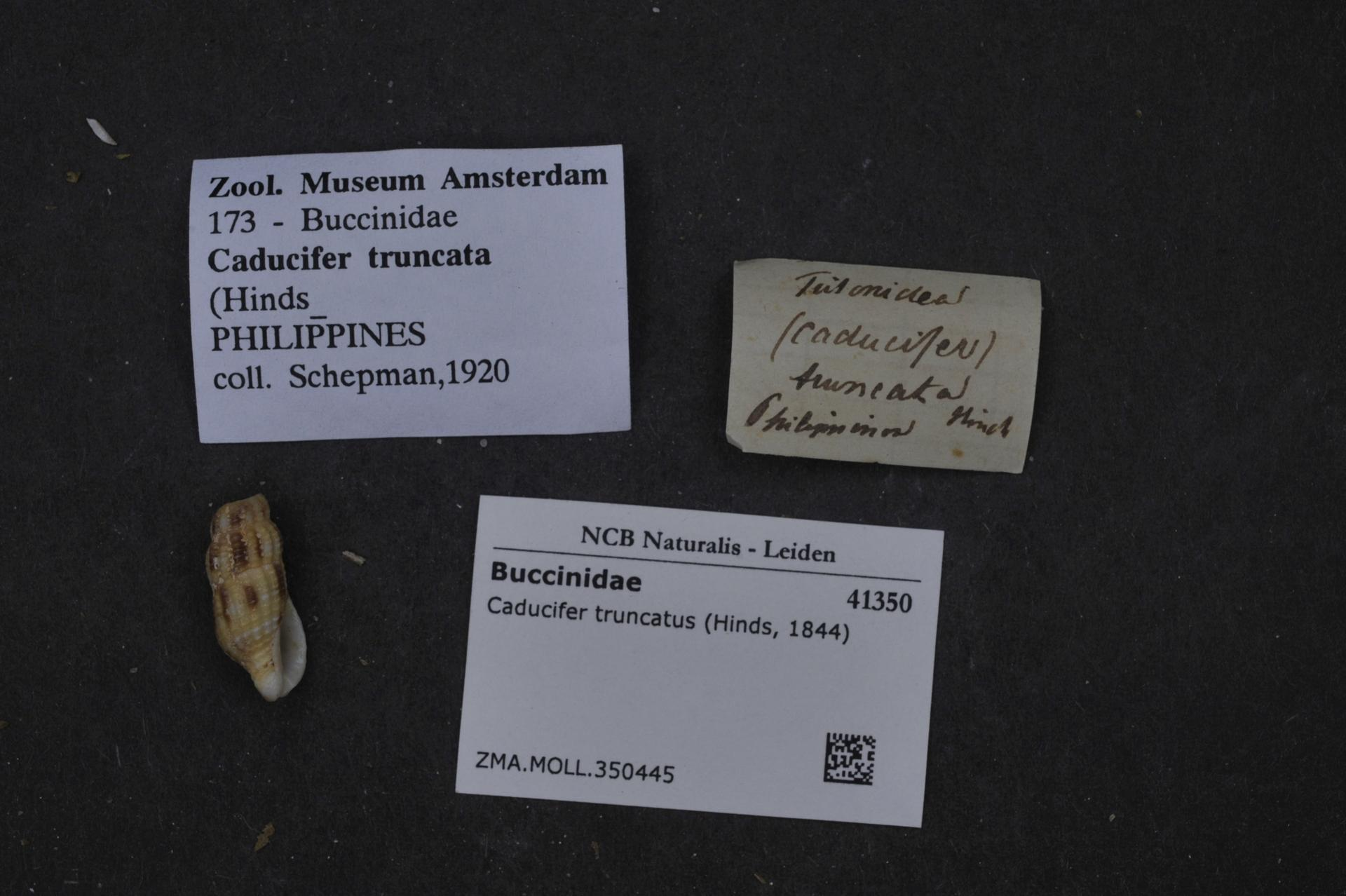

Scientific classification
- Kingdom: Animalia
- Phylum: Mollusca
- Class: Gastropoda
- Subclass: Caenogastropoda
- Order: Neogastropoda
- Family: Prodotiidae
- Genus: Caducifer
- Species: C. truncatus

Binomial name
- Caducifer truncatus (Hinds, 1844)

Synonyms
- Caducifer truncata [sic] (misspelling); Pisania truncatus Hinds; Triton truncatus Hinds, 1844 (basionym)

= Caducifer truncatus =

Species of gastropod

Caducifer truncatus is a species of sea snail, a marine gastropod mollusc in the family Prodotiidae.

== Description ==
Shell size 17 mm.

(Original description) The shell is elongately turreted and lacks a varix. The spire is considerably decollated. The whorls are longitudinally and concentrically ridged, and are transversely crossed by fine, raised striae. The coloration is yellowish-orange, ornamented with rows of large brown spots. The siphonal canal is very short.

The species is closely allied to the Pisania group of species, but is more terebriform, the aperture is shorter and the labial denticles are fewer in number and more widely spaced. The species is variable in colour, but is generally leaden-grey or brown, and ornamented with spiral and axial white lines.

== Distribution ==
This species occurs in the Indian Ocean off the Aldabra Atoll and the Mascarene Basin.Western Australia.
