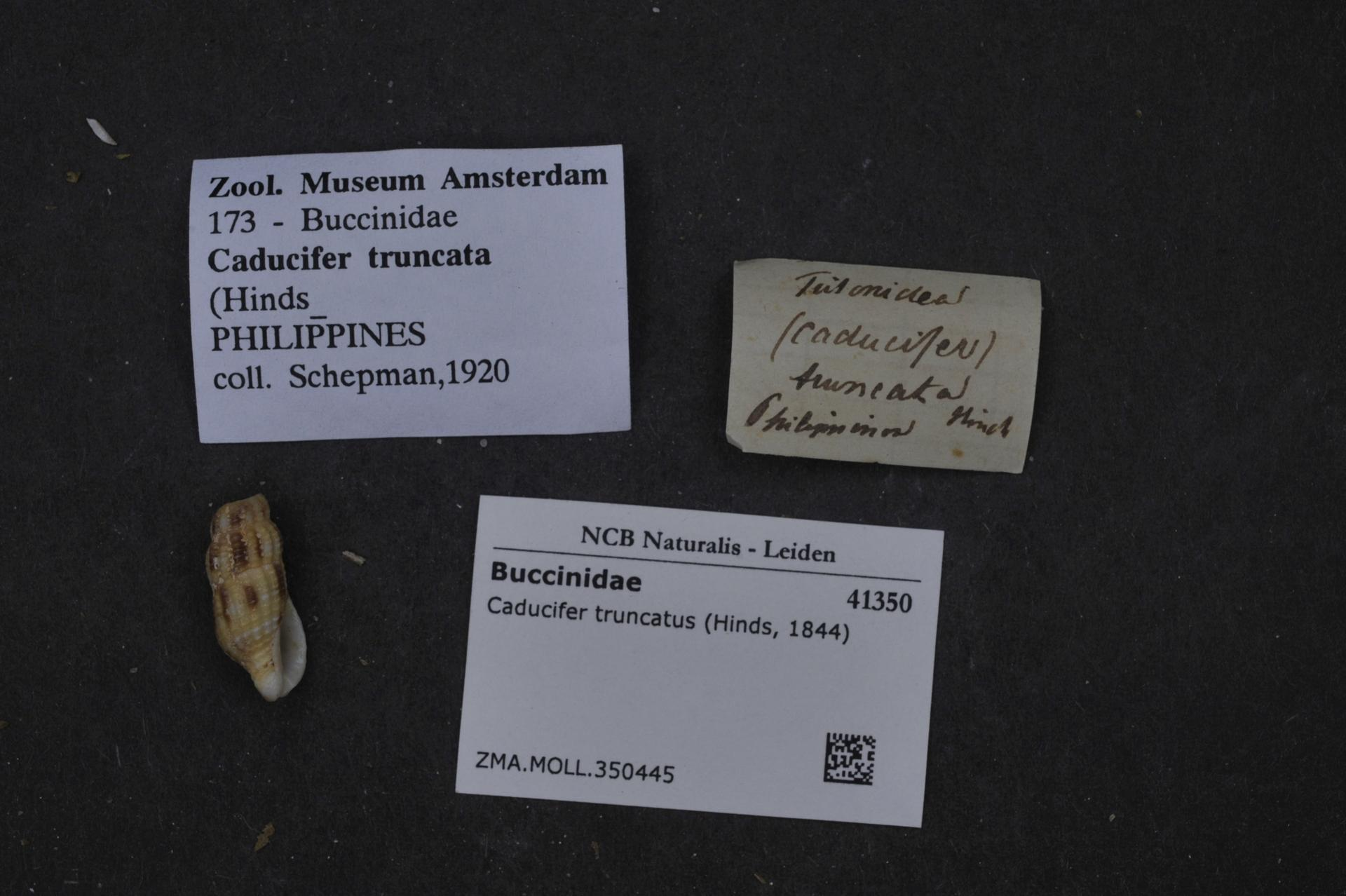
- Caducifer truncatus

Scientific classification
- Kingdom: Animalia
- Phylum: Mollusca
- Class: Gastropoda
- Subclass: Caenogastropoda
- Order: Neogastropoda
- Superfamily: Buccinoidea
- Family: Prodotiidae
- Genus: Caducifer; Dall, 1904

Type species
- Triton truncatus Hinds, 1844

= Caducifer =

Genus of gastropods

Caducifer is a genus of sea snails, marine gastropod mollusks in the family Prodotiidae.

== General characteristics ==
(Original description) The shell is small and subcylindrical, with the upper fourth of the spire self-amputated in the adult stage. It bears a single terminal varix. The sculpture consists of distinct axial ribs intersected by fine spiral threading, while the sutures are closely appressed. The nature of the nucleus and the presence or form of the operculum remain unknown.

== Species ==
Species within the genus Caducifer include:

- Caducifer camelopardalus Watters, 2009
- Caducifer concinnus (Reeve, 1844)
- Caducifer decapitatus (Reeve, 1844)
- Caducifer englerti (Hertlein, 1960)
- Caducifer truncatus (Hinds, 1844)

Species brought into synonymy

- Caducifer atlanticus Coelho, Matthews & Cardosa, 1970: synonym of Monostiolum atlanticum (Coelho, Matthews & Cardoso, 1970)
- Caducifer cinis (Reeve, 1846): synonym of Engina cinis (Reeve, 1846)
- Caducifer crebristriatus (Carpenter, 1856): synonym of Monostiolum crebristriatus (Carpenter, 1856)
- Caducifer nebulosus (Gould, 1860): synonym of Zafrona isomella (Duclos, 1840)
- Caducifer nigricostatus (Reeve, 1846): synonym of Monostiolum nigricostatum (Reeve, 1846)
- Caducifer truncata [sic]: synonym of Caducifer truncatus (Hinds, 1844)
- Caducifer weberi Watters, 1983: synonym of Bailya weberi (Watters, 1983) (original combination)
