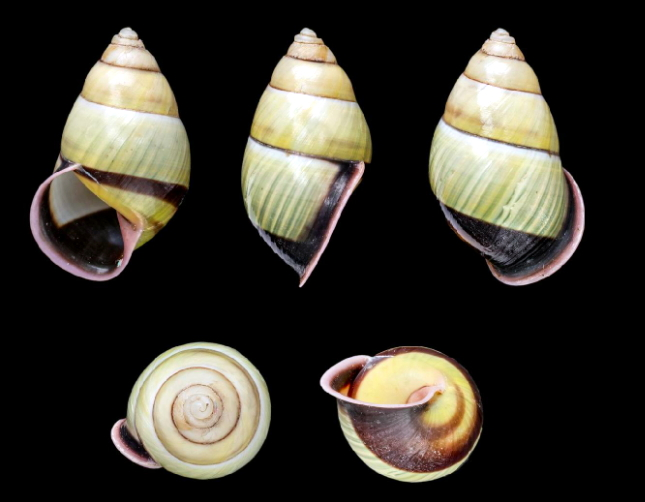
- Shell of Amphidromus pankowskianus (holotype at the Natural History Museum, London)

Scientific classification
- Kingdom: Animalia
- Phylum: Mollusca
- Class: Gastropoda
- Order: Stylommatophora
- Family: Camaenidae
- Genus: Amphidromus
- Species: A. pankowskianus

Binomial name
- Amphidromus pankowskianus Thach, 2020

= Amphidromus pankowskianus =

Species of tree snail

Amphidromus pankowskianus is a species of air-breathing tree snail, an arboreal gastropod mollusk in the family Camaenidae.

== Description ==
The shell is medium in size (height 30.8–39.9 mm, width 17.2–19.2 mm). it exhibits chirality dimorphism, and presents an elongate to ovate conical shape that is rather thin and glossy. The spire appears conical. The apex is acute and light brown, lacking a black spot on its tip. Comprising six to seven nearly smooth whorls, the shell displays a wide and depressed suture, and the body whorl is rounded. The periostracum is usually deciduous, sometimes showing yellowish-green radial streaks that appear more conspicuous on the body whorl and faded on earlier whorls. The body whorl lacks or features a narrow to wide brownish spiral band on the periphery; a varix is absent. The parietal callus is thin and transparent. The aperture is ovate; the peristome. Ts expanded and not reflected. The outer lip appears pale purplish-pink. The outer palatal wall shows a dark radial band just next to the expanded lip (also visible on the inner wall), and a brownish radial band encircles the umbilicus (though sometimes absent). The umbilicus is narrowly opened.

The genital organs feature a relatively short atrium. The penis appears enlarged and conical, measuring almost the length of the vagina. The penial retractor muscle is thin and inserts on the epiphallus close to the penis. The epiphallus is a thin and long slender tube, approximately as long as the penis. The flagellum is short, extending from the epiphallus, measuring about half the penis length, and terminating in a slightly enlarged coil. The appendix is a short, slender tube, nearly as long as the epiphallus. The vas deferens is a slender tube passing from the free oviduct and terminating at the epiphallus-flagellum junction. The internal wall of the penis is corrugated, exhibiting a series of weak longitudinal penial pilasters that form a fringe around the penial wall, and presents a smooth wall around the base of the penial verge. The penial verge is very short and conical with an opening at the tip.

The vagina is slender and cylindrical, approximately as long as the penis. The gametolytic duct is a cylindrical tube with a diameter similar to the vagina, then tapering to a slender tube terminally and connecting to an enlarged elliptical gametolytic sac (which was missing during dissection). The free oviduct is short; the oviduct forms lobule alveoli. The internal wall of the vagina possesses smooth ridges near the genital orifice; these ridges become swollen and form corrugated longitudinal vaginal pilasters in the middle, and exhibit deep crenelations close to the free oviduct opening.

== Distribution ==
This species is endemic to Vietnam.
