= Melanella major =

- Shell of Melanella major

Scientific classification
- Kingdom: Animalia
- Phylum: Mollusca
- Class: Gastropoda
- Subclass: Caenogastropoda
- Order: Littorinimorpha
- Family: Eulimidae
- Genus: Melanella
- Species: M. major

Binomial name
- Melanella major (G. B. Sowerby I, 1834)

Synonyms
- Balcis thaanumi (Pilsbry, 1917) ·; Eulima major G. B. Sowerby I, 1834; Melanella thaanumi Pilsbry, 1917; Melanella thaanumii [sic] (misspelling)

Species of gastropod

Melanella major is a species of sea snail, a marine gastropod mollusk in the family Eulimidae. The species is one of many species known to exist within the genus, Melanella.

== Description ==
(Described as Melanella thaanumi) The shell is white, slightly transparent, and rather solid. It shows a strongly developed curvature in two directions. The whorls are very slightly convex, and each is marked with one varix. The varices are an opaque white, with the series ascending the spire spirally on the right side and back, making between a fourth and a half turn. The aperture is ovate, and the outer lip arches very strongly forward. The shell has a length of 25 mm and a diameter of 7 mm, with a length of aperture measuring 6 mm. It consists of 13 whorls, though the apical ones have been lost. An immature specimen 19 mm long has 16 whorls, with the apex remaining perfect.

== Distribution ==
This species occurs in the Pacific Ocean off Hawaii.
