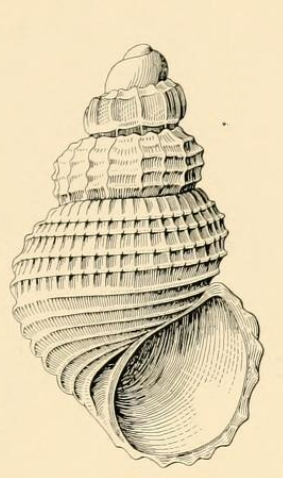
- Shell of Alvania filocincta (holotype)

Scientific classification
- Kingdom: Animalia
- Phylum: Mollusca
- Class: Gastropoda
- Subclass: Caenogastropoda
- Order: Littorinimorpha
- Superfamily: Rissooidea
- Family: Rissoidae
- Genus: Alvania
- Species: A. filocincta

Binomial name
- Alvania filocincta (Hedley & Petterd, 1906)

Synonyms
- Alvania (Linemera) filocincta (Hedley & Petterd, 1906) · alternate representation; Linemera filocincta (Hedley & Petterd, 1906); Rissoa filocincta Hedley & Petterd, 1906 (superseded combination)

= Alvania filocincta =

Species of gastropod

Alvania filocincta is a species of small sea snail, a marine gastropod mollusk or micromollusk in the family Rissoidae.

== Description ==
The length of the shell attains 3 mm, its diameter 1.7 mm.

(Original description) The small shell is opaque and rather solid, broadly ovate and narrowly perforate. It contains five whorls, of which 1½ compose the protoconch. They are ventricose, the earlier whorls are angled above, the body whorl rounded,. The whorls are rapidly increasing, not descending at the aperture and sharply constricted at the sutures.

Sculpture : the protoconch is smooth. In adult shell the radials first predominate, then gradually grow denser and finer and then are at body whorl exceeded by the spirals. The body whorl carries twelve sharp, erect, wide spaced spirals, of which the upper are latticed by forty-two radial riblets proceeding from the suture and fading at the periphery. Twenty stronger radial ribs, whose interstices are traversed by five spirals, cross the penultimate whorl. The remaining whorl and a half has twenty-one coarse, wide set radials, with a spiral thread above and below. The aperture is perpendicular ovate, fortified by a thick -outstanding varix.

== Distribution ==
This marine species is endemic to Australia and occurs off New South Wales, South Australia, Tasmania and Victoria.
