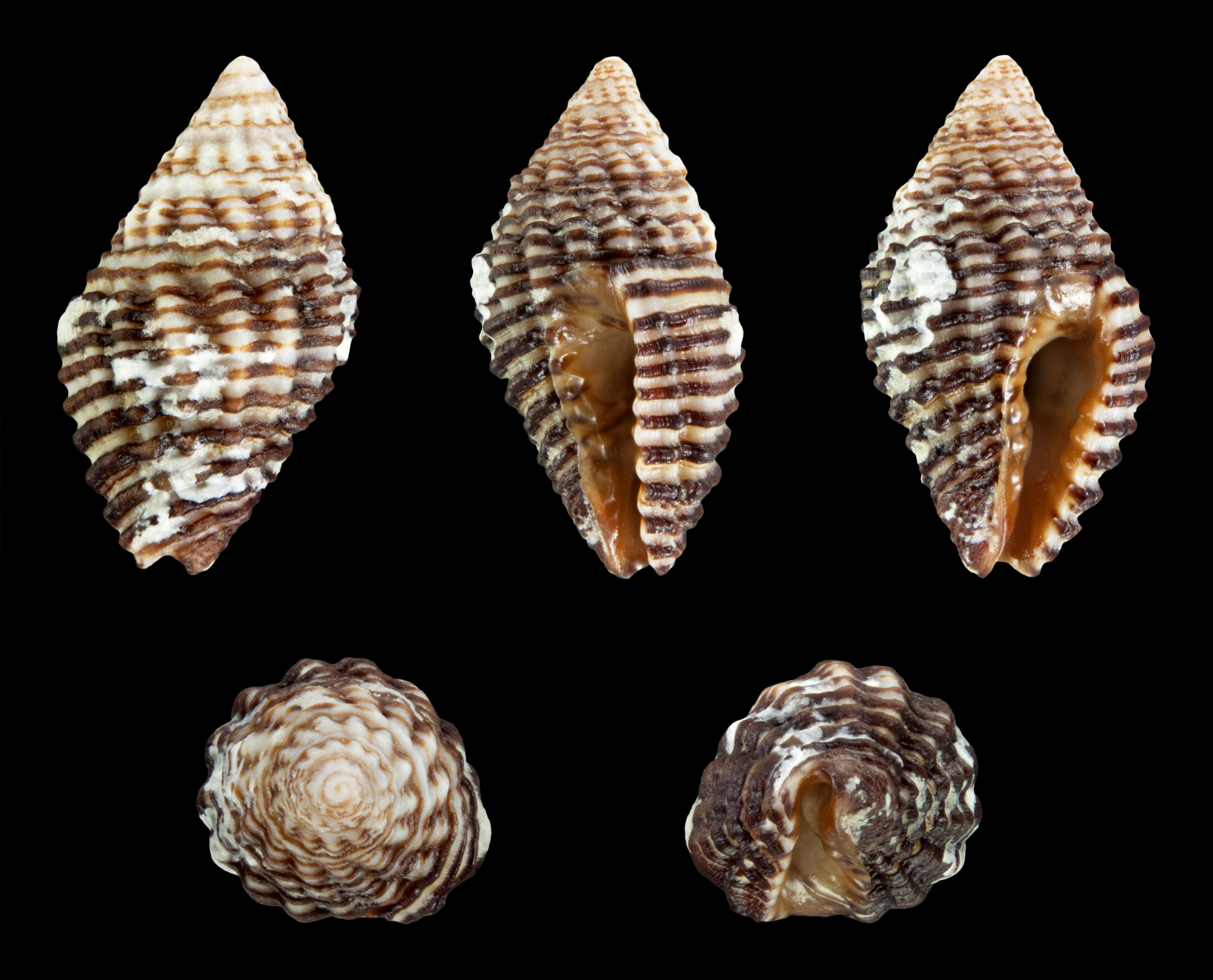

Scientific classification
- Kingdom: Animalia
- Phylum: Mollusca
- Class: Gastropoda
- Subclass: Caenogastropoda
- Order: Neogastropoda
- Family: Prodotiidae
- Genus: Clivipollia
- Species: C. incarnata

Binomial name
- Clivipollia incarnata (Deshayes, 1834)

Synonyms
- Engina incarnata (Deshayes, 1830); Engina paulucciae (Tapparone Canefri, 1879); Peristernia paulucciae Tapparone Canefri, 1879; Pollia incarnata (Deshayes, 1834); Turbinella incarnata Deshayes, 1830

= Clivipollia incarnata =

Species of gastropod

Clivipollia incarnata is a species of sea snail, a marine gastropod mollusk in the family Prodotiidae.

== Description ==
The shell is moderately small, ranging from 13 to 20 cm in length. It is dirty-white or creamy-yellow in colour, while the prominent spiral cords are a contrasting dark reddish-brown. The surface is sculptured with close-set, rounded axial ribs and elevated reddish-brown spiral cords. Macroscopically, the interstices of these spiral cords are finely axially striate and occasionally contain one or two very fine, secondary spiral threads.

The aperture is narrow and creamy-white with a slight pink hue, and the labial lip is adorned with seven to eight distinct denticles. The columella is heavily calloused along its entire length, distinctly denticulate, and becomes lirate as it extends onto the parietal wall. Finally, the siphonal canal is characteristically short and straight.

== Distribution ==
C. incarnata has an Indo-Pacific distribution, and has been recorded as far East as the Tonga Islands (leg. H. C. Gay). In the Fiji Islands the species is rare.
