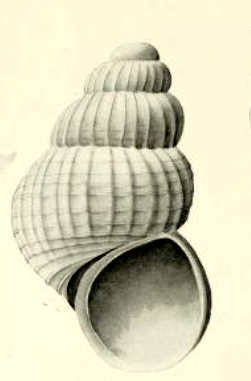
- Shell of Alvania verconiana (holotype)

Scientific classification
- Kingdom: Animalia
- Phylum: Mollusca
- Class: Gastropoda
- Subclass: Caenogastropoda
- Order: Littorinimorpha
- Superfamily: Rissooidea
- Family: Rissoidae
- Genus: Alvania
- Species: A. verconiana

Binomial name
- Alvania verconiana (Hedley, 1911)

Synonyms
- Alvania (Linemera) verconiana (Hedley, 1911) · alternate representation; Rissoa verconiana Hedley, 1911 (superseded combination)

= Alvania verconiana =

Species of gastropod

Alvania verconiana is a species of small sea snail, a marine gastropod mollusk or micromollusk in the family Rissoidae.

== Description ==
The length of the shell attains 2 mm, its diameter 1.25 mm.

(Original description) The small shell is ovate, thin and translucent. Its colour is white. It contains four rounded whorls, parted by deep sutures.

Sculpture: First whorl and a half are smooth The next show about twenty-five sharp though delicate radial ribs. These increase towards the body whorl. They amount to about forty. Below the periphery they fade gradually. Different individuals vary in the development and number of these radials. On the body whorl there are eight or ten spirals equal in grade to the radials that override them, thus enclosing rectangular meshes. On the upper whorls the spirals gradually vanish, so that on the base are spirals alone and on the upper whorls radials alone. A secondary microscopic sculpture of close spiral scratches is most conspicuous in the meshes of the body whorl.

The aperture is subcircular and angled above. The outer lip is fortified by a slight external varix. The columella margin is expanded and reflected over a small umbilical furrow.

== Distribution ==
This marine species is endemic to Australia and occurs off South Australia and Western Australia.
