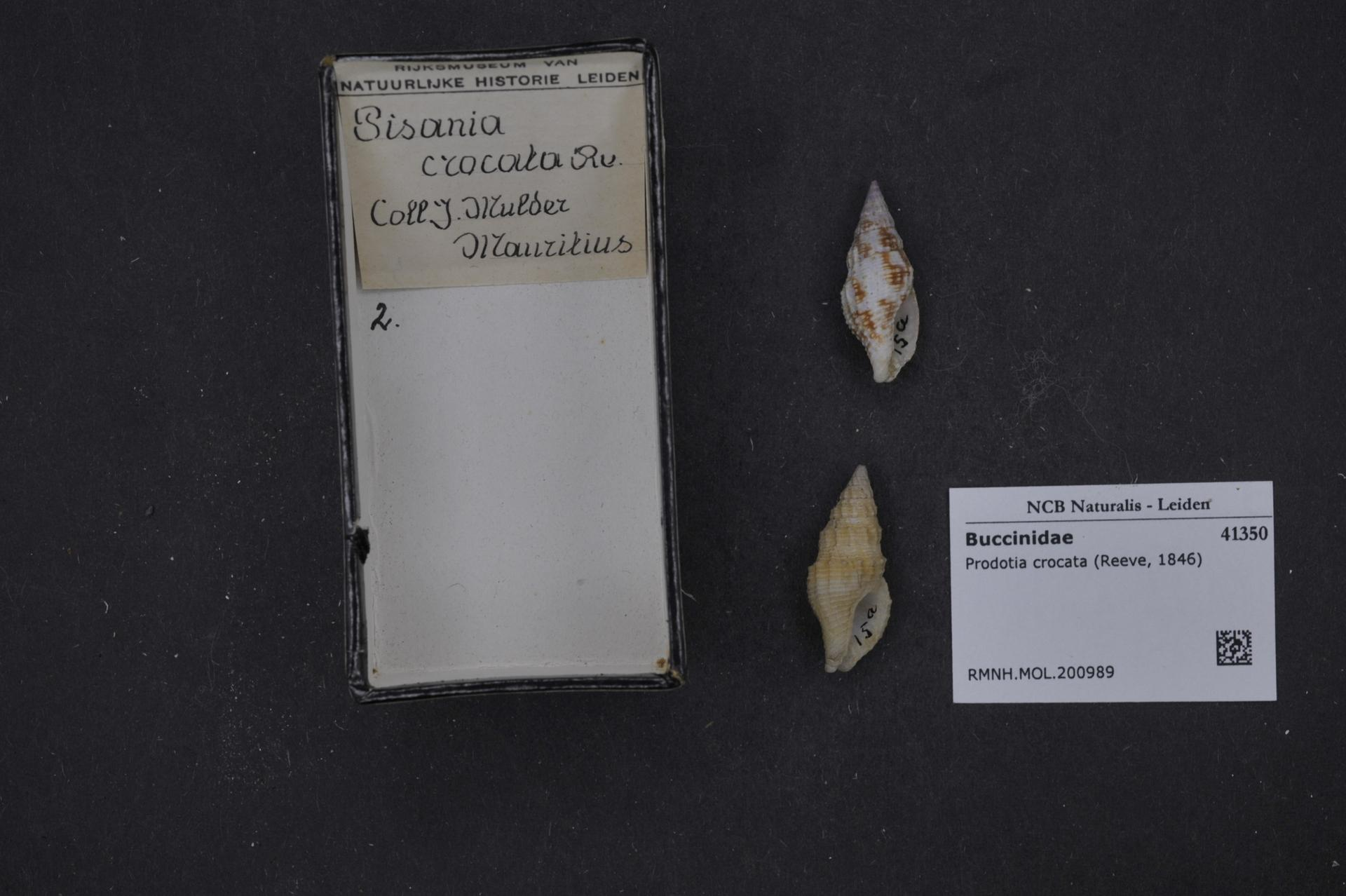

Scientific classification
- Kingdom: Animalia
- Phylum: Mollusca
- Class: Gastropoda
- Subclass: Caenogastropoda
- Order: Neogastropoda
- Family: Prodotiidae
- Genus: Prodotia
- Species: P. crocata

Binomial name
- Prodotia crocata (Reeve, 1846)

Synonyms
- Pisania crocata (Reeve, 1846)

= Prodotia crocata =

Species of gastropod

Prodotia crocata is a species of sea snail, a marine gastropod mollusc in the family Prodotiidae.

== Distribution ==
This species occurs in the Indian Ocean off the Mascarene Basin and Mauritius.
