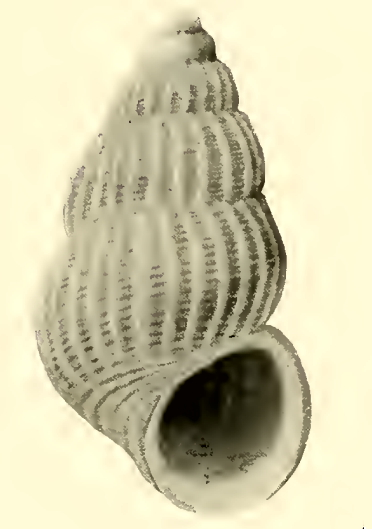
- Shell of Alvania profundicola (holotype)

Scientific classification
- Kingdom: Animalia
- Phylum: Mollusca
- Class: Gastropoda
- Subclass: Caenogastropoda
- Order: Littorinimorpha
- Superfamily: Rissooidea
- Family: Rissoidae
- Genus: Alvania
- Species: A. profundicola

Binomial name
- Alvania profundicola Bartsch, 1911

= Alvania profundicola =

Species of gastropod

Alvania profundicola is a species of small sea snail, a marine gastropod mollusk or micromollusk in the family Rissoidae.

== Description ==
The length of the shell attains 3.2 mm, its diameter 1.7 mm.

(Original description) The ovate shell is yellowish white, the protoconch yellow. The protoconch contains three whorls showing eight fine spiral lirations, which are about half as wide as the spaces that separate them. The spiral sulci between the lirations are crossed by quite regular, very slender axial threads, lending the surface of the protoconch a finely reticulated appearance. The whorls of the teleoconch are well rounded and weakly shouldered at the summit. They are marked by rather strong, very regular, curved axial ribs, of which 25 occur upon the first, 26 upon the second, and 32 upon the penultimate whorl. Intercostal spaces are about three times as wide as the ribs. They are crossed by fine spiral striations, of which the first below the summit is stronger than the rest and passes over the ribs, constricting them so as to form a series of crenulations at the suture. Anterior to this line the spiral striations are usually much enfeebled. On the body whorl there are about 12 of these lines between the periphery and the summit. The suture is strongly constricted. The periphery of the body whorl is well rounded. The base of the shell is well rounded, decidedly attenuated anteriorly. They are marked by the feeble continuations of the axial ribs, which become evanescent on the middle of the base, and seven subequal and subequally spaced spiral lirations. The aperture is subcircular. The posterior angle is obtuse. The outer lip is thin at the edge, re-enforced immediately behind the edge by a thick varix. The inner lip is slender, decidedly curved and reflected over and appressed to the base. The parietal wall is covered with a thick callus, which renders the peritreme complete.

== Distribution ==
This species occurs in the Pacific Ocean off the Galapagos Islands
