= Volvarina pacificotica =

Scientific classification
- Kingdom: Animalia
- Phylum: Mollusca
- Class: Gastropoda
- Subclass: Caenogastropoda
- Order: Neogastropoda
- Family: Marginellidae
- Subfamily: Marginellinae
- Genus: Volvarina
- Species: V. pacificotica

Binomial name
- Volvarina pacificotica Espinosa, Ortea & Magaña, 2018

Species of gastropod

Volvarina pacificotica is a species of sea snail, a marine gastropod mollusk in the family Marginellidae, the margin snails.

== Description ==
The length of the shell attains 11 mm, its diameter 5 mm.

- Medium-sized, smooth, and shiny shell with a sub-cylindrical elongated and wide shape (Id= 2.02).
- Moderately convex on both sides when viewed orally.
- Acute spire (Av= 80°), extended (17%), almost wide and protruding, formed by three whorls.
- The protoconch is large, globular, and has a noticeable nucleus.
- The fourth and final whorl occupies 83% of the total length of the shell when viewed dorsally.
- The aperture is elongated, narrow at the posterior portion, and wider at the anterior portion.
- The outer lip lacks the post-labral varix in the holotype, making it sharp and cutting.
- Columella with four uneven and well-marked folds, with the anterior two being the most developed.
- Uniform background color in shades of orange-pink, with the protoconch and columellar folds having a lighter color.

== Appearance and Internal Organs ==
- The body of the live animal outside the shell is translucent (pearl gray) with small snowy-white and red spots.
- The posterior portion protrudes behind the shell by 10 to 20% of its length.
- The siphon exhibits a similar coloration, with larger red spots.
- The mantle covers almost the entire shell when at rest, displaying the same coloration as the dorsal side of the foot, with greater density and intensity at the edges.
- The shell is orange-amber and translucent, revealing three series of somewhat grouped greenish-gray spots in spiral bands when viewed in transparency.

The internal organs of the animal:

- Leiblen's organ is pear-shaped, measuring 1 mm in length, and the Leiblen's duct is more than 10 times its length.
- The radula, obtained from the anterior portion of the holotype, is short, with a large formation sac containing seven plates and a total of 42 plates in the ribbon.

== Etymology ==
The species name "pacificotica" is derived from "Pacifico," referring to the Pacific Ocean, and "tica," indicating the origin in Costa Rica.

== Distribution ==
This marine species occurs off Costa Rica, Caribbean Sea.

== Discovery ==
Three specimens were collected alive on February 17, 2003, from sandy and rocky bottoms at depths between 15 and 20 meters in the Manuel Antonio National Park, Puntarenas, Pacific Ocean, Costa Rica.

== Discussion ==
- Volvarina pacificotica is the first species formally recorded for the coasts of the Pacific Ocean in Costa Rica.
- The taxonomic status of V. taeniolata is acknowledged as complex and difficult, and Volvarina pacificotica is distinguished from all known descriptions and figures attributed to V. taeniolata by several characteristics, including its acute spire, extended and almost wide shape, and a uniform orange-pink color pattern without clear bands.
