= Melanella bovicornu =

- Shell of Melanella bovicornu (original image)

Scientific classification
- Kingdom: Animalia
- Phylum: Mollusca
- Class: Gastropoda
- Subclass: Caenogastropoda
- Order: Littorinimorpha
- Family: Eulimidae
- Genus: Melanella
- Species: M. bovicornu

Binomial name
- Melanella bovicornu Pilsbry, 1905

Synonyms
- Eulima bovicornu Pilsbry, 1905

Species of gastropod

Melanella bovicornu is a species of sea snail, a marine gastropod mollusk in the family Eulimidae. The species is one of many species known to exist within the genus, Melanella.

== Description ==
The length of the shell attains 15 mm, its diameter 4.7 mm.

(Original description) The shell is moderately solid but not thick. it is white, and glossy. The spire tapers regularly and is attenuate near the apex; it is strongly bent to the right and backwards.

There are about 13 slightly convex whorls, separated by only lightly impressed sutures. The varices are distinctly impressed, with one occurring on each whorl. All are situated on the right side, where they form a slowly receding, ascending line; each successive varix is very slightly in advance of the preceding one.

The aperture is ovate. The outer lip is obtuse, arches well forwards in the middle, and recedes above. The columella is short and concave, slightly calloused, but lacks a reflexed edge.
