= Bailya anomala =

Scientific classification
- Kingdom: Animalia
- Phylum: Mollusca
- Class: Gastropoda
- Subclass: Caenogastropoda
- Order: Neogastropoda
- Family: Pisaniidae
- Genus: Bailya
- Species: B. anomala

Binomial name
- Bailya anomala (Hinds, 1844)

Synonyms
- Bailya (Bailya) anomala (Hinds, 1844) alternative representation; Fusus bellus C. B. Adams, 1852 junior subjective synonym (invalid: junior homonym of Fusus...); Triton anomalus Hinds, 1844 (original combination)

Species of gastropod

Bailya anomala is a species of sea snail, a marine gastropod mollusc in the family Pisaniidae.

== Description ==
(Original description in Latin) The shell is ovate and brown, with strong longitudinal ribs crossed by raised transverse lines that form a cancellated pattern. The spire is approximately equal in length to the aperture, and the suture is pronounced. The shell is without varices. The aperture is oval and pale, with a rather short siphonal canal.

(Described as Fusus bellus) The shell is rather elongate and regularly fusiform. It is white, with reddish-brown spots arranged in spiral series, usually three on each whorl: one above and two below the middle. Each whorl bears approximately ten fairly narrow, prominent ribs, some of which are somewhat varix-like. These ribs are crossed by raised spiral lines, producing nodulose intersections, together with additional spiral striae.

The apex is acute, and the spire is conical. The shell comprises seven very convex whorls, separated by a moderately impressed suture. The aperture is elongate-ovate, with a broad, moderately extended siphonal canal.

== Distribution ==
This species occurs off Coiba Island, Panama; further occurrences in the Caribbean Sea off Mexico, Costa Rica and Honduras.
