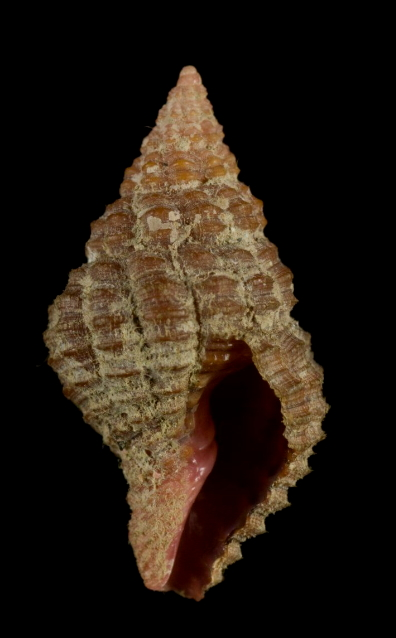
- Shell of Clivipollia pulchra (specimen at MNHN, Paris)

Scientific classification
- Kingdom: Animalia
- Phylum: Mollusca
- Class: Gastropoda
- Subclass: Caenogastropoda
- Order: Neogastropoda
- Family: Prodotiidae
- Genus: Clivipollia
- Species: C. pulchra

Binomial name
- Clivipollia pulchra (Reeve, 1846)

Synonyms
- Cantharus (Pollia) pulcher (Reeve, 1846); Clivipollia imperita Iredale, 1929; Engina papuensis (Tapparone Canefri, 1879); Peristernia elegans (Dunker, 1844) (nomen oblitum); Peristernia elegans var. papuensis Tapparone Canefri, 1879; Ricinula pulchra Reeve, 1846 (original combination); Turbinella elegans Küster, 1844 (nomen oblitum)

= Clivipollia pulchra =

Species of gastropod

Clivipollia pulchra is a species of sea snail, a marine gastropod mollusc in the family Prodotiidae.

== Description ==
Dimensions: Length: 29 mm, breadth: 13 mm

(Original description) The shell is small and regularly fusiform in shape. The spire is approximately equal to the length of the aperture, while the siphonal canal is slightly lengthened, narrow, and a little recurved.

The shell is a pale brownish cream, whereas the aperture is white.

Although the apical whorls are missing, eight adult whorls remain. These are sculptured with revolving cords that are over-ridden by longitudinal rounded ribs. On the body whorl, one may count a dozen major cords along with half a dozen minor ones, as well as about ten ribs with deep interstices. Additionally, a microscopic striation can be seen under a lens. The antepenultimate whorl shows half a dozen cords, while the preceding ones show four and then three; the longitudinal ribs decrease in number in the same manner. The sutures are well-marked but not channeled.

The aperture is slightly pear-shaped. The siphonal canal is narrow, open, and both lengthened and a little recurved. The columella is short and features two plaits, though these plaits are rather weak. The inner lip is slight, passing as a glaze toward the outer lip. This outer lip is thickened and a little incurved; it is not varicose, but it bears four strong nodules internally.

The shell of this species is reddish-brown and highly shining, accented by interstitial spiral grooves that are a contrasting dark brown. In a vivid shift of coloration, the siphonal canal, the nuclear whorls, and the aperture are all a delicate rosy-pink. Structurally, the siphonal canal is distinctly produced, while the axial ribs are tightly and close-set across the surface.

== Distribution ==
This marine species occurs in the Indo-West Pacific; also off Papua New Guinea, New Caledonia, Indonesia, Taiwan and Australia (Queensland).
