= Caducifer camelopardalus =

Scientific classification
- Kingdom: Animalia
- Phylum: Mollusca
- Class: Gastropoda
- Subclass: Caenogastropoda
- Order: Neogastropoda
- Family: Prodotiidae
- Genus: Caducifer
- Species: C. camelopardalus

Binomial name
- Caducifer camelopardalus Watters, 2009

Species of gastropod

Caducifer camelopardalus is a species of sea snail, a marine gastropod mollusk in the family Prodotiidae.

== Distribution ==
This snail is found in Brazil.
