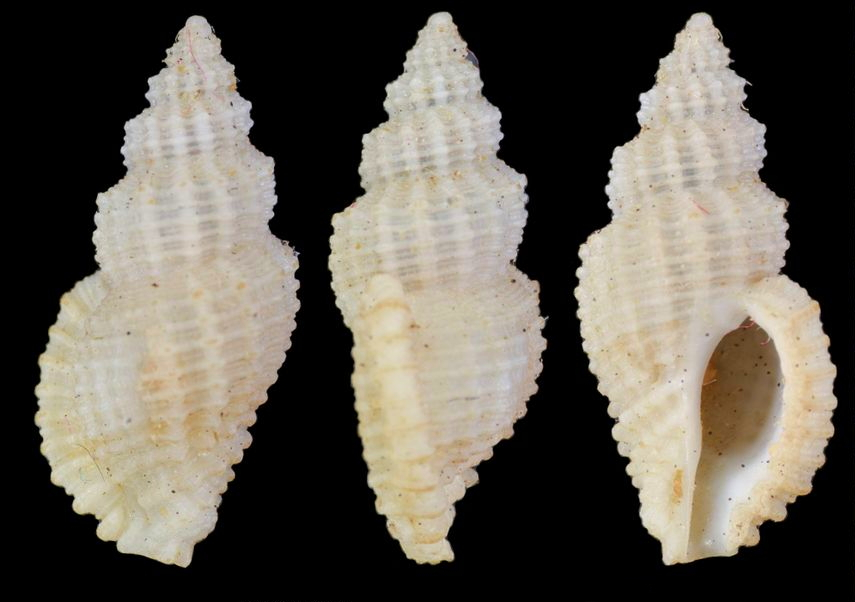
- Shell of Bailya intricata (specimen at the Bailey-Matthews National Shell Museum)

Scientific classification
- Kingdom: Animalia
- Phylum: Mollusca
- Class: Gastropoda
- Subclass: Caenogastropoda
- Order: Neogastropoda
- Family: Pisaniidae
- Genus: Bailya
- Species: B. intricata

Binomial name
- Bailya intricata (Dall, 1884)

Synonyms
- Bailya (Bailya) intricata (Dall, 1884) · alternative representation; Phos intricatus Dall, 1884 superseded combination

= Bailya intricata =

Species of gastropod

Bailya intricata is a species of sea snail, a marine gastropod mollusc in the family Pisaniidae.

== Description ==
The length of the shell attains 13.2 mm, its diameter 6.2 mm

(Original description) The shell consists of seven whorls. It is pale waxen in colour, covered by a yellowish-brown epidermis. It is solid in texture, with a strongly sculptured surface, a turreted spire, and a single oval varix. The nucleus is smooth and involved, resembling that of Neritula (H. Adams & A. Adams, 1853) (synonym of Tritia Risso, 1826), while the next two whorls are strongly cancellate and bear two particularly prominent spiral cords. The later whorls are subtabulate and moderately rounded, with a spiral sculpture composed of strong, rounded, evenly spaced primary threads separated by single, smaller intercalary threads. The third or fourth primary thread, counted forward from the suture, is more prominent than the others and forms the margin of the tabulation.

Anteriorly, the primary threads become more widely spaced, and the interspaces deepen. On the front of the body whorl, there are approximately fourteen primary threads beyond the marginal thread. All show traces of nodulation at their intersections with the transverse sculpture, while the anterior six threads are strongly nodulose, although the transverse sculpture is scarcely visible within the interspaces.

The transverse sculpture consists of approximately fourteen rounded ribs that cross the whorls but are largely overrun by the spiral threads. It is further marked by distinct growth lines. The aperture is bordered by a strong, rounded varix over which the sculpture continues uninterrupted, the shell appearing constricted both anterior and posterior to the varix. The aperture itself is relatively small and is polished white within, bearing five or six well-developed lirae on the inner surface of the outer lip, together with the usual tooth-like callus on the body whorl near the suture. The siphonal canal is short and slightly recurved, the suture is distinct, and the operculum is thin, brownish, and resembles that of Fusus.

== Distribution ==
The type locality ins in the Florida Keys; also found in the Caribbean Sea (Puerto Rico, Jamaica, Panama) and off the Bahamas.
