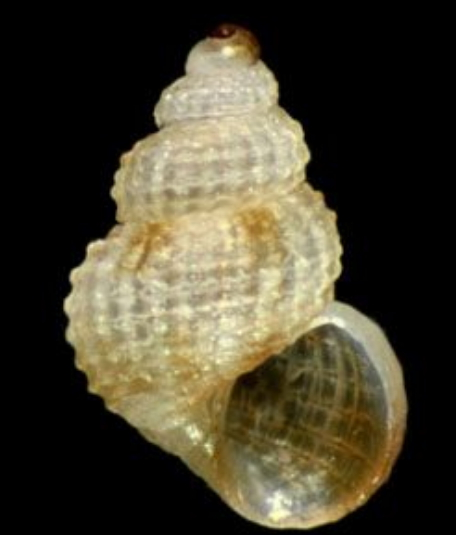
- Shell of Alvania tarsodes (specimen at the Natural History Museum, Rotterdam)

Scientific classification
- Kingdom: Animalia
- Phylum: Mollusca
- Class: Gastropoda
- Subclass: Caenogastropoda
- Order: Littorinimorpha
- Superfamily: Rissooidea
- Family: Rissoidae
- Genus: Alvania
- Species: A. tarsodes

Binomial name
- Alvania tarsodes (Watson, 1886)

Synonyms
- Rissoa (Alvania) tarsodes R. B. Watson, 1886; Rissoa tarsodes R. B. Watson, 1886

= Alvania tarsodes =

Species of gastropod

Alvania tarsodes is a species of small sea snail, a marine gastropod mollusk or micromollusk in the family Rissoidae.

== Description ==
The length of the shell attains 1.8 mm.

(Original description) The shell is ovate to oblong, conical and blunt tipped. It is white, rather finely reticulated, with a round aperture, and a remotely varixed thin-edged lip.

Sculpture : Longitudinals — there are about 20 sharpish rounded ribs, which, strong at the suture, die out rather suddenly toward the edge of the base. The last, which is rather remote from the lip-edge, is a broad strong varix, the shallow interstices are fully broader than the ribs.

Spirals — there are about eight sharpish threads, much like the ribs. The first is rather remote from the suture. The last two, which are in the middle of the base, are feeble, the shallow interstices are fully broader than the spirals.

The colour of the translucent shell is dull white.

The spire is rather high and conical. The apex blunt, the first two whorls being rather depressedly globose, and quite smooth. The shell contains 5 convex whorls, of regular increase. The suture is impressed, and very slightly oblique. The aperture is sub-oval, a little oblique to the axis and bluntly pointed above. The outer lip is expanded, with a thin-edged, remotely varixed lip. Its sweep is a very regular curve, and its front line level. The inner lip is not thick, but distinct on the body. On the columella it is narrow, sharp, and prominent, with a minute umbilical channel behind it.

== Distribution ==
This species occurs in the Atlantic Ocean off the Azores.
