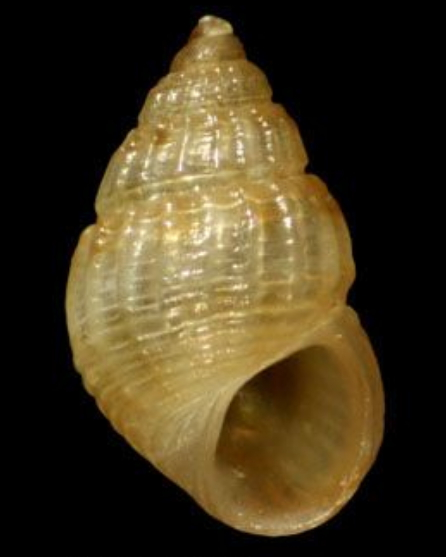
- Shell of Alvania novarensis (specimen at the Natural History Museum, Rotterdam)

Scientific classification
- Kingdom: Animalia
- Phylum: Mollusca
- Class: Gastropoda
- Subclass: Caenogastropoda
- Order: Littorinimorpha
- Superfamily: Rissooidea
- Family: Rissoidae
- Genus: Alvania
- Species: A. novarensis

Binomial name
- Alvania novarensis Frauenfeld, 1867

Synonyms
- Alvania firma (Laseron, 1956) junior subjective synonym; Alvania formosita (Laseron, 1956) junior subjective synonym; Alvania trajectus (R. B. Watson, 1886) junior subjective synonym; Haurakia firma Laseron, 1956 junior subjective synonym; Haurakia formosita Laseron, 1956 junior subjective synonym; Haurakia novarensis (Frauenfeld, 1867) superseded combination; Rissoa (Alvania) trajectus R. B. Watson, 1886 junior subjective synonym; Rissoa trajectus R. B. Watson, 1886

= Alvania novarensis =

Species of gastropod

Alvania novarensis is a species of small sea snail, a marine gastropod mollusk or micromollusk in the family Rissoidae.

== Description ==
The length of the shell attains 2.5 mm.

(Described as Rissoa (Alvania) trajectus) The small, white shell is strong, conic-obovate and reticulated. It has a tumid body whorl, a broad round base, a short spire, a few conical whorls, an excavated suture, and a short pear-shaped aperture.

Sculpture: Longitudinals — there are on the body whorl about 18 narrow, well-raised, rounded, slightly oblique ribs, which stop abruptly at the periphery. They are not present in the sutural channel, nor almost at all on the base. They are crowded on the earlier whorls, but on the body whorl the flat furrows which part them are wider than the ribs. The last rib broadens into a strong labral varix.

Spirals — above the periphery there are six distinct crowded rounded threads, which score the ribs. Below the last of these there is a little furrow, which forms the contraction for the suture. Below this on the base are about five rounded slightly parted threads.

The spire is short, and stumpily conical, subscalar. The apex is small, rounded, ending in the minute dome-shaped tip, which just rises into view in the middle. The first two whorls are microscopically striated spirally. There are 5 whorls in all, short and broad, with a barely convex conical outline. The body whorl is round and tumid, with a faintly concave conical base. The suture is nearly horizontal. It is itself indistinguishable at the bottom of a little narrow deep rounded nick-like trench.

The aperture is sub-oval, a little oblique to the axis and bluntly pointed above. The outer lip is patulous, with a thin-edged, remotely varixed lip. Its sweep is a very regular curve, and its front line level. The inner lip is not thick, but distinct on the body. On the columella it is narrow, sharp, and prominent, with a minute umbilical channel behind it.

== Distribution ==
This species is endemic to Australia and occurs off New South Wales, Northern Territory, Queensland, Victoria and Western Australia.
