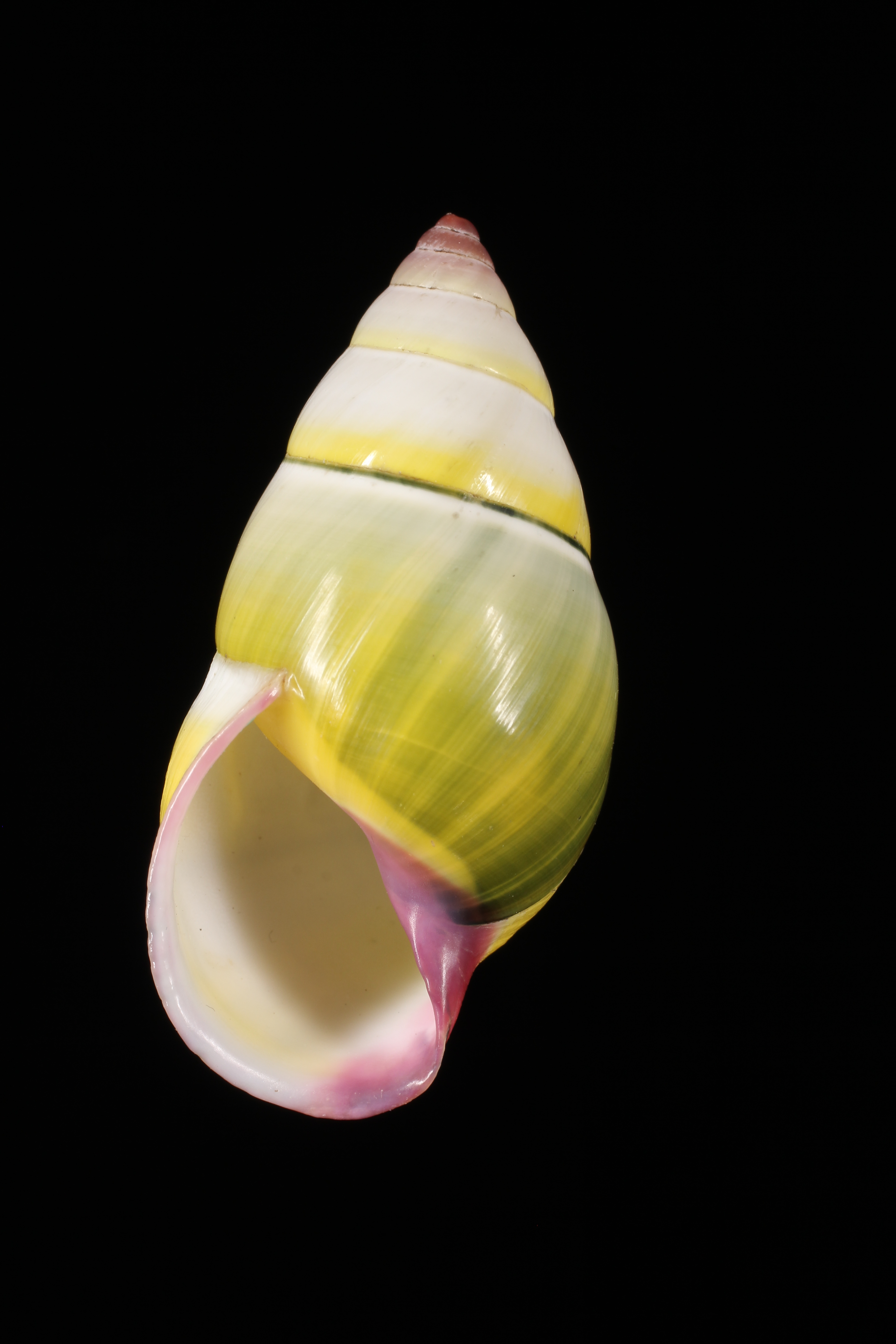
- Shell of Amphidromus madelineae (holotype at MNHN, Paris)

Scientific classification
- Domain: Eukaryota
- Kingdom: Animalia
- Phylum: Mollusca
- Class: Gastropoda
- Order: Stylommatophora
- Family: Camaenidae
- Genus: Amphidromus
- Species: A. madelineae

Binomial name
- Amphidromus madelineae Thach, 2020

= Amphidromus madelineae =

Species of tree snail

Amphidromus madelineae is a species of air-breathing tree snail, an arboreal gastropod mollusk in the family Camaenidae.

== Description ==
The length of this sinister shell varies between 27.7 mm and 39.7 mm, its diameter between 16.2 mm and 20.2 mm.

The shell ranges from small to medium in size. It exhibits a sinistral coiling, and presents an elongate to ovate conical shape that is rather thin and glossy. The spire appears conical. The apex is acute, tinted pink to purplish-pink, and lacks a black spot on its tip. Comprising five to six nearly smooth whorls, the shell displays a wide and shallow suture, and the body whorl is rounded to nearly globose. The periostracum is usually deciduous, sometimes showing yellowish-green radial streaks that appear more conspicuous on the body whorl and faded on earlier whorls. The body whorl features a thin, dark green subsutural band, and sometimes exhibits irregular greenish spiral blotched bands below the periphery; a varix is sometimes present. The parietal callus is thin and transparent. The aperture is ovate to elongate; the peristome is little thickened and expanded; the outer lip is generally whitish to purplish-pink. The inner side of the outer wall appears whitish around the columella with a purplish-pink hue. The columella is straight, thickened, and pale to dark purplish-pink. The umbilicus is imperforate.

The radula features teeth arranged in anteriorly pointed V-shaped rows. The central tooth is monocuspid and spatulate with a truncated cusp. The lateral teeth are bicuspid; the endocone appears small and slightly elongate, exhibiting a wide and deep notch, and a dull cusp; the ectocone is large with a slightly blunt to dull cusp. The lateral teeth gradually transform into asymmetric tricuspid marginal teeth. The outermost teeth possess a small and multicuspid structure.

The genital organs feature a relatively short atrium. The penis is stout, cylindrical, and short, measuring approximately half the length of the vagina. The penial retractor muscle appears thickened and short, inserting on the epiphallus close to the penis. The epiphallus is a stout tube and approximately as long as the vagina. The flagellum is short, extending from the epiphallus and terminating in a slightly curved tip; an appendix is absent. The vas deferens is a slender tube passing from the free oviduct and terminating at the epiphallus-flagellum junction. The internal wall of the penis is corrugated, exhibiting a prominent series of thickened and smooth-surfaced longitudinal penial pilasters that form a fringe around the penial wall. The penial verge is very short and has a smooth surface.

== Distribution ==
This species is endemic to Vietnam.
