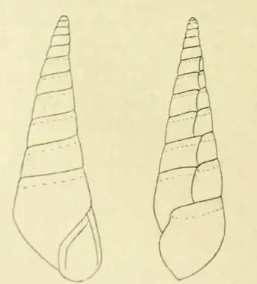
- Shell of Melanella letsonae (holotype)

Scientific classification
- Kingdom: Animalia
- Phylum: Mollusca
- Class: Gastropoda
- Subclass: Caenogastropoda
- Order: Littorinimorpha
- Family: Eulimidae
- Genus: Melanella
- Species: M. letsonae

Binomial name
- Melanella letsonae Pilsbry, 1917

= Melanella letsonae =

Species of gastropod

Melanella letsonae is a species of sea snail, a marine gastropod mollusk in the family Eulimidae. The species is one of multiple species known to exist within the genus, Melanella.

== Description ==
The length of the shell attains 4.5 mm, its diameter 1.6 mm.

(Original description) The shell is very slender and white, moderately curved to the right, and somewhat solid. There is a row of varix-lines on the right side, which become dorsal in the upper part of the spire. The shell contains 10 whorls. The whorls are nearly flat, the suture is superficial, and it has a broad gray border below. The body whorl is obtusely subangular above the middle, and the base is tapering and slightly convex. The aperture is small and ovate, and the outer lip curves forward very strongly in the middle.

== Distribution ==
This marine species occurs off Hawaii.
