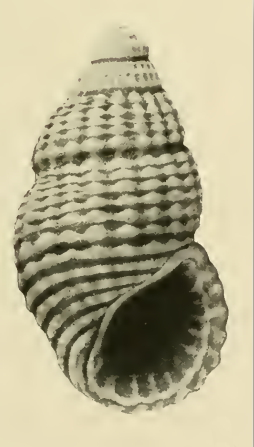
- Shell of Alvania trachisma (holotype)

Scientific classification
- Kingdom: Animalia
- Phylum: Mollusca
- Class: Gastropoda
- Subclass: Caenogastropoda
- Order: Littorinimorpha
- Superfamily: Rissooidea
- Family: Rissoidae
- Genus: Alvania
- Species: A. trachisma

Binomial name
- Alvania trachisma Bartsch, 1911

Synonyms
- Alvania californica Bartsch, 1911

= Alvania trachisma =

Species of gastropod

Alvania trachisma is a species of small sea snail, a marine gastropod mollusk or micromollusk in the family Rissoidae.

== Description ==
The length of the shell attains 3.3 mm, its diameter 1.9 mm.

(Original description) The elongate-ovate shell is yellowish white. (Protoconch decollated.) The whorls of the teleoconch are slightly rounded. They are marked by slender, well rounded, almost vertical, axial ribs, of which 26 occur upon the first and second and 22 upon the third and the penultimate whorl. These axial ribs are about one-third as wide as the spaces that separate them and extend prominently from the summit of the whorls, where they terminate in rounded cusps, to the umbilical area. In addition to the axial sculpture, the whorls are marked by spiral cords, of which 3 occur between the sutures on the first and second whorls, 5 on the third, and 6 on the penultimate whorl. The spiral cords pass over the axial ribs as cords. The spaces enclosed between the axial ribs and the spiral cords are elongate oval pits, having their long axes parallel with the spiral sculpture. The suture is broad and very deeply channeled. The periphery of the body whorl is marked by a sulcus a little wider than those occurring on the spire and are crossed by the continuations of the axial ribs. The base of the shell is moderately produced, slightly concave in the middle, marked by six equal and almost equally spaced spiral cords and the continuations of the axial ribs. The oval aperture is oblique and moderately large. The posterior angle is acute. The outer lip is very thick, re-enforced immediately behind the edge by a strong varix, showing about 10 internal lirations within the aperture. The inner lip is very stout, curved, and reflected over and appressed to base. The parietal wall is covered with a thick callus which completes the peristome.

== Distribution ==
This species occurs in the Pacific Ocean off California.
