= Clivipollia fragaria =

Scientific classification
- Kingdom: Animalia
- Phylum: Mollusca
- Class: Gastropoda
- Subclass: Caenogastropoda
- Order: Neogastropoda
- Family: Prodotiidae
- Genus: Clivipollia
- Species: C. fragaria

Binomial name
- Clivipollia fragaria (W. Wood, 1828)

Synonyms
- Cantharus fragaria (W. Wood, 1828); Engina carolinae (Kiener, 1840); Engina fragaria (W. Wood, 1828); Peristernia carolinae (Kiener, 1840) superseded combination; Peristernia fragaria (W. Wood, 1828); Pollia fragaria (W. Wood, 1828); Ricinula bella Reeve, 1846; Turbinella carolinae Kiener, 1840; Voluta fragaria W. Wood, 1828 (original combination)

Species of gastropod

Clivipollia fragaria is a species of sea snail, a marine gastropod mollusk in the family Prodotiidae.

== Description ==
The length of the shell attains 25.6 mm.

== Distribution ==
This species occurs in the Indian Ocean off Aldabra and Mozambique; also off the Philippines, the Maldives, and Micronesia.
