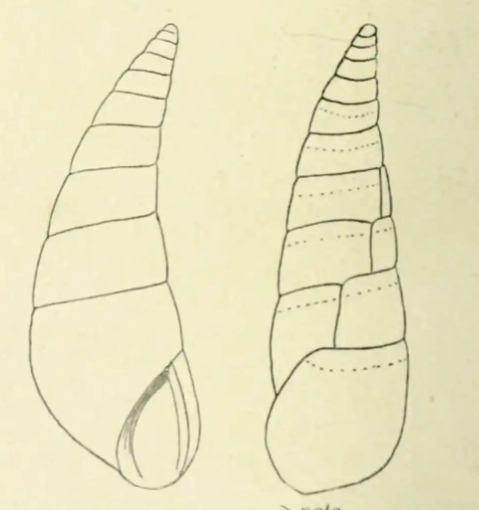
- Shell of Melanella lunata (original image)

Scientific classification
- Kingdom: Animalia
- Phylum: Mollusca
- Class: Gastropoda
- Subclass: Caenogastropoda
- Order: Littorinimorpha
- Family: Eulimidae
- Genus: Melanella
- Species: M. lunata

Binomial name
- Melanella lunata Pilsbry, 1918

= Melanella lunata =

Species of gastropod

Melanella lunata is a species of sea snail, a marine gastropod mollusk in the family Eulimidae. The species is one of many species known to exist within the genus, Melanella.

== Description ==
The length of the shell attains 6.6 mm, its diameter 2.3 mm.

(Original description) The shell is rather slender and somewhat solid, white in color, and very strongly curved to the right and a little backward above. There are 10 whorls remaining, the apex being imperfect.The whorls are nearly flat and marked with varix-lines on the right, which become dorsal above. The suture is superficial, distinctly but shortly descending to each varix-line and to the aperture, and it is broadly bordered below with gray. The aperture is small and ovate, and the outer lip is moderately arched forward in the middle.

== Distribution ==
This marine species occurs off Hawaii.
