= Alvania proavia =

Scientific classification
- Kingdom: Animalia
- Phylum: Mollusca
- Class: Gastropoda
- Subclass: Caenogastropoda
- Order: Littorinimorpha
- Superfamily: Rissooidea
- Family: Rissoidae
- Genus: Alvania
- Species: †A. proavia

Binomial name
- †Alvania proavia (Pilsbry & C. W. Johnson, 1917)

Synonyms
- † Rissoa (Alvania) proavita (subsequent incorrect spelling in Pilsbry, 1922: 384, 432); † Rissoa (Alvania) proavia Pilsbry & C. W. Johnson, 1917 (not a Rissoa)

Species of gastropod

Alvania proavia is an extinct species of minute sea snail, a marine gastropod mollusk or micromollusk in the family Rissoidae.

== Description ==
The length of the shell attains 1.35 mm, its diameter 0.9 mm.

(Original description) The shell is imperforate, rather plump has a conical shape. The shell contains 4 whorls. The first 2½ whorls are smooth, convex, and form a somewhat acuminate summit. The following whorls have a latticed sculpture of rather narrow vertical ribs, which pass over the periphery but are obsolete over most of the base, crossed by spiral cords a little narrower than the ribs, and forming small nodes at the intersections. On the penultimate whorl there are three spiral cords, the upper one at the shoulder. On the body whorl there are six spiral cords, the second from above forming the periphery, the lower two smooth, the others passing over ribs. Some very minute spiral striae are visible in the intercostal spaces. The aperture is nearly circular,. The outer lip is strengthened by a strong varix.

== Distribution ==
Fossils have been found in Oligocene strata in the Dominican Republic
