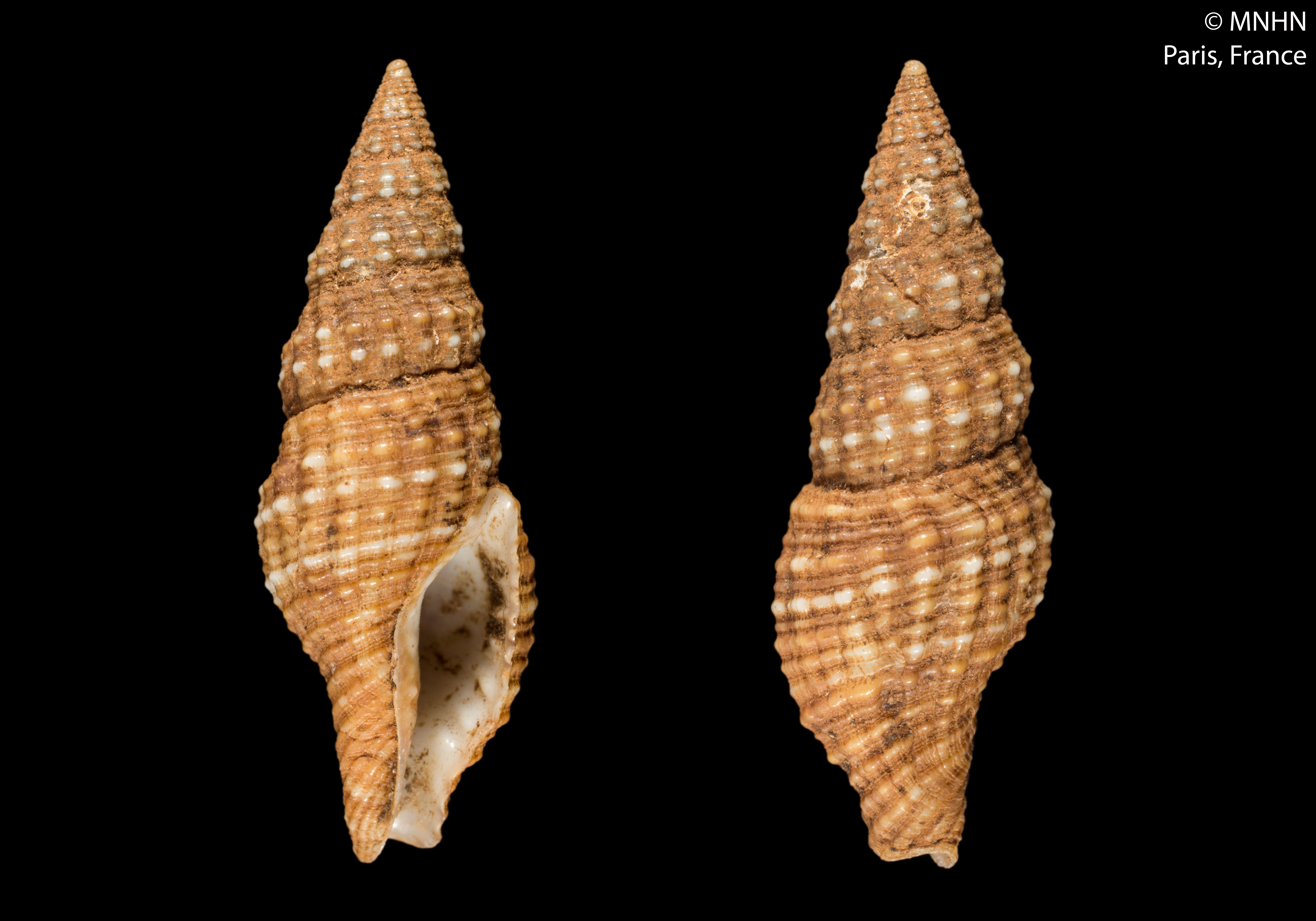
- Shell of Prodotia iostoma (syntype at MNHN, Paris)

Scientific classification
- Kingdom: Animalia
- Phylum: Mollusca
- Class: Gastropoda
- Subclass: Caenogastropoda
- Order: Neogastropoda
- Family: Prodotiidae
- Genus: Prodotia
- Species: P. iostoma

Binomial name
- Prodotia iostoma (Gray, 1834)

Synonyms
- Buccinum marmoratum Reeve, 1846 (non-Link, 1807); Cantharus iostoma (Gray, 1834); Cantharus iostomus [sic] (misspelling); Fusus (Pisania) desmoulinsi Montrouzier, 1864; Fusus desmoulinsi Montrouzier, 1864; Phos billeheusti Petit de la Saussaye, 1853; Pisania billeheusti (Petit de la Saussaye, 1853); Pollia marmorata (Reeve, 1846); Prodotia iostomus [sic]; Triton iostoma Gray, 1834 (original combination)

= Prodotia iostoma =

Species of gastropod

Prodotia iostoma is a species of sea snail, a marine gastropod mollusc in the family Prodotiidae.

== Distribution ==
This marine species occurs in the Indian Ocean off Aldabra and the Mascarenes; also off New Caledonia and New Zealand.
