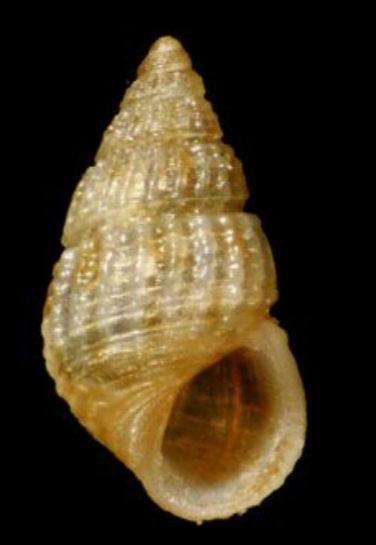
- Shell of Alvania ogasawarana (specimen at the Natural History Museum, Rotterdam)

Scientific classification
- Kingdom: Animalia
- Phylum: Mollusca
- Class: Gastropoda
- Subclass: Caenogastropoda
- Order: Littorinimorpha
- Superfamily: Rissooidea
- Family: Rissoidae
- Genus: Alvania
- Species: A. ogasawarana

Binomial name
- Alvania ogasawarana (Pilsbry, 1904)

Synonyms
- Rissoa ogasawarana Pilsbry, 1904 (basionym)

= Alvania ogasawarana =

Species of gastropod

Alvania ogasawarana is a species of small sea snail, a marine gastropod mollusk or micromollusk in the family Rissoidae.

== Description ==
The length of the shell attains 2.7 mm, its diameter 1.2 mm.

(Original description) The ovate shell has a rather short, straightly conic spire. It is cream-white, with some indistinct brown spots below the suture.

The sculpture consists of rather small close longitudinal riblets, which on the body whorl do not pass below the periphery. These are crossed by about 11 spiral cords on the body whorl. There are about 5 or 5½ slightly convex whorls, the last one with a broad rounded but rather low varix a short distance behind the thin outer lip. The aperture is ovate and entire below.

== Distribution ==
This species occurs off Japan and the Philippines.
