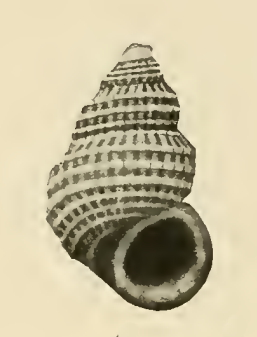
- Shell of Alvania oldroydae (holotype)

Scientific classification
- Kingdom: Animalia
- Phylum: Mollusca
- Class: Gastropoda
- Subclass: Caenogastropoda
- Order: Littorinimorpha
- Superfamily: Rissooidea
- Family: Rissoidae
- Genus: Alvania
- Species: A. oldroydae

Binomial name
- Alvania oldroydae Bartsch, 1911

= Alvania oldroydae =

Species of gastropod

Alvania oldroydae is a species of small sea snail, a marine gastropod mollusk or micromollusk in the family Rissoidae.

== Description ==
The length of the shell attains 1.6 mm (0.063 in), its diameter 1.05 mm (0.041 in).

(Original description) The minute, yellowish white shell is broadly ovate. The 1½ protoconch whorls are well rounded and smooth. The teleoconch whorls are inflated, weakly shouldered on the posterior fourth between the sutures. They are marked by numerous slender rather closely spaced well-rounded slightly protractive axial ribs, of which 20 occur upon the first, 24 upon the second, and 28 upon the penultimate whorl. In addition to the axial sculpture, the whorls are marked by slender spiral threads which are almost equal to the axial ribs. Of these threads, three occur upon the first and second whorl, dividing the space between the sutures into four almost equal portions, the space at the summit being a little wider than the rest The first spiral thread marks the termination of the sloping shoulder. On the penultimate whorl an additional spiral cord makes its appearance in the space immediately below the summit, a little nearer to the summit than the first spiral cord on the previous whorl. The intersections of the axial ribs and the spiral cords form slender rounded tubercles. The spaces inclosed between the three cords on the early whorls and the same on the last whorl are squarish pits, while the spaces between the summit and the first spiral cord and the axial ribs on the first two turns are rectangular pits, having their long axes parallel with the axial sculpture. On the body whorl an additional spiral cord renders the pits between this cord and the next spiral cord and the axial ribs also squarish. He suture is strongly constricted. The periphery of the body whorl is marked by a sulcus as wide as that separating the suprasutural cord from the one adjacent to it anteriorly. The base of the shell is well rounded, strongly umbilicated, marked by four equal and almost equally spaced spiral cords, which are as strong as those occurring between the sutures and the feeble continuations of the axial ribs. The aperture is subcircular. The outer lip is thickened all around by a very thick varix. The inner lip is stout, decidedly curved, somewhat reflected over and appressed to the base. The parietal wall is covered with a very thick callus, which renders the peritreme complete.

== Distribution ==
This species occurs in the Pacific Ocean off California.
