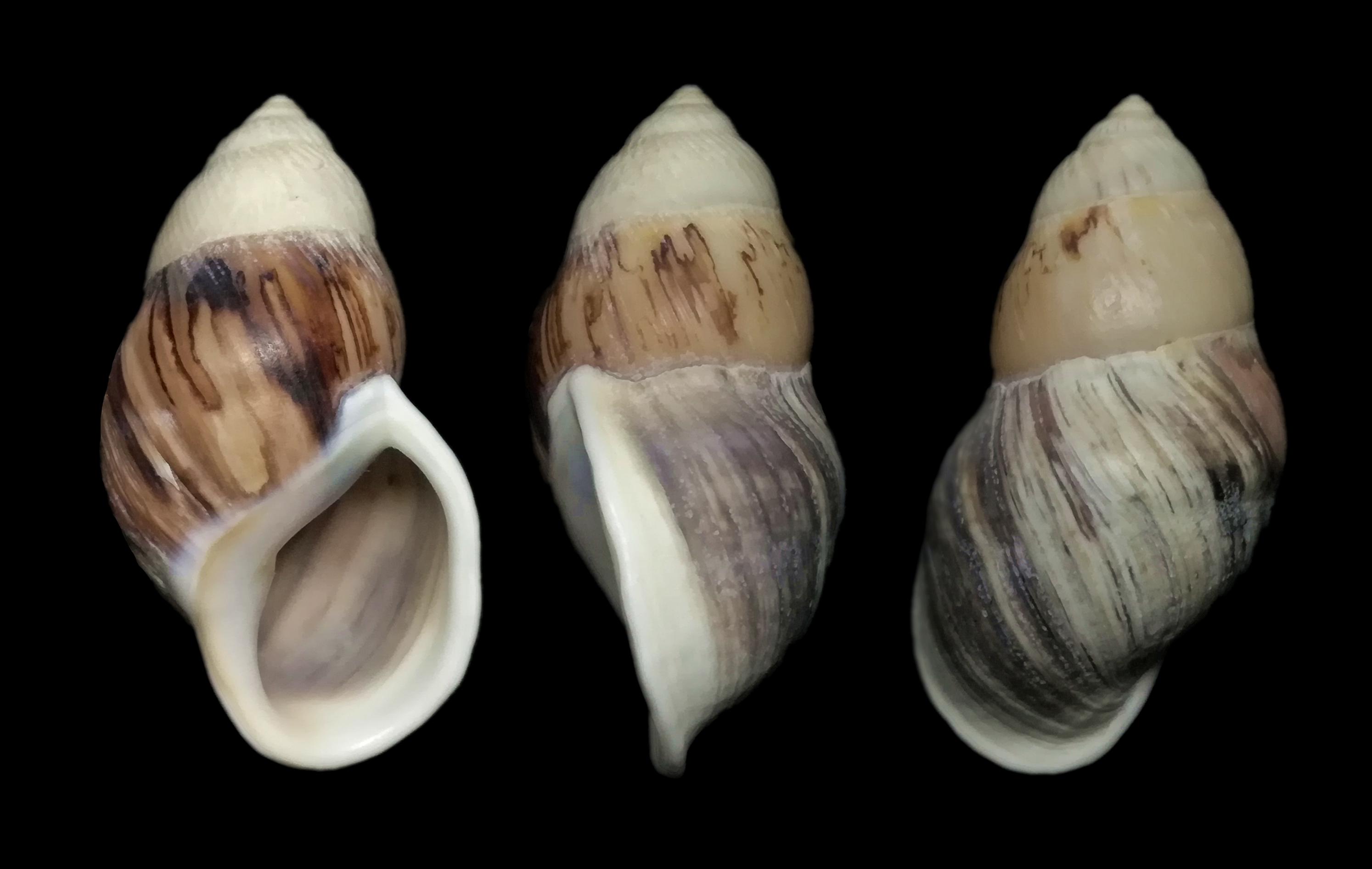

Scientific classification
- Kingdom: Animalia
- Phylum: Mollusca
- Class: Gastropoda
- Order: Stylommatophora
- Family: Camaenidae
- Genus: Amphidromus
- Species: A. costifer

Binomial name
- Amphidromus costifer Smith, 1893

Synonyms
- Amphidromus costifer costifer E. A. Smith, 1893; Amphidromus costifer gemmalimae Thach, 2020 junior subjective synonym; Amphidromus nguyenkhoai Thach, 2020 junior subjective synonym

= Amphidromus costifer =

Species of large-sized air-breathing tree snail

Amphidromus costifer is a species of large-sized air-breathing tree snail, an arboreal gastropod mollusk in the family Camaenidae.

Subspecies

- Amphidromus costifer costifer E. A. Smith, 1893: synonym of Amphidromus costifer E. A. Smith, 1893
- Amphidromus costifer gemmalimae Thach, 2020: : synonym of Amphidromus costifer E. A. Smith, 1893

== Description ==
The length of the shell attains 47 mm, its diameter 24 mm.

A large and thick Amphidromus species with strong growth lines. The holotype is 46.5 mm in height, and 29.0 mm in width.

(Original description in Latin) The shell presents a slit-like umbilicus. The whitish shell is ovate and dextral, and feels solid. Its surface exhibits more or less streaking or variegation with purplish-brown above the body whorl. It comprises six somewhat convex whorls, which are separated by a slightly oblique suture. The whorls show striations of growth lines (which are rugose on the body whorl) and are sculptured with obsolete spiral striae. The body whorl features a strong, very oblique white varix on its back. The aperture is broadly somewhat ear-shaped, reaching half of the total length, and is whitish internally. The peristome appears white and thickened, with the right margin slightly reflected and the columellar margin broadly dilated, merging above with the outer lip via a very broad, thick white callus. The columella is somewhat perpendicular and slightly twisted, while the spire is conoid with convex margins.

== Distribution ==
The type locality is Binh Dinh, Dak Lak, and Gia Lai provinces in Central Vietnam.
