= Bailya cidaris =

Scientific classification
- Kingdom: Animalia
- Phylum: Mollusca
- Class: Gastropoda
- Subclass: Caenogastropoda
- Order: Neogastropoda
- Family: Pisaniidae
- Genus: Bailya
- Species: B. cidaris

Binomial name
- Bailya cidaris Watters, 2013

Synonyms
- Bailya (Bailya) cidaris Watters, 2013 · alternative representation

Species of gastropod

Bailya cidaris is a species of sea snail, a marine gastropod mollusc in the family Pisaniidae,.

== Distribution ==
This marine species occurs in the eastern Pacific off Panama.
