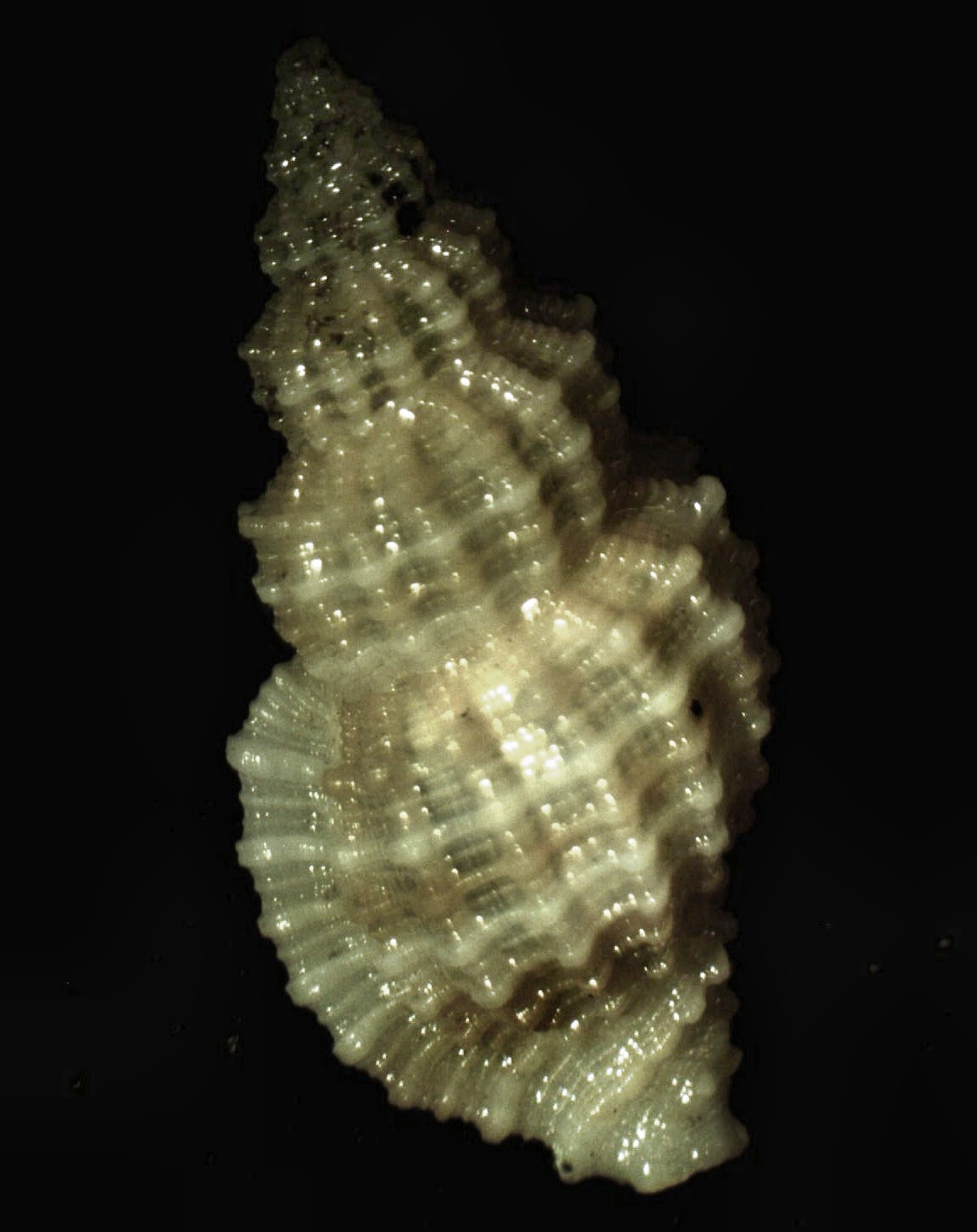
- Bailya parva

Scientific classification
- Kingdom: Animalia
- Phylum: Mollusca
- Class: Gastropoda
- Subclass: Caenogastropoda
- Order: Neogastropoda
- Superfamily: Buccinoidea
- Family: Pisaniidae
- Genus: Bailya; M. Smith, 1944

Type species
- Triton anomalus Hinds, 1844

Synonyms
- Bailya (Bailya) M. Smith, 1944· accepted, alternate representation

= Bailya =

Genus of gastropods

Bailya is a genus of sea snails, marine gastropod mollusks in the family Pisaniidae.

== Species ==
Species within the genus Bailya include:

- Bailya anomala (Hinds, 1844)
- Bailya cidaris Watters, 2013
- † Bailya crossata Woodring, 1973
- Bailya fabiani Espinosa & Ortea, 2022
- Bailya intricata (Dall, 1884)
- Bailya morgani Watters, 2009
- Bailya negrilana Bozzetti, 2018
- Bailya parva (C. B. Adams, 1850)
- Bailya sanctorum Watters, 2009
- Bailya weberi (Watters, 1983):

Species brought into synonymy

- Bailya amayae Espinosa, Fernández-Garcés & Soto Vázquez, 2021 (unaccepted > interim unpublished, no ZooBank registration in online-only publication)
- Bailya cubana Espinosa, Fernández-Garcés & Soto Vázquez, 2021 (unaccepted > interim unpublished, no ZooBank registration in online-only publication)
- Bailya dionae Espinosa, Fernández-Garcés & Soto Vázquez, 2021 (unaccepted > interim unpublished, no ZooBank registration in online-only publication)
- Bailya guanarocae Espinosa, Fernández-Garcés & Soto Vázquez, 2021 (unaccepted > interim unpublished, no ZooBank registration in online-only publication)
- Bailya marijkae De Jong & Coomans, 1988: synonym of Ameranna milleri (Nowell-Usticke, 1959)
- Bailya milleri Nowell-Usticke, 1959: synonym of Ameranna milleri (Nowell-Usticke, 1959)
- Bailya rangeli Espinosa, Fernández-Garcés & Soto Vázquez, 2021 (unaccepted > interim unpublished, no ZooBank registration in online-only publication)
