= Bailya sanctorum =

Scientific classification
- Kingdom: Animalia
- Phylum: Mollusca
- Class: Gastropoda
- Subclass: Caenogastropoda
- Order: Neogastropoda
- Family: Pisaniidae
- Genus: Bailya
- Species: B. sanctorum

Binomial name
- Bailya sanctorum Watters, 2009

Synonyms
- Bailya (Parabailya) sanctorum Watters, 2009

Species of gastropod

Bailya sanctorum is a species of sea snail, a marine gastropod mollusc in the family Pisaniidae.

== Description ==
The length of the shell attains 9.5 mm, its diameter is 4.5 mm.

== Distribution ==
This marine species occurs in the Caribbean Sea off the British Virgin Islands.
