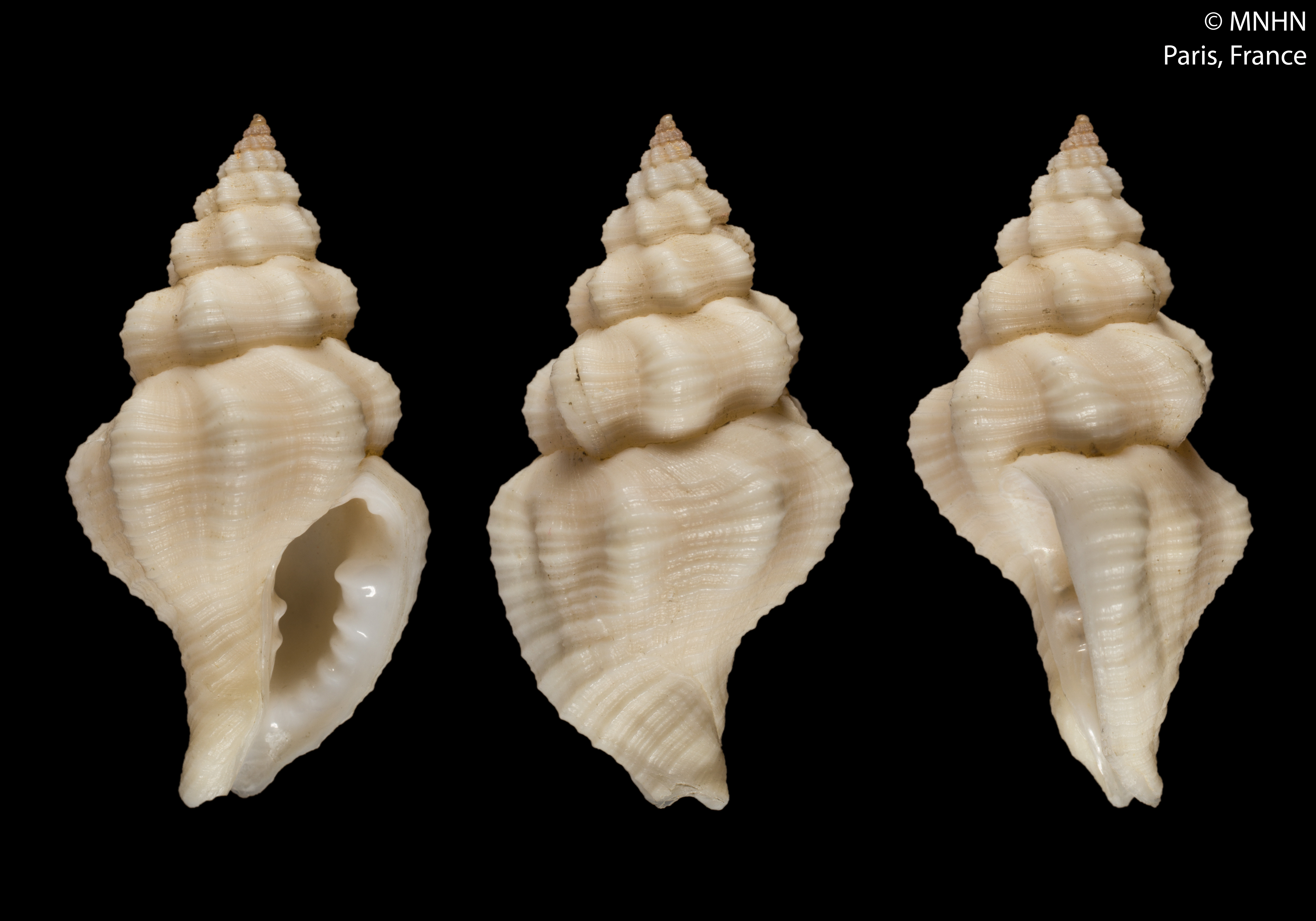
- Shell of Falsilatirus suduirauti (holotype at MNHN, Paris)

Scientific classification
- Kingdom: Animalia
- Phylum: Mollusca
- Class: Gastropoda
- Subclass: Caenogastropoda
- Order: Neogastropoda
- Superfamily: Buccinoidea
- Family: Prodotiidae
- Genus: Falsilatirus; Emerson & Moffitt, 1988

Type species
- Falsilatirus pacificus Emerson & Moffitt, 1988

= Falsilatirus =

Genus of gastropods

Falsilatirus is a genus of sea snails, marine gastropod mollusks in the family Prodotiidae.

== Species ==
Species within the genus Falsilatirus include:

- Falsilatirus pacificus Emerson & Moffitt, 1988
- Falsilatirus suduirauti Bozzetti, 1995
