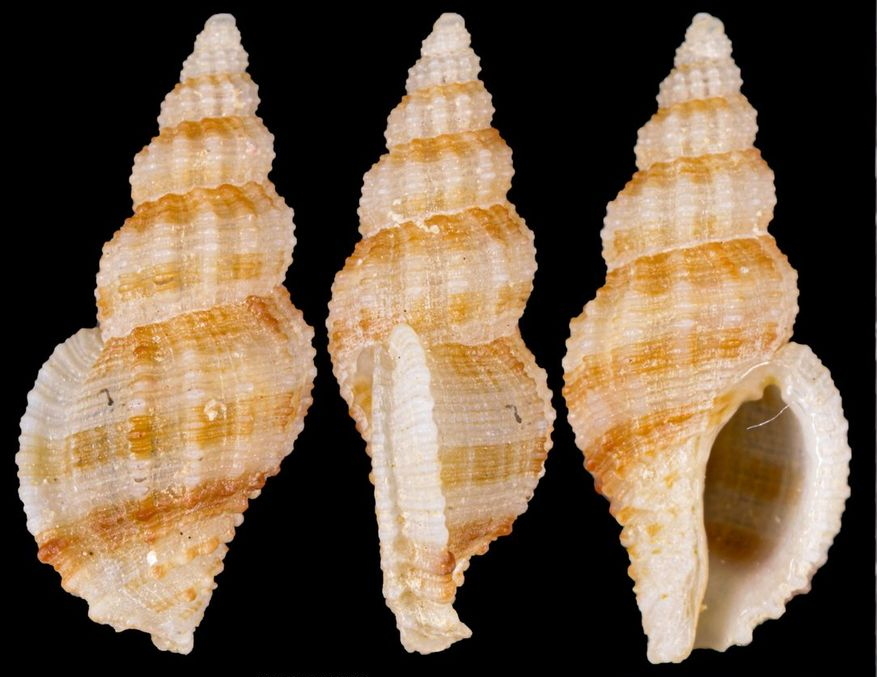
- Shell of Bailya morgani (paratype)

Scientific classification
- Kingdom: Animalia
- Phylum: Mollusca
- Class: Gastropoda
- Subclass: Caenogastropoda
- Order: Neogastropoda
- Family: Pisaniidae
- Genus: Bailya
- Species: B. morgani

Binomial name
- Bailya morgani Watters, 2009

Synonyms
- Bailya (Parabailya) morgani Watters, 2009

= Bailya morgani =

Species of gastropod

Bailya morgani is a species of sea snail, a marine gastropod mollusc in the family Pisaniidae.

== Description ==
The length of the shell attains 14 mm, its diameter 5.9 mm.

== Distribution ==
This marine species occurs in the Caribbean Sea off Honduras and Colombia.
