= Bailya fabiani =

Scientific classification
- Kingdom: Animalia
- Phylum: Mollusca
- Class: Gastropoda
- Subclass: Caenogastropoda
- Order: Neogastropoda
- Family: Pisaniidae
- Genus: Bailya
- Species: B. fabiani

Binomial name
- Bailya fabiani Espinosa & Ortea, 2022

Species of gastropod

Bailya fabiani is a species of sea snail, a marine gastropod mollusc in the family Pisaniidae.

== Distribution ==
This species occurs off Cuba.
