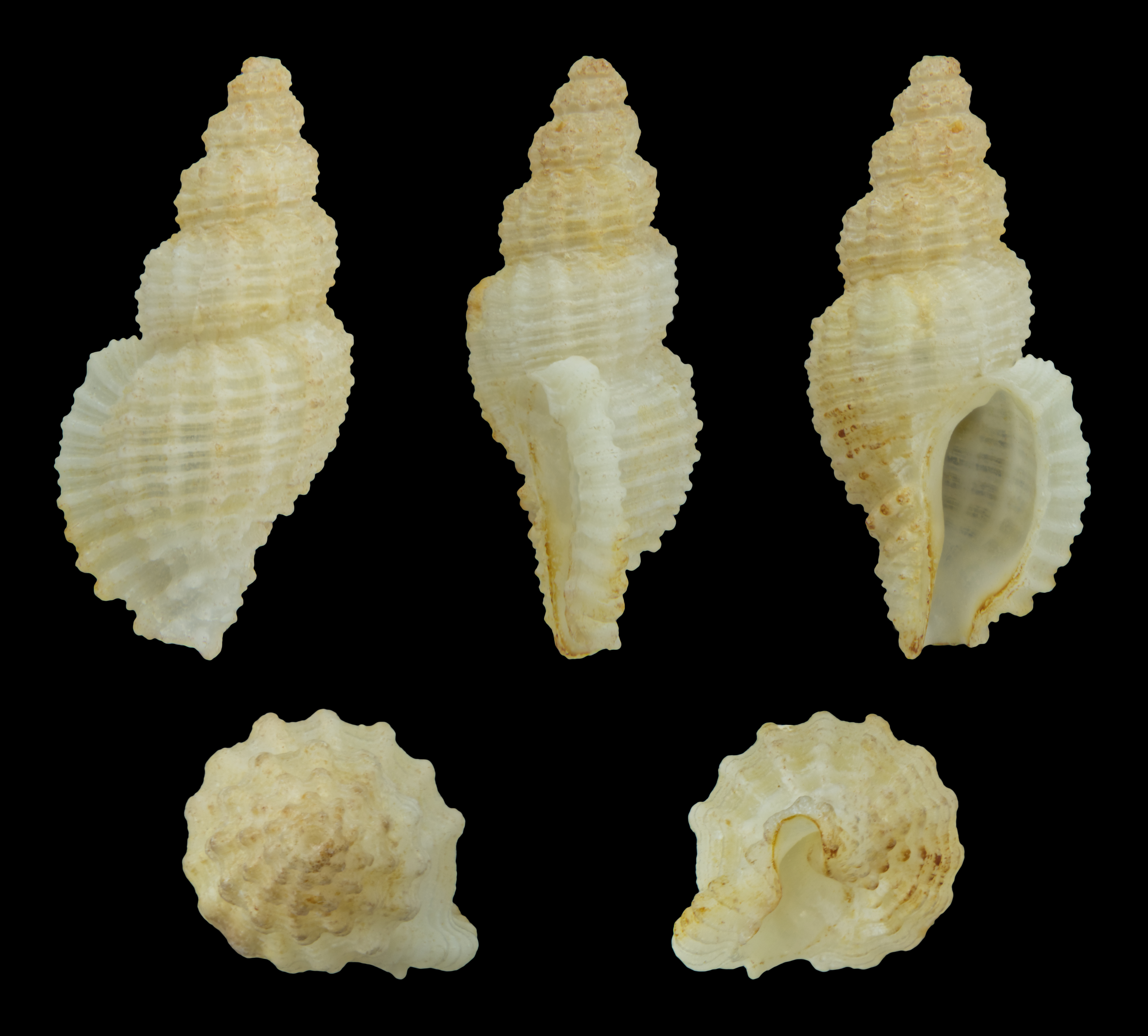

Scientific classification
- Kingdom: Animalia
- Phylum: Mollusca
- Class: Gastropoda
- Subclass: Caenogastropoda
- Order: Neogastropoda
- Family: Pisaniidae
- Genus: Bailya
- Species: B. parva

Binomial name
- Bailya parva (C. B. Adams, 1850)

Synonyms
- Bailya (Bailya) parva (C. B. Adams, 1850) alternative representation; Triton parvus C. B. Adams, 1850 (original combination)

= Bailya parva =

Species of gastropod

Bailya parva is a species of sea snail, a marine gastropod mollusc in the family Pisaniidae.

== Description ==
Shell size 20mm. Sculpture presents 10–12 axial ribs crossed by spiral lines, with beads forming at the intersections. The shell color is yellowish- to mahogany-brown, with broad white bands.

(Original description) The shell is elongated and subfusiform, with a dingy white spire marked by irregular pale brown stains. The body whorl is pale brown with two revolving whitish stripes, the upper one being linear. Occasionally, the shell is entirely brown except for the lower band.

It features narrow, rounded longitudinal ribs, numbering 10 to 12 on each whorl, including varices that are not easily distinguished from the ribs and are spaced slightly more than half a revolution apart. The surface is covered with numerous unequal, elevated spiral lines that continue over the ribs, with the anterior ones being larger and granose. The apex is acute, and the spire has slightly convex outlines. There are seven convex whorls, slightly more inflated above the middle, with a well-impressed suture. The aperture is subelliptical, with a small, well-defined posterior notch. The outer lip is crenulated within, while the inner lip is slightly thickened. The siphonal canal is short, wide, and slightly recurved, with a faint umbilical indentation.

== Distribution ==
Found under rocks at 5-10 feet depth, Berry Islands, Bahamas. Also off Florida, Gulf of Mexico, and the Caribbean Sea.
