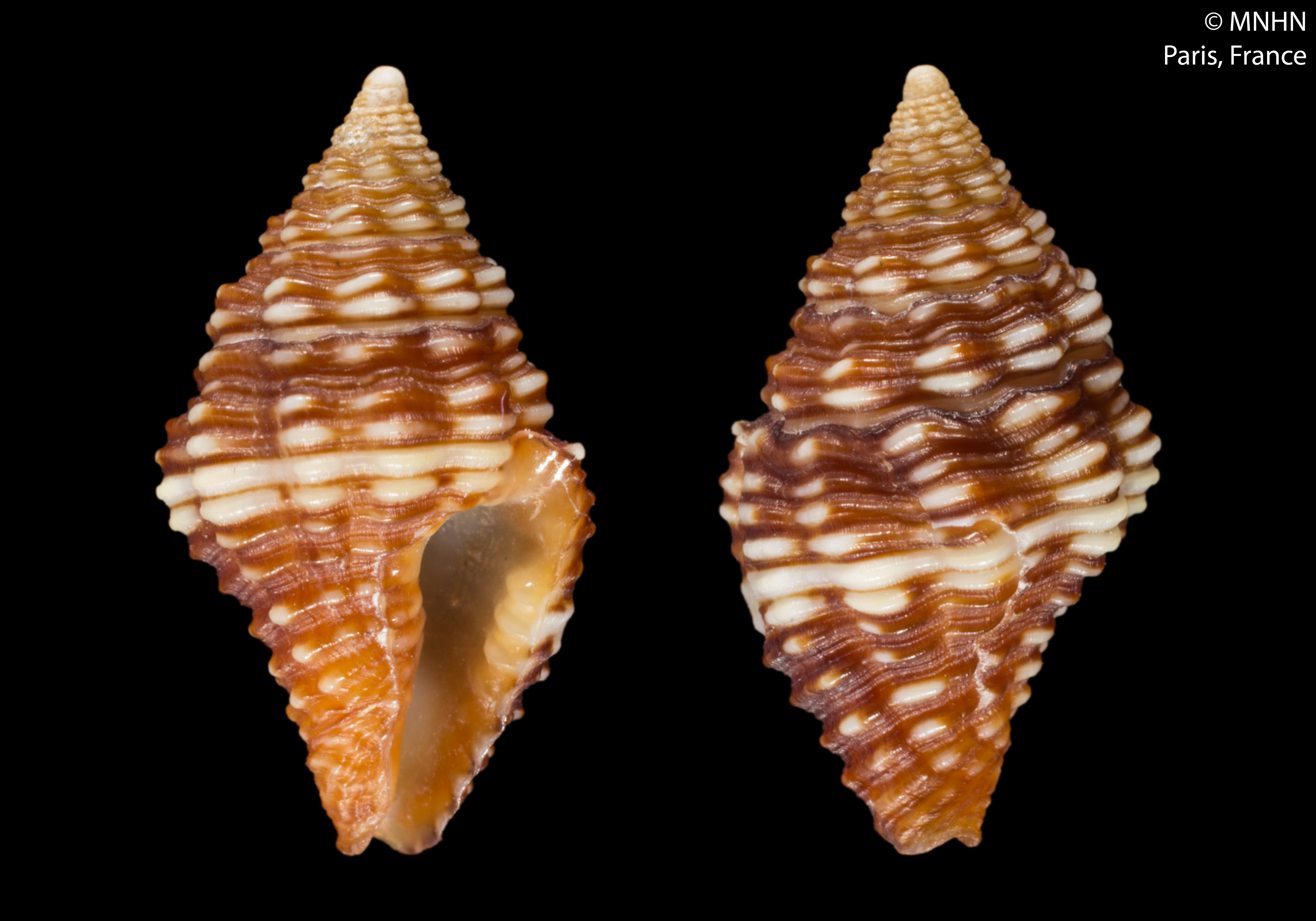
- Shell of Speccapollia africana (holotype at MNHN, Paris)

Scientific classification
- Kingdom: Animalia
- Phylum: Mollusca
- Class: Gastropoda
- Subclass: Caenogastropoda
- Order: Neogastropoda
- Superfamily: Buccinoidea
- Family: Prodotiidae
- Genus: Speccapollia; Fraussen & Stahlschmidt, 2016

Type species
- Ricinula recurva Reeve, 1846

= Speccapollia =

Genus of gastropods

Speccapollia is a genus of sea snails, marine gastropod mollusks in the family Prodotiidae.

== Species ==
- Speccapollia africana Fraussen & Stahlschmidt, 2016
- Speccapollia recurva (Reeve, 1846)
- Speccapollia tokiae (Chino & Fraussen, 2015)
