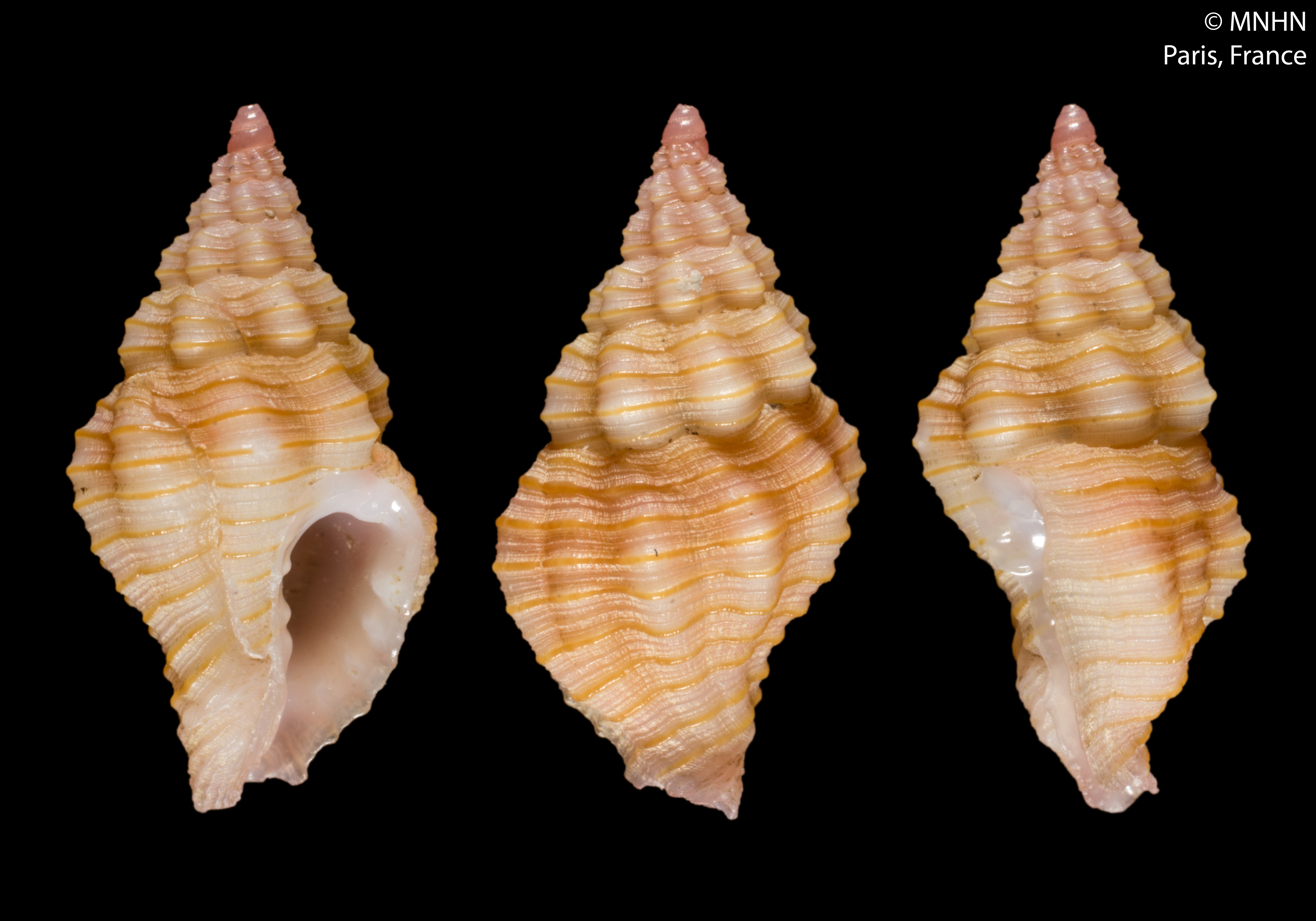
- Shell of Clivipollia delicata (holotype at MNHN, Paris)

Scientific classification
- Kingdom: Animalia
- Phylum: Mollusca
- Class: Gastropoda
- Subclass: Caenogastropoda
- Order: Neogastropoda
- Superfamily: Buccinoidea
- Family: Prodotiidae
- Genus: Clivipollia; Iredale, 1929

Type species
- Clivipollia imperita Iredale, 1929

= Clivipollia =

Genus of gastropods

Clivipollia is a genus of sea snails, marine gastropod mollusks in the family Prodotiidae.

== Species ==
Species within the genus Clivipollia include :

- Clivipollia costata (Pease, 1860)
- Clivipollia delicata Fraussen & Stahlschmidt, 2016
- Clivipollia fragaria (Wood, 1828)
- † Clivipollia gigas (Landau & Vermeij, 2012)
- Clivipollia incarnata (Deshayes, 1834)
- Clivipollia pulchra (Reeve, 1846)

Species brought into synonymy

- Clivipollia contracta (Reeve, 1846): synonym of Enzinopsis contracta (Reeve, 1846)
- Clivipollia imperita Iredale, 1929: synonym of Clivipollia pulchra (Reeve, 1846)
- Clivipollia recurva (Reeve, 1846): synonym of Speccapollia recurva (Reeve, 1846)
- Clivipollia thaanumi (Pilsbry & Brian, 1918): synonym of Clivipollia costata (Pease, 1860)
- Clivipollia tokiae Chino & Fraussen, 2015: synonym of Speccapollia tokiae (Chino & Fraussen, 2015) (original combination)
