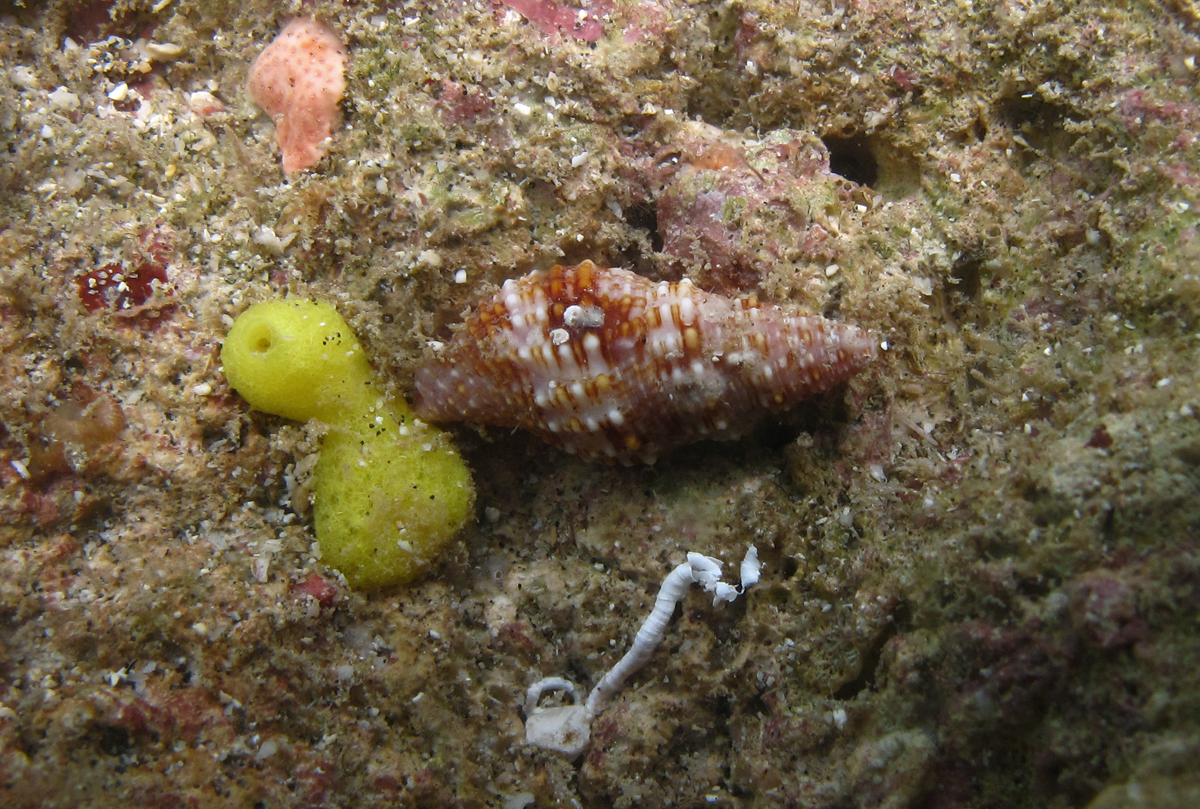
- Shell of Procardium iostoma

Scientific classification
- Kingdom: Animalia
- Phylum: Mollusca
- Class: Gastropoda
- Subclass: Caenogastropoda
- Order: Neogastropoda
- Superfamily: Buccinoidea
- Family: Prodotiidae
- Genus: Prodotia; Dall, 1924

Type species
- Phos billeheusti Petit de la Saussaye, 1853

Synonyms
- Cantharus (Prodotia) Dall, 1924

= Prodotia =

Genus of gastropods

Prodotia is a genus of sea snails, marine gastropod molluscs in the family Prodotiidae.

== Species ==
Species within the genus Prodotia include:

- Prodotia castanea (Melvill, 1912)
- Prodotia crocata (Reeve, 1846)
- Prodotia iostoma (Gray, 1834)
- Prodotia lannumi (Schwengel, 1950)
- Prodotia townsendi (Melvill, 1918)

Species brought into synonymy

- Prodotia iostomus [sic] accepted as Prodotia iostoma (Gray, 1834)
- Prodotia naevosa (Martens, 1880): synonym of Sinetectula naevosa (E. von Martens, 1880) (new combination)
- Prodotia shepstonensis (Tomlin, 1926): synonym of Sinetectula shepstonensis (Tomlin, 1926) (new combination)
