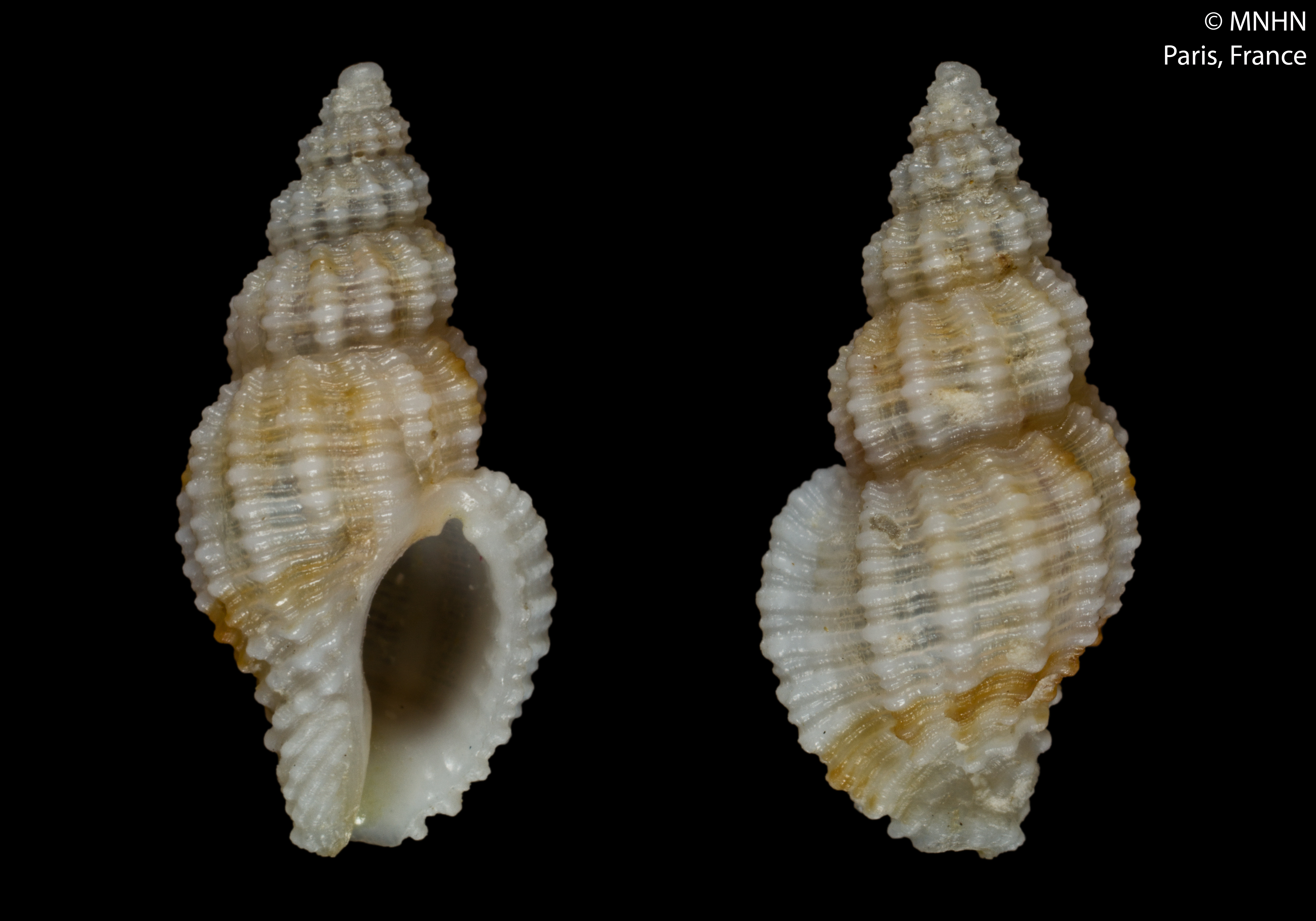
- Shell of Bailya negrilana (holotype in MNHN, Paris)

Scientific classification
- Kingdom: Animalia
- Phylum: Mollusca
- Class: Gastropoda
- Subclass: Caenogastropoda
- Order: Neogastropoda
- Family: Pisaniidae
- Genus: Bailya
- Species: B. negrilana

Binomial name
- Bailya negrilana Bozzetti, 2018

= Bailya negrilana =

Species of gastropod

Bailya negrilana is a species of sea snail, a marine gastropod mollusc in the family Pisaniidae.

== Distribution ==
This species occurs off Jamaica.
