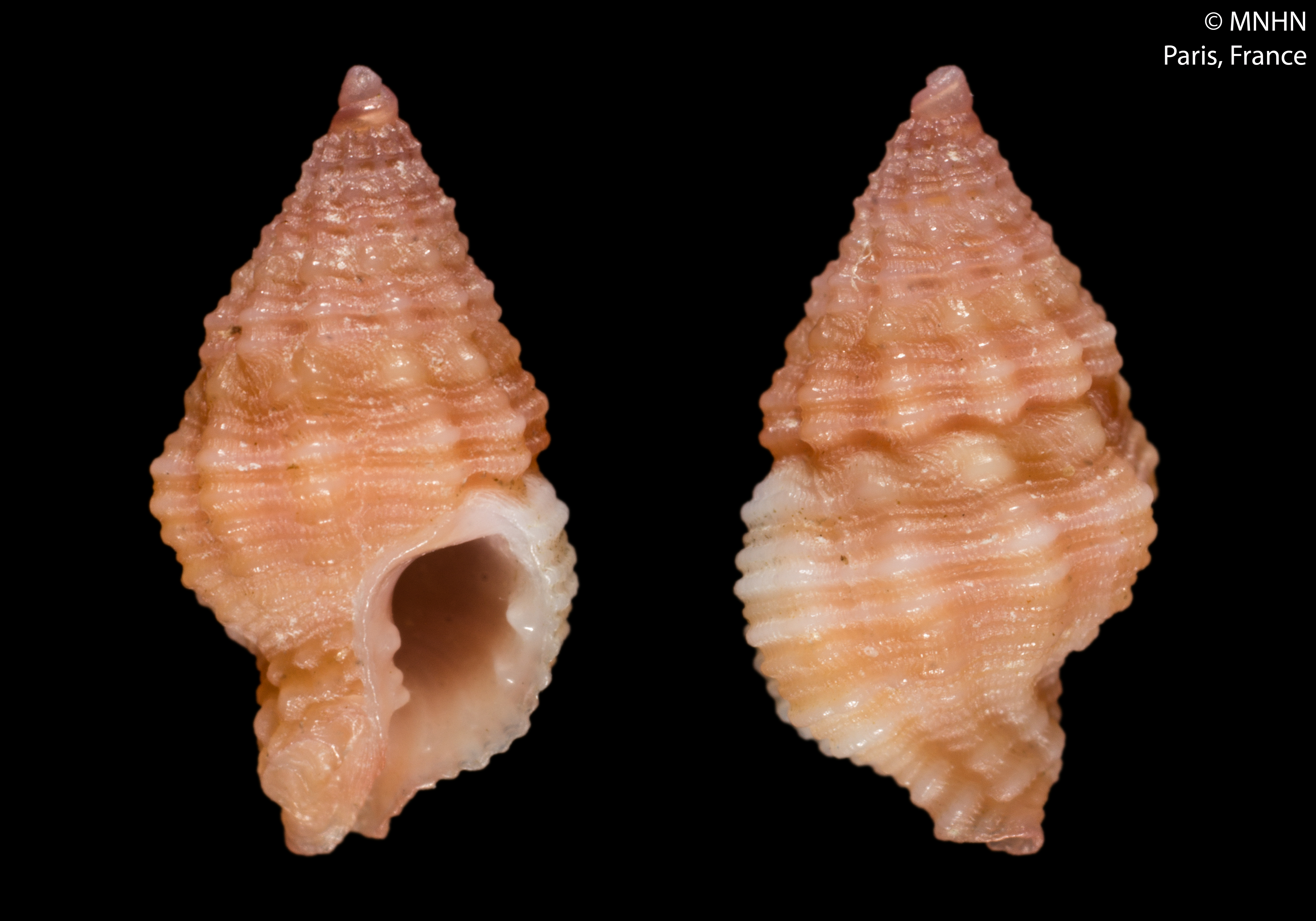
- Shell of Minioniella heleneae (holotype at MNHN, Paris)

Scientific classification
- Kingdom: Animalia
- Phylum: Mollusca
- Class: Gastropoda
- Subclass: Caenogastropoda
- Order: Neogastropoda
- Superfamily: Buccinoidea
- Family: Prodotiidae
- Genus: Minioniella; Fraussen & Stahlschmidt, 2016

Type species
- Minioniella heleneae Fraussen & Stahlschmidt, 2016

= Minioniella =

Genus of gastropods

Minioniella is a genus of sea snails, marine gastropod mollusks in the family Prodotiidae.

== Species ==
- Minioniella heleneae Fraussen & Stahlschmidt, 2016
