= Bailya weberi =

Scientific classification
- Kingdom: Animalia
- Phylum: Mollusca
- Class: Gastropoda
- Subclass: Caenogastropoda
- Order: Neogastropoda
- Family: Pisaniidae
- Genus: Bailya
- Species: B. weberi

Binomial name
- Bailya weberi (Watters, 1983)

Synonyms
- Bailya (Parabailya) weberi (Watters, 1983); Caducifer (Monostolium) weberi Watters, 1983 (basionym); Caducifer weberi Watters, 1983 (original combination); Monostolium weberi (Watters, 1983)

Species of gastropod

Bailya weberi is a species of sea snail, a marine gastropod mollusc in the family Pisaniidae.

== Distribution ==
This species occurs in the Caribbean Sea off Cuba and the Florida Keys.
