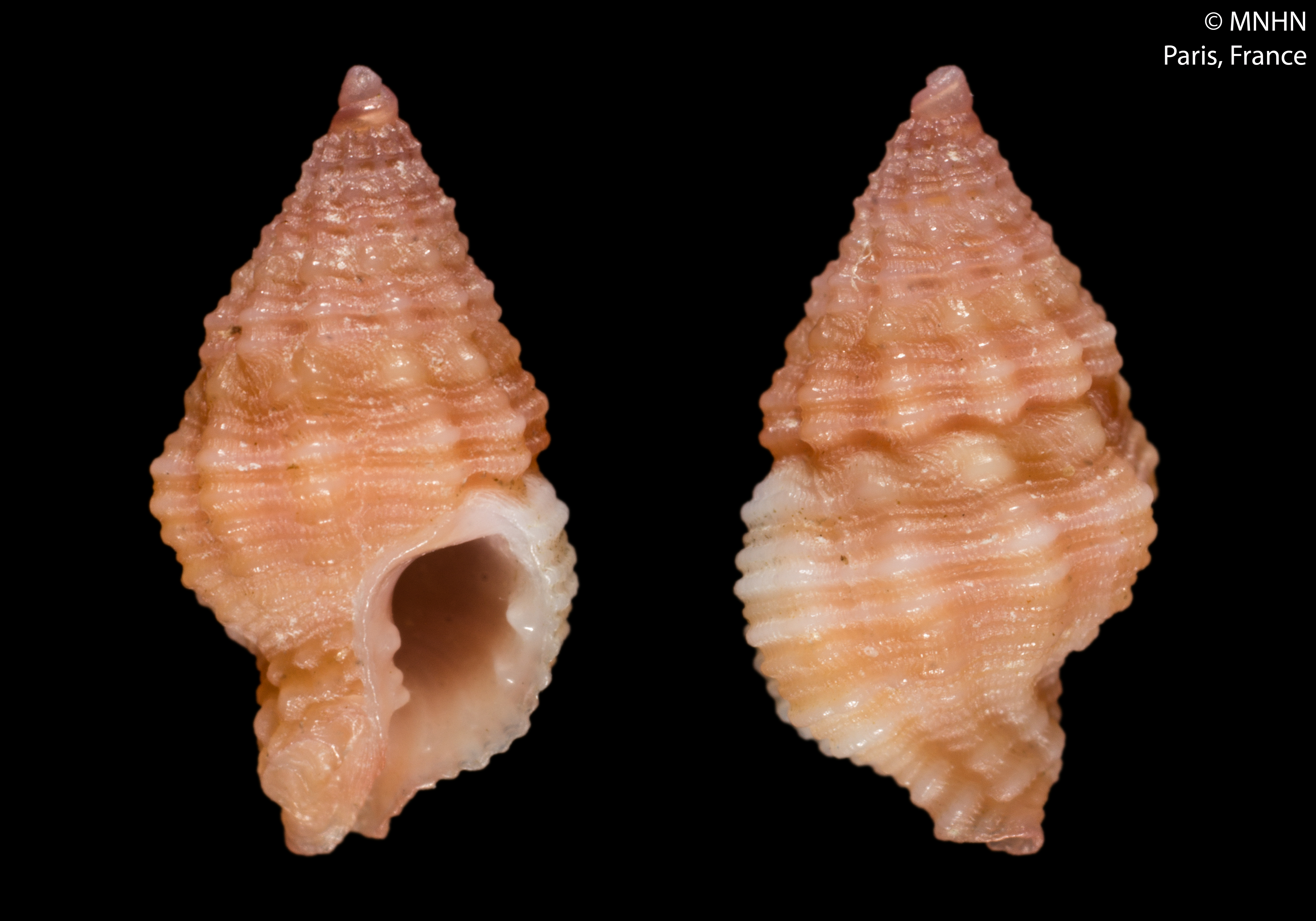
- Shell of Minioniella heleneae (holotype at MNHN, Paris)

Scientific classification
- Kingdom: Animalia
- Phylum: Mollusca
- Class: Gastropoda
- Subclass: Caenogastropoda
- Order: Neogastropoda
- Superfamily: Buccinoidea
- Family: Prodotiidae; Kantor, Fedosov, Kosyan, Puillandre, Sorokin, Kano, R. Clark & Bouchet, 2021

Genera
- See text

= Prodotiidae =

Family of sea snails

The Prodotiidae are a taxonomic family of sea snails, often known as whelks.

== Genera ==
- Caducifer Dall, 1904
- Clivipollia Iredale, 1929
- Enzinopsis Iredale, 1940
- Falsilatirus Emerson & Moffitt, 1988
- Minioniella Fraussen & Stahlschmidt, 2016
- Prodotia Dall, 1924
- Speccapollia Fraussen & Stahlschmidt, 2016
