= Varix (mollusc) =

Thickened axial ridge on the shell of a gastropod

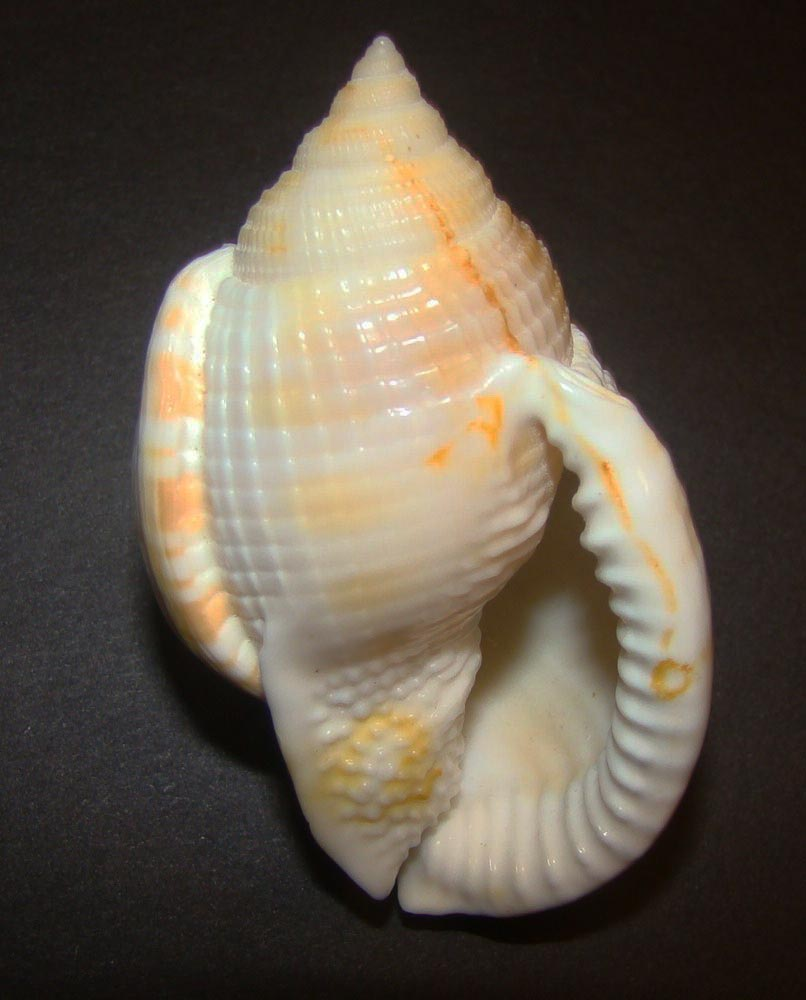
One simple varix (left) on the shell of Semicassis granulata in the Tonnidae

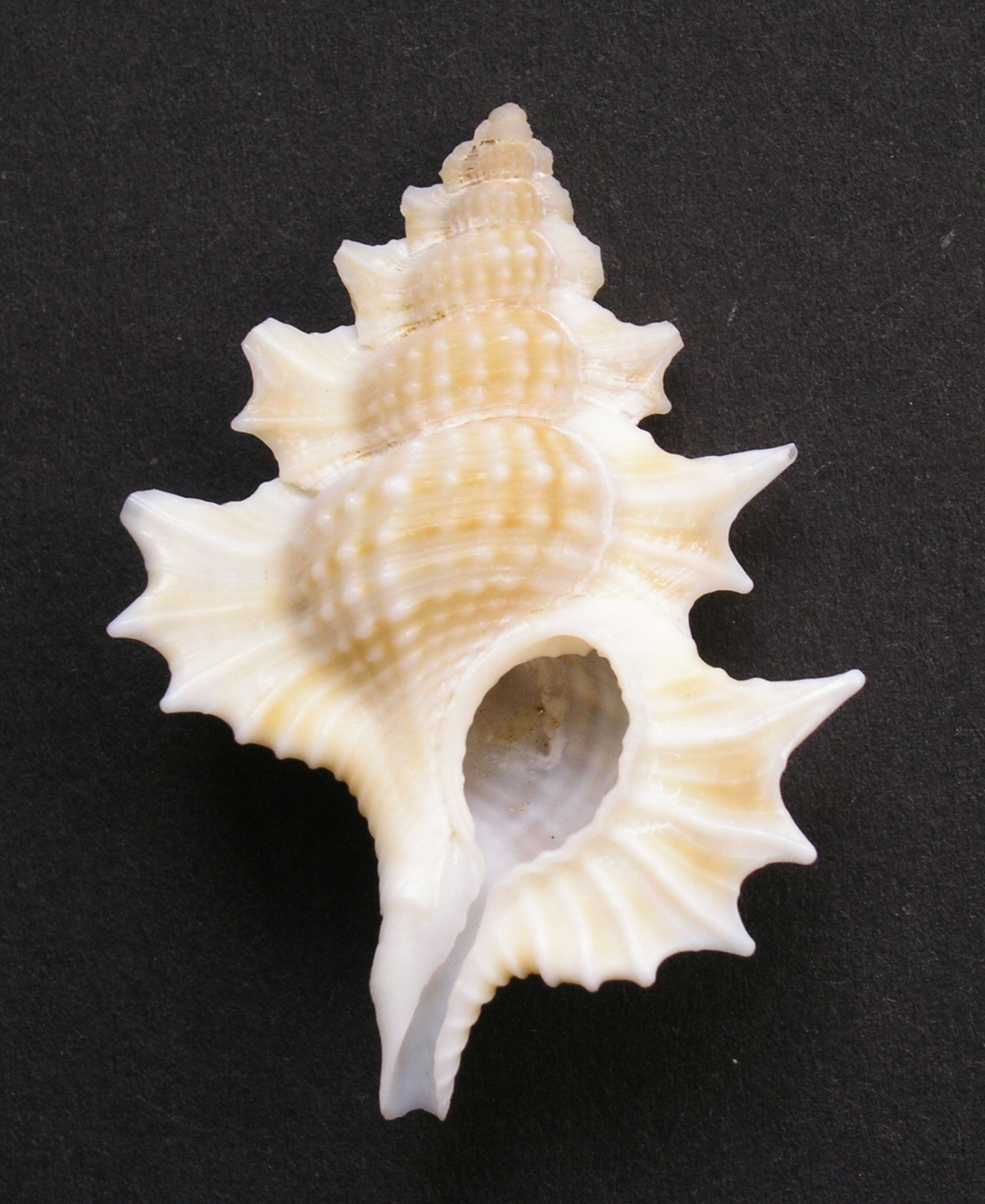
Symmetrical varices on the shell of a Biplex species, Ranellidae

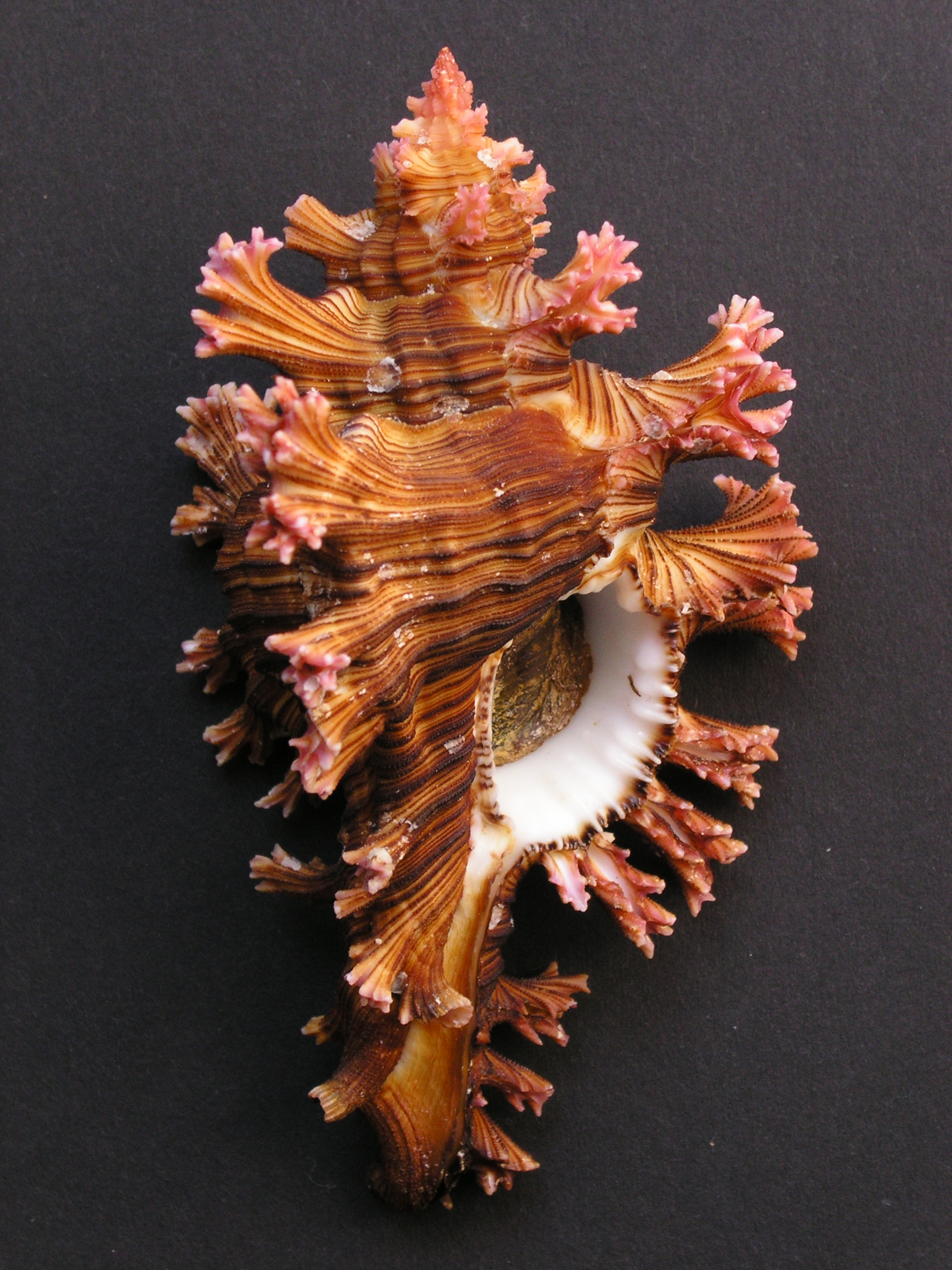
Elaborate frilled varices on the shell of Chicoreus palmarosae, Muricidae

A varix (pl.: varices) is an anatomical feature of the shell of certain sea snails, marine gastropod molluscs. Gastropods whose shells have varices are primarily families and species within the taxonomic groups Littorinimorpha and Neogastropoda.

The varix is a thickened axial ridge, a subcylindrical protrusion, in the shell which exists in some families of marine gastropods. It is an important shell character in generic classification. A varix is located at intervals around the whorl, and is formed by considerable thickening of the outer lip during a resting stage in the growth of the shell. In other words, in gastropods whose shells have varices, the shells are characterised by episodic growth - the shell grows in spurts, and during the resting phase the varix forms.

In many gastropod whose shells have varices, for example the Cassinae, the varix is essentially merely a thickening and swelling of the shell at that point. But in some genera within the family Muricidae, such as Chicoreus, Hexaplex, Pteropurpura and Pterynotus, and also within the genus Biplex, of the family Ranellidae, the varices are characterised by elaborate ruffles, frills or lamellae. Some other genera, for example Murex, are armed with protective spines which may be straight or curved, and which are formed by the varices closing or curling around their axis.
