= Anna (gastropod) =

Scientific classification
- Kingdom: Animalia
- Phylum: Mollusca
- Class: Gastropoda
- Subclass: Caenogastropoda
- Order: Neogastropoda
- Family: Pisaniidae
- Genus: †Anna; Risso, 1826

Type species
- † Anna massena Risso, 1826

Genus of gastropods

Anna is a genus of sea snails, marine gastropod molluscs in the family Pisaniidae.

== Species ==
According to the World Register of Marine Species (WoRMS), the following species is included within the genus Anna

- † Anna massena Risso, 1826 (nomen dubium)

Species brought into synonymy

- Anna assimilis (Reeve, 1846): synonym of Aplus assimilis (Reeve, 1846)
- Anna capixaba Coltro & Dornellas, 2013: synonym of Ameranna capixaba (Coltro & Dornellas, 2013)
- Anna dorbignyi (Payraudeau, 1826): synonym of Aplus dorbignyi (Payraudeau, 1826)
- Anna florida Garcia, 2008: synonym of Ameranna florida (Garcia, 2008)
- Anna goncalvesi (Coltro, 2005): synonym of Engina goncalvesi Coltro, 2005
- Anna marijkae (De Jong & Coomans, 1988): synonym of Ameranna milleri (Nowell-Usticke, 1959)
- Anna milleri (Nowell- Usticke, 1959): synonym of Ameranna milleri (Nowell-Usticke, 1959)
- Anna royalensis Watters, 2009: synonym of Ameranna royalensis (Watters, 2009)
- Anna scabra (Locard, 1886): synonym of Aplus scaber (Locard, 1891)
- Anna willemsae (De Jong & Coomans, 1988): synonym of Ameranna willemsae (De Jong & Coomans, 1988)
