= Bumble bee snail =

Bumble bee snail may refer to:

- Engina trifasciata
- Engina mendicaria
