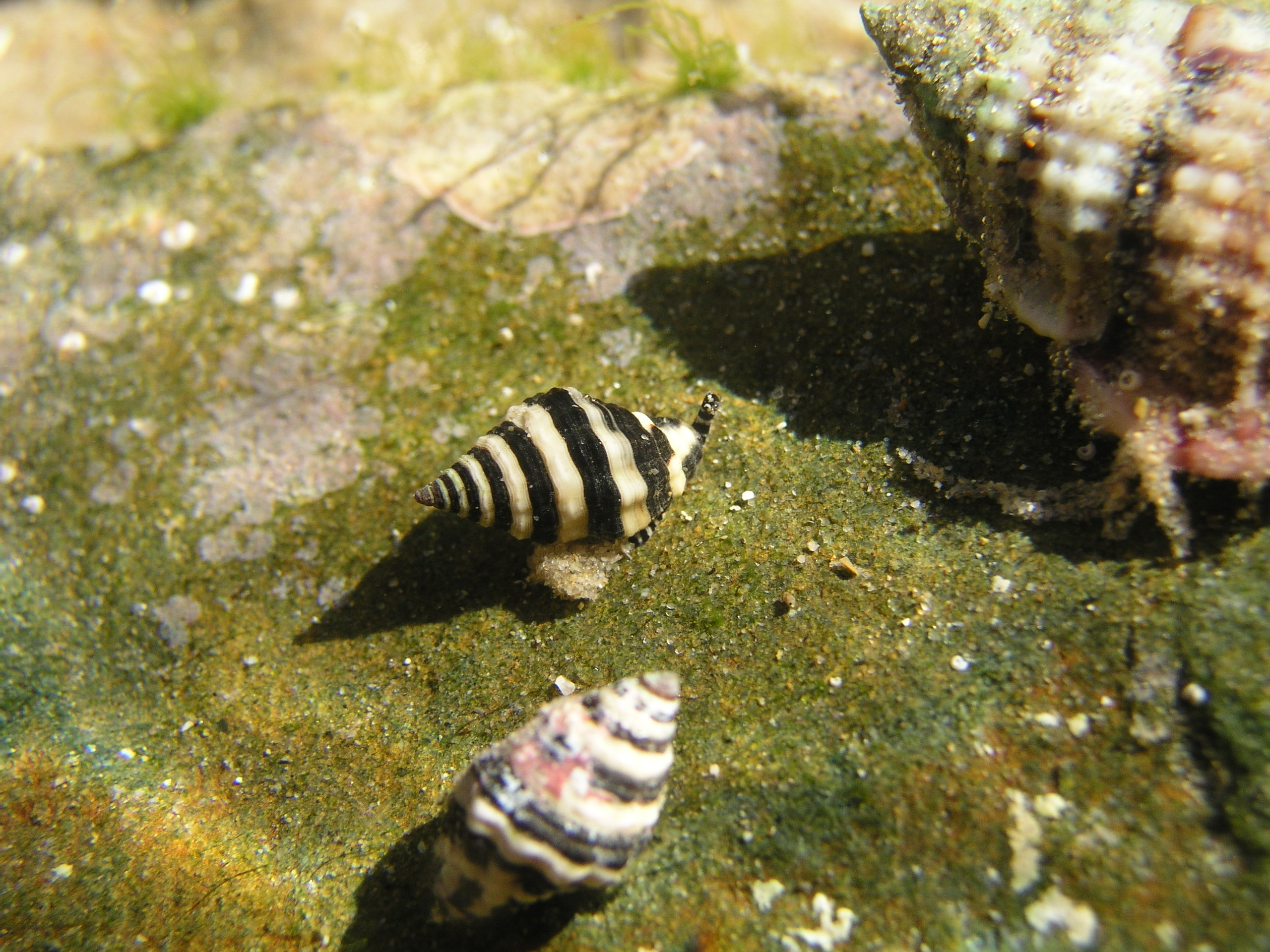
- Shell of Engina lineata

Scientific classification
- Kingdom: Animalia
- Phylum: Mollusca
- Class: Gastropoda
- Subclass: Caenogastropoda
- Order: Neogastropoda
- Family: Pisaniidae
- Genus: Engina
- Species: E. lineata

Binomial name
- Engina lineata (Reeve, 1846)

Synonyms
- Ricinula lineata Reeve, 1846 (original combination)

= Engina lineata =

Species of gastropod

Engina lineata is a species of sea snail, a marine gastropod mollusk in the family Pisaniidae.

== Description ==
Shell size 12 mm.

(Original description) The shell is ovate, stout, and solid, and is longitudinally nodosely plicate. It is white in ground color and is encircled by lead-black lines.

The species is superficially similar to Engina zonalis (Lamarck, 1822), but is slightly smaller, c.8.0 cm-10.0 cm in length. The blackish spiral zones are narrow, continuous lines, and at the sutures are wide-spaced, round or crescent-shaped black spots. The aperture is white and not purplish-brown as in E.zonalis.

== Distribution ==
This marine species occurs in the Indo-West Pacific; also off Australia (New South Wales, Northern Territory, Queensland, Western Australia) and the Philippines.
