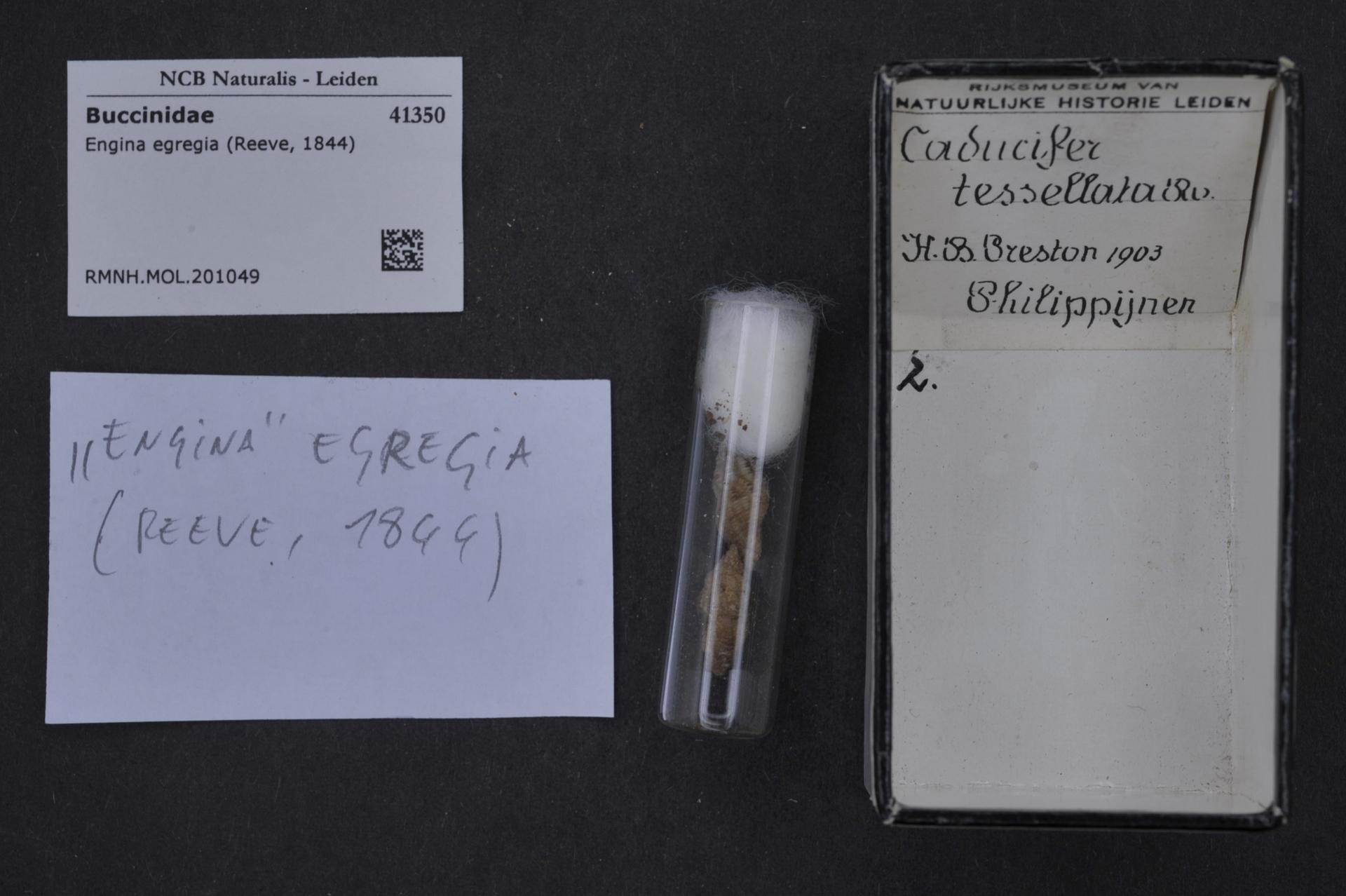

Scientific classification
- Kingdom: Animalia
- Phylum: Mollusca
- Class: Gastropoda
- Subclass: Caenogastropoda
- Order: Neogastropoda
- Family: Pisaniidae
- Genus: Engina
- Species: E. egregia

Binomial name
- Engina egregia (Reeve, 1844)

= Engina egregia =

Species of gastropod

Engina egregia is a species of sea snail, a marine gastropod mollusc in the family Pisaniidae.
