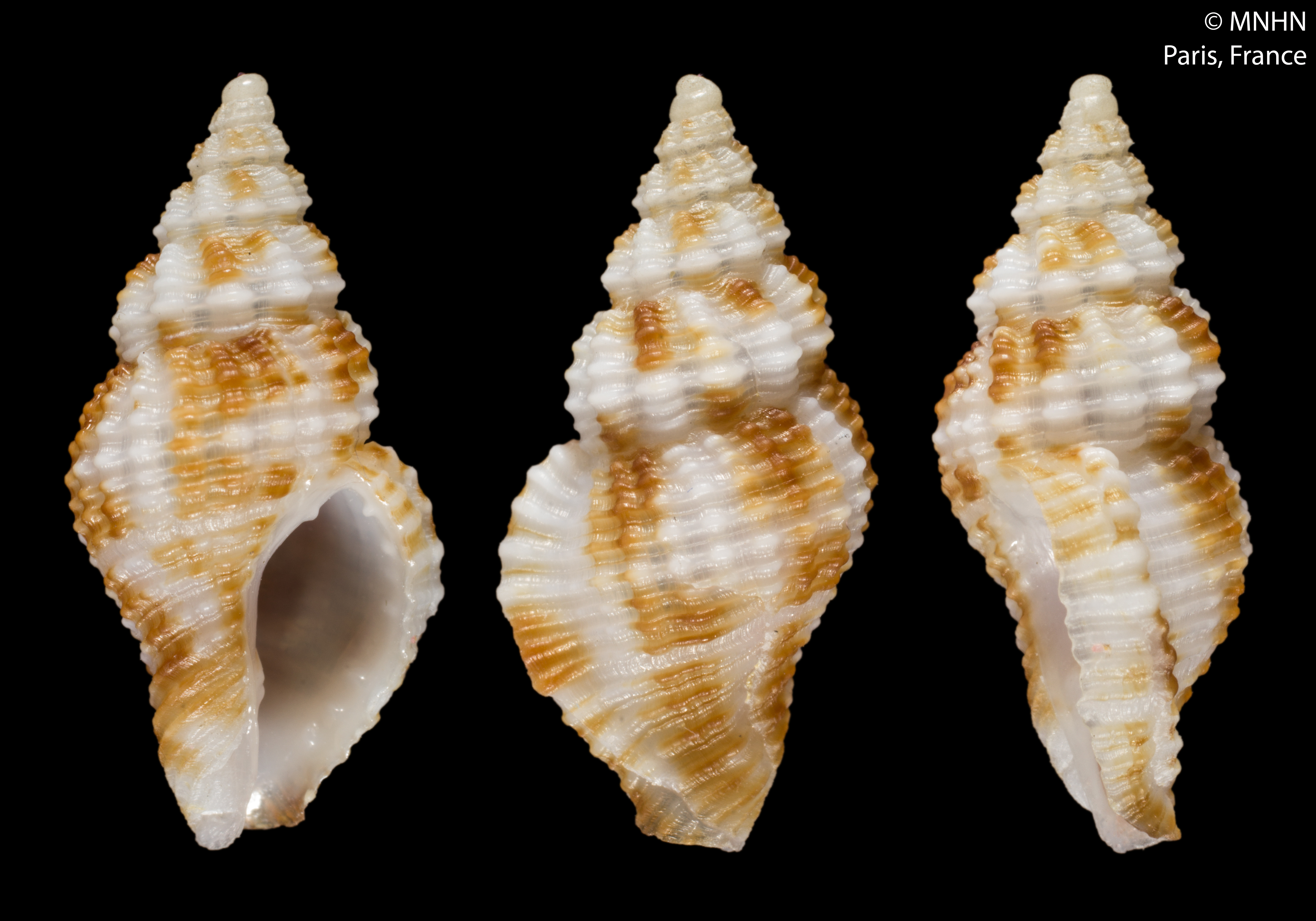
- Shell of Cancellopollia ustulata (holotype at MNHN, Paris)

Scientific classification
- Kingdom: Animalia
- Phylum: Mollusca
- Class: Gastropoda
- Subclass: Caenogastropoda
- Order: Neogastropoda
- Family: Pisaniidae
- Genus: Cancellopollia
- Species: C. ustulata

Binomial name
- Cancellopollia ustulata Vermeij & Bouchet, 1998

= Cancellopollia ustulata =

Species of gastropod

Cancellopollia ustulata is a species of sea snail, a marine gastropod mollusk in the family Pisaniidae, the true whelks and the like.

== Distribution ==
This marine species occurs in the Coral Sea.
