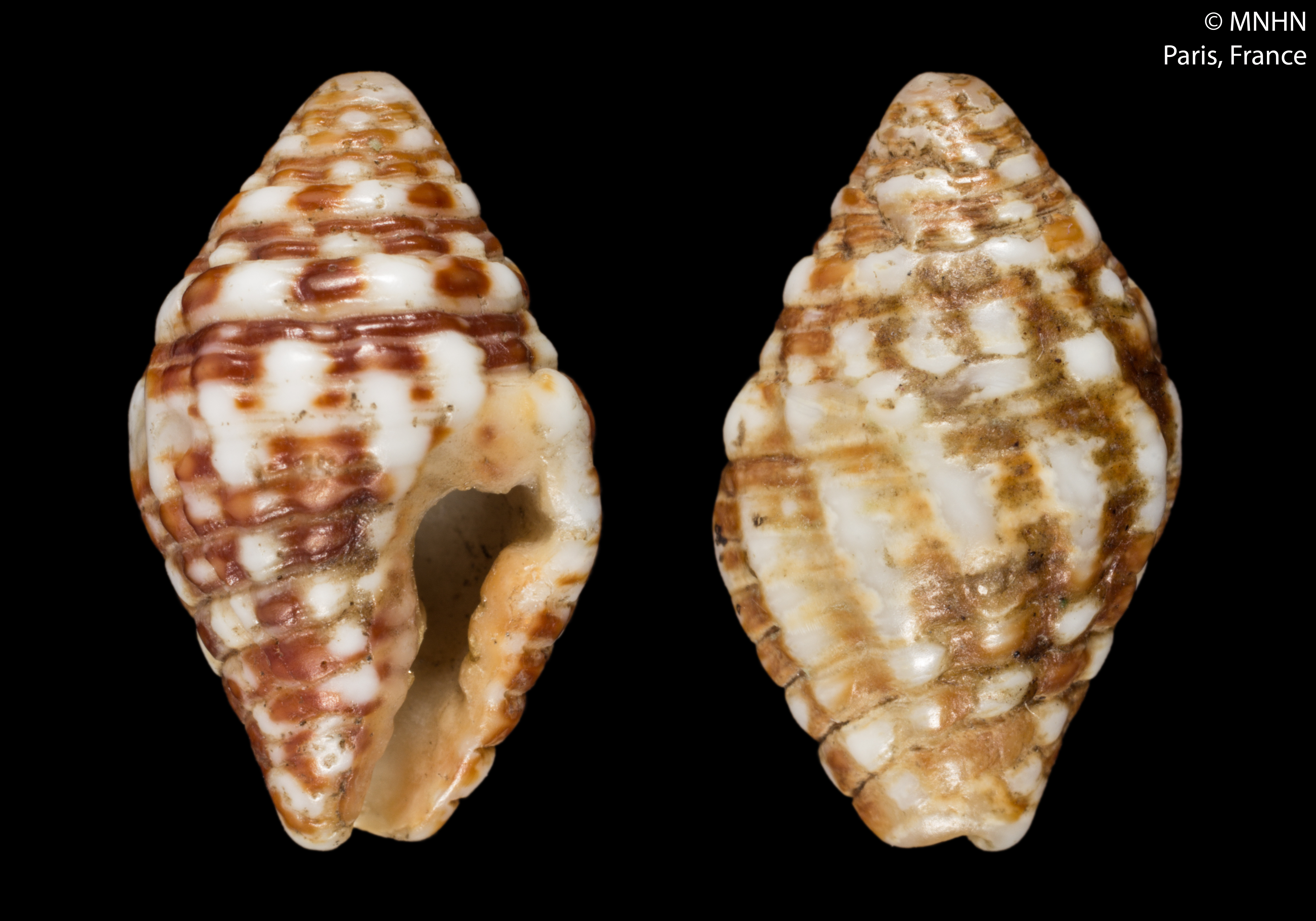
- Shell of Engina phasinola (syntype at MNHN, Paris)

Scientific classification
- Kingdom: Animalia
- Phylum: Mollusca
- Class: Gastropoda
- Subclass: Caenogastropoda
- Order: Neogastropoda
- Family: Pisaniidae
- Genus: Engina
- Species: E. phasinola

Binomial name
- Engina phasinola (P. L. Duclos, 1840)

Synonyms
- Colombella phasinola Duclos, 1840 (original combination)

= Engina phasinola =

Species of gastropod

Engina phasinola is a species of sea snail, a marine gastropod mollusk in the family Pisaniidae.

== Description ==
The shell is moderately small, 12–16 mm in length, and solid. Live-taken specimens are black in colour and are ornamented with irregular, scattered white spots. The surface is sculptured with nodulose spiral cords. The aperture is very narrow and purplish brown, and both the labial and columellar lips are prominently denticulate.

== Distribution ==
This marine species occurs in the Indo-West Pacific; also off Australia (Northern Territory, Queensland, Western Australia) and Japan.
