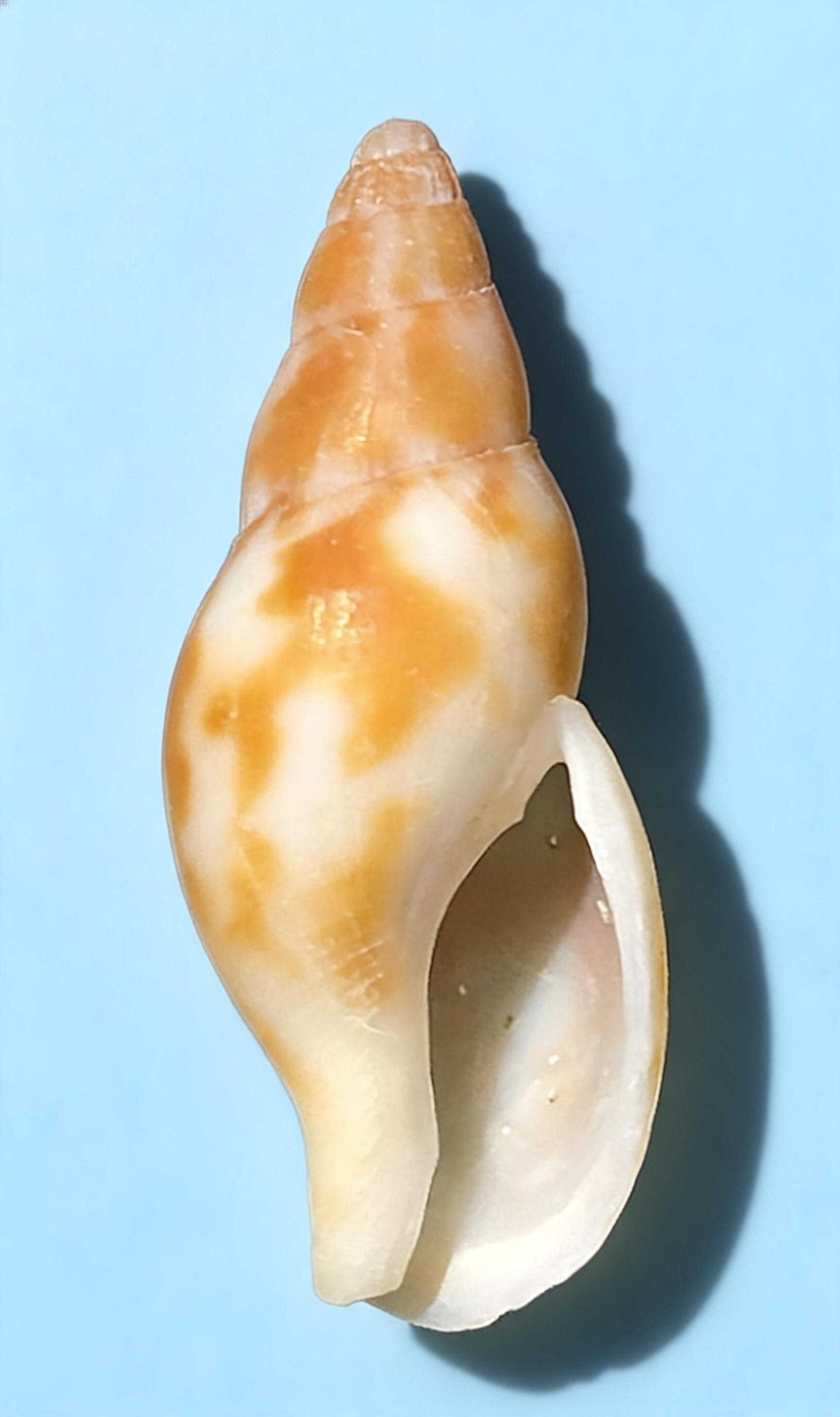
- Shell of Ecmanis ignea

Scientific classification
- Kingdom: Animalia
- Phylum: Mollusca
- Class: Gastropoda
- Subclass: Caenogastropoda
- Order: Neogastropoda
- Family: Pisaniidae
- Genus: Ecmanis
- Species: E. ignea

Binomial name
- Ecmanis ignea (Gmelin, 1791)

Synonyms
- Buccinum igneum Gmelin, 1790; Buccinum pictum Reeve, 1846 junior homonym (of Buccinum pictum Dunker, Nov.1846 [Reeve's name is from Dec. 1846] ); Pisania ignea (Gmelin, 1791); Tritonium buccinulum Röding, 1798 junior subjective synonym

= Ecmanis ignea =

Species of gastropod

Ecmanis ignea is a species of sea snail, a marine gastropod mollusk in the family Pisaniidae.

== Description ==
Its size ranges from 20 to 52 mm.

This species differs from other Pisania species by its light weight in proportion to shell size and fragile appearance. In the most senile specimens, only the first posterior labial denticles are distinct, and are followed by 4-5 blunt, almost obsolete denticleswhich are indicated as swellings. The early whorls are prominently granulose, but the last two whorls have only obsolete spiral threads or grooves.

== Distribution ==
Western Central Pacific: Philippines, Indonesia, and Guam.
