= Engina zea =

Scientific classification
- Kingdom: Animalia
- Phylum: Mollusca
- Class: Gastropoda
- Subclass: Caenogastropoda
- Order: Neogastropoda
- Family: Pisaniidae
- Genus: Engina
- Species: E. zea

Binomial name
- Engina zea Melvill, 1893

Species of gastropod

Engina zea is a species of sea snail, a marine gastropod mollusk in the family Pisaniidae.
