= Engina tuberculosa =

Scientific classification
- Kingdom: Animalia
- Phylum: Mollusca
- Class: Gastropoda
- Subclass: Caenogastropoda
- Order: Neogastropoda
- Family: Pisaniidae
- Genus: Engina
- Species: E. tuberculosa

Binomial name
- Engina tuberculosa Pease, 1863

Species of gastropod

Engina tuberculosa is a species of small sea snail, a marine gastropod mollusk in the family Pisaniidae.

== Description ==
The length of the shell attains 9 mm, its diameter 4 mm.

(Original description) The shell is fusiform, tapering at both ends, with a somewhat acuminate and sharply pointed spire. The surface is ornamented with longitudinal, tuberculate ribs intersected by transverse ridges, forming distinct nodules or tubercles at the points of intersection. The interstices are finely striated. The aperture is less than half the total shell length. The columellar lip is posteriorly corrugated or plicate, bearing small denticles. The shell is black; the body whorl is encircled by a conspicuous white band; the aperture and the apex are pure white.

== Distribution ==
This marine species occurs off Kiribati and the Fanning Island Lagoon, Central Pacific.
