= Monostiolum tessellatum =

Scientific classification
- Kingdom: Animalia
- Phylum: Mollusca
- Class: Gastropoda
- Subclass: Caenogastropoda
- Order: Neogastropoda
- Family: Pisaniidae
- Genus: Monostiolum
- Species: M. tessellatum

Binomial name
- Monostiolum tessellatum (Reeve, 1844)

Synonyms
- Caducifer swifti (Tryon, 1881); Caducifer tessellatum (Reeve, 1844); Colubraria swifti (Tryon, 1881); Daphnella igniflua (Reeve, 1845); Fusus swifti (Tryon, 1881) (unnecessary combination); Pisania igniflua (Reeve, 1845); Pleurotoma igniflua Reeve, 1845; Pollia tessellatum (Reeve, 1844); Triton (Epidromus) swifti Tryon, 1881; Triton swifti Tryon, 1881; Triton tessellatus Reeve, 1844 (basionym)

Species of gastropod

Monostiolum tessellatum is a species of sea snail, a marine gastropod mollusk in the family Pisaniidae.

== Description ==
The length of the shell attains 18 mm.

== Distribution ==
This species occurs in the Caribbean Sea, the Gulf of Mexico and the Lesser Antilles.
