= Engina demani =

Scientific classification
- Kingdom: Animalia
- Phylum: Mollusca
- Class: Gastropoda
- Subclass: Caenogastropoda
- Order: Neogastropoda
- Family: Pisaniidae
- Genus: Engina
- Species: E. demani

Binomial name
- Engina demani De Jong & Coomans, 1988

Species of gastropod

Engina demani is a species of sea snail, a marine gastropod mollusk in the family Pisaniidae.
