= Monostiolum nocturnum =

Scientific classification
- Kingdom: Animalia
- Phylum: Mollusca
- Class: Gastropoda
- Subclass: Caenogastropoda
- Order: Neogastropoda
- Family: Pisaniidae
- Genus: Monostiolum
- Species: M. nocturnum

Binomial name
- Monostiolum nocturnum Watters, 2009

Species of gastropod

Monostiolum nocturnum is a species of sea snail, a marine gastropod mollusc in the family Pisaniidae.

== Distribution ==
This marine species occurs in the Caribbean Sea off Tobago.
