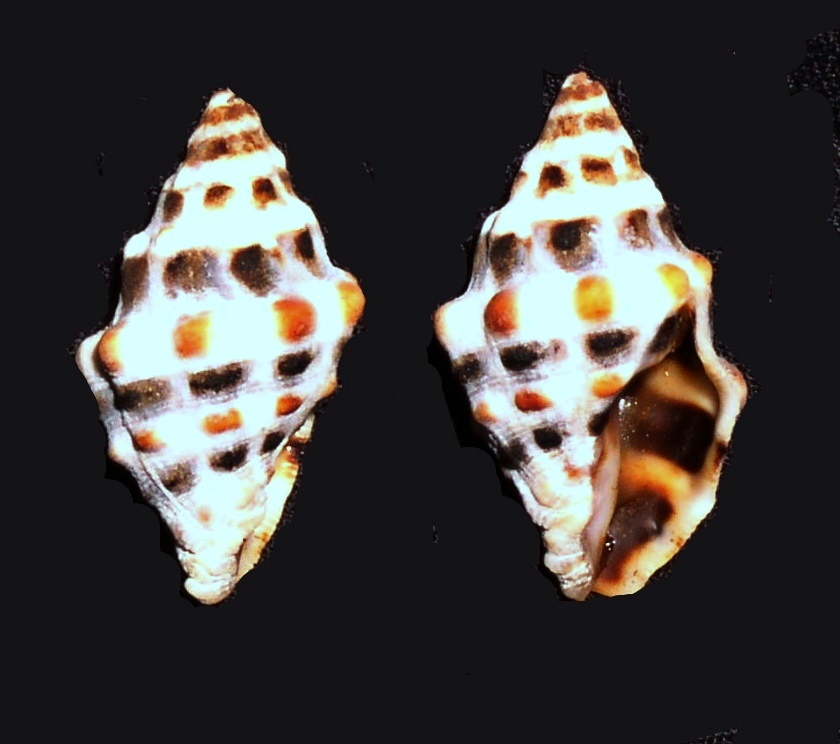

Scientific classification
- Kingdom: Animalia
- Phylum: Mollusca
- Class: Gastropoda
- Subclass: Caenogastropoda
- Order: Neogastropoda
- Family: Pisaniidae
- Genus: Engina
- Species: E. zepa

Binomial name
- Engina zepa (Duclos, 1883)

Synonyms
- Columbella zepa Duclos, 1883

= Engina zepa =

Species of gastropod

Engina zepa is a species of sea snail, a marine gastropod mollusk in the family Pisaniidae.

== Distribution ==
This species occurs in the Indian Ocean off Madagascar.
