= Hesperisternia harasewychi =

Scientific classification
- Kingdom: Animalia
- Phylum: Mollusca
- Class: Gastropoda
- Subclass: Caenogastropoda
- Order: Neogastropoda
- Family: Pisaniidae
- Genus: Hesperisternia
- Species: H. harasewychi

Binomial name
- Hesperisternia harasewychi (Petuch, 1987)

Species of gastropod

Hesperisternia harasewychi is a species of sea snail, a marine gastropod mollusc in the family Pisaniidae.

== Description ==
Original description: "Shell thin, inflated with elevated spire; 8 strong varices per whorl; body whorl ornamented with 4 large spiral cords; numerous fine threads between large cords; 4 large knobs per varix, produced by intersections of varix with spiral cord; siphonal canal short, stumpy, ornamented with numerous spiral threads; interior of aperture with large, well-developed plications on inner side of lip; suture incised, indented, producing scalariform effect; shell color bright yellow-orange, orange red, or salmon-pink; paratype (ANSP) with anterior half of body whorl bright pinkish-orange, posterior half bright yellow, producing two-toned color pattern; aperture and columella white."

== Distribution ==
Locus typicus: "(Dredged from) 150 metres depth
50 kilometres South of Apalachicola, Florida, USA."
