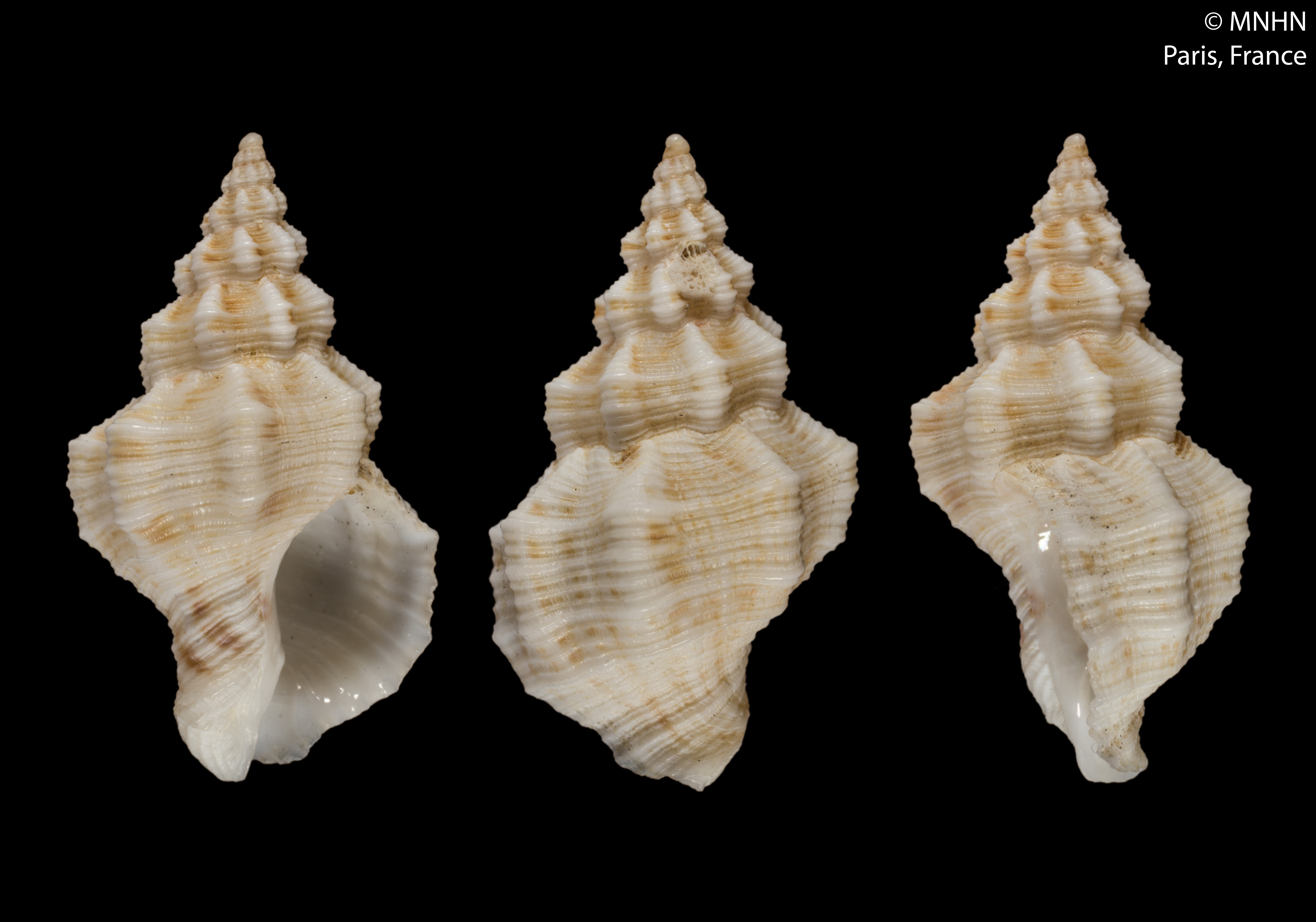
- Shell of Hesperisternia multangulus (syntype at MNHN, Paris)

Scientific classification
- Kingdom: Animalia
- Phylum: Mollusca
- Class: Gastropoda
- Subclass: Caenogastropoda
- Order: Neogastropoda
- Family: Pisaniidae
- Genus: Hesperisternia
- Species: H. multangulus

Binomial name
- Hesperisternia multangulus (Philippi, 1848)

Synonyms
- Cantharus multangulus (Philippi, 1848); Fusus multangulus Philippi, 1848 (original combination)

= Hesperisternia multangulus =

Species of gastropod

Hesperisternia multangulus, the ribbed cantharus, is a species of sea snail in the family Pisaniidae. The ribbed cantharus was first formally named by Rodolfo Amando Philippi in 1848 as Fusus multangulus. The type locality is from the Yucatán Peninsula.

== Description ==
The length of the shell attains 24.1 mm.

== Distribution ==
This species occurs off Yucatan, Mexico in the Caribbean Sea.
