= Engina ignicula =

Scientific classification
- Kingdom: Animalia
- Phylum: Mollusca
- Class: Gastropoda
- Subclass: Caenogastropoda
- Order: Neogastropoda
- Family: Pisaniidae
- Genus: Engina
- Species: E. ignicula

Binomial name
- Engina ignicula Fraussen, 2004

Species of gastropod

Engina ignicula is a species of sea snail, a marine gastropod mollusk in the family Pisaniidae.
