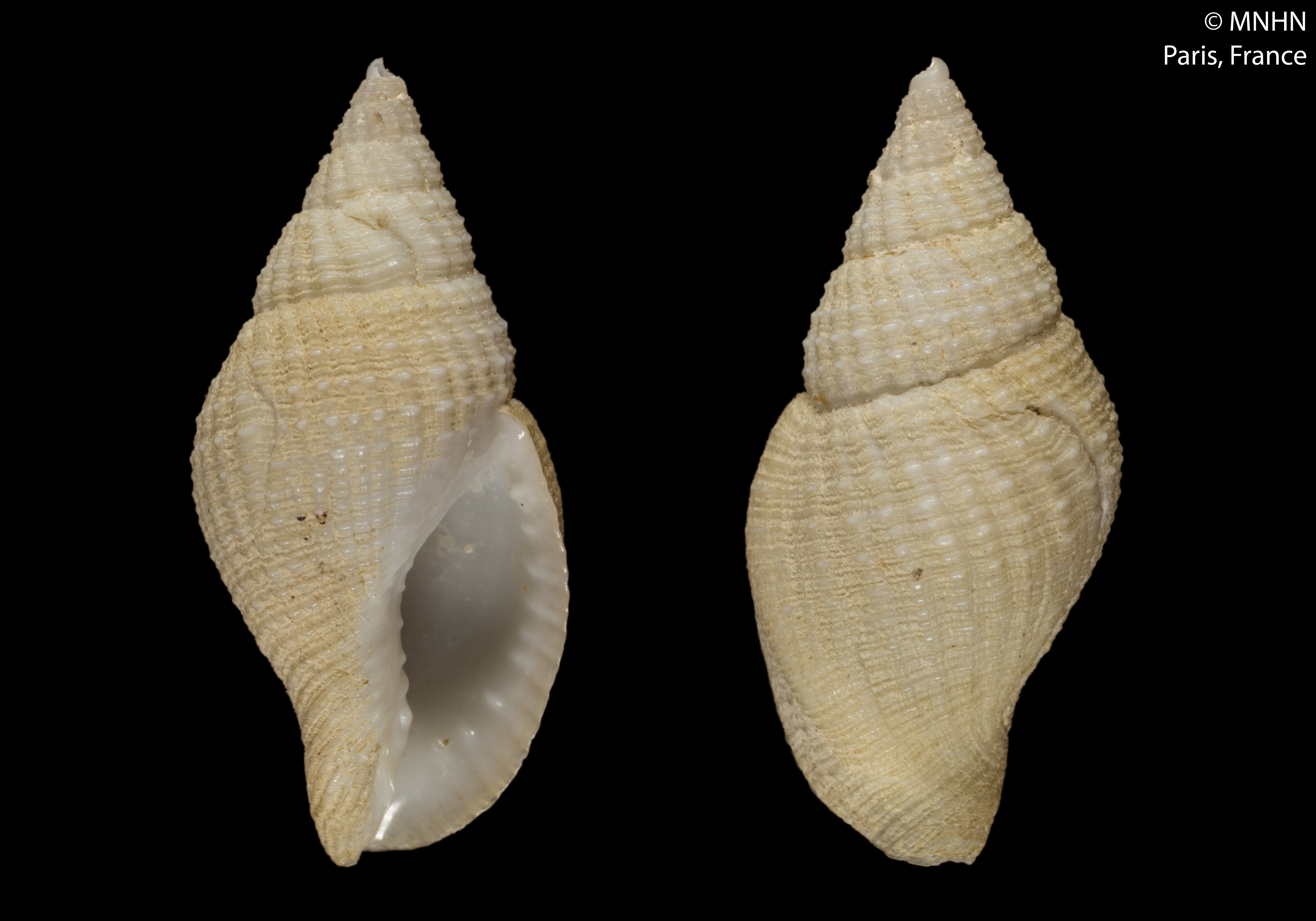
- Shell of Cancellopollia gracilis (holotype at MNHN, Paris)

Scientific classification
- Kingdom: Animalia
- Phylum: Mollusca
- Class: Gastropoda
- Subclass: Caenogastropoda
- Order: Neogastropoda
- Family: Pisaniidae
- Genus: Cancellopollia
- Species: C. gracilis

Binomial name
- Cancellopollia gracilis Vermeij & Bouchet, 1998

= Cancellopollia gracilis =

Species of gastropod

Cancellopollia gracilis is a species of sea snail, a marine gastropod mollusk in the family Pisaniidae, the true whelks and the like.

== Description ==
The snail shells are cream coloured.

== Distribution ==
This marine species occurs off New Caledonia.
