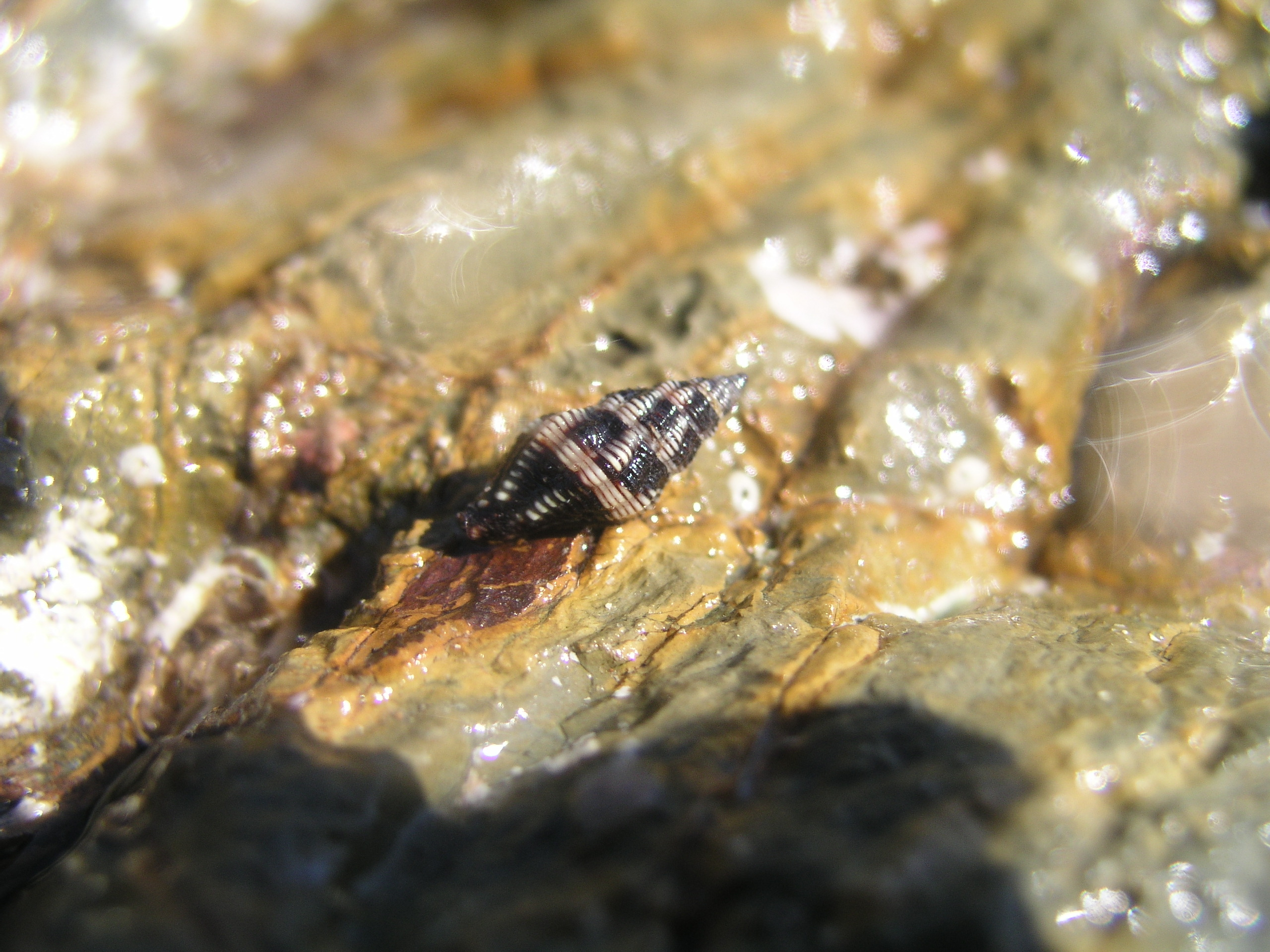
- Engina australis

Scientific classification
- Kingdom: Animalia
- Phylum: Mollusca
- Class: Gastropoda
- Subclass: Caenogastropoda
- Order: Neogastropoda
- Family: Pisaniidae
- Genus: Engina
- Species: E. australis

Binomial name
- Engina australis (Pease, 1871)

Synonyms
- Cantharus australis Pease, 1871; Tritonidea australis Reeve

= Engina australis =

Species of gastropod

Engina australis is a species of sea snail, a marine gastropod mollusk in the family Pisaniidae.

== Distribution ==
This species occurs in the Indian Ocean off the Aldabra Atoll.
