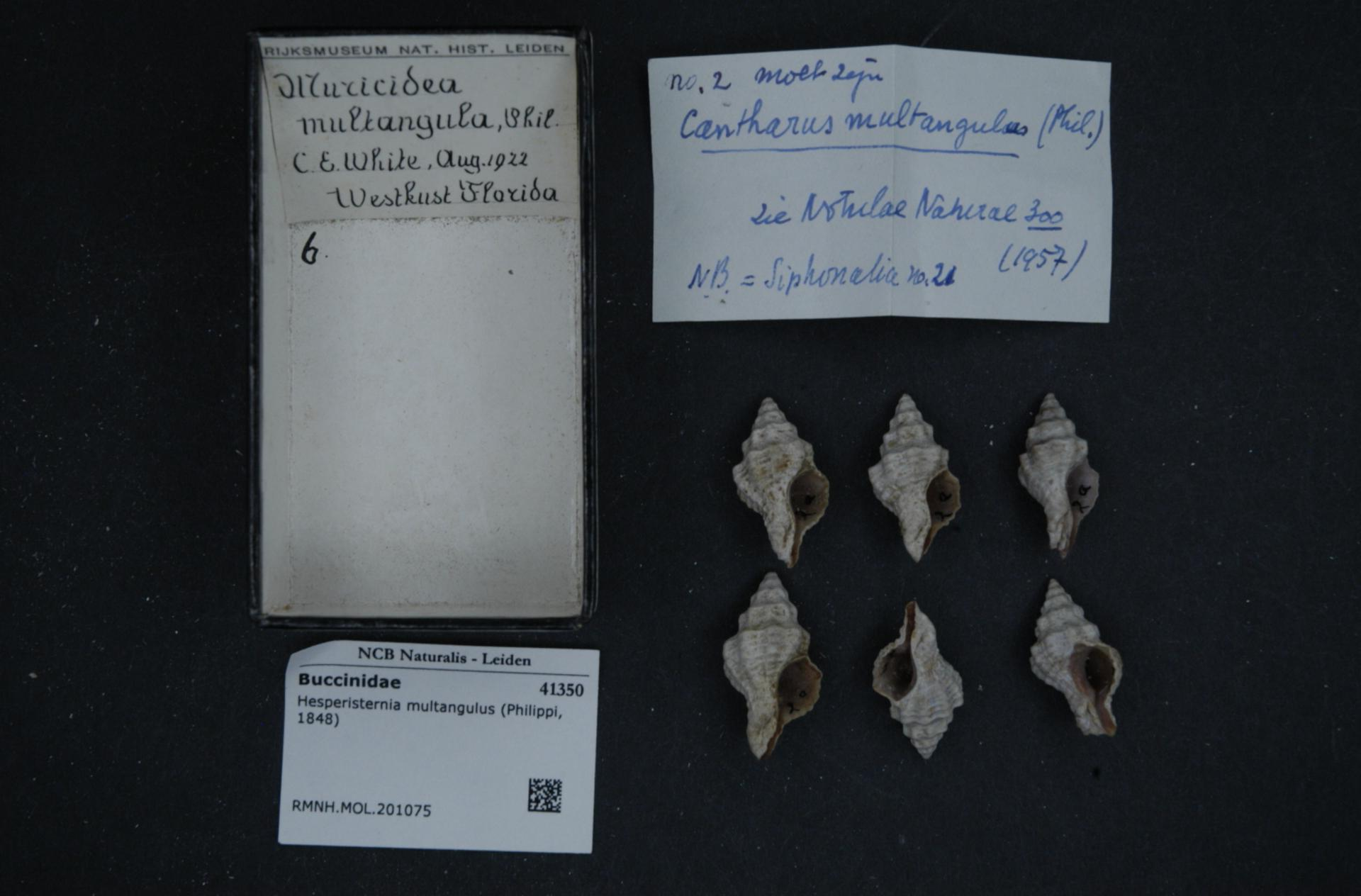
- Preserved specimen - Hesperisternia multangulus (Philippi, 1848)

Scientific classification
- Kingdom: Animalia
- Phylum: Mollusca
- Class: Gastropoda
- Subclass: Caenogastropoda
- Order: Neogastropoda
- Superfamily: Buccinoidea
- Family: Pisaniidae
- Genus: Hesperisternia; J. Gardner, 1944

Type species
- Hesperisternia waltonia J. Gardner, 1944 †

Synonyms
- Muricantharus Olsson, 1971

= Hesperisternia =

Genus of gastropods

Hesperisternia is a genus of sea snails, marine gastropod mollusks in the family Pisaniidae.

== Species ==
Species within the genus Hesperisternia include:

- Hesperisternia elegans (Dall, 1908)
- Hesperisternia grandana (Abbott, 1986)
- Hesperisternia harasewychi (Petuch, 1987)
- Hesperisternia jugosa (C. B. Adams, 1852)
- Hesperisternia karinae (Usticke, 1959)
- Hesperisternia multangulus (Philippi, 1848)
- Hesperisternia panamica (Hertlein & Strong, 1951)
- Hesperisternia shaskyi (Berry, 1959)
- Hesperisternia sulzyckii Petuch & R. F. Myers, 2014
- Hesperisternia vibex (Broderip, 1833)
- † Hesperisternia waltonia J. Gardner, 1944

Species brought into synonymy

- Hesperisternia itzamnai Watters, 2009: synonym of Engina itzamnai (Watters, 2009) (original combination)
- Hesperisternia lauta (Reeve, 1846): synonym of Engina lauta (Reeve, 1846)
