= Engina fasciata =

Scientific classification
- Kingdom: Animalia
- Phylum: Mollusca
- Class: Gastropoda
- Subclass: Caenogastropoda
- Order: Neogastropoda
- Family: Pisaniidae
- Genus: Engina
- Species: E. fasciata

Binomial name
- Engina fasciata (Bozzetti, 2009)

Synonyms
- Retizafra fasciata Bozzetti, 2009 (original combination)

Species of gastropod

Engina fasciata is a species of sea snail, a marine gastropod mollusc in the family Pisaniidae.

== Distribution ==
This species occurs in the Indian Ocean off Madagascar.
