= Engina mundula =

Scientific classification
- Kingdom: Animalia
- Phylum: Mollusca
- Class: Gastropoda
- Subclass: Caenogastropoda
- Order: Neogastropoda
- Family: Pisaniidae
- Genus: Engina
- Species: E. mundula

Binomial name
- Engina mundula Melvill & Standen

Species of gastropod

Engina mundula is a species of sea snail, a marine gastropod mollusk in the family Pisaniidae.

This is a species inquirenda.
