= Monostiolum fumosum =

Scientific classification
- Kingdom: Animalia
- Phylum: Mollusca
- Class: Gastropoda
- Subclass: Caenogastropoda
- Order: Neogastropoda
- Family: Pisaniidae
- Genus: Monostiolum
- Species: M. fumosum

Binomial name
- Monostiolum fumosum Watters, 2009

Species of gastropod

Monostiolum fumosum is a species of sea snail, a marine gastropod mollusc in the family Pisaniidae.
