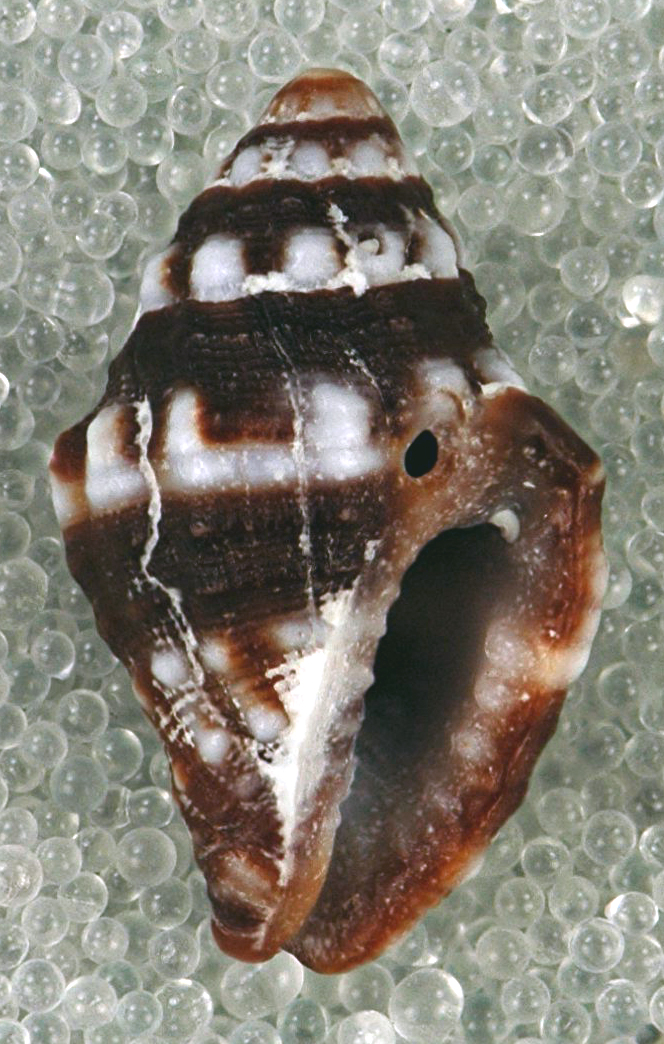
- Engina turbinella shell

Scientific classification
- Kingdom: Animalia
- Phylum: Mollusca
- Class: Gastropoda
- Subclass: Caenogastropoda
- Order: Neogastropoda
- Family: Pisaniidae
- Genus: Engina
- Species: E. turbinella

Binomial name
- Engina turbinella (Kiener, 1836)

Synonyms
- Engina zonata Gray, 1839

= Engina turbinella =

Species of gastropod

Engina turbinella is a species of small sea snail, a marine gastropod mollusk in the family Pisaniidae.
