= Dianthiphos bernardoi =

Scientific classification
- Kingdom: Animalia
- Phylum: Mollusca
- Class: Gastropoda
- Subclass: Caenogastropoda
- Order: Neogastropoda
- Family: Pisaniidae
- Genus: Dianthiphos
- Species: D. bernardoi

Binomial name
- Dianthiphos bernardoi (Costa & dos Santos Gomes, 1998)

Synonyms
- Pisania bernardoi Costa & Gomes, 1998 (original combination)

Species of gastropod

Dianthiphos bernardoi is a species of sea snail, a marine gastropod mollusk in the family Pisaniidae.
