= Hesperisternia karinae =

Scientific classification
- Kingdom: Animalia
- Phylum: Mollusca
- Class: Gastropoda
- Subclass: Caenogastropoda
- Order: Neogastropoda
- Family: Pisaniidae
- Genus: Hesperisternia
- Species: H. karinae

Binomial name
- Hesperisternia karinae (Usticke, 1959)

Synonyms
- Cantharus karinae Nowell-Usticke, 1959 (original combination); Pisania karinae (Nowell-Usticke, 1959); Pollia karinae (Nowell-Usticke, 1959)

Species of gastropod

Hesperisternia karinae is a species of sea snail, a marine gastropod mollusc in the family Pisaniidae.
