= Monostiolum harryleei =

Scientific classification
- Kingdom: Animalia
- Phylum: Mollusca
- Class: Gastropoda
- Subclass: Caenogastropoda
- Order: Neogastropoda
- Family: Pisaniidae
- Genus: Monostiolum
- Species: M. harryleei

Binomial name
- Monostiolum harryleei Garcia, 2006

Species of gastropod

Monostiolum harryleei is a species of sea snail, a marine gastropod mollusc in the family Pisaniidaes.

== Distribution ==
This marine species occurs in the Gulf of Mexico.
