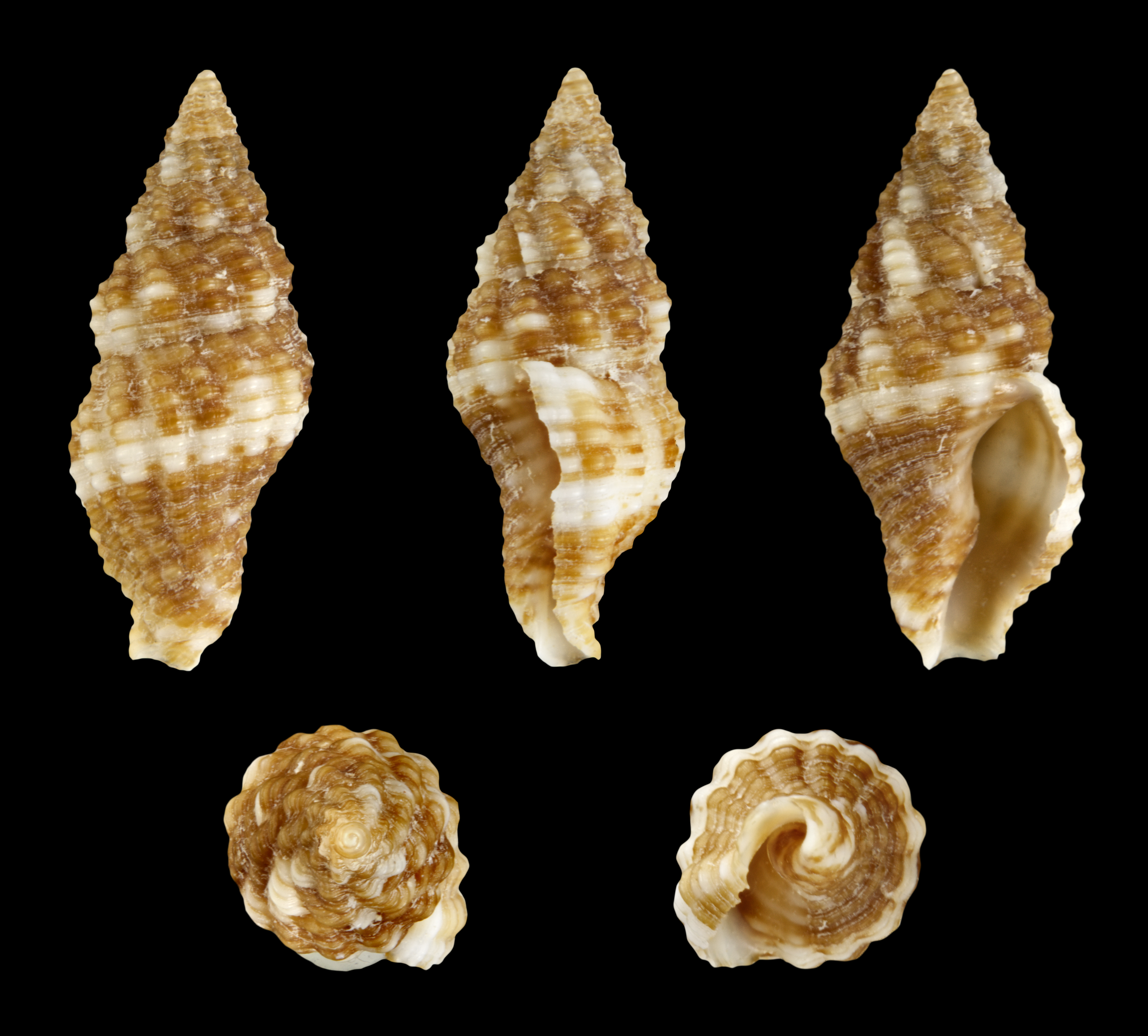

Scientific classification
- Kingdom: Animalia
- Phylum: Mollusca
- Class: Gastropoda
- Subclass: Caenogastropoda
- Order: Neogastropoda
- Family: Pisaniidae
- Genus: Engina
- Species: E. lanceola

Binomial name
- Engina lanceola (Kuroda & Habe, 1971)

Synonyms
- Cantharus lanceolatus (Kuroda & Habe, 1971); Enzinopsis lanceolata Kuroda & Habe, 1971

= Engina lanceolata =

Engina lanceola

Species of gastropod

Engina lanceola is a species of sea snail, a marine gastropod mollusk in the family Pisaniidae.
