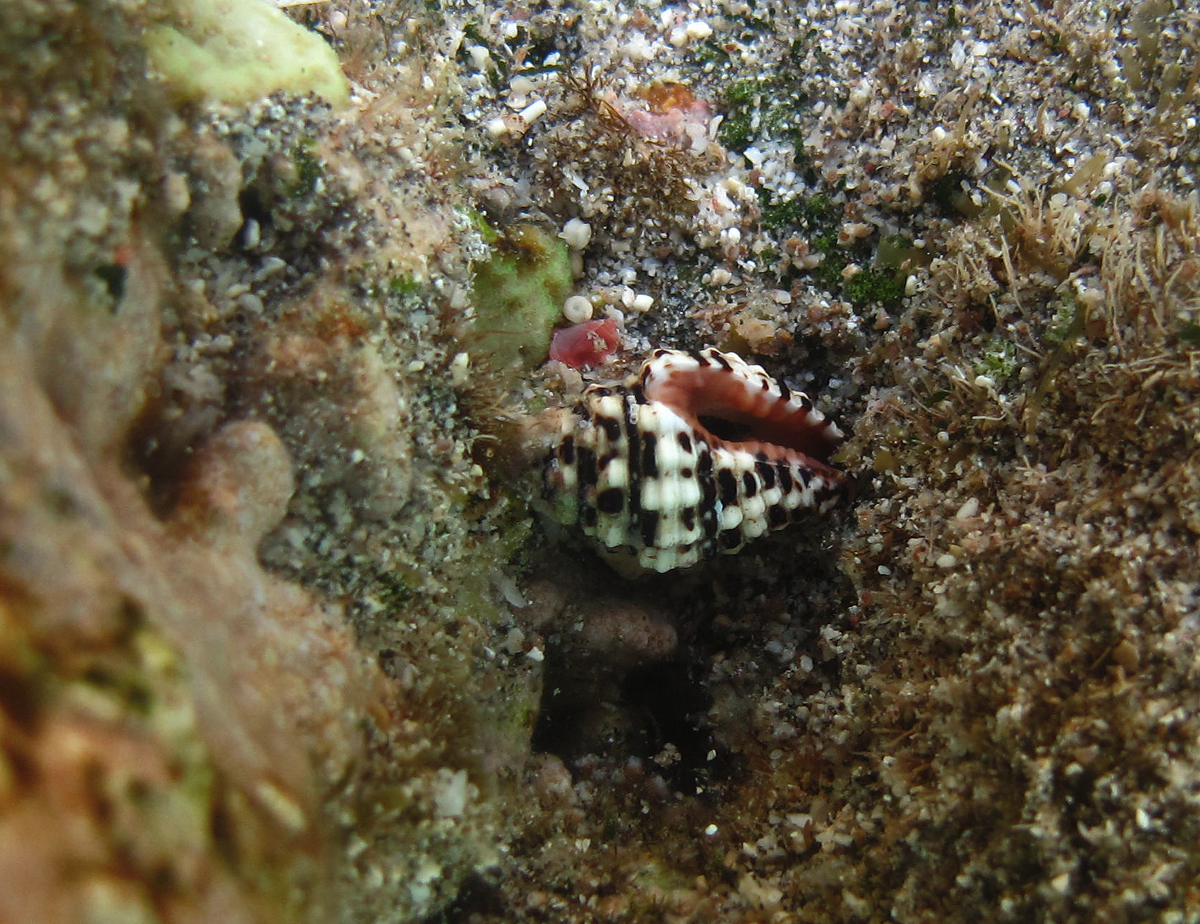

Scientific classification
- Kingdom: Animalia
- Phylum: Mollusca
- Class: Gastropoda
- Subclass: Caenogastropoda
- Order: Neogastropoda
- Family: Pisaniidae
- Genus: Engina
- Species: E. bonasia

Binomial name
- Engina bonasia Martens, 1880

Synonyms
- Engina zatricium Melvill, 1893; Peristernia bonasia (Martens, 1880); Plicatella (Peristernia) bonasia E. von Martens, 1880 (basionym); Plicatella bonasia Martens, 1880 (original combination)

= Engina bonasia =

Species of gastropod

Engina bonasia is a species of sea snail, a marine gastropod mollusk in the family Pisaniidae.

== Distribution ==
This species occurs in the Indian Ocean off Chagos, Aldabra and the Mascarene Islands.
