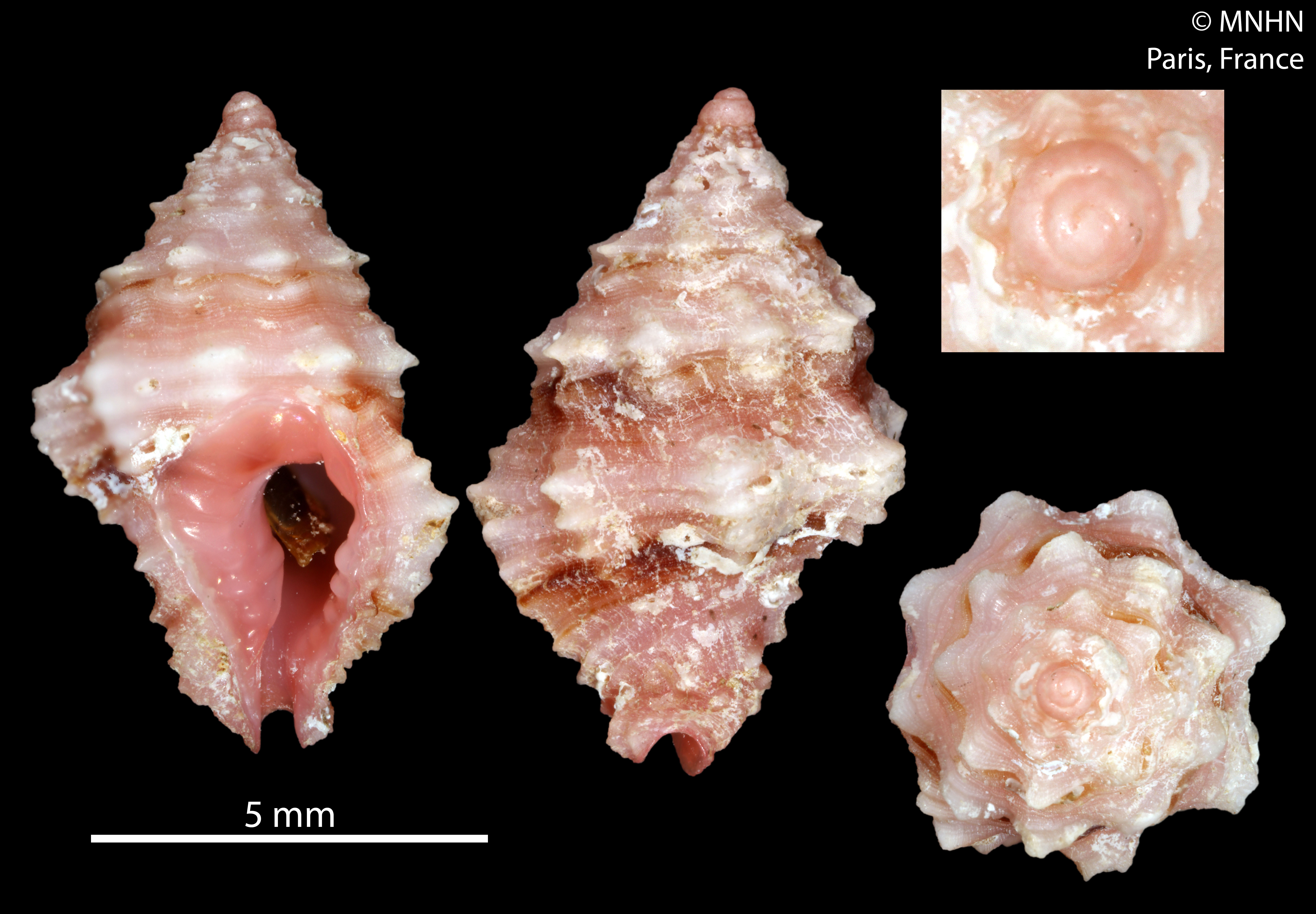
- Shell of Engina chinoi (paratype at MNHN, Paris)

Scientific classification
- Kingdom: Animalia
- Phylum: Mollusca
- Class: Gastropoda
- Subclass: Caenogastropoda
- Order: Neogastropoda
- Family: Pisaniidae
- Genus: Engina
- Species: E. chinoi

Binomial name
- Engina chinoi Fraussen, 2009

= Engina chinoi =

Species of gastropod

Engina chinoi is a species of sea snail, a marine gastropod mollusc in the family Pisaniidae,.

== Distribution ==
This marine species occurs off the Philippines.
