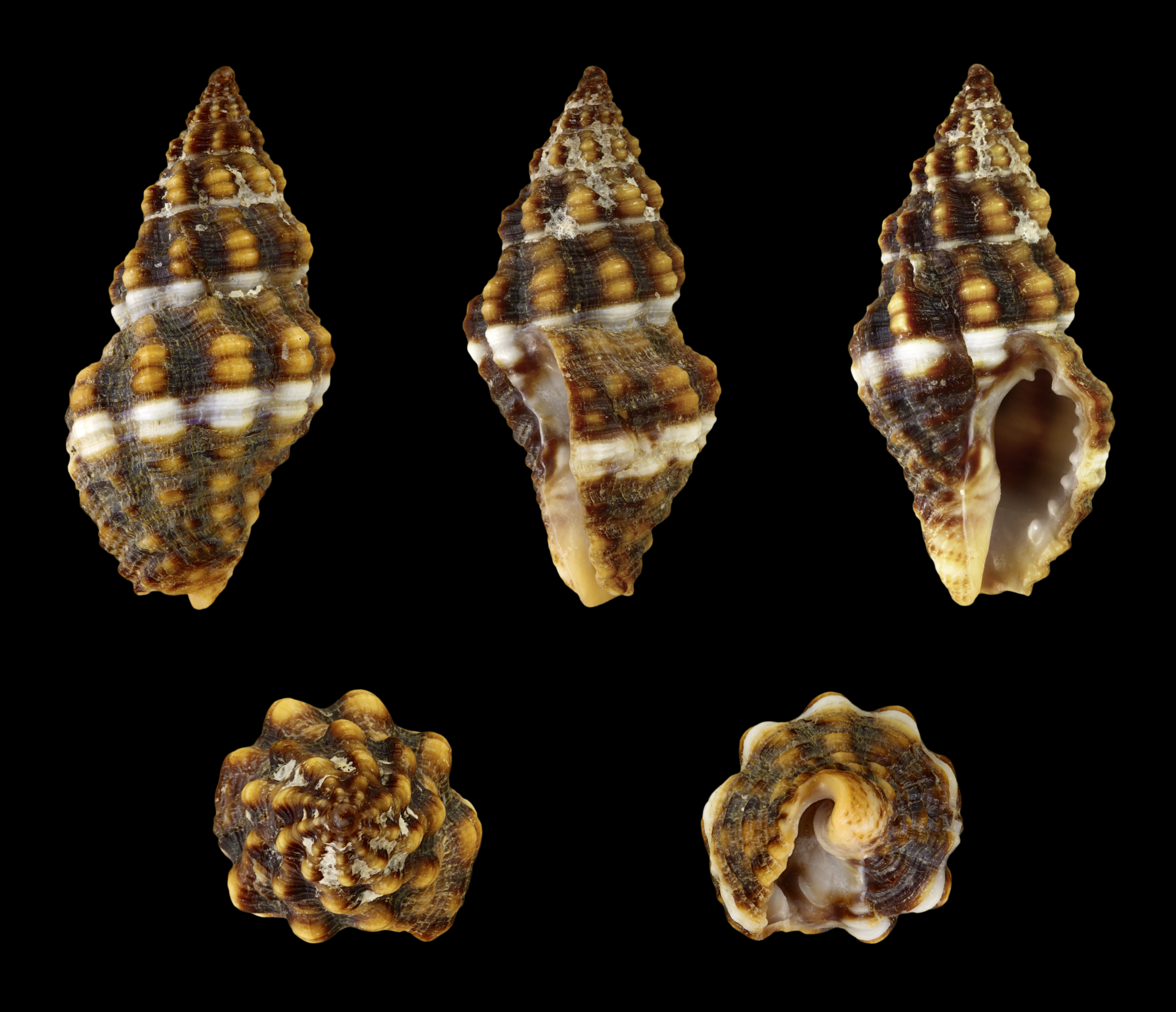

Scientific classification
- Kingdom: Animalia
- Phylum: Mollusca
- Class: Gastropoda
- Subclass: Caenogastropoda
- Order: Neogastropoda
- Family: Pisaniidae
- Genus: Enginella
- Species: E. leucozona

Binomial name
- Enginella leucozona (Philippi, 1843)

Synonyms
- Buccinum leucozonum Philippi, 1844; Engina bicolor (Cantraine, 1835); Engina bicolor var. diversicolor Coen, 1933; Engina bicolor var. inversicolor Coen, 1937; Engina leucozona (Philippi, 1843); Fusus fasciolarioides Forbes, 1844; Fusus karamanensis Forbes, 1844 (dubious synonym); Murex bicolor Cantraine, 1835 (invalid: junior homonym of Murex bicolor Risso, 1826 and Murex bicolor Valenciennes, 1832); Pollia bicolor (Cantraine, 1835); Pollia bicolor var. lata Pallary, 1917

= Enginella leucozona =

Species of gastropod

Enginella leucozona is a species of sea snail, a marine gastropod mollusc in the family Pisaniidae.
