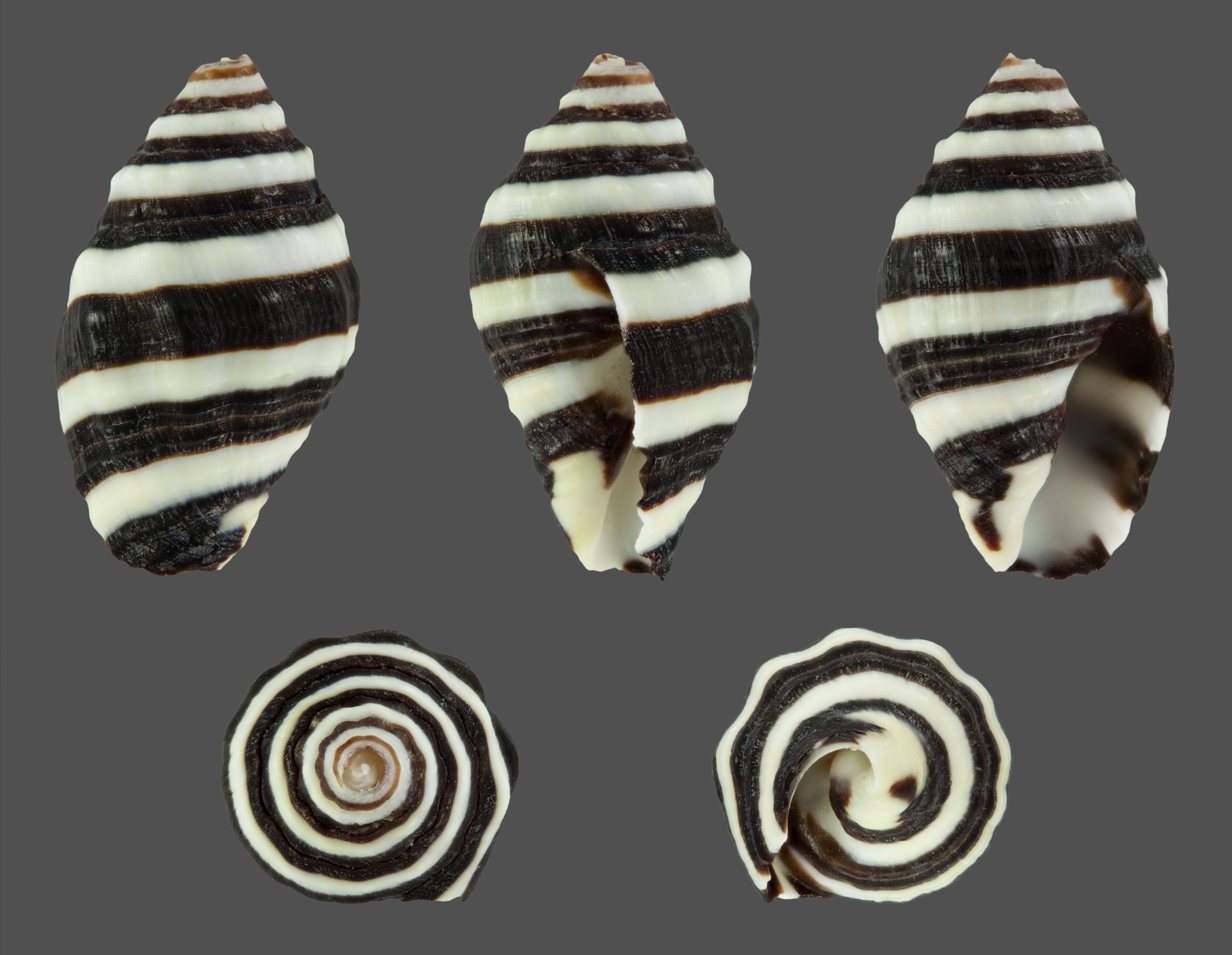
- Shell of Engina mendicaria

Scientific classification
- Kingdom: Animalia
- Phylum: Mollusca
- Class: Gastropoda
- Subclass: Caenogastropoda
- Order: Neogastropoda
- Family: Pisaniidae
- Genus: Engina
- Species: E. mendicaria

Binomial name
- Engina mendicaria (Linnaeus, 1758)

Synonyms
- Columbella mendicaria (Linnaeus, 1758); Voluta mendicaria Linnaeus, 1758

= Engina mendicaria =

Species of gastropod

Engina mendicaria, common name striped engina or bumble bee snail, is a species of sea snail, a marine gastropod mollusk in the family Pisaniidae.

== Description ==
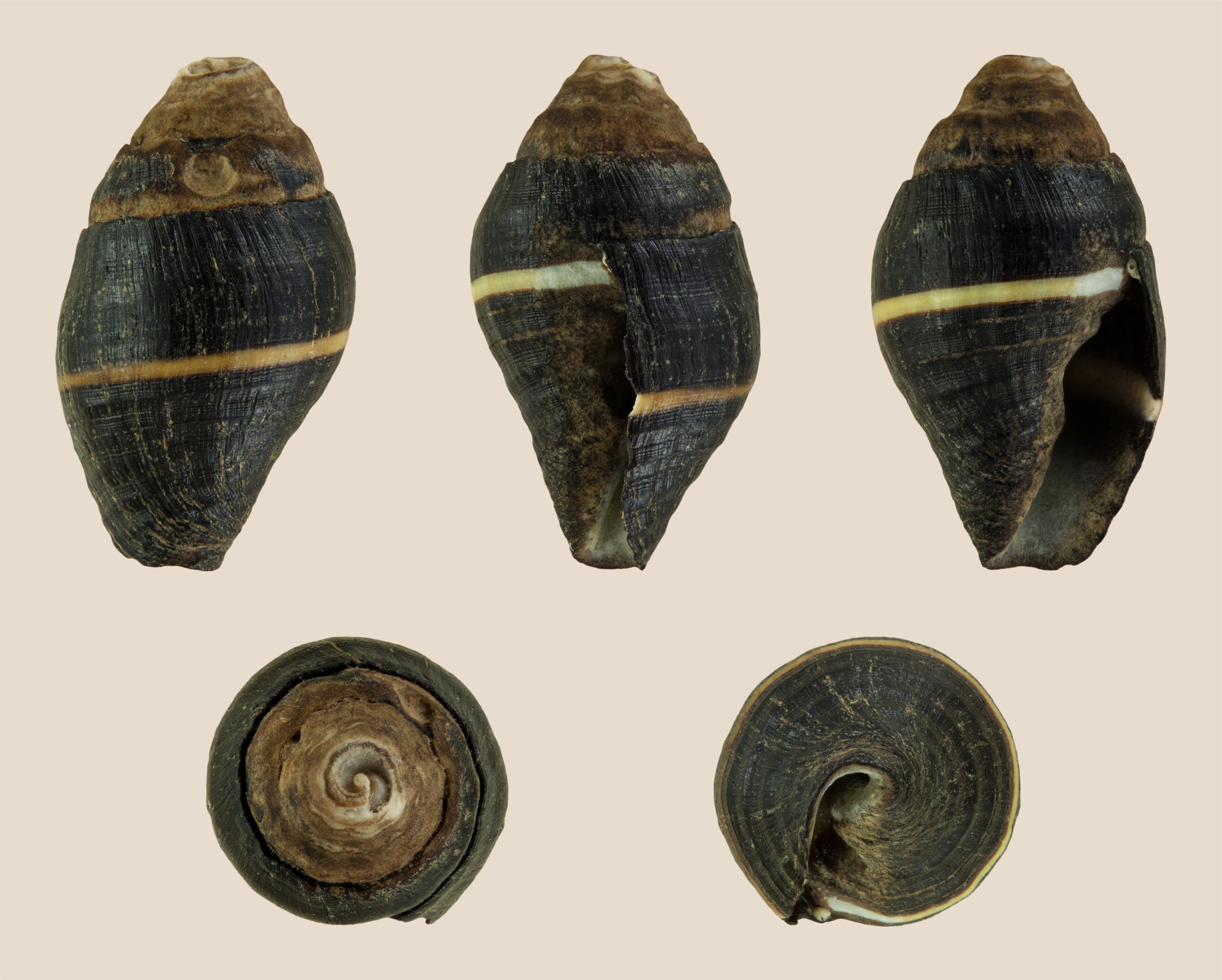
var. unilineata

The shell size varies between 10 mm and 20 mm. This shell shows a white or yellowish background with a few transversal black bands and resembles the yellow and black pattern of wasps and bees (hence a common name).

In comparison with other Pacific Engina species, E. mendicaria is relatively smooth, with only the early whorls bearing axial costae. The shell is purplish black and is ornamented with yellow or white transverse bands of varying width. The columella differs from that of other Engina species in being smooth, apart from one to two neat denticles.

== Distribution ==
This species occurs in the Red Sea and in the Indian Ocean off Aldabra, Chagos, Kenya, Madagascar, Mauritius, Mozambique, Tanzania, in the tropical Indo-Pacific, Papua New Guinea and Australia (Northern Territory, Queensland, Western Australia).

Specimens are most commonly found under basalt rocks at high tide level.

== Habitat ==
These carnivore sea snails live on rocky shores and sand beds. They are mainly nocturnal.
