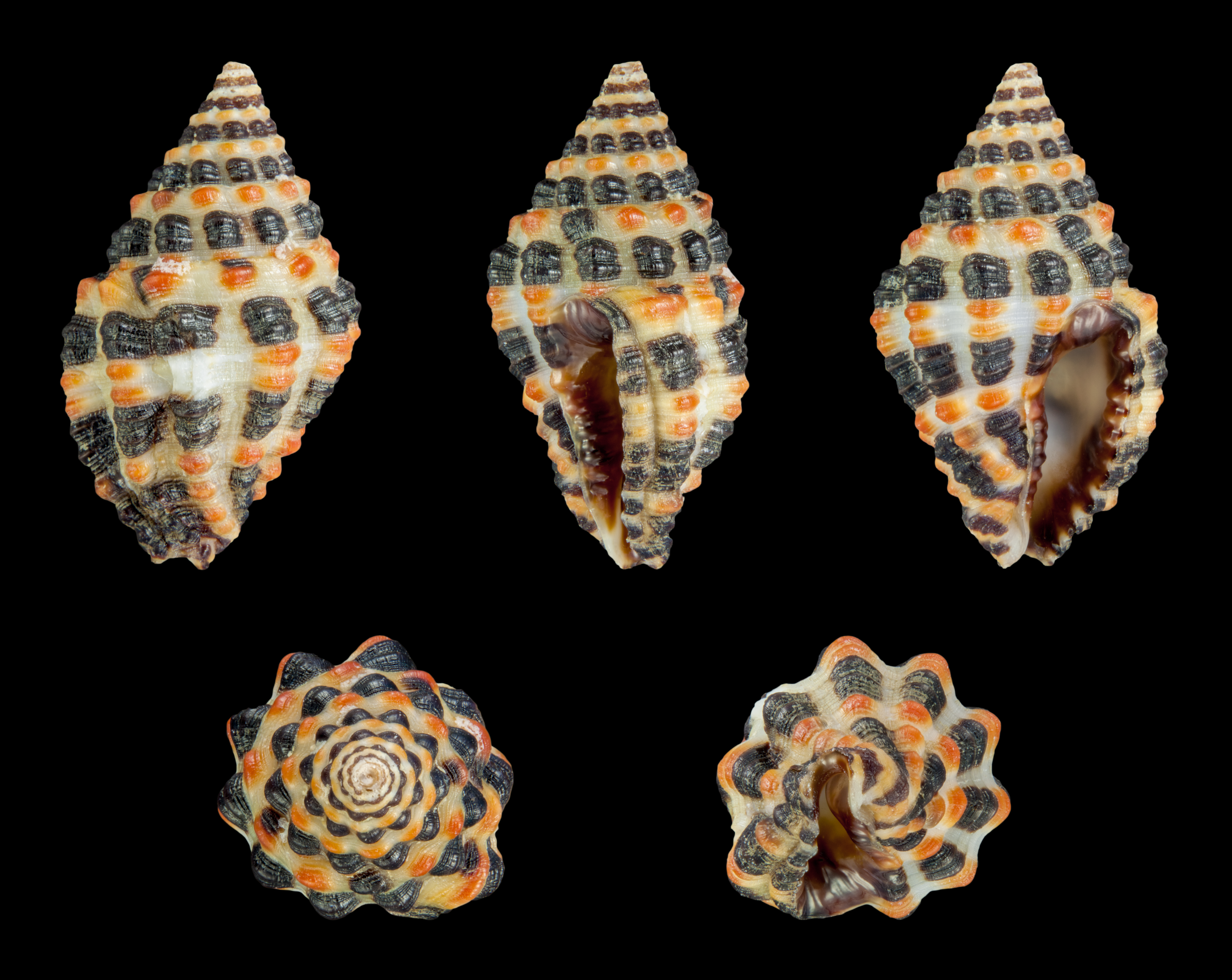
- Shell of Engina alveolata

Scientific classification
- Kingdom: Animalia
- Phylum: Mollusca
- Class: Gastropoda
- Subclass: Caenogastropoda
- Order: Neogastropoda
- Family: Pisaniidae
- Genus: Engina
- Species: E. alveolata

Binomial name
- Engina alveolata (Kiener, 1836)

Synonyms
- Engina histrio (Reeve, 1846); Engina trifasciata (Reeve, 1846); Purpura alveolata Kiener, 1835 superseded combination (original combination); Ricinula forticostata Reeve, 1846; Ricinula histrio Reeve, 1846; Ricinula trifasciata Reeve, 1846

= Engina alveolata =

Species of gastropod

Engina alveolata is a species of sea snail, a marine gastropod mollusk in the family Pisaniidae.

== Description ==
Shell size attains 25 mm.

The shell is white in colour and striking in its ornamentation, being decorated with double rows of black nodules that alternate with intermediate rows of reddish-orange nodules. The columella is a deep reddish-brown and distinctly denticulate, turning lirate as it extends onto the parietal wall. The operculum is relatively small and translucent yellowish-brown, though it features a prominent dark brown central zone and a basal nucleus. Anatomically, the radula is equipped with pentacuspid rachidians and tricuspid laterals.

In some individuals, the characteristic reddish-orange nodules are occasionally missing altogether. It is precisely upon this variant form that the holotype Purpura alveolata was originally based.

== Distribution ==
This species is rather common throughout the Pacific; also occurring off Queensland, Australia.

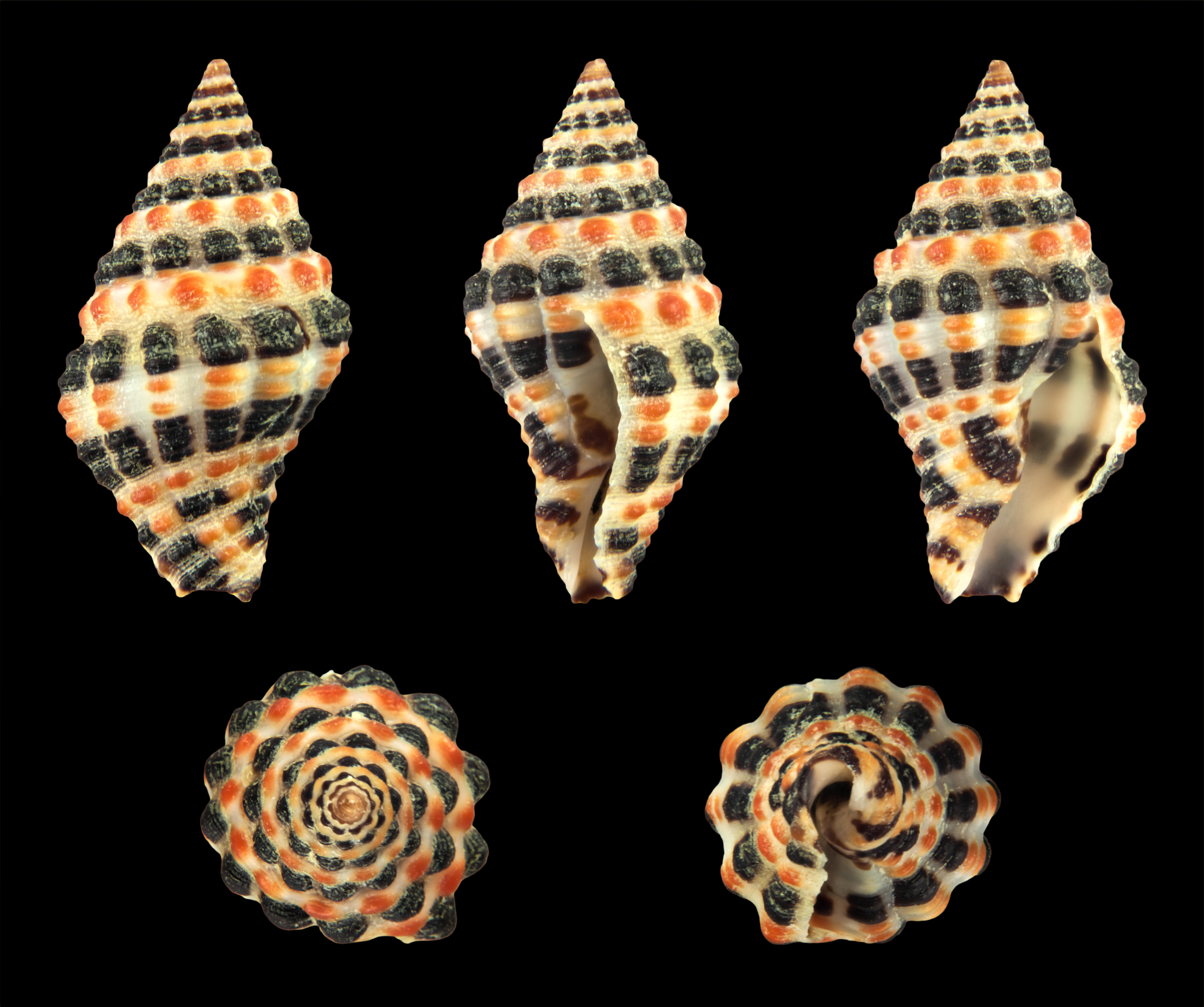
Juvenile
