= Engina itzamnai =

Scientific classification
- Kingdom: Animalia
- Phylum: Mollusca
- Class: Gastropoda
- Subclass: Caenogastropoda
- Order: Neogastropoda
- Family: Pisaniidae
- Genus: Engina
- Species: E. itzamnai

Binomial name
- Engina itzamnai (Watters, 2009)

Synonyms
- Engina dicksoni Petuch, 2013; Hesperisternia itzamnai Watters, 2009 (original combination)

Species of gastropod

Engina itzamnai is a species of sea snail, a marine gastropod mollusc in the family Pisaniidae.

== Distribution ==
This marine species occurs of Quintana Roo, Yucatán, Mexico.
