= Engina goncalvesi =

Scientific classification
- Kingdom: Animalia
- Phylum: Mollusca
- Class: Gastropoda
- Subclass: Caenogastropoda
- Order: Neogastropoda
- Family: Pisaniidae
- Genus: Engina
- Species: E. goncalvesi

Binomial name
- Engina goncalvesi Coltro, 2005

Synonyms
- Anna goncalvesi (Coltro, 2005)

Species of gastropod

Engina goncalvesi is a species of sea snail, a marine gastropod mollusk in the family Pisaniidae,.
