= Steye =

Scientific classification
- Kingdom: Animalia
- Phylum: Mollusca
- Class: Gastropoda
- Subclass: Caenogastropoda
- Order: Neogastropoda
- Family: Pisaniidae
- Genus: Steye; Faber, 2004

Type species
- Steye janasaraiarum Faber, 2004

Genus of gastropods

Steye is a genus of sea snails, marine gastropod mollusks in the family Pisaniidae.

== Species ==
Species within the genus Steye include:

- Steye janasaraiarum Faber, 2004
