= Ameranna =

Scientific classification
- Kingdom: Animalia
- Phylum: Mollusca
- Class: Gastropoda
- Subclass: Caenogastropoda
- Order: Neogastropoda
- Family: Pisaniidae
- Genus: Ameranna; Landau & Vermeij, 2012

Type species
- Anna florida Garcia, 2008

Genus of gastropods

Ameranna is a genus of sea snails, marine gastropod molluscs in the family Pisaniidae.

== Species ==
According to the World Register of Marine Species (WoRMS), the following species with valid names are included within the genus Anna :

- Ameranna capixaba (Coltro & Dornellas, 2013)
- Ameranna florida (Garcia, 2008)
- Ameranna milleri (Nowell-Usticke, 1959)
- Ameranna royalensis (Watters, 2009)
- Ameranna willemsae (De Jong & Coomans, 1988)
