= Ameranna florida =

Scientific classification
- Kingdom: Animalia
- Phylum: Mollusca
- Class: Gastropoda
- Subclass: Caenogastropoda
- Order: Neogastropoda
- Family: Pisaniidae
- Genus: Ameranna
- Species: A. florida

Binomial name
- Ameranna florida (Garcia, 2008)

Synonyms
- Anna florida Garcia, 2008 (basionym)

Species of gastropod

Ameranna florida is a species of sea snail, a marine gastropod mollusk in the family Pisaniidae.
