= Dianthiphos =

Scientific classification
- Kingdom: Animalia
- Phylum: Mollusca
- Class: Gastropoda
- Subclass: Caenogastropoda
- Order: Neogastropoda
- Family: Pisaniidae
- Genus: Dianthiphos; Watters, 2009

Type species
- Pisania bernardoi Costa & Gomes, 1998

Genus of gastropods

Dianthiphos is a genus of sea snails, marine gastropod mollusks in the family Pisaniidae.

== Species ==
Species within the genus Dianthiphos include:

- Dianthiphos bernardoi (Costa & Gomes, 1998)
- Dianthiphos electrum Watters, 2009
