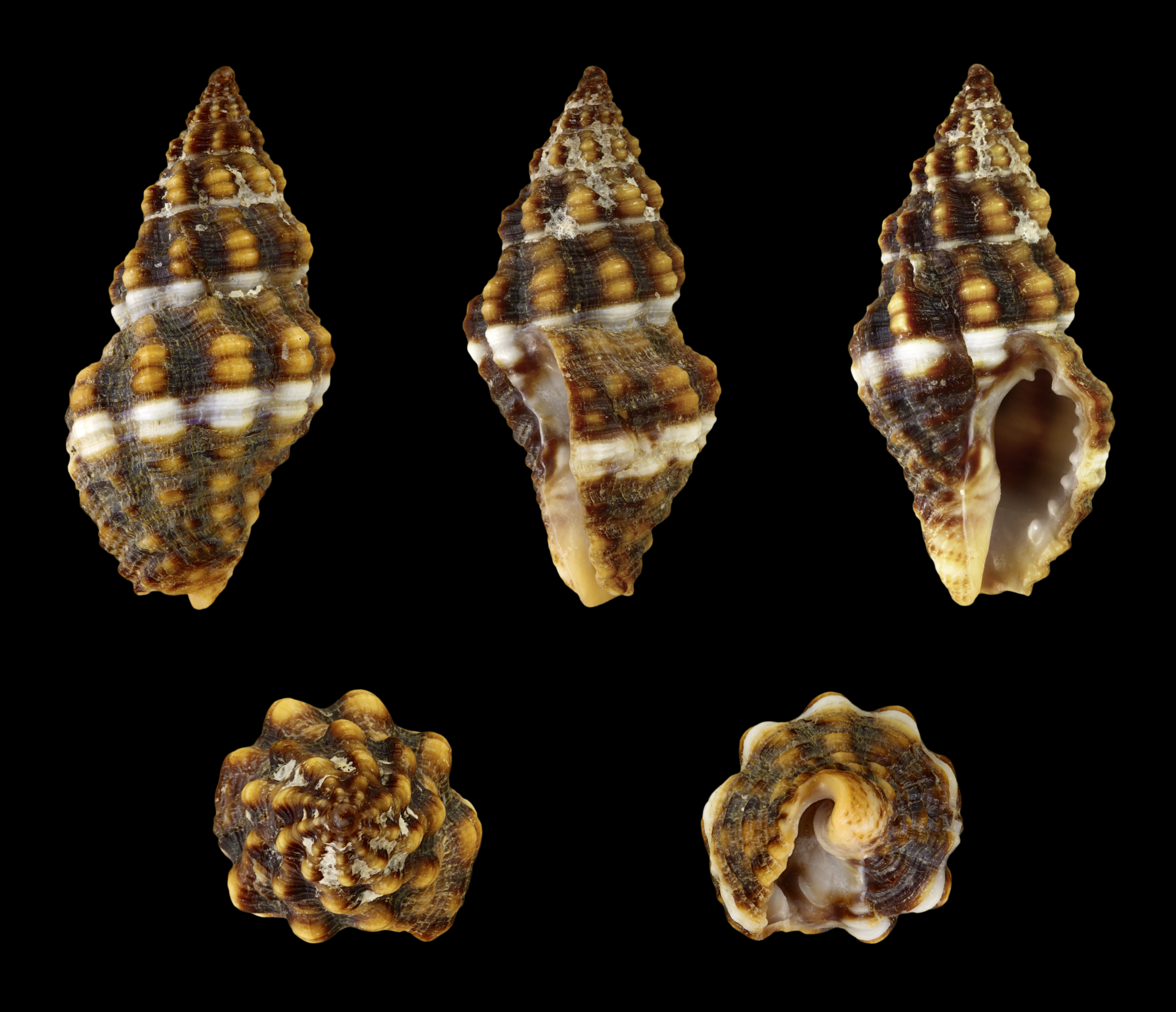
- Shell of Enginella leucozona

Scientific classification
- Kingdom: Animalia
- Phylum: Mollusca
- Class: Gastropoda
- Subclass: Caenogastropoda
- Order: Neogastropoda
- Family: Pisaniidae
- Genus: Enginella; Monterosato, 1917

Type species
- Murex bicolor Cantraine, 1835

Synonyms
- Engina (Enginella) Monterosato, 1917

= Enginella =

Genus of sea snails

Enginella is a genus of sea snails, marine gastropod mollusks in the family Pisaniidae.

== Species ==
According to the World Register of Marine Species (WoRMS), the following species with valid names are included within the genus Enginella :

- Enginella albozonata (E. A. Smith, 1890)
- Enginella leucozona (R. A. Philippi, 1844)
