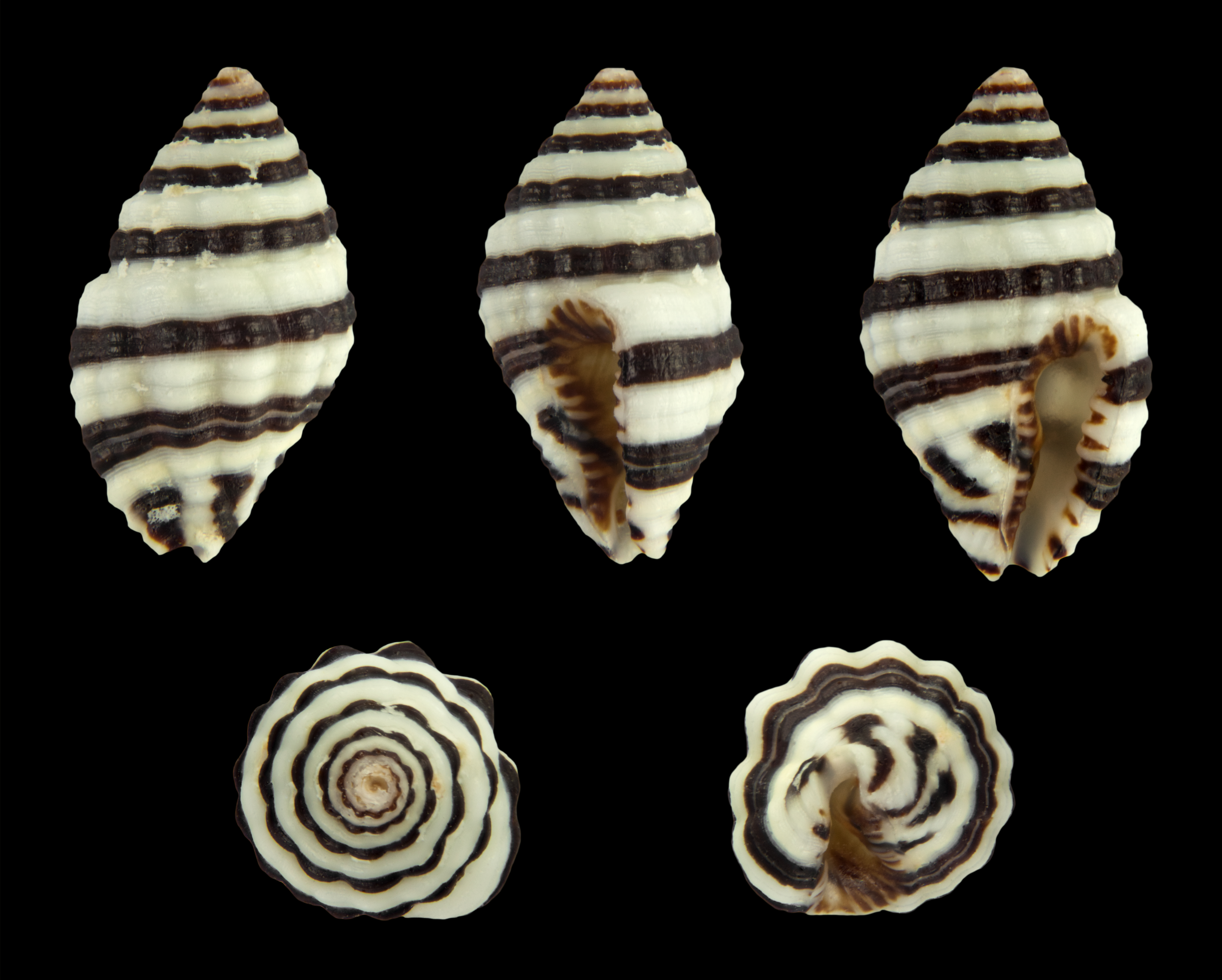
- Shell of Engina zonalis

Scientific classification
- Kingdom: Animalia
- Phylum: Mollusca
- Class: Gastropoda
- Subclass: Caenogastropoda
- Order: Neogastropoda
- Family: Pisaniidae
- Genus: Engina
- Species: E. zonalis

Binomial name
- Engina zonalis (Lamarck, 1822)

Synonyms
- Colombella zonalis Lamarck, 1822 superseded combination; Engina zonata (Reeve, 1846)

= Engina zonalis =

Species of gastropod

Engina zonalis is a species of sea snail, a marine gastropod mollusk in the family Pisaniidae.

== Description ==
The length of the shell of the holotype attains 9.6 mm.

(Original description in Latin) The shell is small and ovate-oblong in shape, being transversely striated and longitudinally, though obsoletely, costulate. It is subnodulous in its texture and is encircled by alternating bands of white and black. Additionally, the spire is distinctly exserted.

This species is white. The spiral zones are black and may be interrupted by white nodules. The aperture is mauve or dark reddish-brown. The siphonal canal has short wavy lines.

== Distribution ==
This marine species occurs in the Indo-West Pacific; also off the Philippines, Thailand, Vanuatu and Australia (New South Wales, Queensland).
