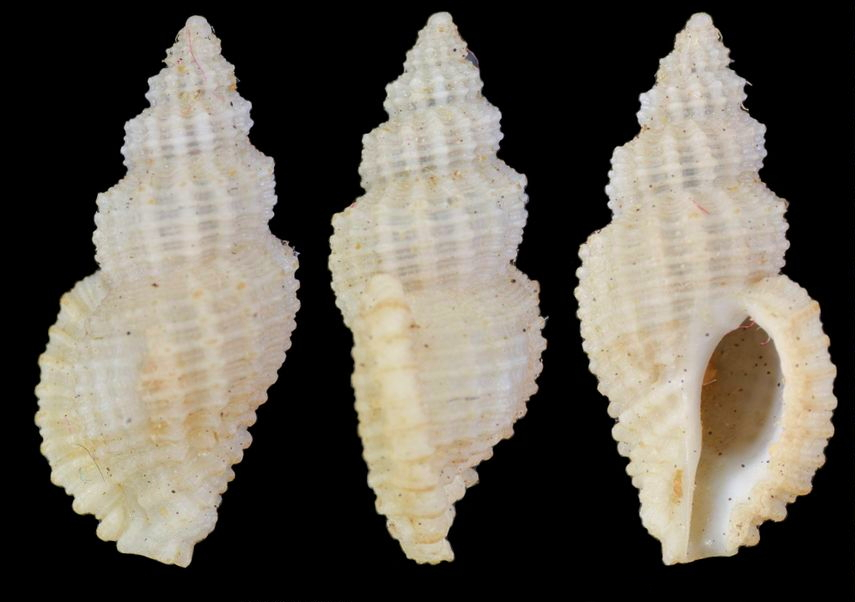
- Shell of Monostiolum rosewateri (holotype at the Smithsonian Institution)

Scientific classification
- Kingdom: Animalia
- Phylum: Mollusca
- Class: Gastropoda
- Subclass: Caenogastropoda
- Order: Neogastropoda
- Family: Pisaniidae
- Genus: Monostiolum; Dall, 1904

Type species
- Triton swifti Tryon, 1881

Synonyms
- Bailya (Bailya) M. Smith, 1944· alternative representation; Bailya (Parabailya) Watters & Finlay, 1989; Caducifer (Monostiolum); Colubraria (Monostiolum) Dall, 1904 (original rank)

= Monostiolum =

Genus of gastropods

Monostiolum is a genus of sea snails, marine gastropod mollusks in the family Pisaniidae.

== General characteristics ==
(Original description) The shell is small, with an elevated spire and a single terminal varix. The nucleus bears a protoconch that is immersed in the first nepionic whorl, leaving a distinct apical pit. The subsequent whorls are axially ribbed, although the ribs become obsolete on the later whorls of the adult shell. The coloration is similar to that of Colubraria s. s., and the sutures are appressed. The operculum is elongate-ovate and has an apical nucleus.

The animal has slender tentacles, with the eyes prominently situated on their outer bases. The verge is sickle-shaped and recurved over the back of the neck. The radula is long and bears teeth closely resembling those of Pisania maculosa (Lamarck, 1822) (synonym of Pisania striata (Gmelin, 1791))> and Pisania fusiformis (Blainville, 1932) (synonym of Solenosteira fusiformis (Blainville, 1832)). The dental formula is 1/3 1/3 1/3, and the base of the rachidian tooth is not excavated anteriorly.

== Species ==
Species within the genus Monostiolum include:

- Monostiolum atlanticum (Coelho, Matthews & Cardoso, 1970)
- Monostiolum auratum Watters & Finlay, 1989
- Monostiolum crebristriatus (Carpenter, 1856)
- Monostiolum fumosum Watters, 2009
- Monostiolum harryleei Garcia, 2006
- † Monostiolum heatherae Petuch, 1994
- † Monostiolum hungaricum (Csepreghy-Meznerics, 1954)
- Monostiolum nocturnum Watters, 2009
- Monostiolum pictum (Reeve, 1844)
- Monostiolum rosewateri Watters & Finlay, 1989
- Monostiolum simonei Watters, 2016
- Monostiolum tessellatum (Reeve, 1844)
- † Monostiolum varians (Michelotti, 1847)

Species brought into synonymy

- Monostiolum nigricostatum (Reeve, 1846): synonym of Sinetectula nigricostata (Reeve, 1846) (superseded combination
- Monostiolum weberi (Watters, 1983): synonym of Bailya weberi (Watters, 1983)
