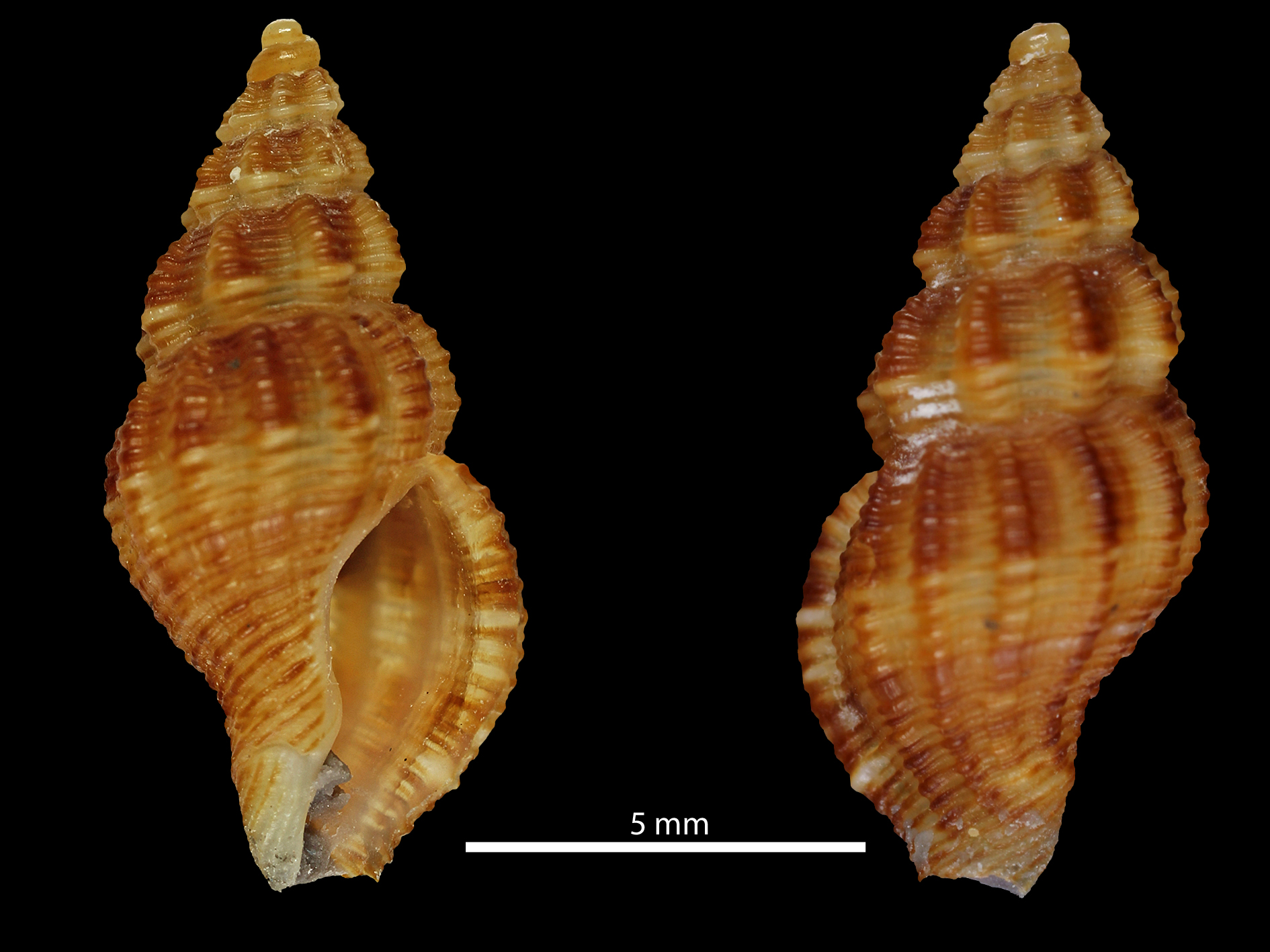
- Shell of Ameranna capixaba (paratype at MNHN, Paris)

Scientific classification
- Kingdom: Animalia
- Phylum: Mollusca
- Class: Gastropoda
- Subclass: Caenogastropoda
- Order: Neogastropoda
- Family: Pisaniidae
- Genus: Ameranna
- Species: A. capixaba

Binomial name
- Ameranna capixaba (Coltro & Dornellas, 2013)

Synonyms
- Anna capixaba Coltro & Dornellas, 2013 (original combination)

= Ameranna capixaba =

Species of gastropod

Ameranna capixaba is a species of sea snail, a marine gastropod mollusc in the family Pisaniidae. It occurs off Espírito Santo in southeastern Brazil, at depths of 45–60 m.
