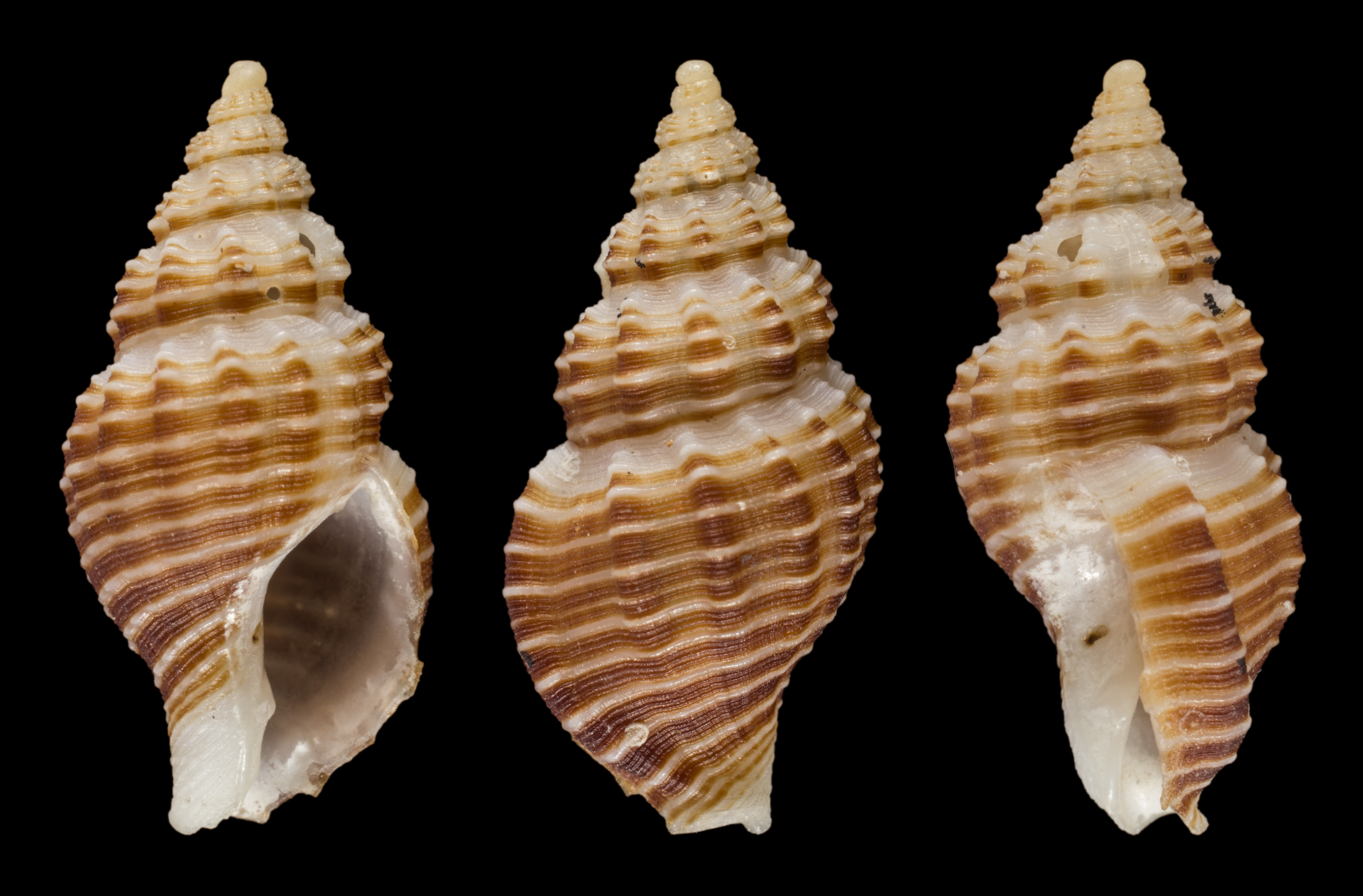
- Shell of Micrologus mochatinctus (holotype at MNHN, Paris)

Scientific classification
- Kingdom: Animalia
- Phylum: Mollusca
- Class: Gastropoda
- Subclass: Caenogastropoda
- Order: Neogastropoda
- Superfamily: Buccinoidea
- Family: Pisaniidae
- Genus: Micrologus; Fraussen & Rosado, 2011

Type species
- Micrologus mochatinctus Fraussen & Rosado, 2011

= Micrologus (gastropod) =

Genus of gastropods

Micrologus is a genus of sea snails, marine gastropod mollusks in the family Pisaniidae.

== Species ==
Species within the genus Micrologus include:

- Micrologus mochatinctus Fraussen & Rosado, 2011
