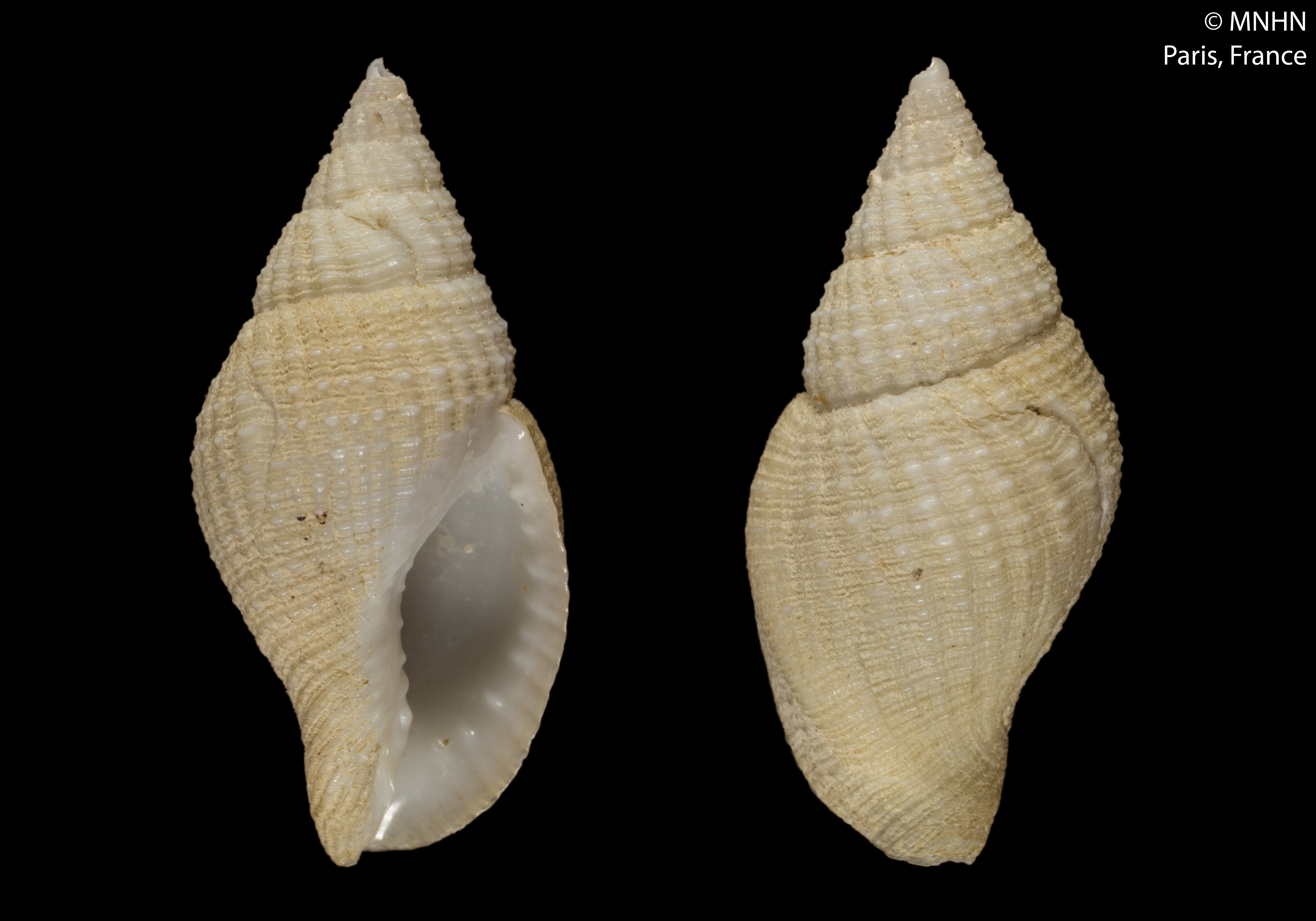
- Cancellopollia gracilis

Scientific classification
- Kingdom: Animalia
- Phylum: Mollusca
- Class: Gastropoda
- Subclass: Caenogastropoda
- Order: Neogastropoda
- Superfamily: Buccinoidea
- Family: Pisaniidae
- Genus: Cancellopollia; Vermeij & Bouchet, 1998

Type species
- Cancellopollia gracilis Vermeij & Bouchet, 1998

= Cancellopollia =

Genus of gastropods

Cancellopollia is a genus of sea snails, marine gastropod mollusks in the family Pisaniidae.

== Species ==
Species within the genus Cancellopollia include:

- Cancellopollia gracilis Vermeij & Bouchet, 1998
- Cancellopollia insculpta (Sowerby III, 1900)
- Cancellopollia ustulata Vermeij & Bouchet, 1998
