= Ameranna royalensis =

Scientific classification
- Kingdom: Animalia
- Phylum: Mollusca
- Class: Gastropoda
- Subclass: Caenogastropoda
- Order: Neogastropoda
- Family: Pisaniidae
- Genus: Ameranna
- Species: A. royalensis

Binomial name
- Ameranna royalensis (Watters, 2009)

Synonyms
- Anna royalensis Watters, 2009 (basionym)

Species of gastropod

Ameranna royalensis is a species of sea snail, a marine gastropod mollusk in the family Pisaniidae.
