= Ecmanis =

Scientific classification
- Kingdom: Animalia
- Phylum: Mollusca
- Class: Gastropoda
- Subclass: Caenogastropoda
- Order: Neogastropoda
- Family: Pisaniidae
- Genus: Ecmanis; Gistel, 1848

Type species
- Buccinum igneum Gmelin, 1791

Synonyms
- Proboscidea Möller, 1832 (non Proboscidea Bruguière, 1791; Ecmanis is a replacement name)

Genus of gastropods

Ecmanis is a genus of sea snails, marine gastropod mollusks in the family Pisaniidae.

== Species ==
Species within the genus Ecmanis include:

- Ecmanis ignea (Gmelin, 1791)
