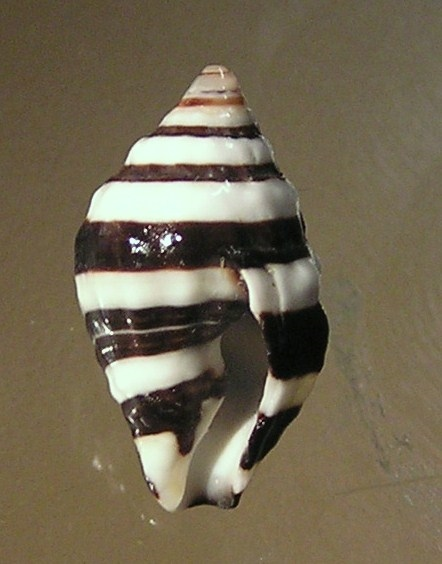
- Engina mendicaria

Scientific classification
- Kingdom: Animalia
- Phylum: Mollusca
- Class: Gastropoda
- Subclass: Caenogastropoda
- Order: Neogastropoda
- Superfamily: Buccinoidea
- Family: Pisaniidae
- Genus: Engina; Gray, 1839

Type species
- Engina zonata Gray, 1839

Synonyms
- Columbella (Engina) J. E. Gray, 1839 superseded rank; Gorgina Preston, 1909 (Not an available name: Incorrect subsequent spelling of Engina Gray, 1839); Pollia (Engina) J. E. Gray, 1839 superseded rank; Pusiostoma Swainson, 1840

= Engina =

Genus of gastropods

Engina is a genus of sea snails, marine gastropod mollusks in the family Pisaniidae.

== Species ==
Species within the genus Engina include:

- Engina albocincta Pease, 1860
- Engina alveolata (Kiener, 1836)
- Engina androyensis Fraussen, Monnier & Rosado, 2015
- Engina annae Watters & Fraussen, 2015
- Engina armillata (Reeve, 1846)
- Engina astricta (Reeve, 1846)
- Engina australis (Pease, 1871)
- Engina bonasia Martens, 1880
- † Engina brunettii Landau, Ceulemans & Van Dingenen, 2019
- † Engina cantaurana Landau & Vermeij, 2012
- Engina chinoi Fraussen, 2009
- Engina concinna (Reeve, 1846)
- Engina corinnae Crovo, 1971
- Engina cronuchorda Fraussen & Chino, 2011
- Engina cumingiana Melvill, 1895
- Engina curtisiana (E.A. Smith, 1884)
- Engina demani De Jong & Coomans, 1988
- Engina epidromidea Melvill, 1894
- Engina fasciata (Bozzetti, 2009)
- Engina frausseni Chino, 2015
- Engina fuscolineata E. A. Smith, 1913
- Engina fusiformis Pease, 1865
- Engina goncalvesi Coltro, 2005
- Engina ignicula Fraussen, 2004
- Engina itzamnai (Watters, 2009)
- Engina lanceolata (Kuroda & Habe, 1971)
- Engina lauta (Reeve, 1846)
- Engina layardi Melvill, 1895
- Engina lignea Watters & Fraussen, 2015
- Engina lineata (Reeve, 1846)
- Engina livida (G.B. Sowerby I, 1832)
- Engina macleani Olsson, 1971
- Engina magnifica Fraussen, Monnier & Rosado, 2015
- Engina mandarinoides Fraussen & Chino, 2011
- Engina mantensis Bartsch, 1928
- Engina maura (G.B. Sowerby I, 1832)
- Engina melanozona Tomlin, 1928
- Engina mendicaria (Linnaeus, 1758)
- Engina menkeana (Dunker, 1860)
- Engina mirabilis Fraussen & Stahlschmidt, 2015
- † Engina moinensis Landau & Vermeij, 2012
- Engina mundula Melvill & Standen, 1885
- Engina muznoides Fraussen & Van Laethem, 2013
- Engina natalensis Melvill, 1895
- Engina notabilis Fraussen & Chino, 2011
- Engina obliquecostata (Reeve, 1846)
- Engina ovata Pease, 1865
- Engina permixta Watters & Fraussen, 2015
- Engina phasinola (Duclos, 1840)
- Engina polychloros (Tapparone-Canefri, 1880)
- Engina pulchra (Reeve, 1846):
- Engina pyrostoma (G.B. Sowerby I, 1832)
- Engina reevei Tryon, 1883
- Engina resta (Iredale, 1940)
- Engina ryalli Rolan & Fernandes, 1995
- Engina siderea (Reeve, 1846)
- Engina solida Dall, 1917
- Engina spica Melvill & Standen, 1895
- Engina strongi Pilsbry & Lowe, 1932
- Engina tabogaensis Bartsch, 1931
- Engina tuberculosa Pease, 1862
- Engina turbinella (Kiener, 1836)
- Engina williamsae Watters & Fraussen, 2015
- Engina zea Melvill, 1893
- Engina zepa (Duclos, 1883)
- Engina zonalis (Lamarck, 1822)

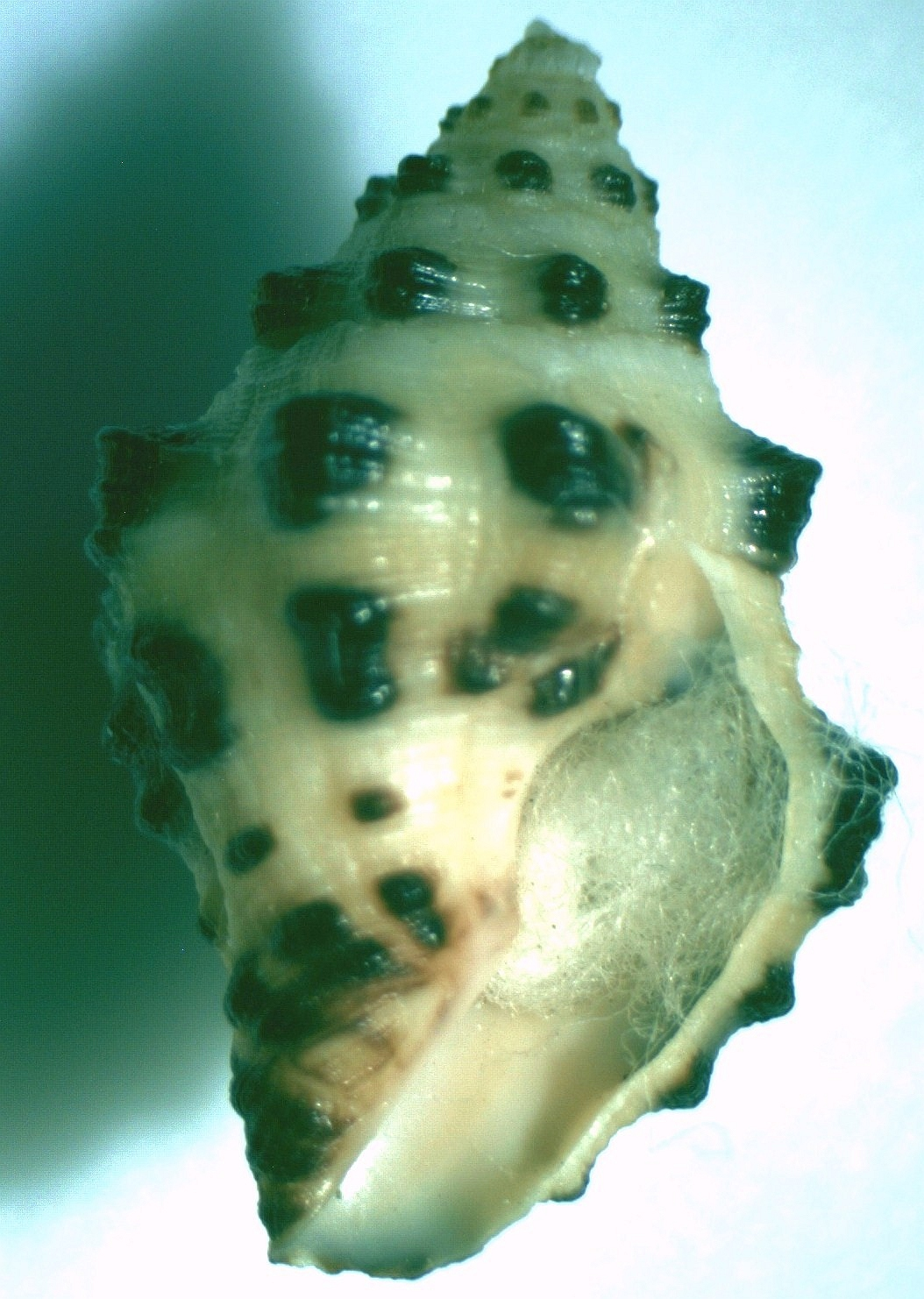
Engina pyrostoma

The Indo- Pacific Molluscan Database also includes the following names in current use

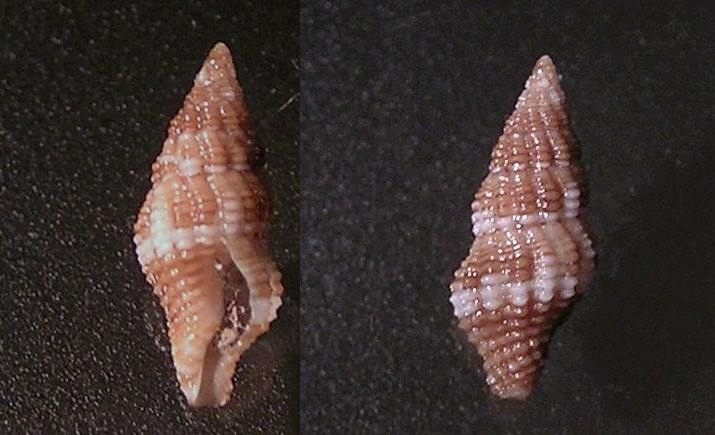
Engina menkeana

- Engina idosia (Duckos in Chenu, 1848 in 1843–53)

Taxon inquirendum

- Engina anakisia (Duclos, 1850)

Nomen dubium

- Engina leucozonia A. H. Verrill, 1950

Species brought into synonymy

- Engina angulata G. B. Sowerby III, 1888: synonym of Peristernia angulata (G. B. Sowerby III, 1888)
- Engina bicolor (Cantraine, 1835): synonym of Enginella leucozona (Philippi, 1844)
- Engina cinis (Reeve, 1846): synonym of Sinetectula cinis (Reeve, 1846) (a junior synonym)
- Engina contracta (Reeve, 1846): synonym of Clivipollia contracta (Reeve, 1846)
- Engina costata Pease, 1860: synonym of Clivipollia costata (Pease, 1860) (original combination)
- Engina demanorum De Jong & Coomans, 1988: synonym of Engina demani De Jong & Coomans, 1988 (unjustified emendation)
- Engina dicksoni Petuch, 2013: synonym of Engina itzamnai (Watters, 2009)
- Engina egregia (Reeve, 1844): synonym of Sinetectula cinis (Reeve, 1846) (a junior synonym)
- Engina farinosa (Gould, 1850): synonym of Sinetectula carduus (Reeve, 1844) (junior subjective synonym)
- Engina fragaria (W. Wood, 1828): synonym of Clivipollia fragaria (W. Wood, 1828)
- Engina gannita Hedley, 1914: synonym of Clivipollia contracta (Reeve, 1846)
- Engina gibbosa Garrett, 1872: synonym of Clivipollia recurva (Reeve, 1846)
- Engina histrio (Reeve, 1846): synonym of Engina alveolata (Kiener, 1836)
- Engina incarnata (Deshayes, 1834): synonym of Turbinella incarnata Deshayes, 1833
- Engina janowskyi Coltro, 2005: synonym of Engina demani De Jong & Coomans, 1988
- Engina jugosa (C. B. Adams, 1852): synonym of Hesperisternia jugosa (C. B. Adams, 1852)
- Engina leucozona (Philippi, 1843): synonym of Enginella leucozona (Philippi, 1843)
- Engina mactanensis Cernohorsky, 1985: synonym of Engina spica Melvill & Standen, 1895
- Engina monilifera Pease, 1860: synonym of Morula echinata (Reeve, 1846)
- Engina nodicostata Pease, 1868: synonym of Morula nodicostata (Pease, 1868)
- Engina nodulosa Pease, 1869: synonym of Orania nodulosa (Pease, 1869)
- Engina papuensis (Tapparone Canefri, 1879): synonym of Clivipollia pulchra (Reeve, 1846)
- Engina parva Pease, 1868: synonym of Morula cernohorskyi Houart & Tröndle, 1997
- Engina paulucciae (Tapparone Canefri, 1879): synonym of Clivipollia incarnata (Deshayes, 1834)
- Engina perlata (Küster, 1858): synonym of Engina natalensis Melvill, 1895
- Engina purpureocincta Preston, 1909: synonym of Oppomorus purpureocinctus (Preston, 1909)
- Engina rawsoni (Melvill, 1897): synonym of Pollia rawsoni (Melvill, 1897)
- Engina reevei Tryon, 1923: synonym of Engina alveolata (Kiener, 1836)
- Engina schrammi Crosse, 1863: synonym of Muricopsis schrammi (Crosse, 1863)
- Engina senae Pilsbry & Lowe, 1932: synonym of Engina solida (Dall, 1917)
- Engina slootsi De Jong & Coomans, 1988: synonym of Morula biconica (Blainville, 1832)
- Engina striata Pease, 1868: synonym of Morula striata (Pease, 1868)
- Engina trifasciata L. A. Reeve, 1846: synonym of Engina alveolata (Kiener, 1835)
- Engina variabilis Pease, 1868: synonym of Morula variabilis (Pease, 1868)
- Engina willemsae De Jong & Coomans, 1988: synonym of Ameranna willemsae (De Jong & Coomans, 1988)
- Engina xantholeuca G. B. Sowerby III, 1882: synonym of Morula dichrous (Tapparone Canefri, 1880)
- Engina zatricium Melvill, 1893: synonym of Engina bonasia (Martens, 1880)
- Engina zonata Reeve: synonym of Engina turbinella (Kiener, 1836)
