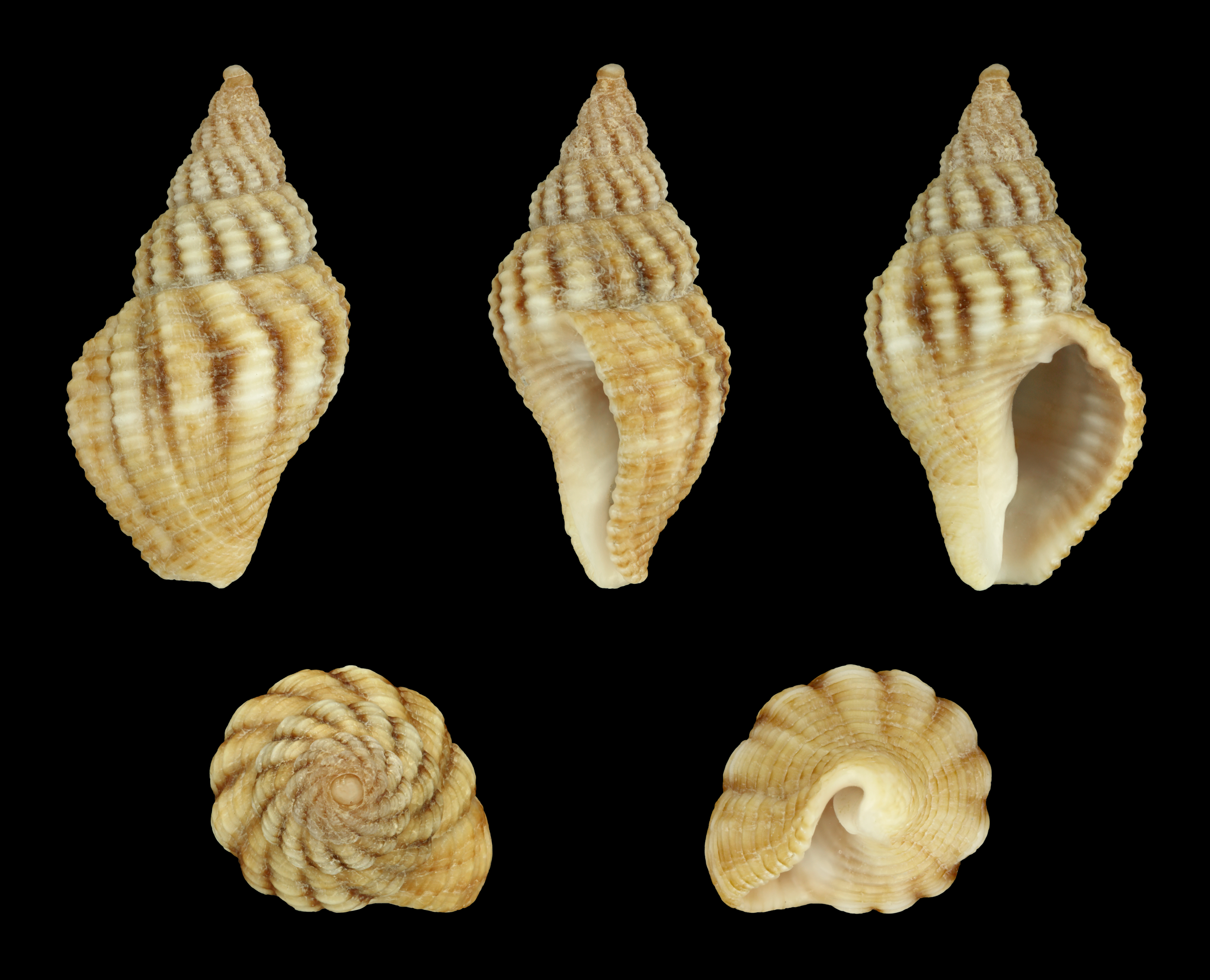
- Aplus assimilis shell

Scientific classification
- Kingdom: Animalia
- Phylum: Mollusca
- Class: Gastropoda
- Subclass: Caenogastropoda
- Order: Neogastropoda
- Superfamily: Buccinoidea
- Family: Pisaniidae; Gray, 1857

Synonyms
- Pisaniinae Gray, 1857; Pusiostomatidae Iredale, 1940

= Pisaniidae =

Family of gastropods

The Pisaniidae are a taxonomic family of medium-sized sea snails, marine gastropod mollusks in the superfamily Buccinoidea.

== General characteristics ==
The shell is small to medium in size, measuring 10–50 mm, and ranges in shape from fusiform-ovate to elongately fusiform. Its surface may be smooth or variously sculptured with spiral threads, cords, axial striae, or granules. The aperture is narrow, taking an elliptical to fusiform form, while the outer lip is often externally thickened by a varix and internally smooth or finely denticulate. The columella is calloused, and the parietal wall may bear a distinct denticle or remain smooth; in some cases, denticles extend along the entire length of the columella. The anterior end of the columella frequently forms an angular projection. Labial denticles may continue for a short distance into the aperture, and the siphonal canal is moderately short but clearly distinct.

The radula of the Pisaniidae consists of square to shortly rectangular rachidian teeth bearing three to five cusps; in some species, these cusps are reduced or obsolete and are represented instead by axially incised, blunt denticles.

The operculum is corneous and possesses a basal nucleus.

== Genera ==
- Ameranna Landau & Vermeij, 2012
- † Anna Risso, 1826 (nomen dubium)
- Aplus De Gregorio, 1885
- Bailya M. Smith, 1944
- Cancellopollia Vermeij & Bouchet, 1998
- Cantharus Röding, 1798
- Dianthiphos Watters, 2009
- Ecmanis Gistel, 1848
- † Editharus Vermeij 2001
- † Endopachychilus Cossmann, 1889
- Engina Gray, 1839
- † Eocantharus B. L. Clark, 1938
- † Eopreangeria Banerjee & Halder, 2024
- Enginella Monterosato, 1917
- Gemophos Olsson & Harbison, 1953
- Hesperisternia J. Gardner, 1944
- † Ickarus Vermeij, 2001
- † Janiopsis Rovereto, 1899
- Micrologus Fraussen & Rosado, 2011
- Monostiolum Dall, 1904
- Pisania Bivona-Bernardi, 1832
- Pollia Gray, 1834
- Pusio Gray, 1833
- † Samudra Beets, 1987
- Sinetectula Fraussen & Vermeij, 2021
- Solenosteira Dall, 1890
- Steye Faber, 2004
- Triumphis J. E. Gray, 1857
