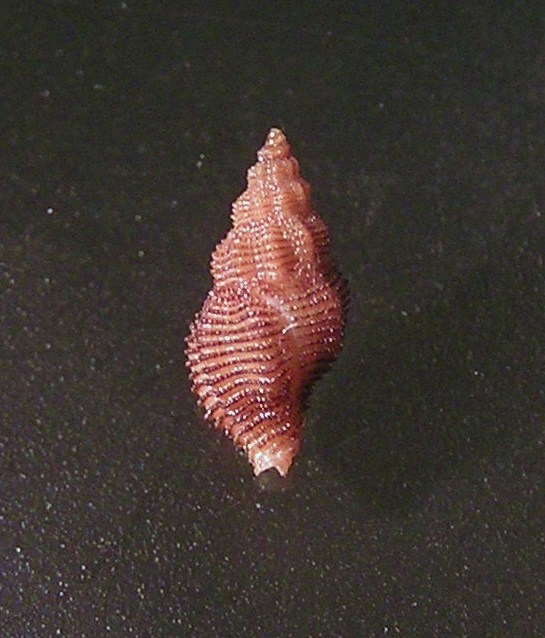
- shell of Orania walkeri

Scientific classification
- Kingdom: Animalia
- Phylum: Mollusca
- Class: Gastropoda
- Subclass: Caenogastropoda
- Order: Neogastropoda
- Superfamily: Muricoidea
- Family: Muricidae
- Subfamily: Ergalataxinae
- Genus: Orania; Pallary, 1900

Type species
- Murex spadae Libassi, 1859

Synonyms
- Lataxiena (Orania); Pseudomurex (Orania) Pallary, 1900 (original rank as subgenus)

= Orania (gastropod) =

Genus of gastropods

Orania is a genus of sea snails, marine gastropod mollusks in the subfamily Ergalataxinae of the family Muricidae, the murex snails or rock snails.

== Species ==
Species within the genus Orania include:

- Orania adiastolos Houart, 1995
- Orania archaea Houart, 1995
- Orania atea Houart & Tröndlé, 2008
- Orania badia (Reeve, 1845)
- Orania bimucronata (Reeve, 1846)
- Orania birileffi (Lischke, 1871)
- Orania carnicolor (Bozzetti, 2009)
- Orania castanea (Küster, 1859)
- † Orania cheilotoma (Hoernes & Auinger, 1890)
- Orania corallina (Melvill & Standen, 1903)
- Orania dharmai Houart, 1995
- Orania ficula (Reeve 1848)
- Orania fischeriana (Tapparone-Canefri, 1882)
- Orania fusulus (Brocchi, 1814)
- Orania gaskelli (Melvill, 1891)
- Orania livida (Reeve, 1846)
- Orania maestratii Houart & Tröndlé, 2008
- Orania mixta (Houart, 1995)
- Orania nodosa (Hombron & Jacquinot, 1841)
- Orania nodulosa (Pease, 1869)
- Orania pachyraphe (E. A. Smith, 1879)
- Orania pacifica (Nakayama, 1988)
- Orania pholidota (Watson, 1883)
- Orania pleurotomoides (Reeve, 1845)
- Orania pseudopacifica Houart, Zuccon & Puillandre, 2019
- Orania purpurea (Kuroda & Habe, 1961)
- Orania rosadoi Houart, 1998
- Orania rosea Houart, 1996
- Orania serotina (A. Adams, 1853)
- Orania simonetae Houart, 1995
- Orania subnodulosa (Melvill, 1893)
- Orania taeniata Houart, 1995
- Orania taiwana (K.-Y. Lai & B.-S. Jung, 2012)
- † Orania turrita (Borson, 1821)
- Orania walkeri (G.B. Sowerby III, 1908)
- Orania xuthedra (Melvill, 1893)

Species brought into synonymy

- Orania albozonata (E. A. Smith, 1890): synonym of Enginella albozonata (E. A. Smith, 1890)
- Orania alexanderi Houart, 1985: synonym of Orania xuthedra (Melvill, 1893)
- Orania birileffi (Lischke, 1871): synonym of Bedevina birileffi (Lischke, 1871)
- Orania grayi (Dall, 1889): synonym of Cytharomorula grayi (Dall, 1889)
- Orania infans (E. A. Smith, 1884): synonym of Spinidrupa infans (E. A. Smith, 1884)
- Orania ornamentata Houart, 1995: synonym of Cytharomorula ornamentata (Houart, 1995) (original combination)
