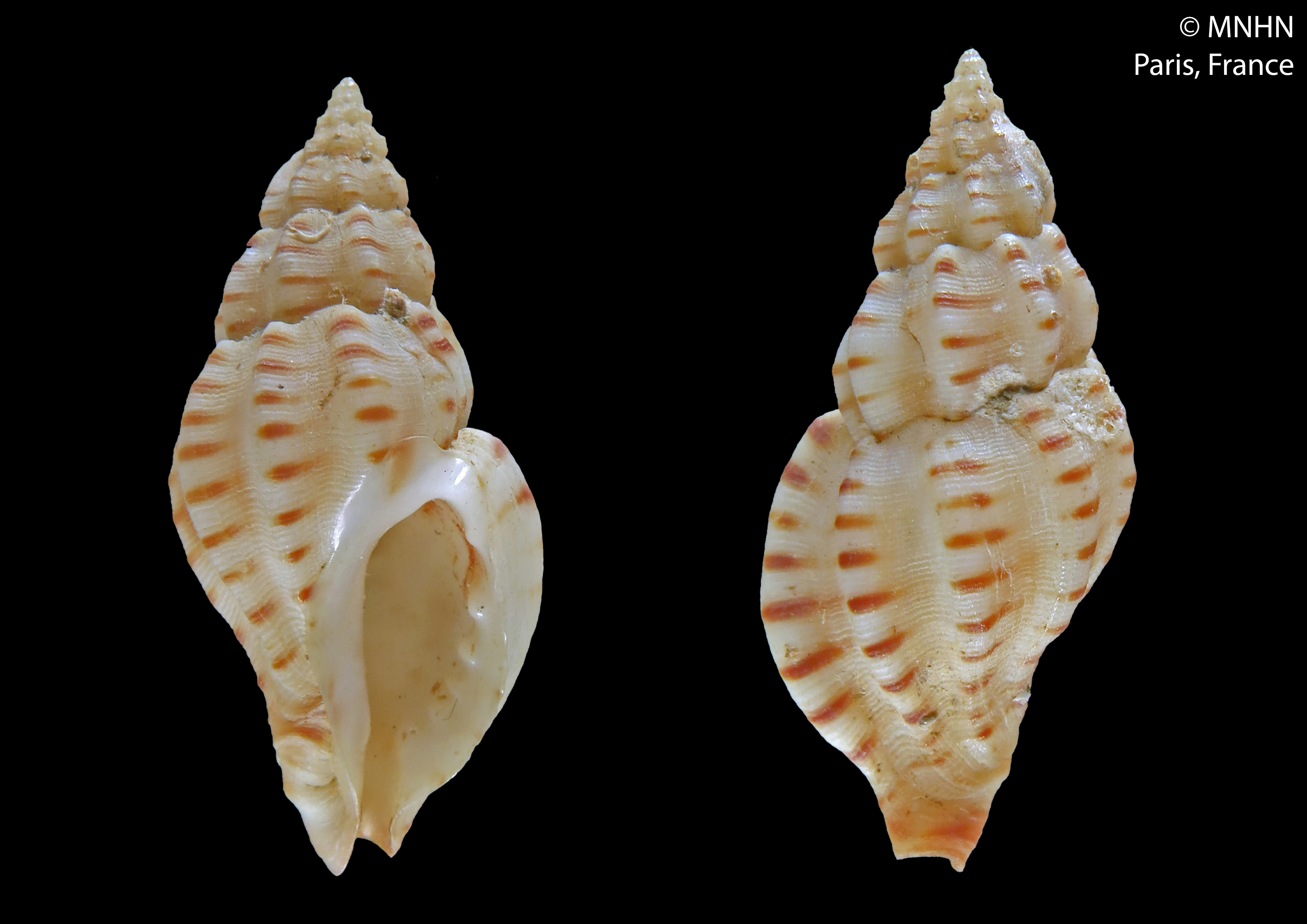
- Shell of Cytharomorula vexillum (specimen at MNHN, Paris)

Scientific classification
- Kingdom: Animalia
- Phylum: Mollusca
- Class: Gastropoda
- Subclass: Caenogastropoda
- Order: Neogastropoda
- Superfamily: Muricoidea
- Family: Muricidae
- Subfamily: Ergalataxinae
- Genus: Cytharomorula; Kuroda, 1953

Type species
- Cytharomorula vexillum Kuroda, 1953

= Cytharomorula =

Genus of gastropods

Cytharomorula is a genus of sea snails, marine gastropod mollusks in the family Muricidae, the murex snails or rock snails.

== Species ==
Species within the genus Cytharomorula include:

- Cytharomorula absidata Houart, Zuccon & Puillandre, 2019
- Cytharomorula ambonensis (Houart, 1996)
- Cytharomorula arta Houart, Zuccon & Puillandre, 2019
- Cytharomorula benedicta (Melvill & Standen, 1895)
- Cytharomorula danigoi Houart, 1995
- Cytharomorula dollfusi (Lamy, 1938)
- Cytharomorula elegantula Houart, Zuccon & Puillandre, 2019
- Cytharomorula fatuhivaensis Houart, Zuccon & Puillandre, 2019
- Cytharomorula grayi (Dall, 1889)
- Cytharomorula lefevreiana (Tapparone-Canefri, 1880)
- Cytharomorula manusuduirauti Houart, Zuccon & Puillandre, 2019
- Cytharomorula ornamentata (Houart, 1995)
- Cytharomorula paucimaculata (Sowerby III, 1903)
- Cytharomorula pinguis Houart, 1995
- Cytharomorula severnsi Houart, 2020
- Cytharomorula springsteeni Houart, 1995
- Cytharomorula vexillum Kuroda, 1953

Species brought into synonymy

- Cytharomorula pleurotomoides (Reeve, 1845): synonym of Orania pleurotomoides (Reeve, 1845)
