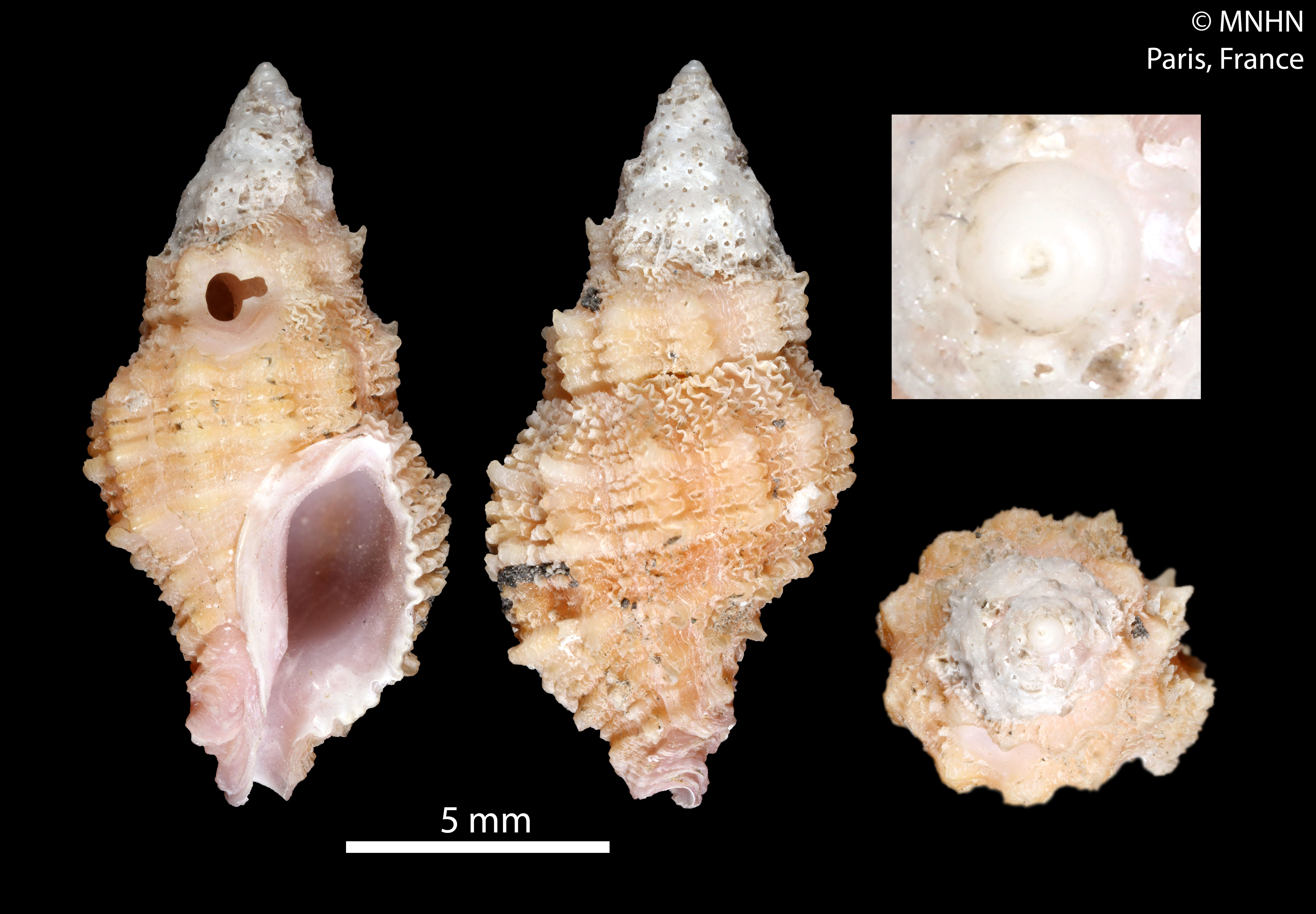
- Shell of Orania rosea (paratype at MNHN, Paris)

Scientific classification
- Kingdom: Animalia
- Phylum: Mollusca
- Class: Gastropoda
- Subclass: Caenogastropoda
- Order: Neogastropoda
- Family: Muricidae
- Genus: Orania
- Species: O. rosea

Binomial name
- Orania rosea Houart, 1996

Synonyms
- Murex radula Hedley, 1899 (invalid: junior homonym of Murex radula Linnaeus, 1758)

= Orania rosea =

Species of gastropod

Orania rosea is a species of sea snail, a marine gastropod mollusk in the family Muricidae, the murex snails or rock snails.

== Distribution ==
This species occurs in the Indian Ocean off Réunion.
