= Orania livida =

Scientific classification
- Kingdom: Animalia
- Phylum: Mollusca
- Class: Gastropoda
- Subclass: Caenogastropoda
- Order: Neogastropoda
- Family: Muricidae
- Genus: Orania
- Species: O. livida

Binomial name
- Orania livida (Reeve, 1846)

Synonyms
- Buccinum lividum Reeve, 1846

Species of gastropod

Orania livida is a species of sea snail, a marine gastropod mollusc in the family Muricidae, the murex snails or rock snails.
