= Orania fusulus =

Scientific classification
- Kingdom: Animalia
- Phylum: Mollusca
- Class: Gastropoda
- Subclass: Caenogastropoda
- Order: Neogastropoda
- Family: Muricidae
- Genus: Orania
- Species: O. fusulus

Binomial name
- Orania fusulus (Brocchi, 1814)

Synonyms
- Coralliophila (Coralliophila) spadae Libassi, I., 1859; Murex fusulus Brocchi, 1814; Murex pyrrhias Watson, 1883; Murex spadae tiberiana Brusina, S., 1871; Muricopsis angolensis (Odhner, 1922); Ocenebra angolensis Odhner, 1922; Orania angolensis Odhner, N.H.J., 1922; Orania spadae elongatus Pallary, P. in Settepassi, F., 1977; Orania spadae major Pallary, P., 1900; Orania spadae minor Pallary, P., 1900; Orania spadae obesa Pallary, P., 1900; Orania spadae robustus Settepassi, F., 1977; Pollia fusulus (Brocchi, 1814); Pollia fusulus major Locard, 1897; Pseudomurex spadae elongatus Pallary, 1900 in Settepassi, 1977; Pseudomurex spadae major Pallary, 1900; Pseudomurex spadae minor Pallary, 1900; Pseudomurex spadae obesa Pallary, 1900; Pseudomurex spadae robustus Settepassi, 1977

Species of gastropod

Orania fusulus, common name: the spindle dwarf triton, is a species of sea snail, a marine gastropod mollusk in the family Muricidae, the murex snails or rock snails.

== Description ==
The shell varies between 10 mm and 22 mm.

== Distribution ==
This species is distributed in Western European waters, the Mediterranean Sea and in the Atlantic Ocean along Angola and Brazil.
