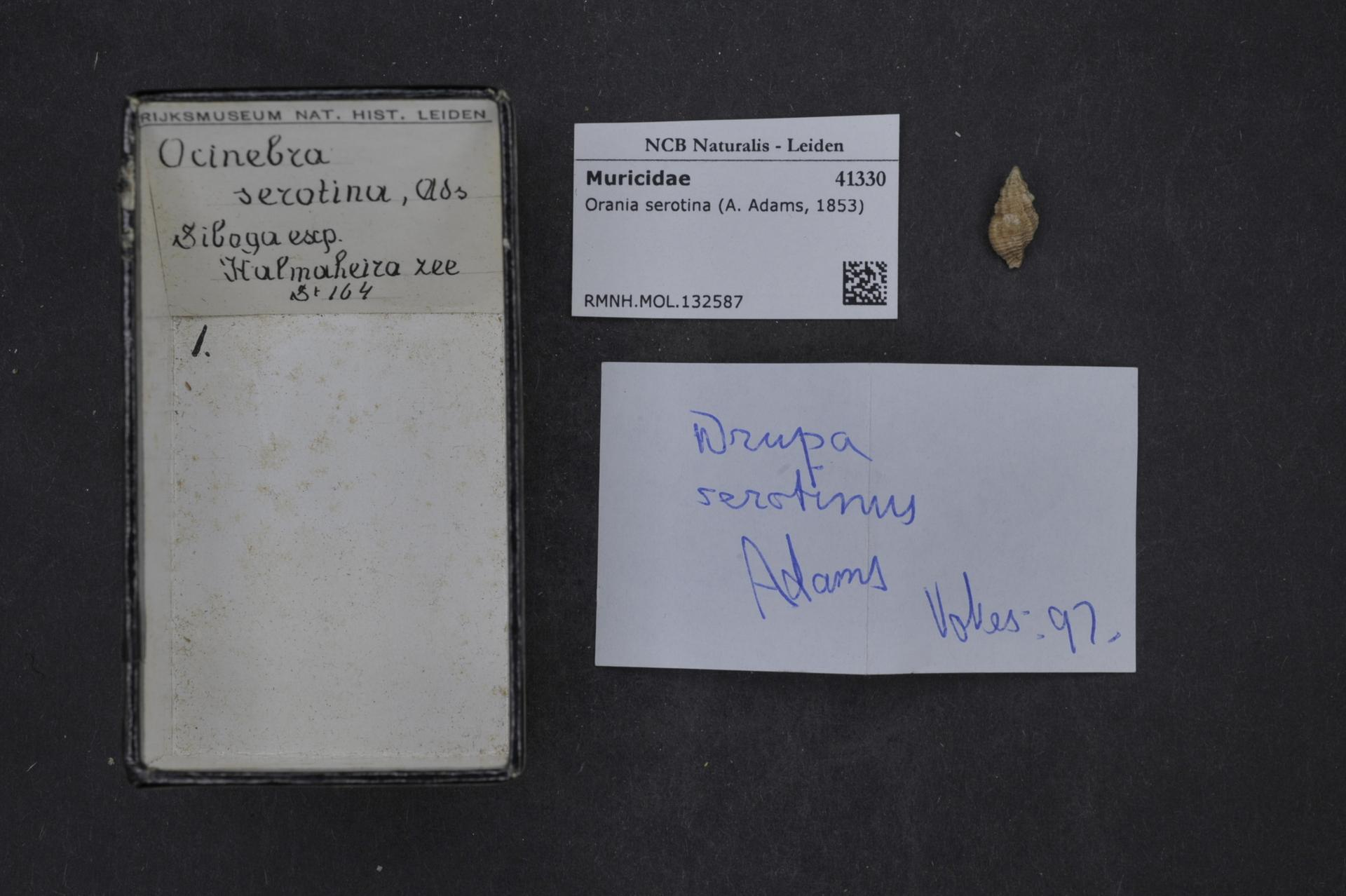
- Orania serotina

Scientific classification
- Kingdom: Animalia
- Phylum: Mollusca
- Class: Gastropoda
- Subclass: Caenogastropoda
- Order: Neogastropoda
- Family: Muricidae
- Genus: Orania
- Species: O. serotina

Binomial name
- Orania serotina (A. Adams, 1853)

Synonyms
- Morula squamilirata (E.A. Smith, 1903); Murex serotinus A. Adams, 1853 (basionym); Sistrum squamiliratum E.A. Smith, 1903

= Orania serotina =

Species of marine gastropod

Orania serotina is a species of sea snail, a marine gastropod mollusk in the family Muricidae, the murex snails or rock snails.

== Distribution ==
This species is distributed in the Indian Ocean along the Aldabra Atoll
