= Cytharomorula danigoi =

Scientific classification
- Kingdom: Animalia
- Phylum: Mollusca
- Class: Gastropoda
- Subclass: Caenogastropoda
- Order: Neogastropoda
- Family: Muricidae
- Genus: Cytharomorula
- Species: C. danigoi

Binomial name
- Cytharomorula danigoi Houart, 1995

Species of gastropod

Cytharomorula danigoi is a species of sea snail, a marine gastropod mollusk in the family Muricidae, the murex snails or rock snails.

== Description ==
The length of the shell attains 11.9 mm, which is noted to be relatively small for the genus. The aperture and siphonal canal are narrow. The colour is described as whitish to light brown; the aperture white.

== Distribution ==
This marine species occurs off New Caledonia.
