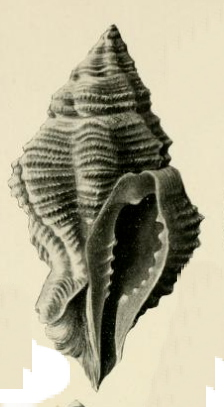
- Shell of Orania fischeriana (holotype)

Scientific classification
- Kingdom: Animalia
- Phylum: Mollusca
- Class: Gastropoda
- Subclass: Caenogastropoda
- Order: Neogastropoda
- Family: Muricidae
- Genus: Orania
- Species: O. fischeriana

Binomial name
- Orania fischeriana (Tapparone-Canefri, 1882)

Synonyms
- Latirus (Peristernia) fischerianus Tapparone-Canefri, 1882; Nassaria mordica Hedley, 1909

= Orania fischeriana =

Species of gastropod

Orania fischeriana is a species of sea snail, a marine gastropod mollusk in the family Muricidae, the murex snails or rock snails.

== Description ==
The length of the shell attains 16 mm; its diameter 8 mm.

The shell is of medium size, very solid, biconical, false umbilicate. Its colour is buff, the cords on the rib-summits of the periphery picked out with chocolate, the aperture flesh- tint. The shell contains seven whorls and a protoconch of three smooth whorls.

Sculpture : seven prominent oblique rounded ribs cross each whorl, and mount the spire continuously, the last forming a varix to the aperture. These are crossed by spiral cords, about fifteen to the body whorl and five to the penultimate whorl, two or three of the peripheral cords predominating over the rest. Across these run close fine radial laminae, puckered into imbricating scales on crossing the spirals.

The siphonal canal is open, short, recurved, the canal-tips of previous apertures enclosing with a frill a false umbilicus. The aperture is narrow-oval. On the right side there are seven evenly spaced entering ridges which penetrate a short distance only. Externally they end abruptly at a circumferential groove. Posteriorly the aperture ends in a furrow followed by a tubercle. The upper part of the inner lip is clear of obstructions, but the lower is occupied by five strong and deeply penetrating spiral ridges which do not reach the free edge of the columellar lip.

== Distribution ==
This marine species occurs off New Caledonia and Australia (Queensland).
