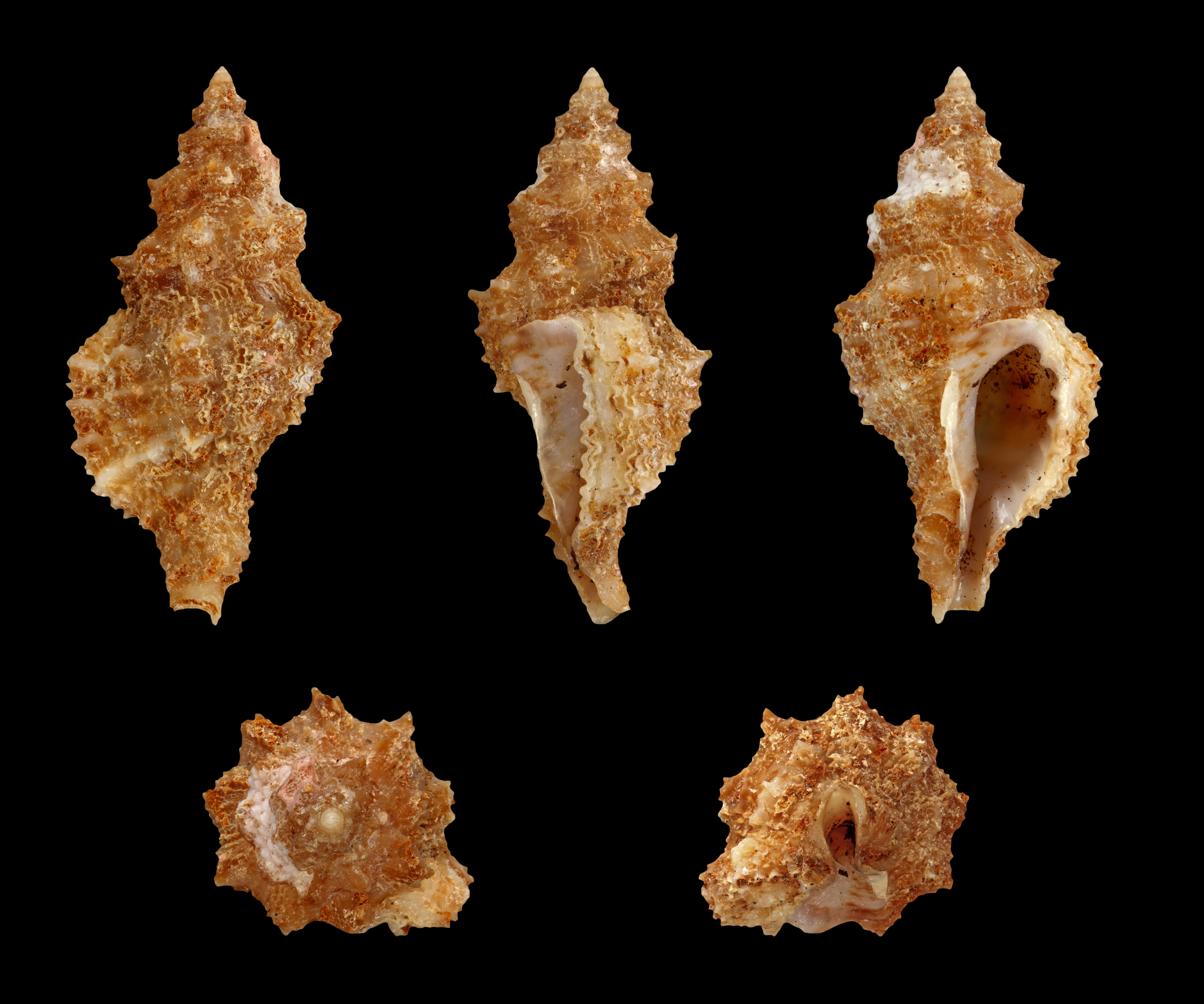

Scientific classification
- Kingdom: Animalia
- Phylum: Mollusca
- Class: Gastropoda
- Subclass: Caenogastropoda
- Order: Neogastropoda
- Family: Muricidae
- Genus: Orania
- Species: O. archaea

Binomial name
- Orania archaea Houart, 1995

= Orania archaea =

Species of gastropod

Orania archaea is a species of sea snail, a marine gastropod mollusk in the family Muricidae, the murex snails or rock snails.

Subspecies

- Orania archaea archaea Houart, 1995
- Orania archaea hitomiae Houart & Moe, 2011 (occurs off Oahu, Hawaii).

== Distribution ==
This marine species occurs off the Philippines.
