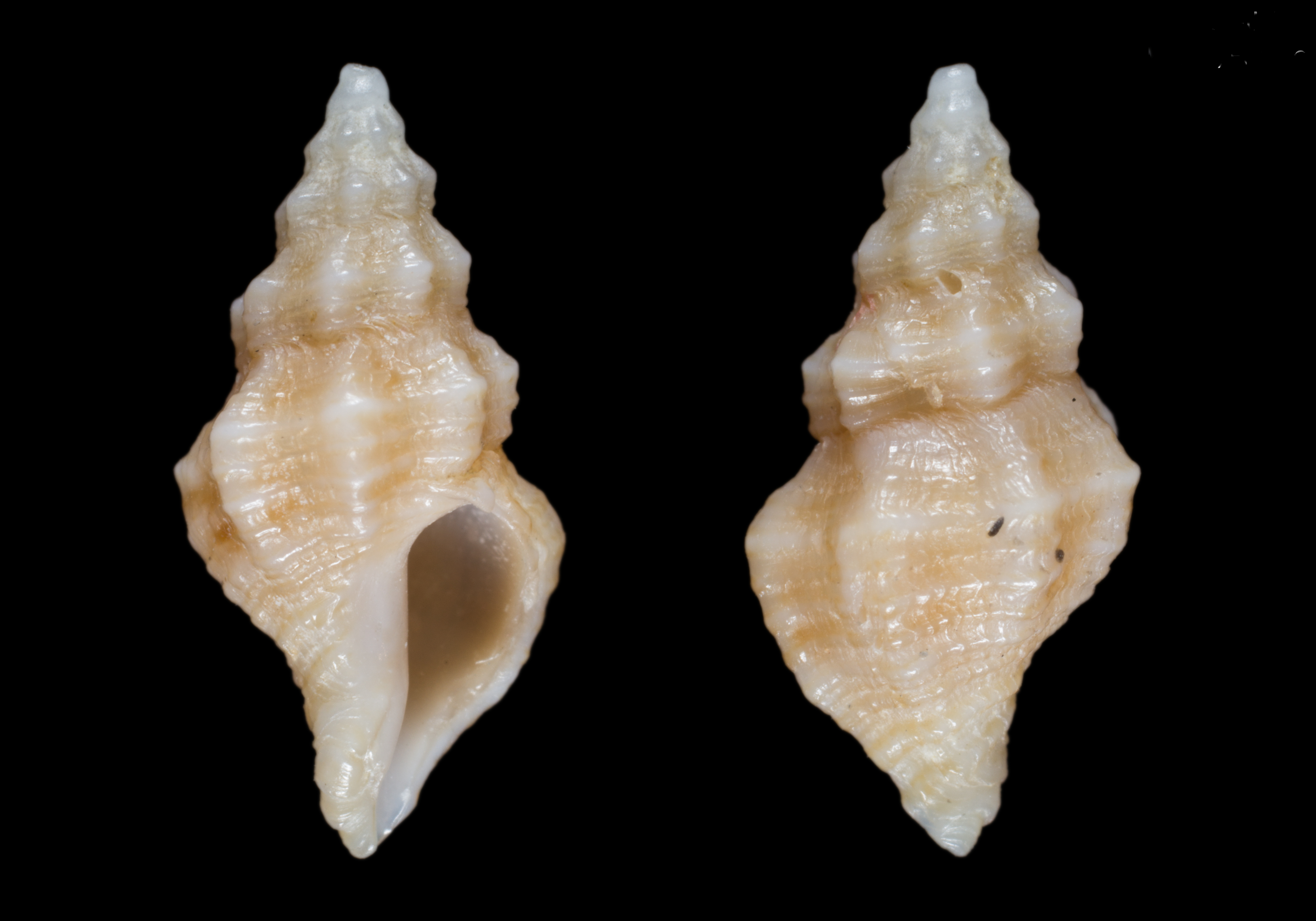
- Shell of Orania carnicolor (holotype in the MNHN, Paris)

Scientific classification
- Kingdom: Animalia
- Phylum: Mollusca
- Class: Gastropoda
- Subclass: Caenogastropoda
- Order: Neogastropoda
- Family: Muricidae
- Genus: Orania
- Species: O. carnicolor

Binomial name
- Orania carnicolor (Bozzetti, 2009)

Synonyms
- Muricopsis carnicolor Bozzetti, 2009

= Orania carnicolor =

Species of gastropod

Orania carnicolor is a species of sea snail, a marine gastropod mollusk in the family Muricidae, the murex snails or rock snails.

== Distribution ==
This marine species occurs off Madagascar.
