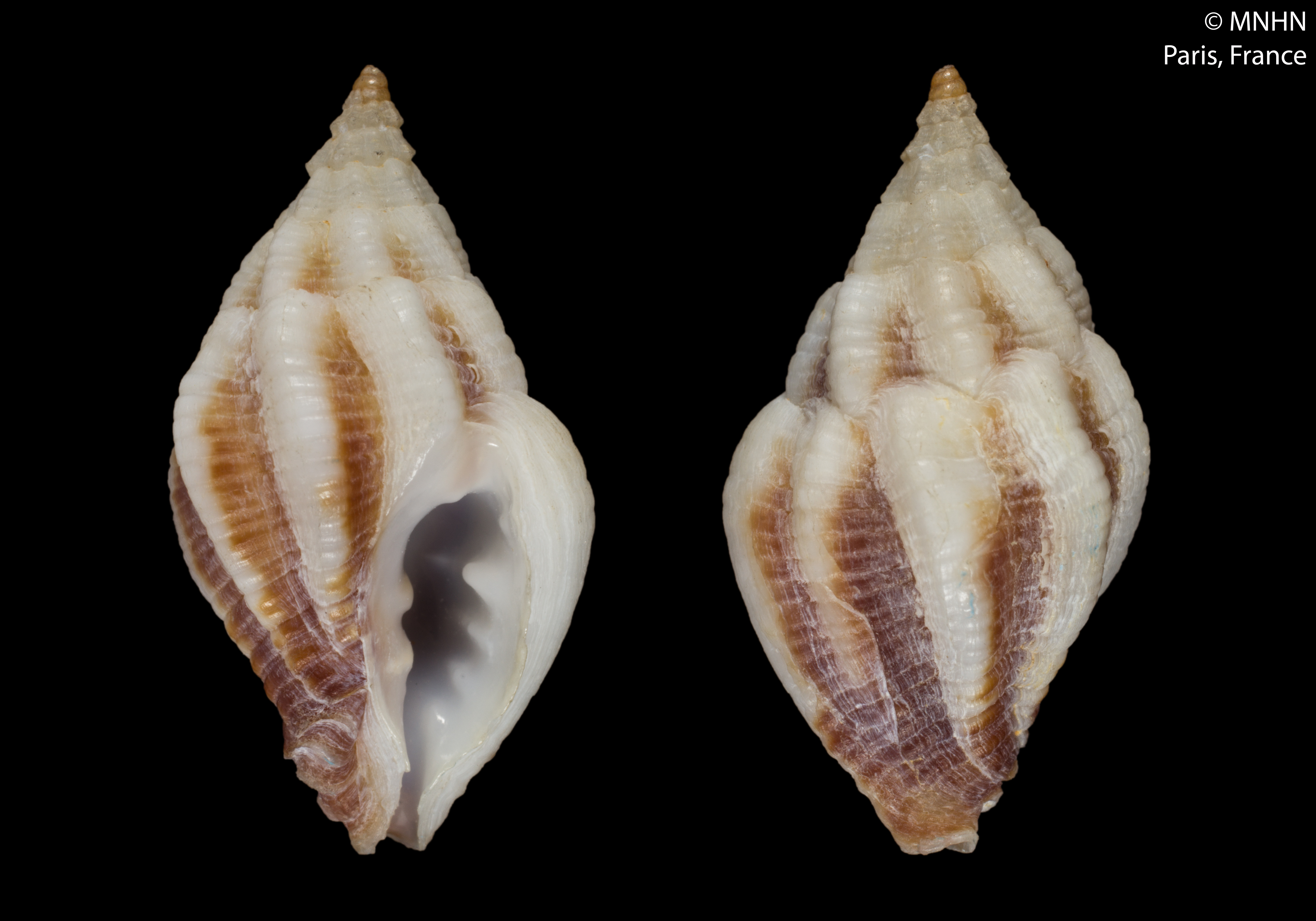
- Shell of Cytharomorula pinguis (paratype at MNHN, Paris)

Scientific classification
- Kingdom: Animalia
- Phylum: Mollusca
- Class: Gastropoda
- Subclass: Caenogastropoda
- Order: Neogastropoda
- Family: Muricidae
- Genus: Cytharomorula
- Species: C. pinguis

Binomial name
- Cytharomorula pinguis Houart, 1995

= Cytharomorula pinguis =

Species of gastropod

Cytharomorula pinguis is a species of sea snail, a marine gastropod mollusk in the family Muricidae, the murex snails or rock snails.

== Distribution ==
This marine species was found on the Loyalty Ridge, off the New Hebrides.
