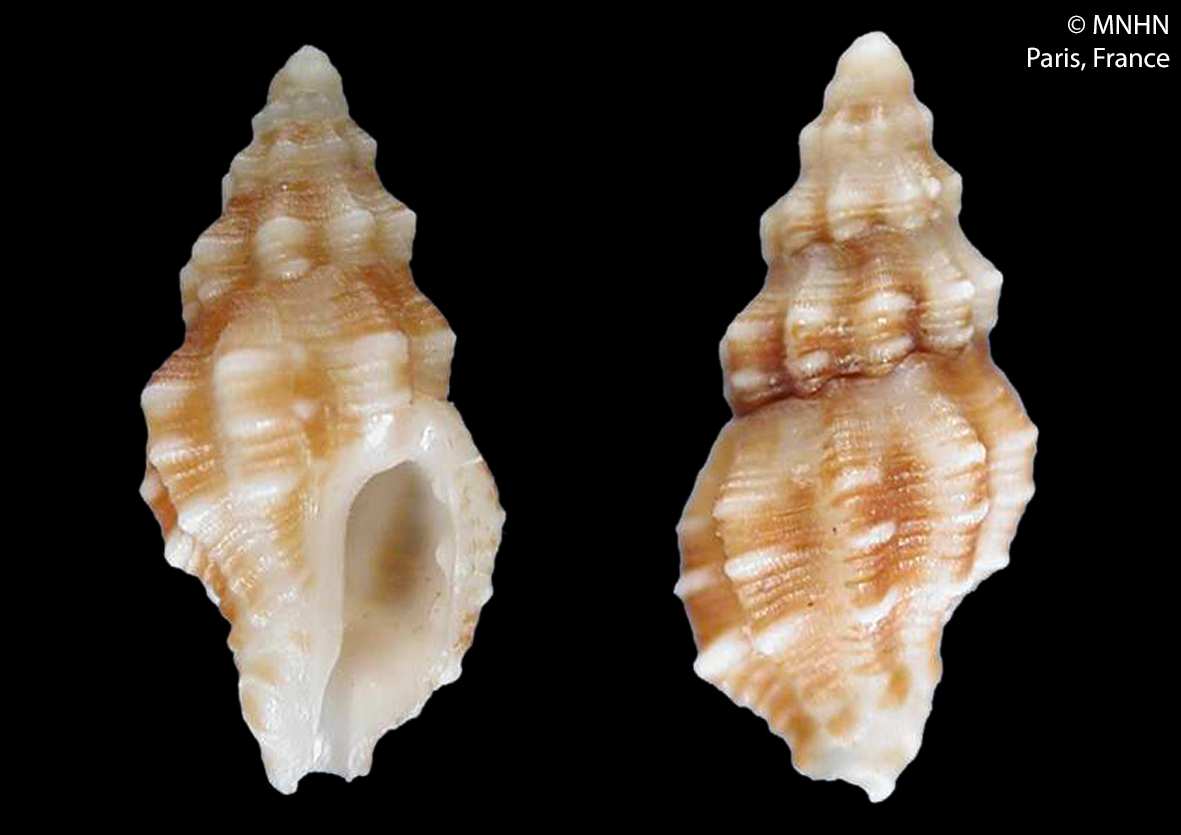
- Shell of Cytharomorula lefevreiana (specimen at MNHN, Paris)

Scientific classification
- Kingdom: Animalia
- Phylum: Mollusca
- Class: Gastropoda
- Subclass: Caenogastropoda
- Order: Neogastropoda
- Family: Muricidae
- Genus: Cytharomorula
- Species: C. lefevreiana

Binomial name
- Cytharomorula lefevreiana (Tapparone-Canefri, 1880)

Synonyms
- Murex (Ocinebra) benedictus Melvill & Standen, 1895; Pascula lefevreiana (Tapparone-Canefri, 1880); Tritonidea lefevreiana Tapparone-Canefri, 1880

= Cytharomorula lefevreiana =

Species of gastropod

Cytharomorula lefevreiana is a species of sea snail, a marine gastropod mollusk in the family Muricidae, the murex snails or rock snails.

== Distribution ==
THis species occurs in the Indian Ocean off Mauritius and Réunion.
