= Orania taiwana =

Scientific classification
- Kingdom: Animalia
- Phylum: Mollusca
- Class: Gastropoda
- Subclass: Caenogastropoda
- Order: Neogastropoda
- Superfamily: Muricoidea
- Family: Muricidae
- Subfamily: Ergalataxinae
- Genus: Orania
- Species: O. taiwana

Binomial name
- Orania taiwana (K.-Y. Lai & B.-S. Jung, 2012)

Synonyms
- Morula taiwana K.-Y. Lai & B.-S. Jung, 2012

Species of gastropod

Orania taiwana is a species of sea snail in the family Muricidae, the murex snails or rock snails. The type series was collected from the lower intertidal zone on the coast of northwestern Taiwan. The holotypemeasures 21 mm (0.83 in) in length.
