= Orania pholidota =

Scientific classification
- Kingdom: Animalia
- Phylum: Mollusca
- Class: Gastropoda
- Subclass: Caenogastropoda
- Order: Neogastropoda
- Family: Muricidae
- Genus: Orania
- Species: O. pholidota

Binomial name
- Orania pholidota (Watson, 1883)

Synonyms
- Fusus cereus E.A. Smith, 1884; Murex pholidotus Watson, 1883

Species of gastropod

Orania pholidota is a species of sea snail, a marine gastropod mollusk in the family Muricidae, the murex snails or rock snails.
