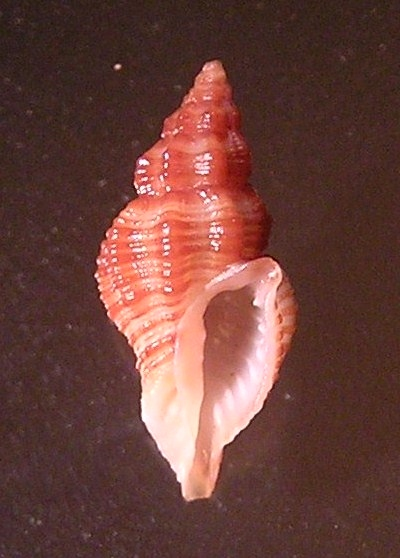

Scientific classification
- Kingdom: Animalia
- Phylum: Mollusca
- Class: Gastropoda
- Subclass: Caenogastropoda
- Order: Neogastropoda
- Family: Muricidae
- Genus: Orania
- Species: O. ficula

Binomial name
- Orania ficula (Reeve 1848)

Synonyms
- Fusus ficula Reeve 1848; Latirus contemptus A. Adams, 1854

= Orania ficula =

Species of gastropod

Orania ficula is a species of sea snail, a marine gastropod mollusk in the family Muricidae, the murex snails or rock snails.
