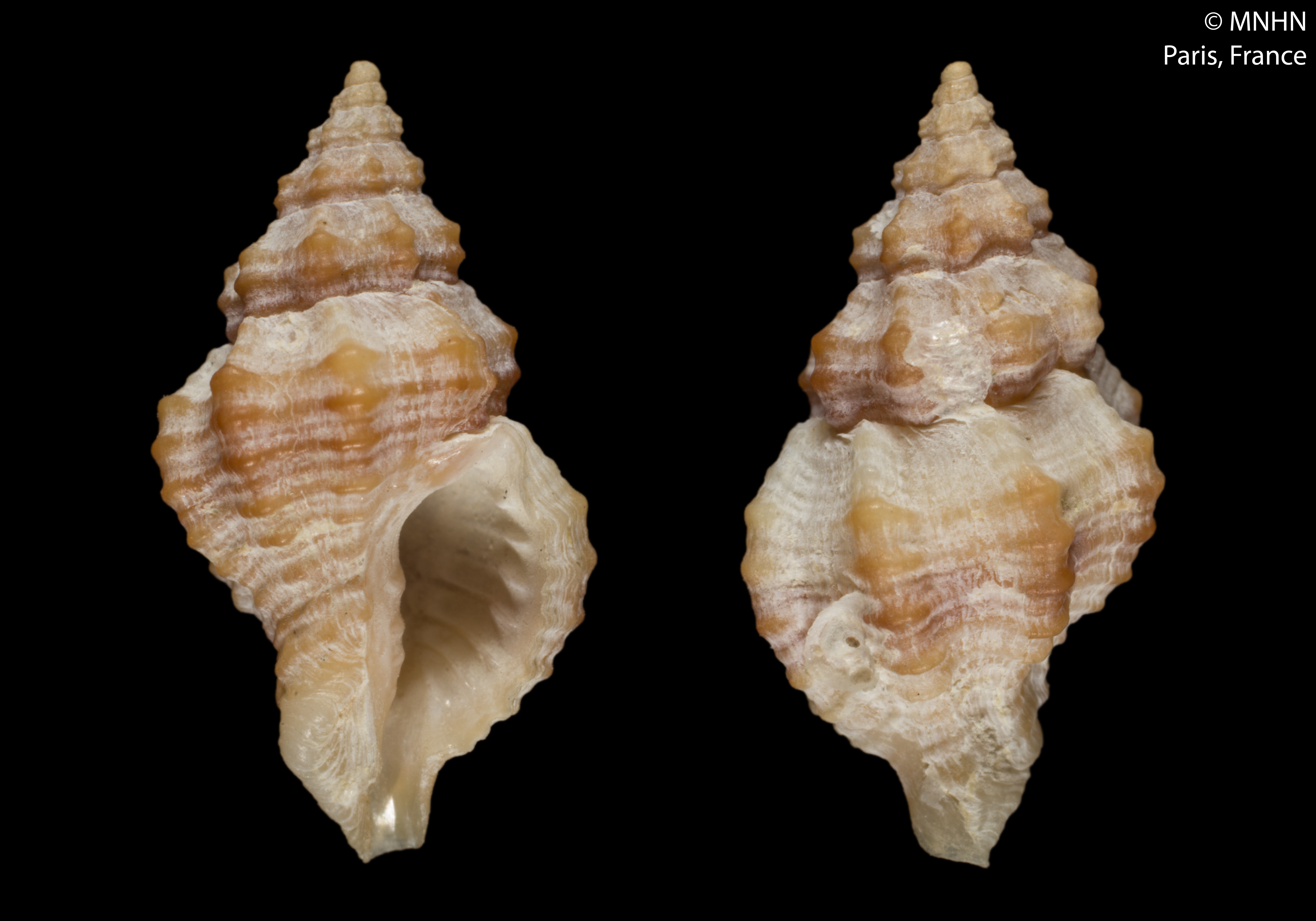
- Shell of Orania adiastolos (holotype at MNHN, Paris)

Scientific classification
- Kingdom: Animalia
- Phylum: Mollusca
- Class: Gastropoda
- Subclass: Caenogastropoda
- Order: Neogastropoda
- Family: Muricidae
- Genus: Orania
- Species: O. adiastolos

Binomial name
- Orania adiastolos Houart, 1995

= Orania adiastolos =

Species of gastropod

Orania adiastolos is a species of sea snail, a marine gastropod mollusk in the family Muricidae, the murex snails or rock snails.

== Distribution ==
This marine species occurs off New Caledonia, Fiji and Tonga; North Zululand, South Africa
