= Orania taeniata =

Scientific classification
- Kingdom: Animalia
- Phylum: Mollusca
- Class: Gastropoda
- Subclass: Caenogastropoda
- Order: Neogastropoda
- Family: Muricidae
- Genus: Orania
- Species: O. taeniata

Binomial name
- Orania taeniata Houart, 1995

Species of gastropod

Orania taeniata is a species of sea snail, a marine gastropod mollusk in the family Muricidae, the murex snails or rock snails.
