= Orania pachyraphe =

Scientific classification
- Kingdom: Animalia
- Phylum: Mollusca
- Class: Gastropoda
- Subclass: Caenogastropoda
- Order: Neogastropoda
- Superfamily: Muricoidea
- Family: Muricidae
- Subfamily: Ergalataxinae
- Genus: Orania
- Species: O. pachyraphe

Binomial name
- Orania pachyraphe (E. A. Smith, 1879)

Synonyms
- Fusus pachyraphe E. A. Smith, 1879

Species of gastropod

Orania pachyraphe is a species of sea snail, a marine gastropod mollusk, in the family Muricidae, the murex snails or rock snails.
