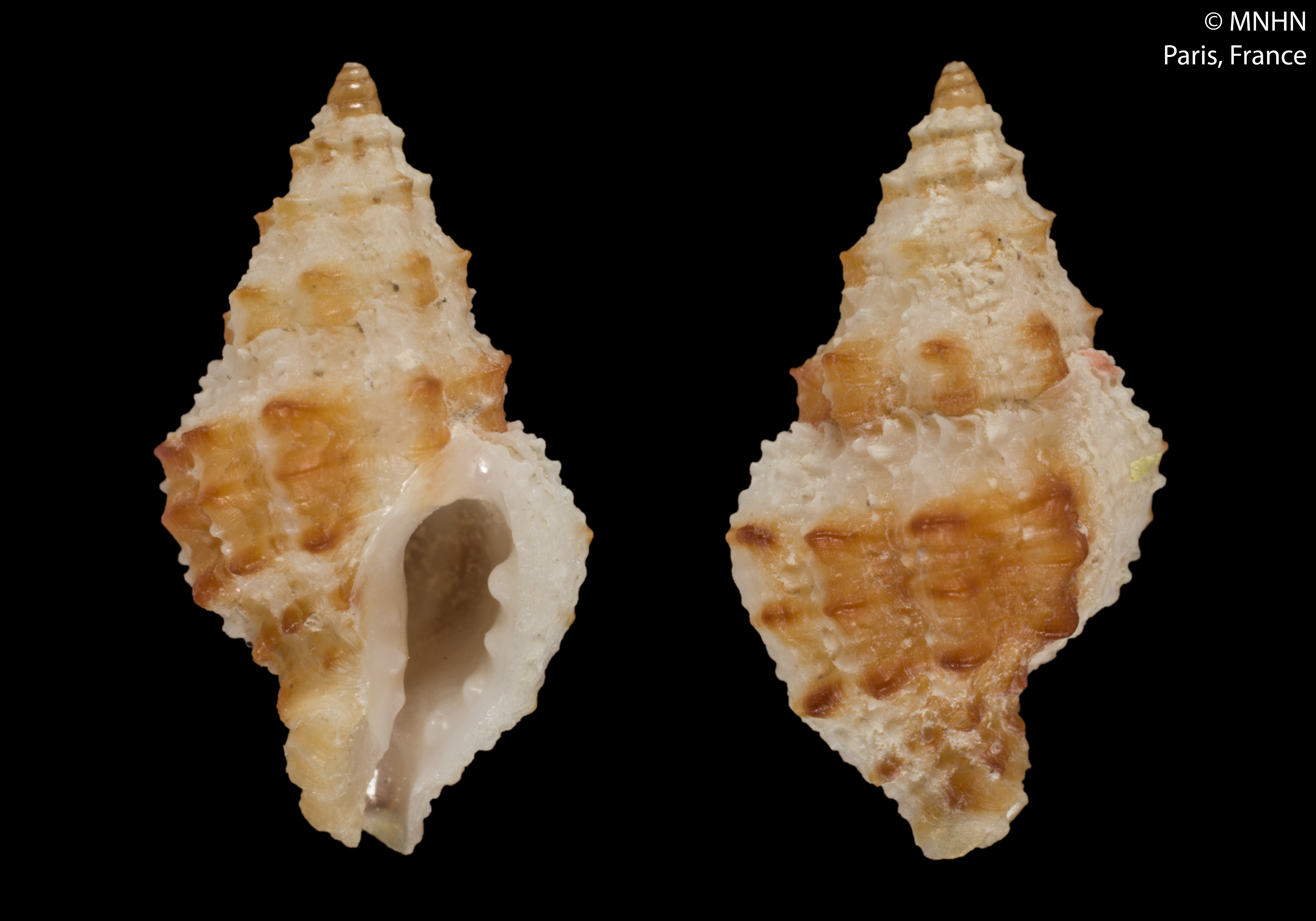
- Shell of Orania maestratii (holotype at MNHN, Paris)

Scientific classification
- Kingdom: Animalia
- Phylum: Mollusca
- Class: Gastropoda
- Subclass: Caenogastropoda
- Order: Neogastropoda
- Family: Muricidae
- Genus: Orania
- Species: O. maestratii

Binomial name
- Orania maestratii Houart & Tröndlé, 2008

= Orania maestratii =

Species of gastropod

Orania maestratii is a species of sea snail, a marine gastropod mollusk in the family Muricidae, the murex snails or rock snails.

== Description ==
The length of the shell attains 10.1 mm.

== Distribution ==
This marine species occurs off the Austral Islands, French Polynesia.
