= Orania purpurea =

Scientific classification
- Kingdom: Animalia
- Phylum: Mollusca
- Class: Gastropoda
- Subclass: Caenogastropoda
- Order: Neogastropoda
- Family: Muricidae
- Genus: Orania
- Species: O. purpurea

Binomial name
- Orania purpurea (Kuroda & Habe, 1961)

Synonyms
- Ergalatax purpureus Kuroda & Habe, 1961

Species of gastropod

Orania purpurea is a species of sea snail, a marine gastropod mollusk in the family Muricidae, the murex snails or rock snails.
