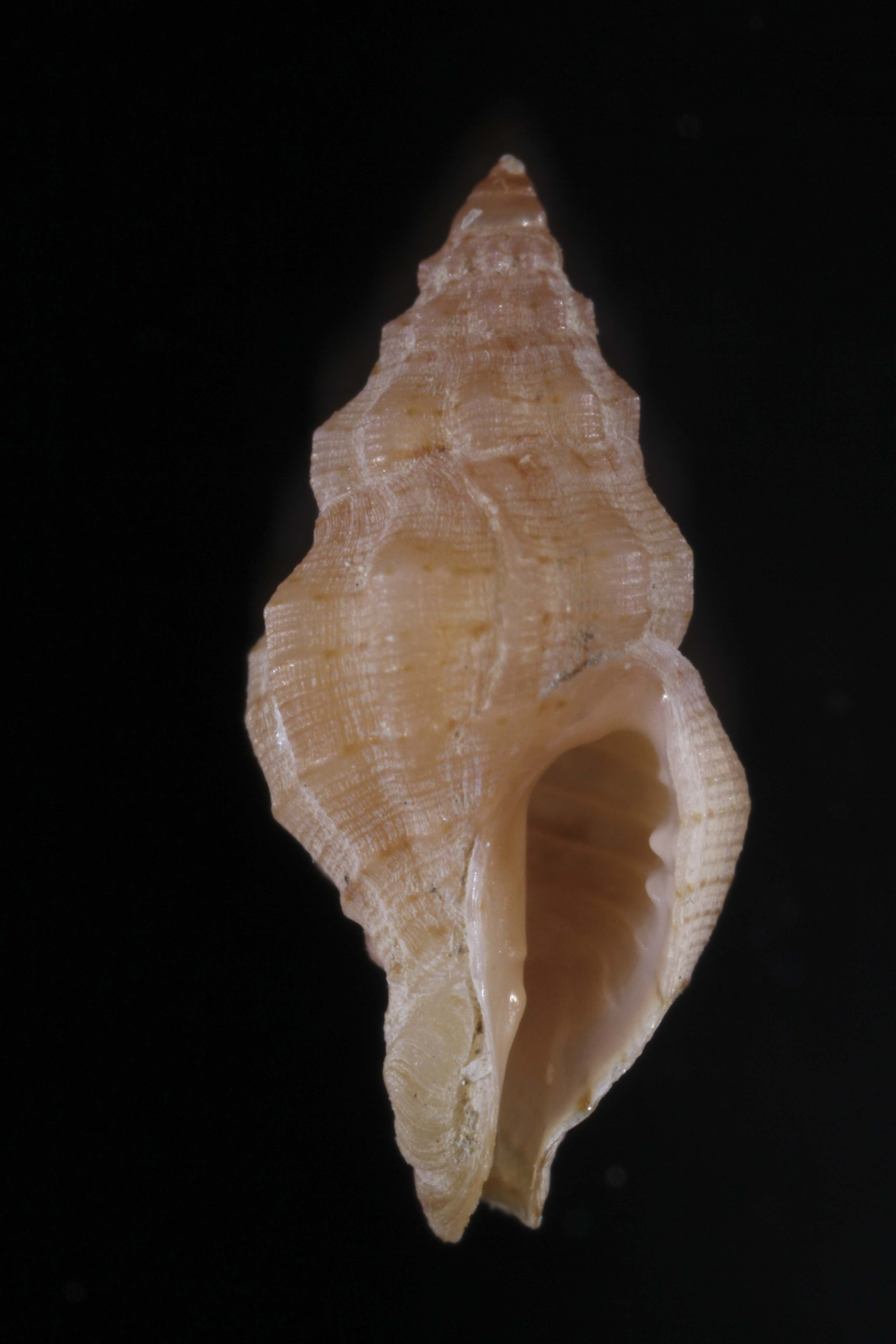
- Shell of Cytharomorula paucimaculata (specimen at MNHN, Paris)

Scientific classification
- Kingdom: Animalia
- Phylum: Mollusca
- Class: Gastropoda
- Subclass: Caenogastropoda
- Order: Neogastropoda
- Family: Muricidae
- Genus: Cytharomorula
- Species: C. paucimaculata

Binomial name
- Cytharomorula paucimaculata (Sowerby, 1903)

Synonyms
- Pentadactylus paucimaculatus Sowerby, 1903

= Cytharomorula paucimaculata =

Species of gastropod

Cytharomorula paucimaculata is a species of sea snail, a marine gastropod mollusk in the family Muricidae, the murex snails or rock snails.

== Distribution ==
This marine species occurs off Japan and Papua New Guinea.
