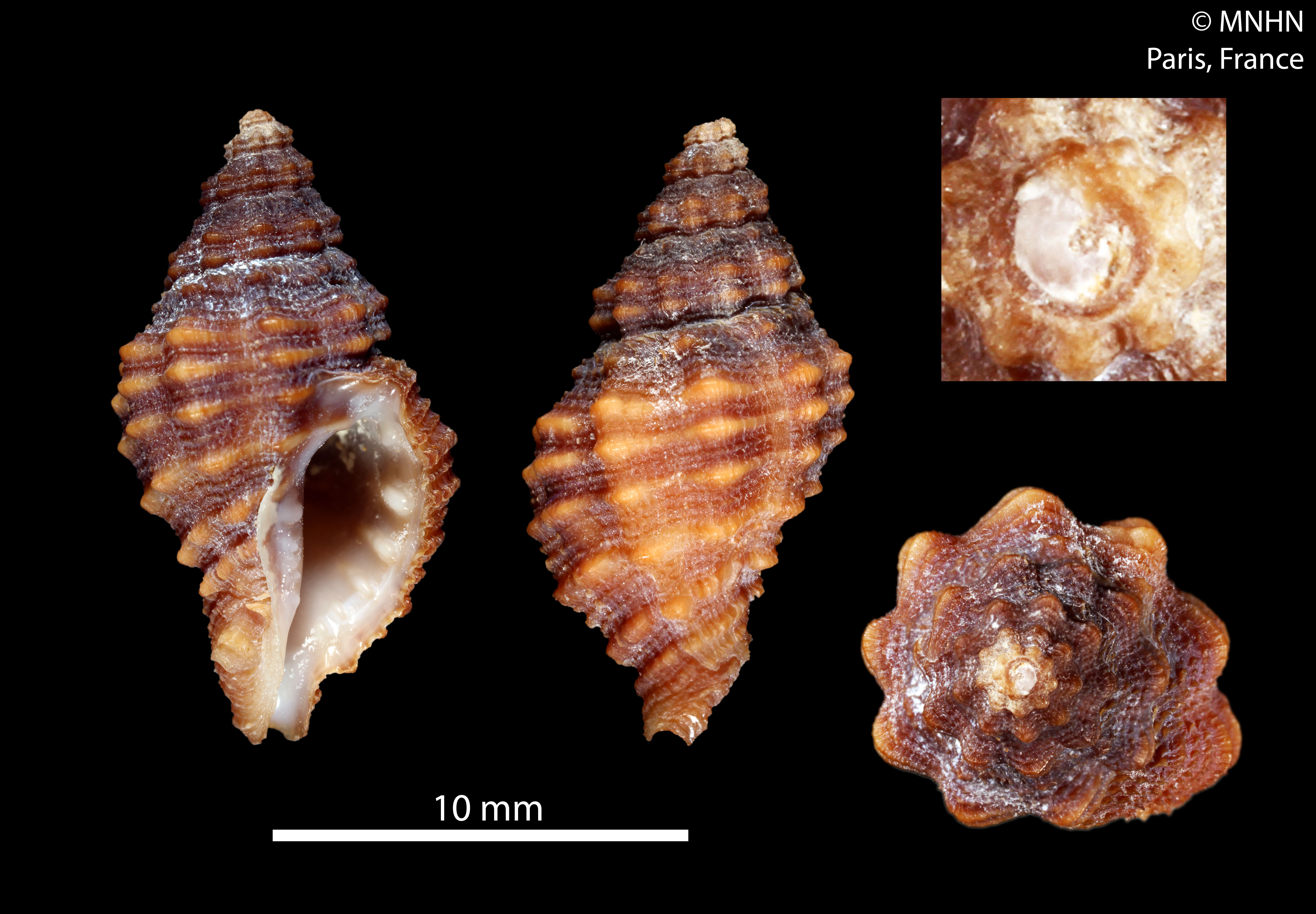
- Shell of Orania xuthedra (paratype at MNHN, Paris)

Scientific classification
- Kingdom: Animalia
- Phylum: Mollusca
- Class: Gastropoda
- Subclass: Caenogastropoda
- Order: Neogastropoda
- Family: Muricidae
- Genus: Orania
- Species: O. xuthedra

Binomial name
- Orania xuthedra (Melvill, 1893)

Synonyms
- Orania alexanderi Houart, 1985; Ricinula (Sistrum) xuthedra Melvill, 1893

= Orania xuthedra =

Species of gastropod

Orania xuthedra is a species of sea snail, a marine gastropod mollusk in the family Muricidae, the murex snails or rock snails.

== Distribution ==
This marine species occurs off Sri Lanka.

== External linkjs ==
- Melvill, J. C. (1893). Descriptions of twenty-five new species of marine shells from Bombay collected by Alexander Abercrombie, Esq. Memoirs and proceedings of the Manchester Literary & Philosophical Society. 7: 52-67, 1 pl.
