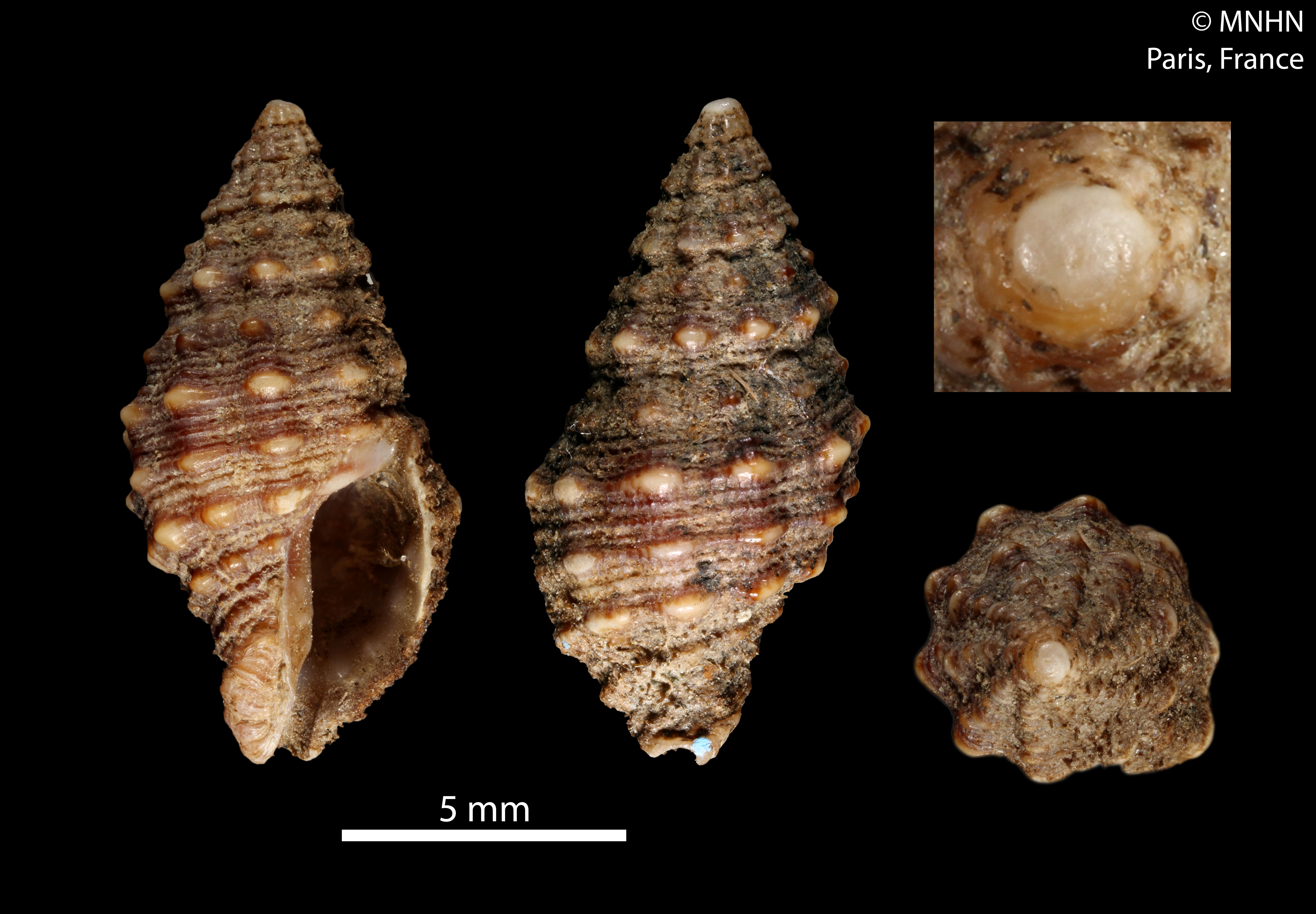
- Shell of Orania dharmai (paratype at MNHN, Paris)

Scientific classification
- Kingdom: Animalia
- Phylum: Mollusca
- Class: Gastropoda
- Subclass: Caenogastropoda
- Order: Neogastropoda
- Family: Muricidae
- Genus: Orania
- Species: O. dharmai

Binomial name
- Orania dharmai Houart, 1995

= Orania dharmai =

Species of gastropod

Orania dharmai is a species of sea snail, a marine gastropod mollusk in the family Muricidae, the murex snails or rock snails.

== Distribution ==
This marine species occurs off Sumatra and Borneo, Indonesia;
