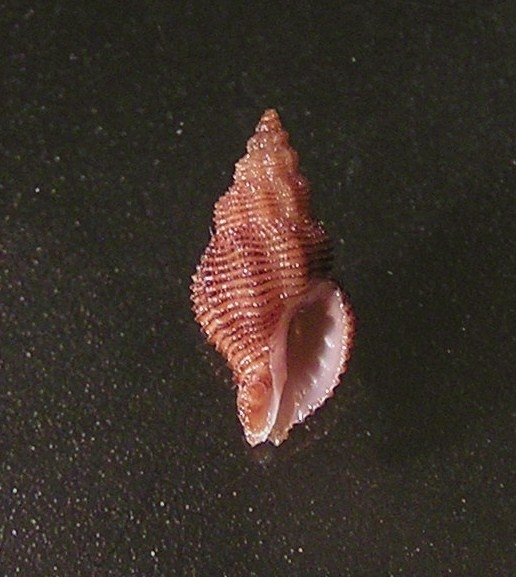
- Orania walkeri

Scientific classification
- Kingdom: Animalia
- Phylum: Mollusca
- Class: Gastropoda
- Subclass: Caenogastropoda
- Order: Neogastropoda
- Family: Muricidae
- Genus: Orania
- Species: O. walkeri

Binomial name
- Orania walkeri (Sowerby, 1908)

Synonyms
- Urosalpinx walkeri Sowerby, 1908

= Orania walkeri =

Species of gastropod

Orania walkeri is a species of sea snail, a marine gastropod mollusk in the family Muricidae, the murex snails or rock snails.
