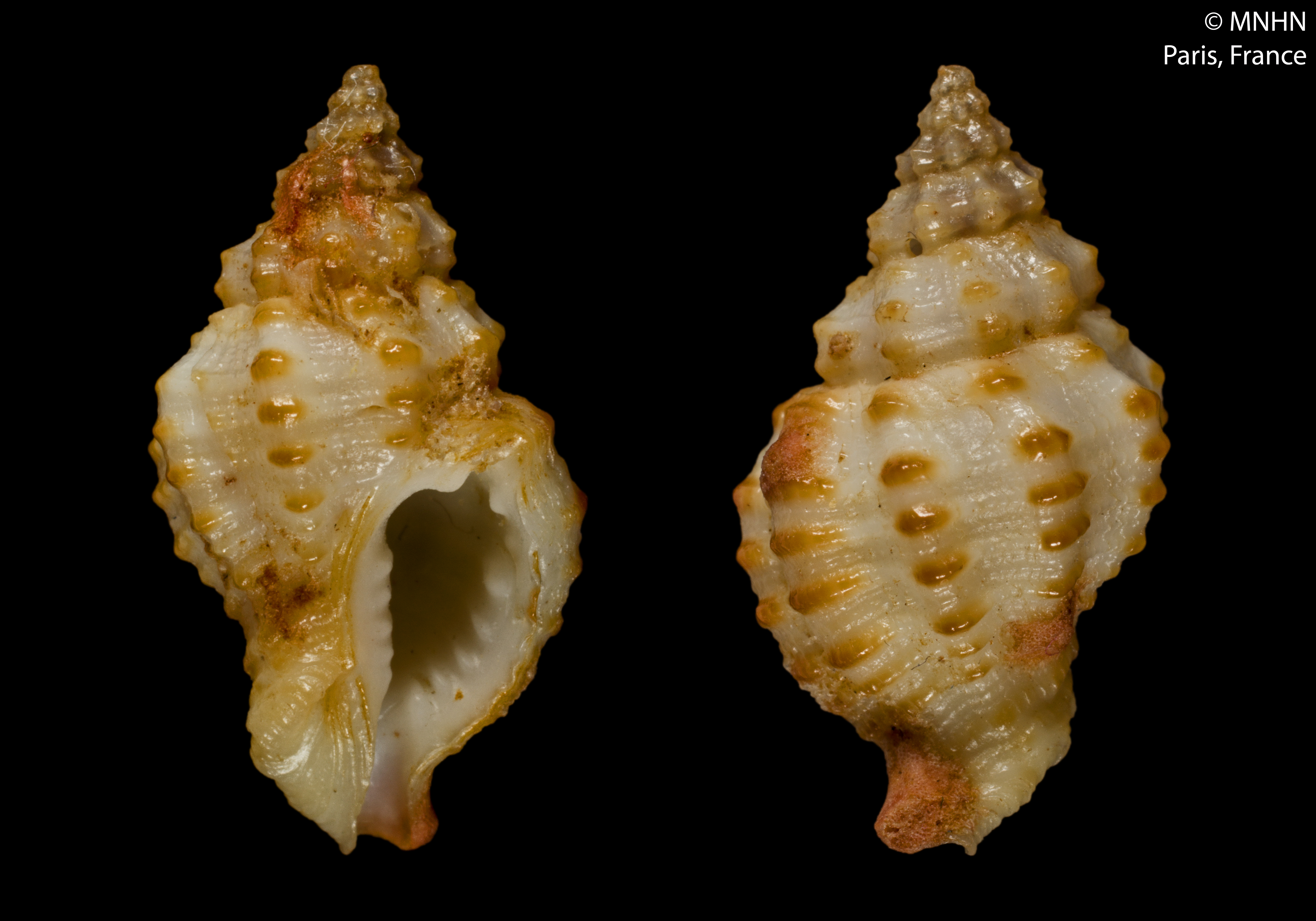
- Shell of Orania corallina (holotype at MNHN, Paris)

Scientific classification
- Kingdom: Animalia
- Phylum: Mollusca
- Class: Gastropoda
- Subclass: Caenogastropoda
- Order: Neogastropoda
- Family: Muricidae
- Genus: Orania
- Species: O. corallina

Binomial name
- Orania corallina (Melvill & Standen, 1903)

Synonyms
- Muricopsis hubrechti Bozzetti, 2018; Peristernia corallina Melvill & Standen, 1903

= Orania corallina =

Species of gastropod

Orania corallina is a species of sea snail, a marine gastropod mollusk in the family Muricidae, the murex snails or rock snails.

== Description ==
Orania corallina is also a non-broadcast spawner. Life cycle does not include trochophore stage. It has internal fertilization.

It has dextrally coiled body symmetry.

== Distribution ==
The length of the shell attains 14 mm. The body volume was 0.356 cm^3, and its wet body mass was 0.623 g.

- Geospatial Information

Countries: Philippines, North Zululand, South Africa, Mozambique, Madagascar, and The Seychelles (living usually at depths less than 100 m)

Precise Location: Cebu Is.(North Coast), Bohol Strait

- Ref: [MUSEUMS VICTORIA COLLECTIONS]

This marine species occurs also in the Persian Gulf and off South Africa and Madagascar; probably throughout the Indian Ocean. In the Pacific in New Caledonia, the Solomon Islands and the Philippines; also Malaysia and Indonesia, living usually at depths less than 100 m.
