= Orania simonetae =

Scientific classification
- Kingdom: Animalia
- Phylum: Mollusca
- Class: Gastropoda
- Subclass: Caenogastropoda
- Order: Neogastropoda
- Family: Muricidae
- Genus: Orania
- Species: O. simonetae

Binomial name
- Orania simonetae Houart, 1995

Species of gastropod

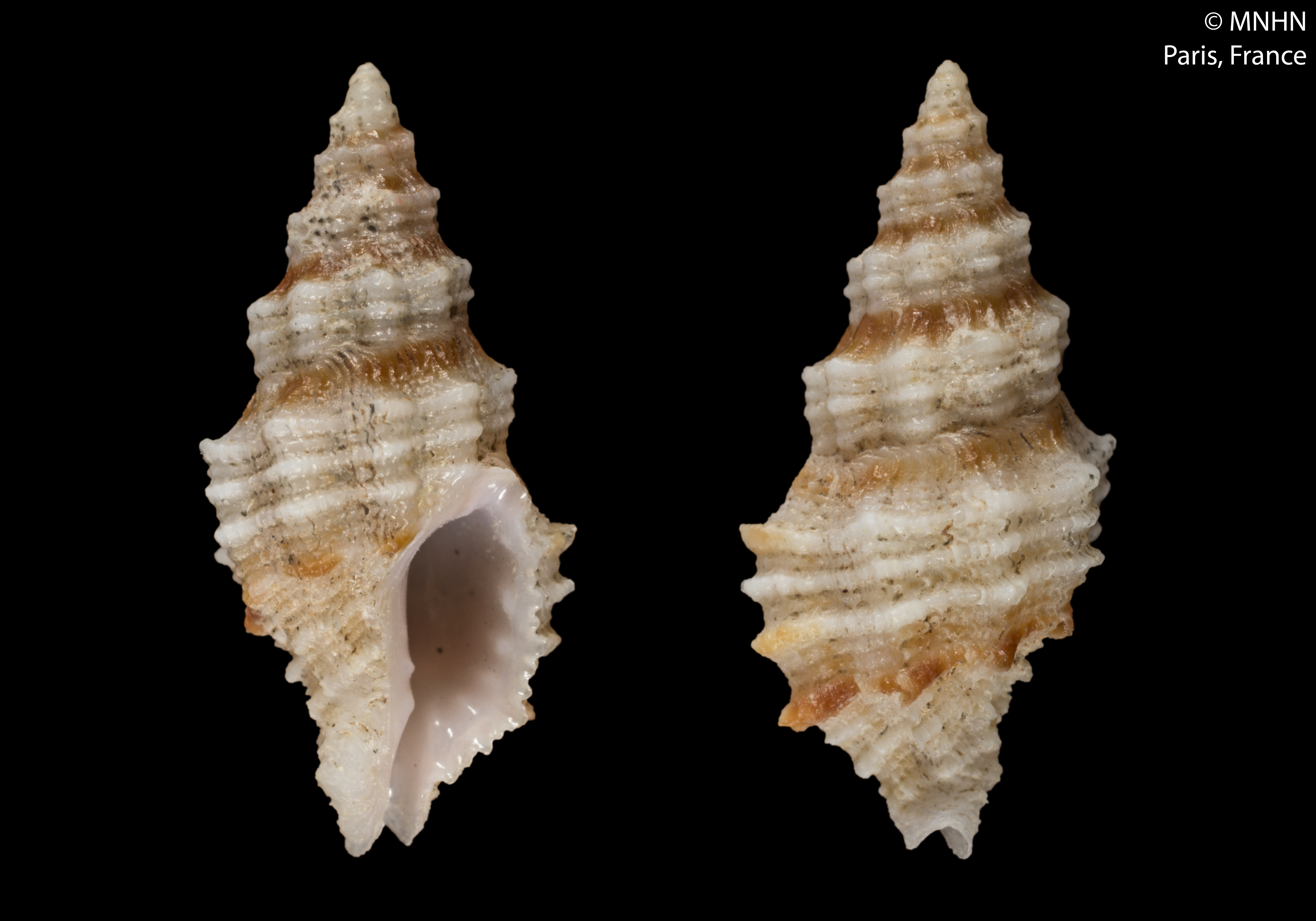
Orania simonetae

Orania simonetae is a species of sea snail, a marine gastropod mollusk in the family Muricidae, the murex snails or rock snails.

== Distribution ==
This marine species occurs off the Marquesas Islands, French Polynesia.
