= Cytharomorula ambonensis =

Scientific classification
- Kingdom: Animalia
- Phylum: Mollusca
- Class: Gastropoda
- Subclass: Caenogastropoda
- Order: Neogastropoda
- Family: Muricidae
- Genus: Cytharomorula
- Species: C. ambonensis

Binomial name
- Cytharomorula ambonensis (Houart, 1996)

Synonyms
- Pascula ambonensis Houart, 1996

Species of gastropod

Cytharomorula ambonensis is a species of sea snail, a marine gastropod mollusk in the family Muricidae, the murex snails or rock snails.
