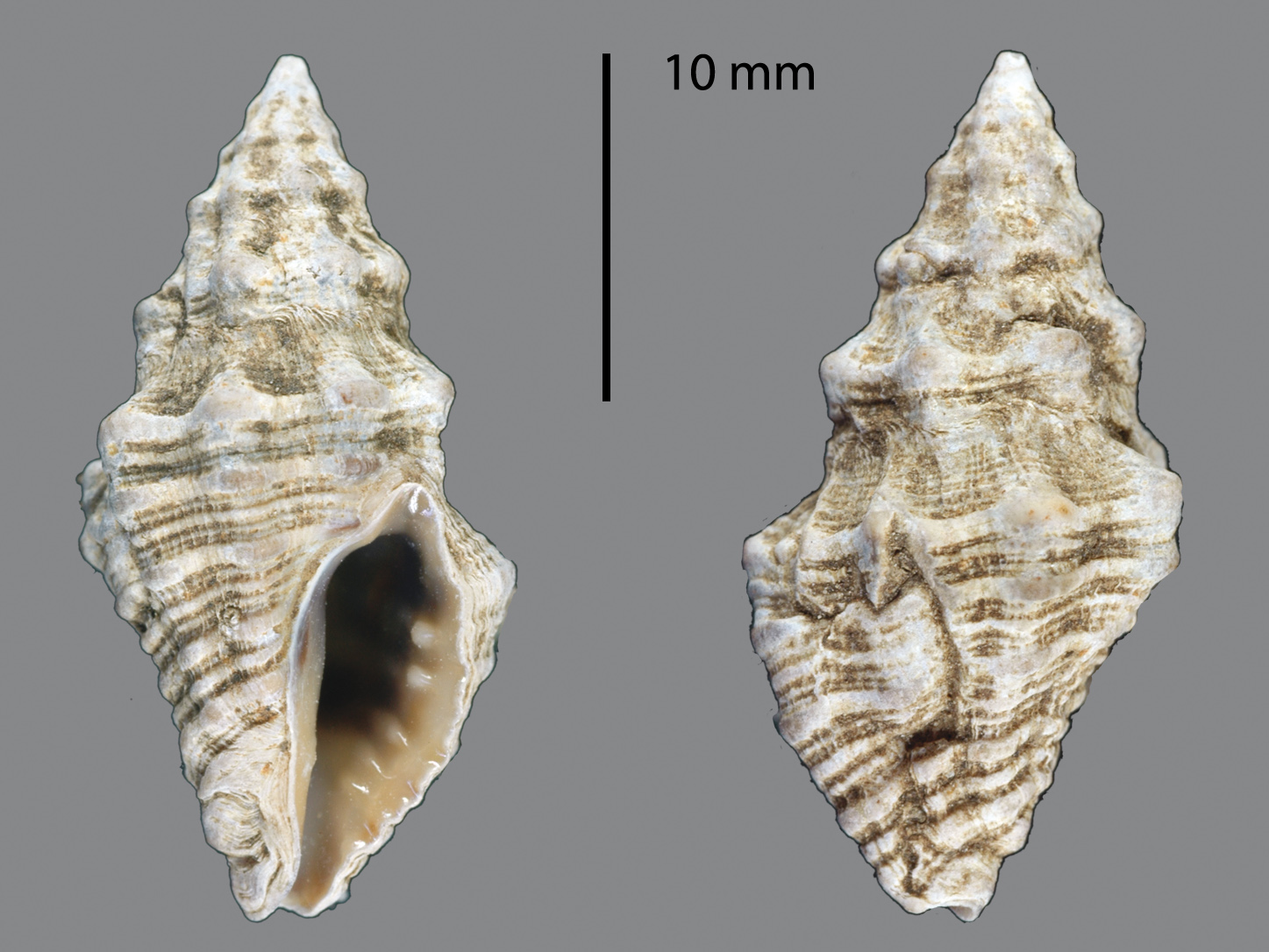

Scientific classification
- Kingdom: Animalia
- Phylum: Mollusca
- Class: Gastropoda
- Subclass: Caenogastropoda
- Order: Neogastropoda
- Family: Muricidae
- Genus: Orania
- Species: O. bimucronata

Binomial name
- Orania bimucronata (Reeve, 1846)

Synonyms
- Buccinum bimucronatum Reeve, 1846

= Orania bimucronata =

Species of gastropod

Orania bimucronata is a species of sea snail, a marine gastropod mollusk in the family Muricidae, the murex snails or rock snails.

== Distribution ==
This marine species occurs off the Philippines.
