= Orania badia =

Scientific classification
- Kingdom: Animalia
- Phylum: Mollusca
- Class: Gastropoda
- Subclass: Caenogastropoda
- Order: Neogastropoda
- Family: Muricidae
- Genus: Orania
- Species: O. badia

Binomial name
- Orania badia (Reeve, 1845)

Synonyms
- Murex badius Reeve, 1845

Species of gastropod

Orania badia is a species of sea snail, a marine gastropod mollusk in the family Muricidae, the murex snails or rock snails.
