= Orania gaskelli =

Scientific classification
- Kingdom: Animalia
- Phylum: Mollusca
- Class: Gastropoda
- Subclass: Caenogastropoda
- Order: Neogastropoda
- Family: Muricidae
- Genus: Orania
- Species: O. gaskelli

Binomial name
- Orania gaskelli (Melvill, 1891)

Synonyms
- Pisania gaskelli Melvill, 1891; Tritonidea neglecta Sowerby, 1894

Species of gastropod

Orania gaskelli is a species of sea snail, a marine gastropod mollusk in the family Muricidae, the murex snails or rock snails.
