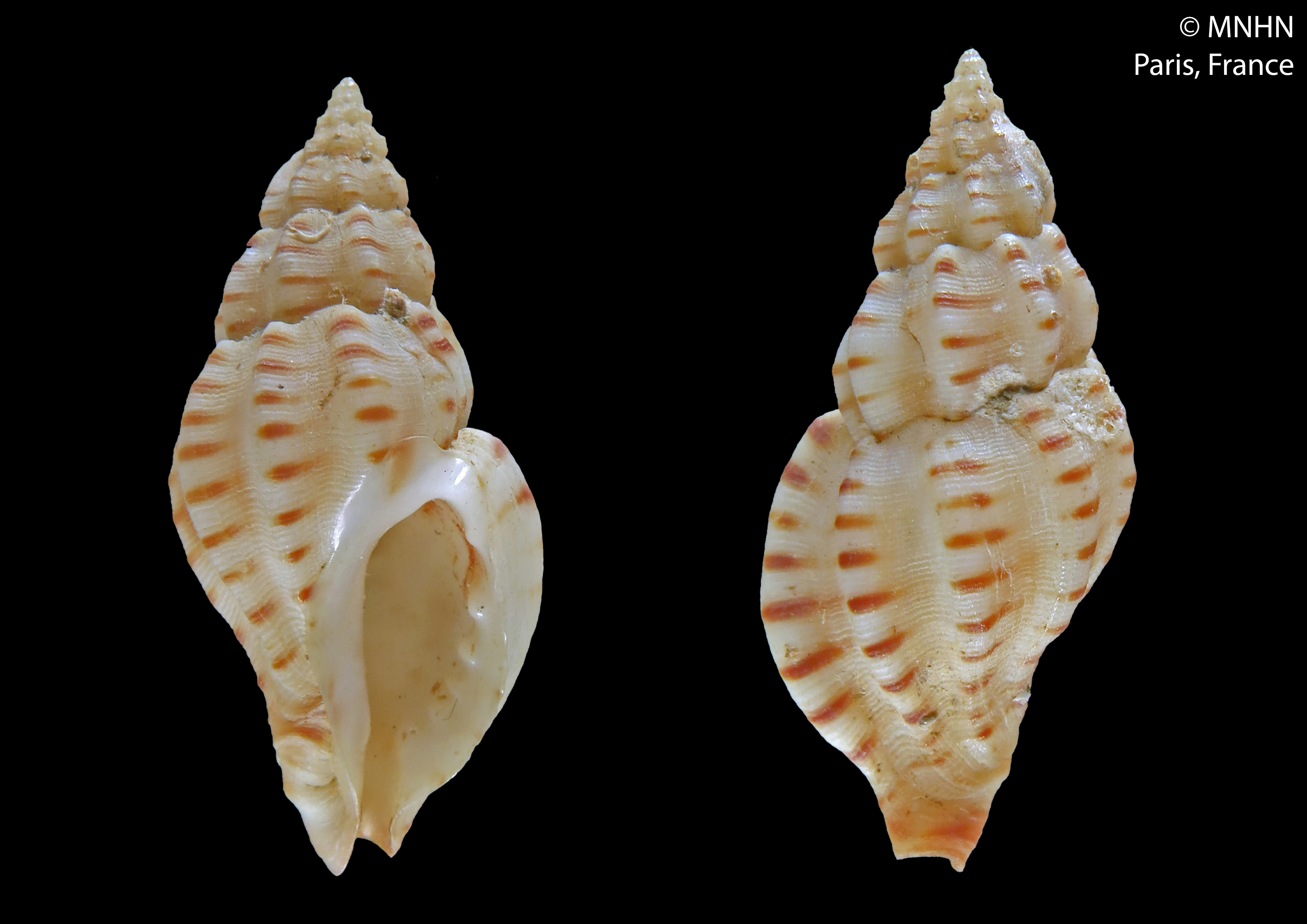
- Shell of Cytharomorula vexillum (specimen at MNHN, Paris)

Scientific classification
- Kingdom: Animalia
- Phylum: Mollusca
- Class: Gastropoda
- Subclass: Caenogastropoda
- Order: Neogastropoda
- Family: Muricidae
- Genus: Cytharomorula
- Species: C. vexillum

Binomial name
- Cytharomorula vexillum Kuroda, 1953

Synonyms
- Azumamorula vexillum (Kuroda, 1953)

= Cytharomorula vexillum =

Species of gastropod

Cytharomorula vexillum is a species of sea snail, a marine gastropod mollusk in the family Muricidae, the murex snails or rock snails.

== Distribution ==
This marine species occurs off Japan.
