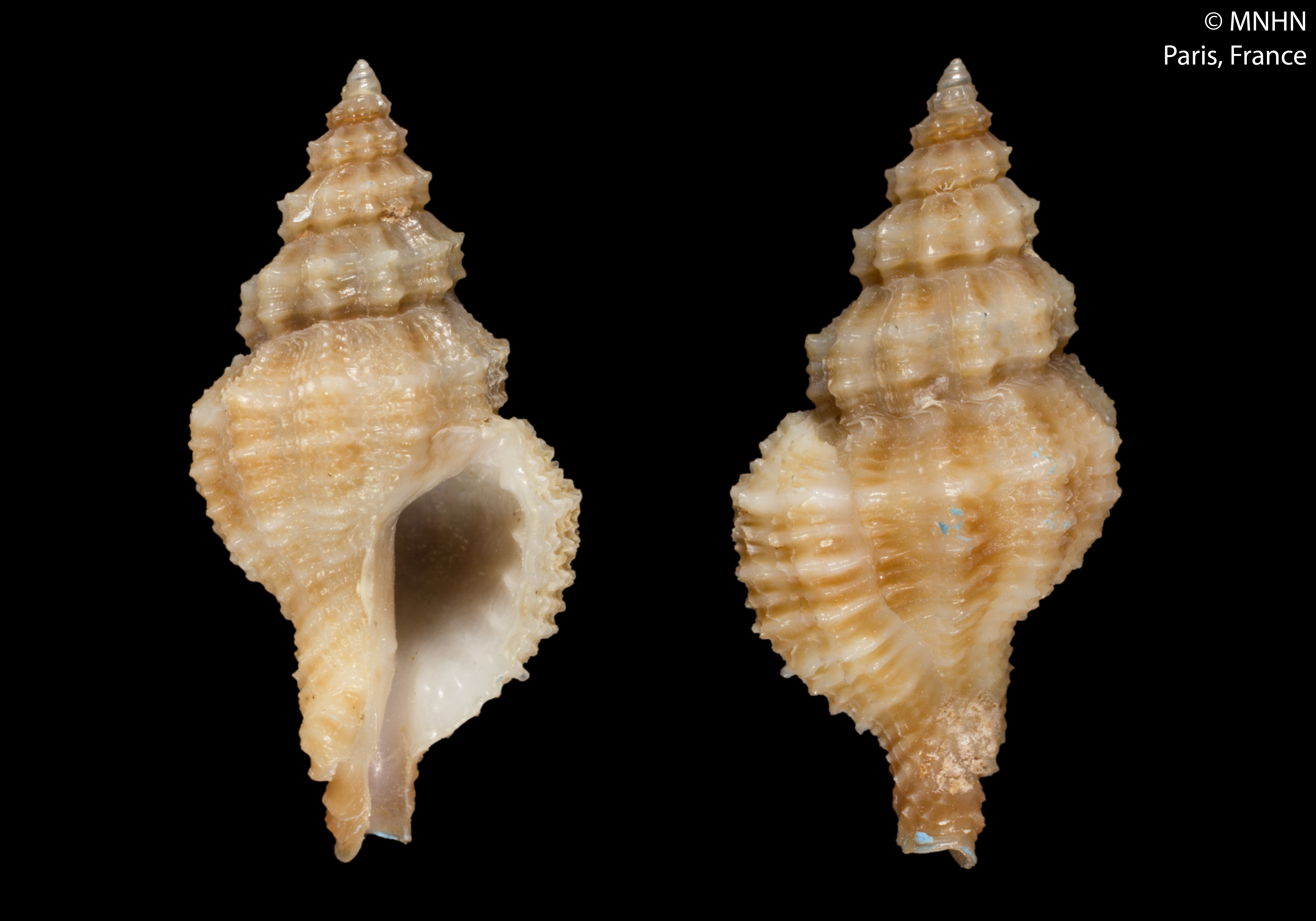
- Shell of Orania mixta (holotype at MNHN, Paris)

Scientific classification
- Kingdom: Animalia
- Phylum: Mollusca
- Class: Gastropoda
- Subclass: Caenogastropoda
- Order: Neogastropoda
- Family: Muricidae
- Genus: Orania
- Species: O. mixta

Binomial name
- Orania mixta (Houart, 1995)

Synonyms
- Lataxiena (Orania) mixta Houart, 1995; Lataxiena mixta (Houart, 1995)

= Orania mixta =

Species of gastropod

Orania mixta is a species of sea snail, a marine gastropod mollusk in the family Muricidae, the murex snails or rock snails.

== Distribution ==
This marine species occurs off the Philippines.
