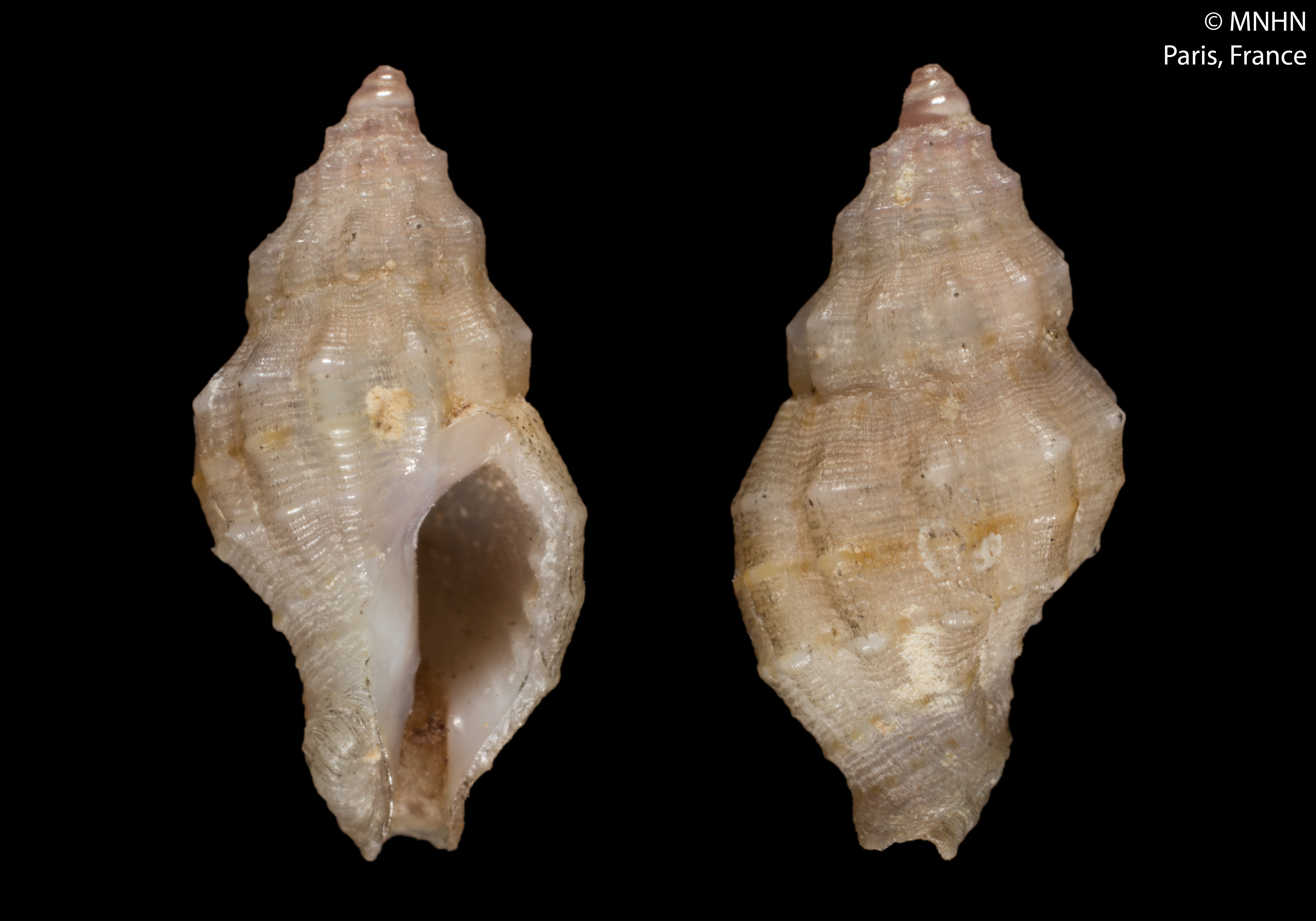
- Shell of Cytharomorula dollfusi (holotype at MNHN, Paris)

Scientific classification
- Kingdom: Animalia
- Phylum: Mollusca
- Class: Gastropoda
- Subclass: Caenogastropoda
- Order: Neogastropoda
- Superfamily: Muricoidea
- Family: Muricidae
- Subfamily: Ergalataxinae
- Genus: Cytharomorula
- Species: C. dollfusi

Binomial name
- Cytharomorula dollfusi (Lamy, 1938)

Synonyms
- Murex dollfusi Lamy, 1938

= Cytharomorula dollfusi =

Species of gastropod

Cytharomorula dollfusi is a species of sea snail, a marine gastropod mollusk, in the family Muricidae, the murex snails or rock snails.

== Distribution ==
This marine species occurs off Egypt.
