= Orania albozonata =

Scientific classification
- Kingdom: Animalia
- Phylum: Mollusca
- Class: Gastropoda
- Subclass: Caenogastropoda
- Order: Neogastropoda
- Superfamily: Muricoidea
- Family: Muricidae
- Subfamily: Ergalataxinae
- Genus: Orania
- Species: O. albozonata

Binomial name
- Orania albozonata (E. A. Smith, 1890)

Synonyms
- Cantharus (Tritonidea) albozonatus E. A. Smith, 1890

Species of gastropod

Orania albozonata is a species of sea snail, a marine gastropod mollusk, in the family Muricidae, the murex snails or rock snails.
