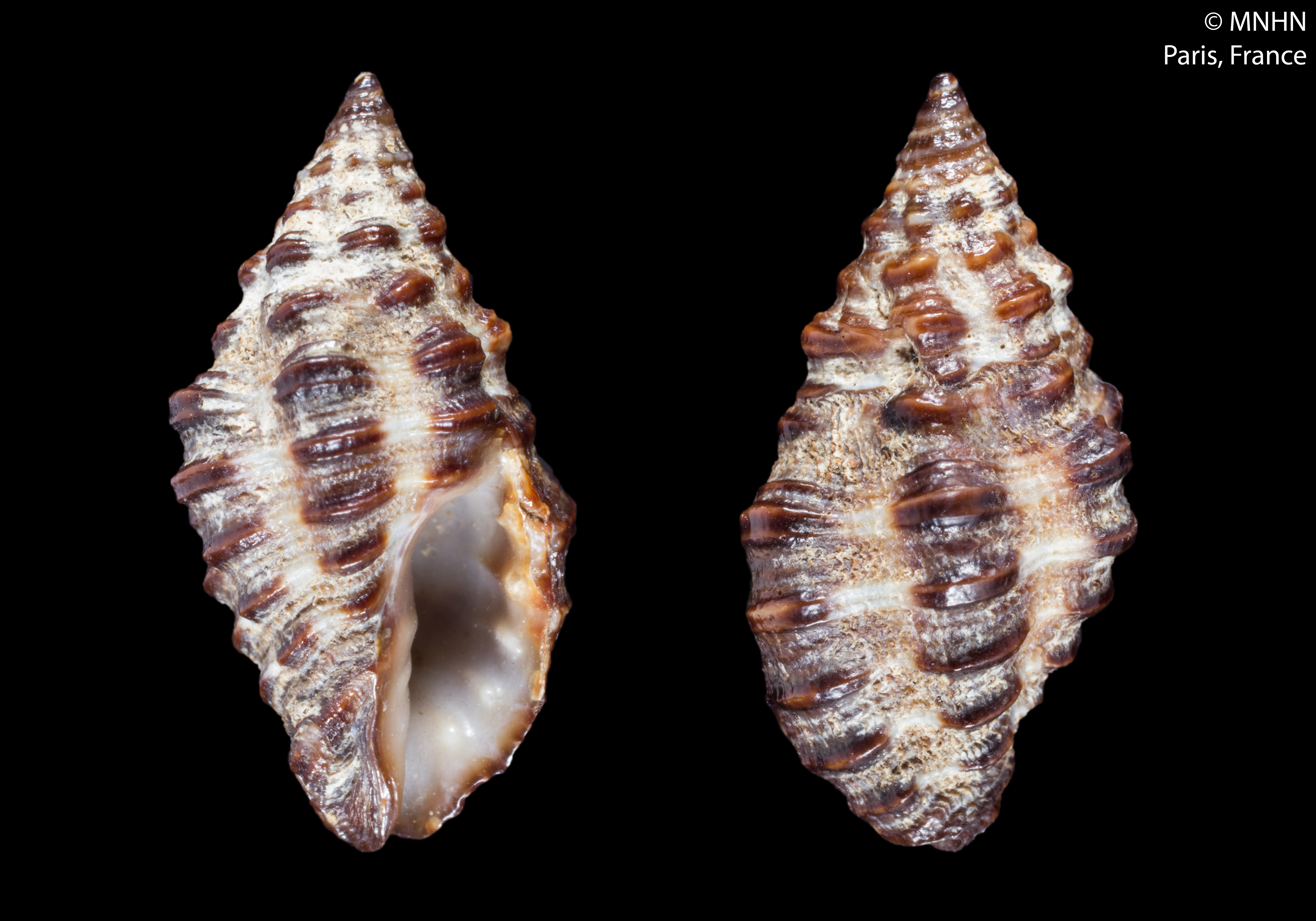
- Shell of Orania nodosa

Scientific classification
- Kingdom: Animalia
- Phylum: Mollusca
- Class: Gastropoda
- Subclass: Caenogastropoda
- Order: Neogastropoda
- Family: Muricidae
- Genus: Orania
- Species: O. nodosa

Binomial name
- Orania nodosa (Hombron & Jacquinot, 1841)

Synonyms
- Purpura nodosa Hombron & Jacquinot, 1841

= Orania nodosa =

Species of gastropod

Orania nodosa is a species of sea snail, a marine gastropod mollusk in the family Muricidae, the murex snails or rock snails.

== Description ==
The length of the shell attains 18.4 mm.

== Distribution ==
This marine species occurs off the Solomon Islands.
