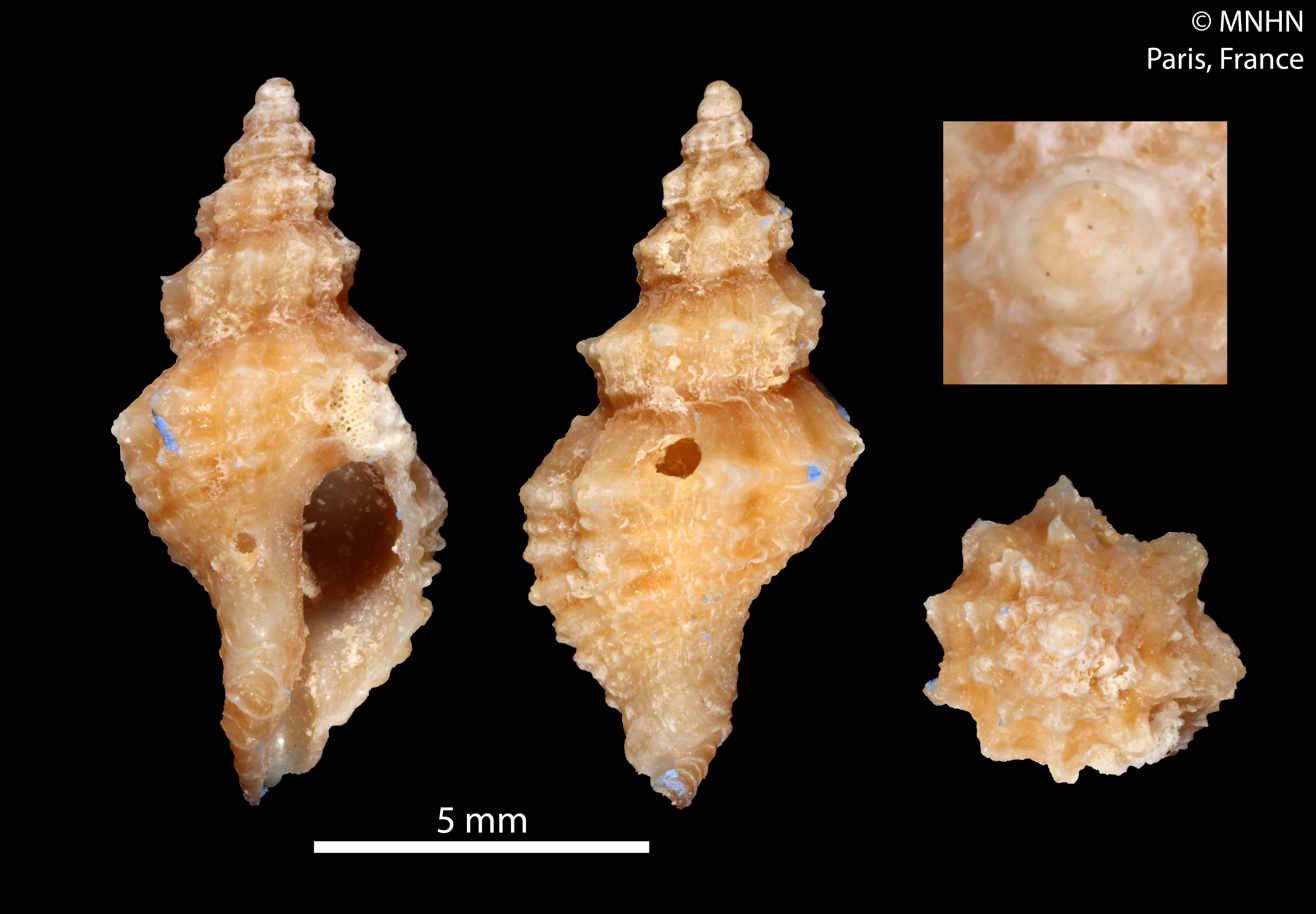
- Shell of Orania rosadoi (paratype at MNHN, Paris)

Scientific classification
- Kingdom: Animalia
- Phylum: Mollusca
- Class: Gastropoda
- Subclass: Caenogastropoda
- Order: Neogastropoda
- Family: Muricidae
- Genus: Orania
- Species: O. rosadoi

Binomial name
- Orania rosadoi Houart, 1998

= Orania rosadoi =

Species of mollusc

Orania rosadoi is a species of sea snail, a marine gastropod mollusk in the family Muricidae, the murex snails or rock snails.

== Distribution ==
This marine species occurs off Mozambique.
