= Orania subnodulosa =

Scientific classification
- Kingdom: Animalia
- Phylum: Mollusca
- Class: Gastropoda
- Subclass: Caenogastropoda
- Order: Neogastropoda
- Family: Muricidae
- Genus: Orania
- Species: O. subnodulosa

Binomial name
- Orania subnodulosa (Melvill, 1893)

Synonyms
- Ricinula (Sistrum) subnodulosa Melvill, 1893

Species of gastropod

Orania subnodulosa is a species of sea snail, a marine gastropod mollusk in the family Muricidae, the murex snails or rock snails.
