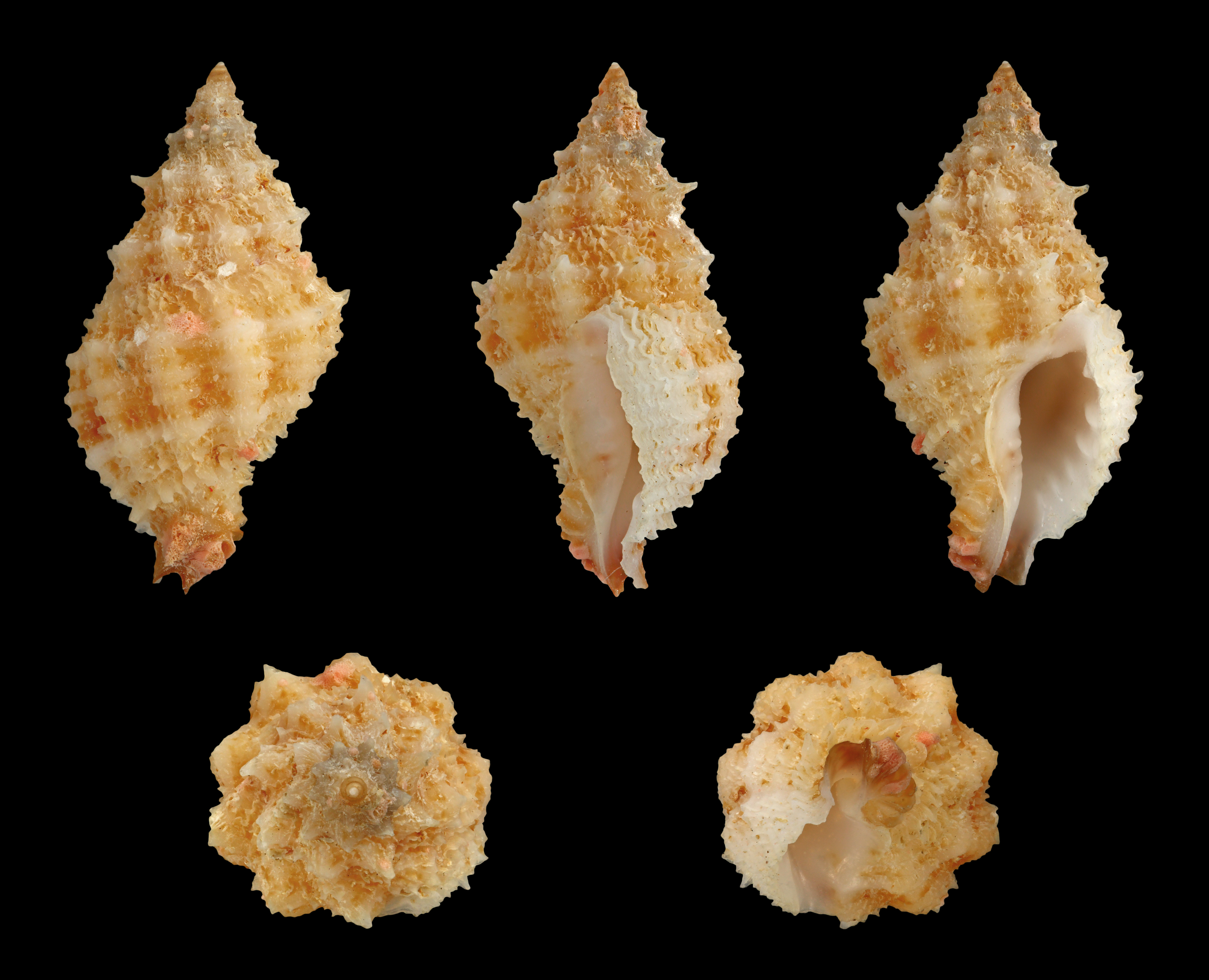

Scientific classification
- Kingdom: Animalia
- Phylum: Mollusca
- Class: Gastropoda
- Subclass: Caenogastropoda
- Order: Neogastropoda
- Family: Muricidae
- Genus: Orania
- Species: O. pacifica

Binomial name
- Orania pacifica (Nakayama, 1988)

Synonyms
- Morula pacifica Nakayama, 1988

= Orania pacifica =

Species of gastropod

Orania pacifica is a species of sea snail, a marine gastropod mollusk in the family Muricidae, the murex snails or rock snails.
