= Orania nodulosa =

Scientific classification
- Kingdom: Animalia
- Phylum: Mollusca
- Class: Gastropoda
- Subclass: Caenogastropoda
- Order: Neogastropoda
- Family: Muricidae
- Genus: Orania
- Species: O. nodulosa

Binomial name
- Orania nodulosa (Pease, 1869)

Synonyms
- Engina nodulosa Pease, 1869

Species of gastropod

Orania nodulosa is a species of sea snail, a marine gastropod mollusk in the family Muricidae, the murex snails or rock snails.
