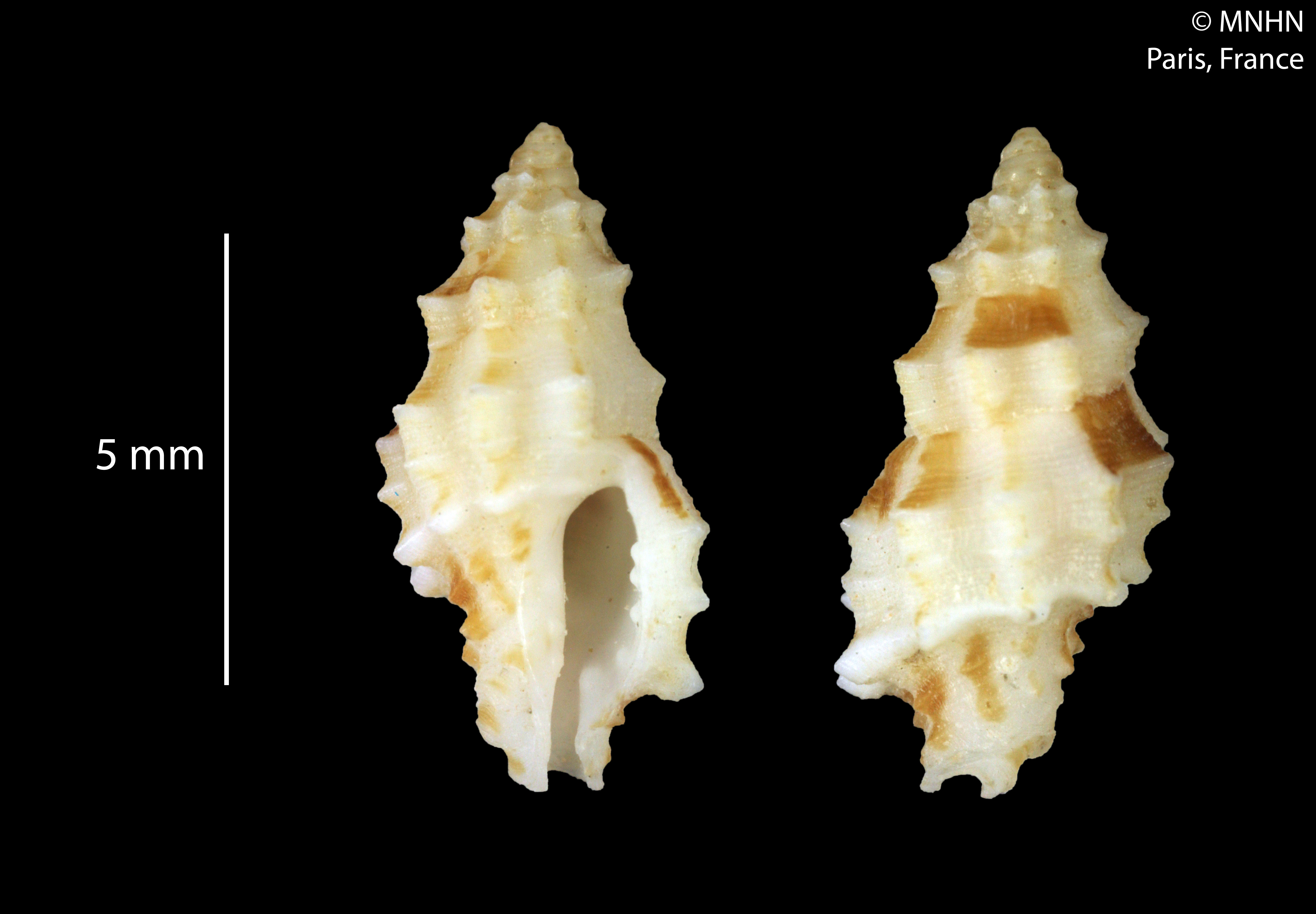
- Shell of Cytharomorula benedicta (specimen at MNHN, Paris)

Scientific classification
- Kingdom: Animalia
- Phylum: Mollusca
- Class: Gastropoda
- Subclass: Caenogastropoda
- Order: Neogastropoda
- Superfamily: Muricoidea
- Family: Muricidae
- Subfamily: Ergalataxinae
- Genus: Cytharomorula
- Species: C. benedicta

Binomial name
- Cytharomorula benedicta (Melvill & Standen, 1895)

Synonyms
- Murex (Ocinebra) benedictus Melvill & Standen, 1895

= Cytharomorula benedicta =

Species of gastropod

Cytharomorula benedicta is a species of sea snail, a marine gastropod mollusk, in the family Muricidae, the murex snails or rock snails.

== Distribution ==
This marine species occurs off the Loyalty Islands.
