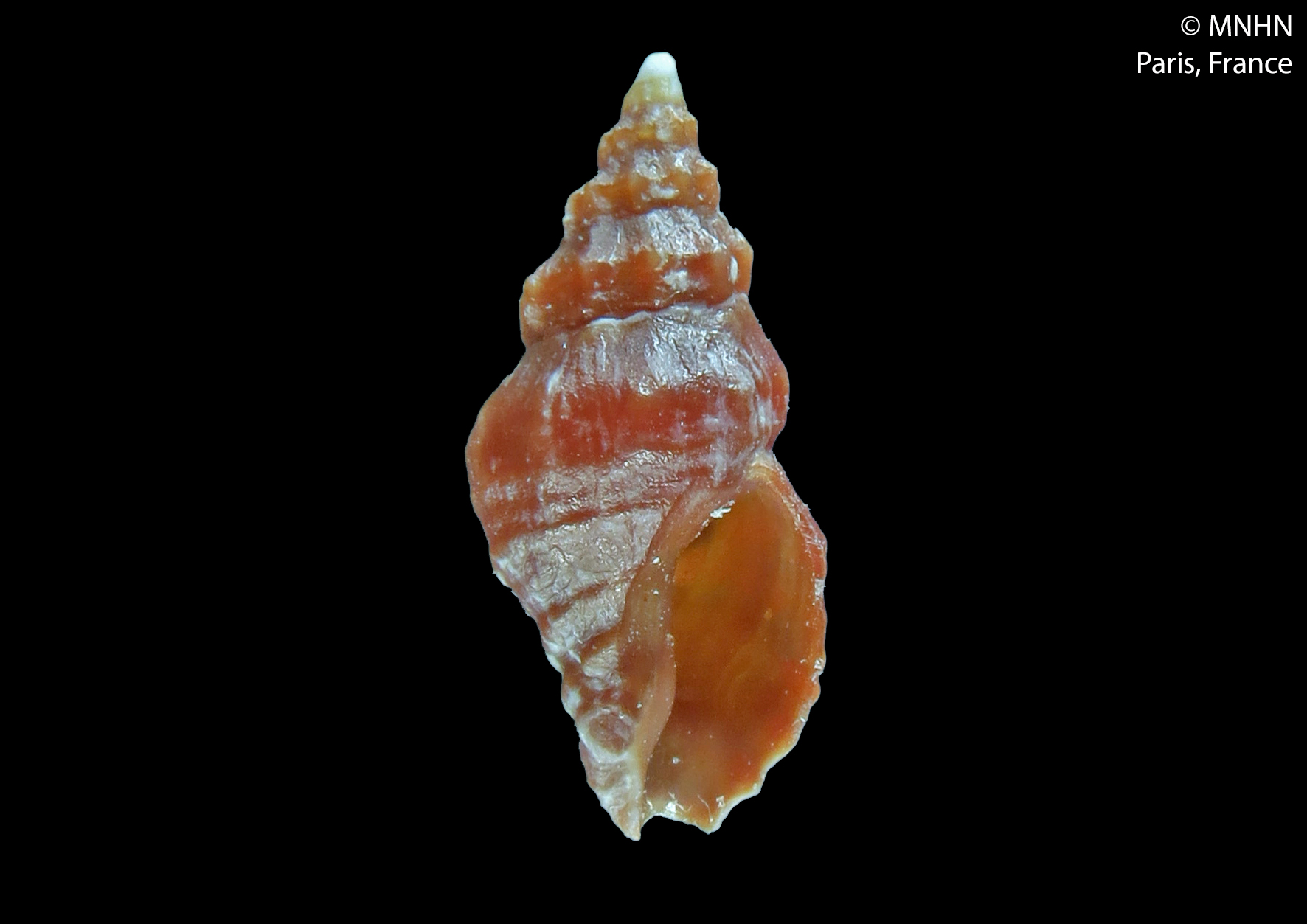
- Shell of Orania castanea (specimen at MNHN, Paris)

Scientific classification
- Kingdom: Animalia
- Phylum: Mollusca
- Class: Gastropoda
- Subclass: Caenogastropoda
- Order: Neogastropoda
- Superfamily: Muricoidea
- Family: Muricidae
- Subfamily: Ergalataxinae
- Genus: Orania
- Species: O. castanea

Binomial name
- Orania castanea (Küster, 1886)

Synonyms
- Cominella unifasciata G. B. Sowerby III, 1886; Cominella unifasciata concolor Sowerby, 1897; Cominella unifasciata nigronodulosa W. H. Turton, 1932; Nucella castanea (Küster, 1886); Purpura castanea Küster, 1886; Thais castanea (Küster, 1886)

= Orania castanea =

Species of gastropod

Orania castanea is a species of sea snail, a marine gastropod mollusk, in the family Muricidae, the murex snails or rock snails.

== Distribution ==
This marine species occurs off South Africa, from False Bay to the south coast of Natal, and Walters Shoals, south of Madagascar.
