= Bedevina birileffi =

Scientific classification
- Kingdom: Animalia
- Phylum: Mollusca
- Class: Gastropoda
- Subclass: Caenogastropoda
- Order: Neogastropoda
- Superfamily: Muricoidea
- Family: Muricidae
- Subfamily: Ergalataxinae
- Genus: Bedevina
- Species: B. birileffi

Binomial name
- Bedevina birileffi (Lischke, 1871)

Synonyms
- Bedeva birileffi (Lischke, 1871); Lataxiena birileffi (Lischke, 1871); Lepsiella birileffi (Lischke, 1871); Orania birileffi (Lischke, 1871); Trophon birileffi Lischke, 1871

Species of gastropod

Bedevina birileffi is a species of sea snail, a marine gastropod mollusk, in the family Muricidae, the murex snails or rock snails.
