= Orania pleurotomoides =

Scientific classification
- Kingdom: Animalia
- Phylum: Mollusca
- Class: Gastropoda
- Subclass: Caenogastropoda
- Order: Neogastropoda
- Family: Muricidae
- Genus: Orania
- Species: O. pleurotomoides

Binomial name
- Orania pleurotomoides (Reeve, 1845)

Synonyms
- Murex pleurotomoides Reeve, 1845

Species of gastropod

Orania pleurotomoides is a species of sea snail, a marine gastropod mollusk in the family Muricidae, the murex snails or rock snails.
