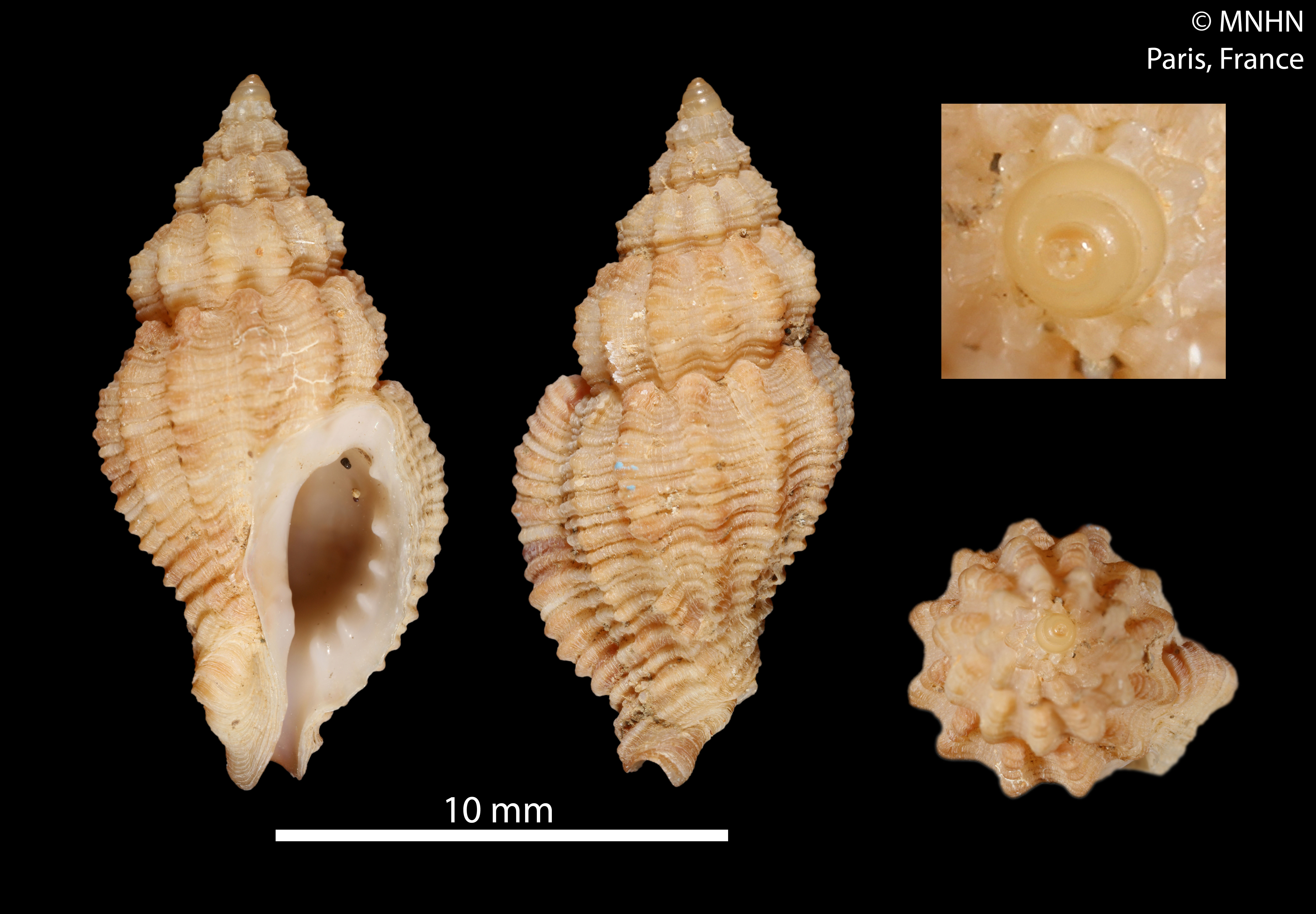
- Shell of Orania ornamentata (paratype at MNHN, Paris)

Scientific classification
- Kingdom: Animalia
- Phylum: Mollusca
- Class: Gastropoda
- Subclass: Caenogastropoda
- Order: Neogastropoda
- Family: Muricidae
- Genus: Cytharomorula
- Species: C. ornamentata

Binomial name
- Cytharomorula ornamentata Houart, 1995

Synonyms
- Orania ornamentata Houart, 1995 (original combination)

= Cytharomorula ornamentata =

Species of gastropod

Cytharomorula ornamentata is a species of sea snail, a marine gastropod mollusk in the family Muricidae, the murex snails or rock snails.

== Distribution ==
This marine species occurs off Natal, South Africa.
