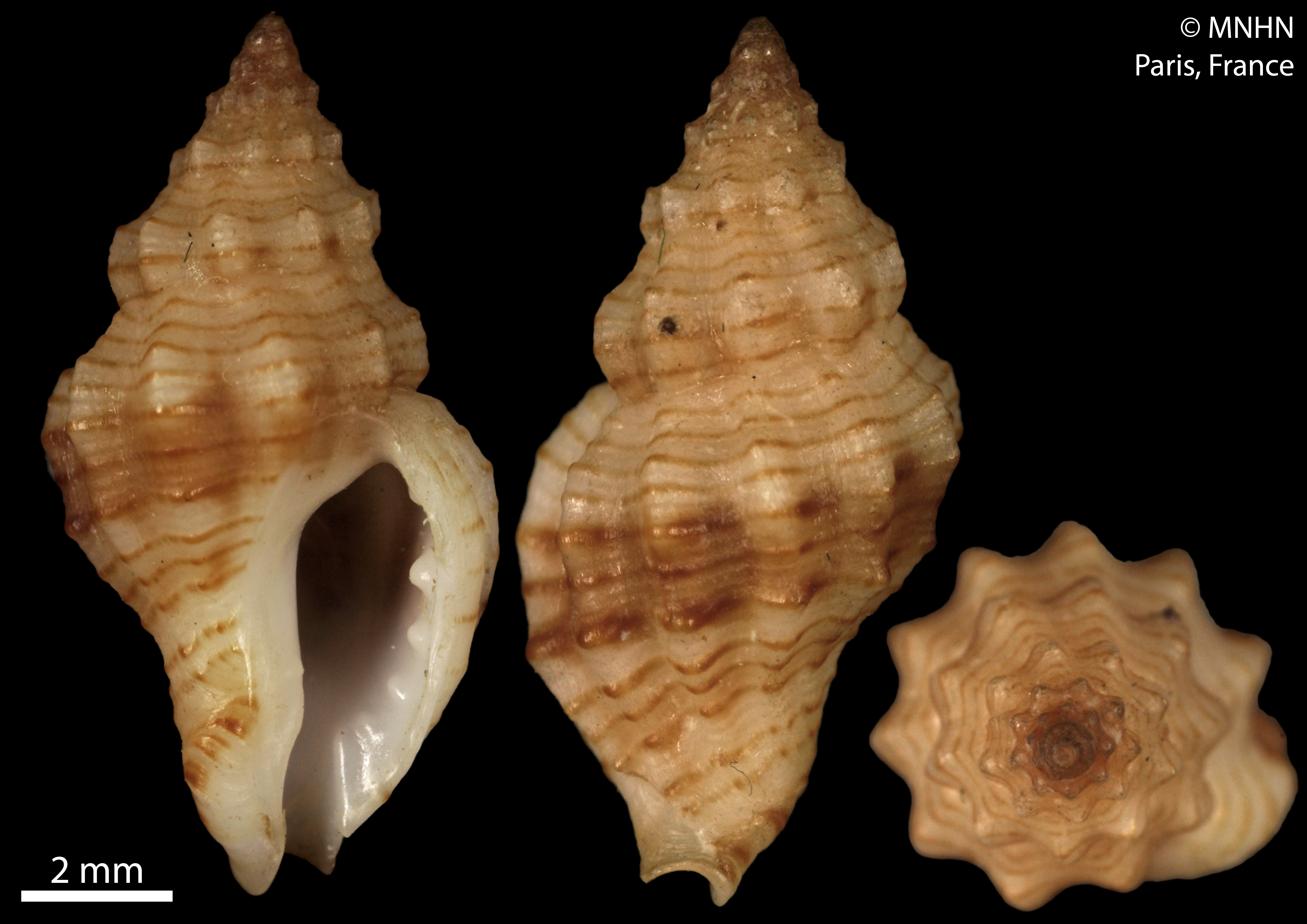

Scientific classification
- Kingdom: Animalia
- Phylum: Mollusca
- Class: Gastropoda
- Subclass: Caenogastropoda
- Order: Neogastropoda
- Family: Muricidae
- Genus: Cytharomorula
- Species: C. grayi

Binomial name
- Cytharomorula grayi (Dall, 1889)

Synonyms
- Cantharus (Tritonidea) laevis Smith, 1891; Nassarina grayi Dall, 1889; Trophon lowei Watson, 1897

= Cytharomorula grayi =

Species of gastropod

Cytharomorula grayi is a species of sea snail, a marine gastropod mollusc in the family Muricidae, commonly known as the murex snails or rock snails. The species was first described by William Healey Dall in 1889.

== Distribution ==
Western Atlantic Ocean: a deep water species, dredged off Barbados at 200 m. depth.
