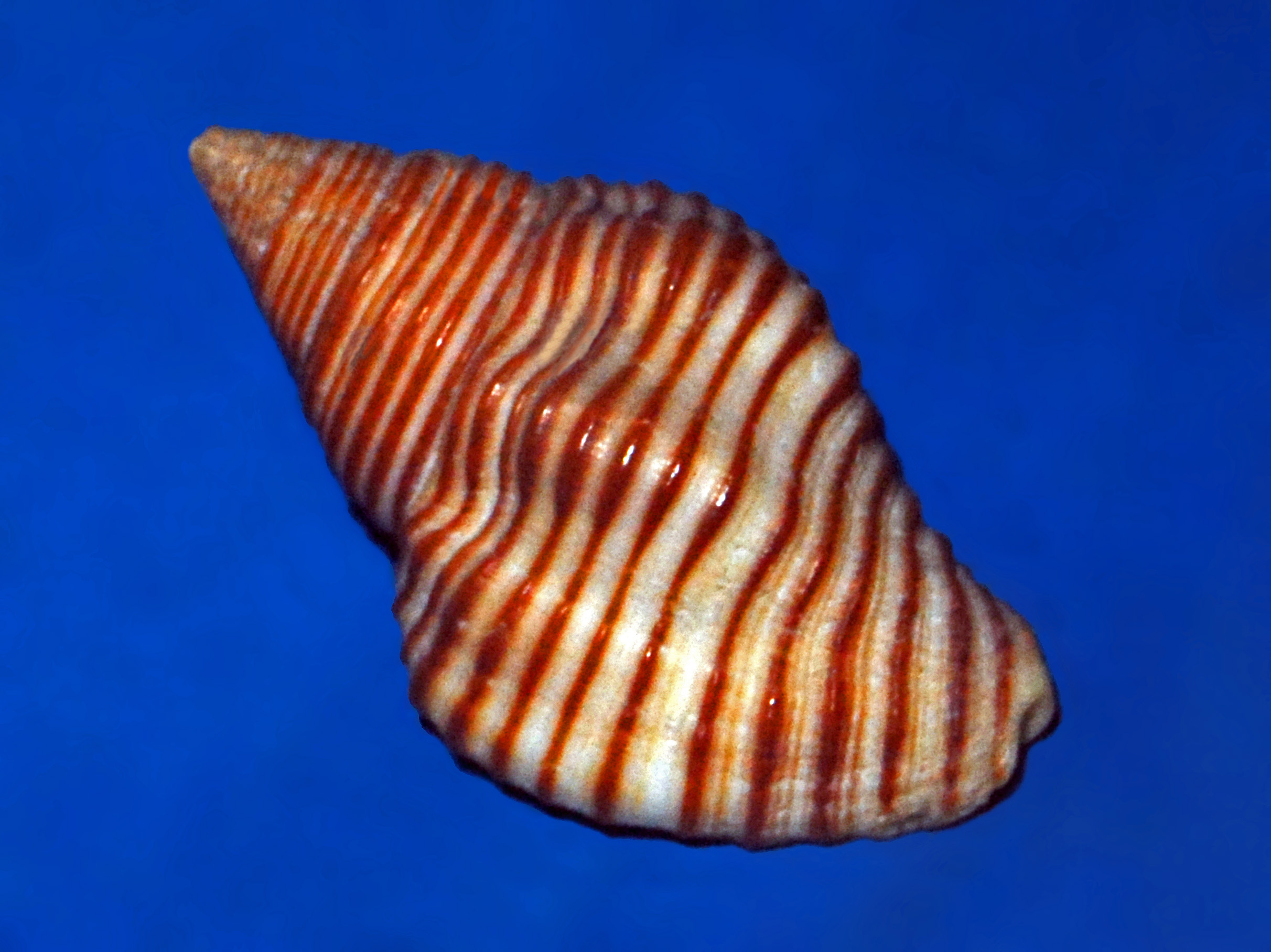
- Shell of Pollia undosa from New Zealand at the Museo Civico di Storia Naturale di Milano

Scientific classification
- Kingdom: Animalia
- Phylum: Mollusca
- Class: Gastropoda
- Subclass: Caenogastropoda
- Order: Neogastropoda
- Superfamily: Buccinoidea
- Family: Pisaniidae
- Genus: Pollia; Gray, 1834

Type species
- Buccinum undosum Linnaeus, 1758

Synonyms
- Buccinum (Pollia); Cantharus (Tritonidea) Swainson, 1840; † Cantharus Pollia Gray, 1834; Lagena Röding, 1798; Pisania (Tritonidea) Swainson, 1840 (superseded combination); Tritonidea Swainson, 1840; Tritonidia [sic] (incorrect subsequent spelling of Tritonidea Swainson, 1840)

= Pollia (gastropod) =

Genus of gastropods

Pollia is a genus of sea snails, marine gastropod mollusks in the family Pisaniidae.

== Species ==
According to the World Register of Marine Species (WoRMS) the following species with valid names are included within the genus Pollia :

- Pollia bednalli (G.B. Sowerby III, 1895)
- † Pollia bucklandi (d'Archiac, 1850)
- Pollia crenulata (Röding, 1798)
- Pollia delicata (E.A.Smith, 1899)
- † Pollia densestriata (K. Martin, 1931)
- † Pollia dubia (K. Martin, 1879) (accepted > unreplaced junior homonym, junior homonym of Buccinum dubium Pereira da Costa, 1866)
- † Pollia everwijni (K. Martin, 1906)
- Pollia fumosa (Dillwyn, 1817)
- Pollia fuscopicta (G.B. Sowerby III, 1905)
- Pollia imprimelata Fraussen & Rosado, 2011
- Pollia krauseri Tröndlé, 2013
- † Pollia martini Shuto, 1969
- Pollia mirabelmaxcencei Cossignani, 2017
- Pollia mollis (Gould, 1860)
- Pollia mondolonii Fraussen, 2012
- Pollia pellita Vermeij & Bouchet, 1998
- Pollia rawsoni (Melvill, 1897)
- Pollia rubens (Küster, 1858)
- Pollia rubiginosa (Reeve, 1846)
- † Pollia sondeiana (K. Martin, 1895)
- Pollia sowerbyana (Melvill & Standen, 1903)
- Pollia subcostata (Krauss, 1848)
- Pollia subrubiginosa (E.A.Smith, 1879) (synonym: Cantharus subrubiginosus Smith, 1879)
- Pollia undosa (Linnaeus, 1758)
- Pollia vermeuleni (Knudsen, 1980)
- Pollia wagneri (Anton, 1839)
- Pollia wrightae (Cernohorsky, 1974) (synonym: Cantharus wrightae Cernohorsky, 1974)
- † Pollia zweirzyckii (K. Martin, 1931)

Species brought into synonymy

- Pollia armata Coen, 1933: synonym of Pollia dorbignyi (Payraudeau, 1826)
- Pollia assimilis (Reeve, 1846): synonym of Aplus assimilis (Reeve, 1846)
- Pollia auritula (Link, 1807): synonym of Gemophos auritulus (Link, 1807)
- Pollia bicolor (Cantraine, 1835): synonym of Enginella leucozona (Philippi, 1844)
- Pollia campisii Ardovini, 2015: synonym of Aplus campisii (Ardovini, 2015) (original combination)
- Pollia coccinea Monterosato, 1884: synonym of Pollia dorbignyi (Payraudeau, 1826)
- Pollia coccinea Monterosato, 1884: synonym of Muricopsis cristata (Brocchi, 1814)
- Pollia coromandeliana (Lamarck, 1822): synonym of Gemophos auritulus (Link, 1807) (junior subjective synonym)
- Pollia dorbignyi (Payraudeau, 1826): synonym of Aplus dorbignyi (Payraudeau, 1826)
- Pollia fragaria (W. Wood, 1828): synonym of Clivipollia fragaria (W. Wood, 1828)
- Pollia fusulus: synonym of Orania fusulus (Brocchi, 1814)
- Pollia haemastoma Gray, 1839: synonym of Gemophos sanguinolentus (Duclos, 1833)
- Pollia incarnata (Deshayes, 1830): synonym of Clivipollia incarnata (Deshayes, 1834)
- Pollia insculpta (G.B. Sowerby III, 1900): synonym of Cancellopollia insculpta (Sowerby III, 1900)
- Pollia karinae (Nowell-Usticke, 1959): synonym of Hesperisternia karinae (Nowell-Usticke, 1959)
- Pollia lapugyensis Hoernes & Auinger, 1884: synonym of Pollia dorbignyi (Payraudeau, 1826)
- Pollia marmorata (Reeve, 1846): synonym of Prodotia iostoma (Gray, 1834)
- Pollia melanostoma (Sowerby I, 1825): synonym of Cantharus melanostoma (Sowerby I, 1825)
- Pollia moravica Hoernes & Auinger, 1884: synonym of Pollia dorbignyi (Payraudeau, 1826)
- Pollia multicostata Hoernes & Auinger, 1884: synonym of Pollia dorbignyi (Payraudeau, 1826)
- Pollia philippi Hoernes & Auinger, 1884: synonym of Pollia dorbignyi (Payraudeau, 1826)
- Pollia scabra Locard, 1886: synonym of Aplus scaber (Locard, 1891) (original combination)
- Pollia scacchiana (Philippi, 1844): synonym of Aplus scacchianus (Philippi, 1844)
- Pollia shepstonensis Tomlin, 1926: synonym of Prodotia shepstonensis (Tomlin, 1926)
- Pollia tincta Conrad, 1846: synonym of Gemophos tinctus (Conrad, 1846)
- Pollia viverratoides (d'Orbigny, 1840): synonym of Gemophos viverratoides (d'Orbigny, 1840)
