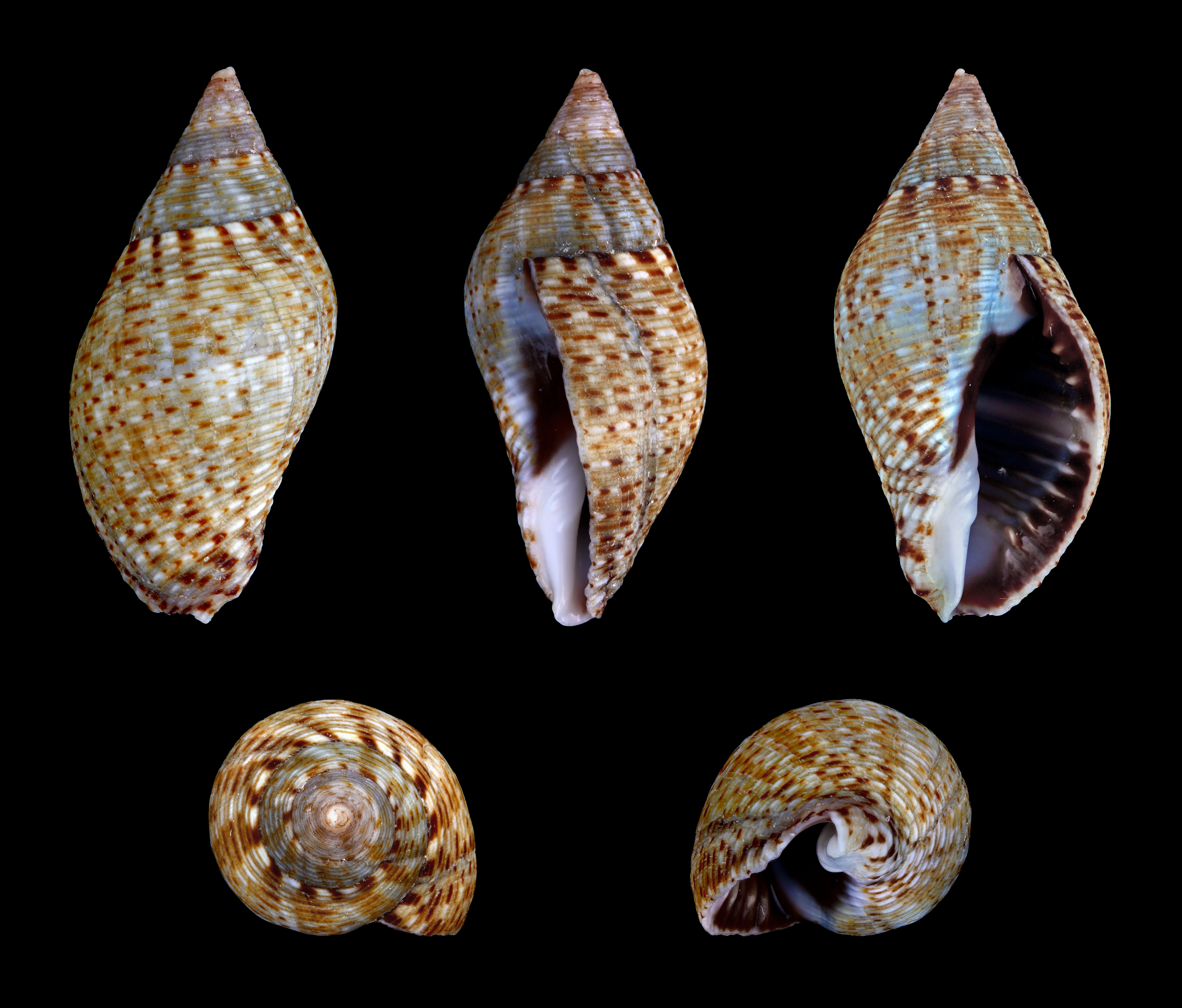
- Several representations of a shell of Pisania striata

Scientific classification
- Kingdom: Animalia
- Phylum: Mollusca
- Class: Gastropoda
- Subclass: Caenogastropoda
- Order: Neogastropoda
- Superfamily: Buccinoidea
- Family: Pisaniidae
- Genus: Pisania; Bivona-Bernardi, 1832

Type species
- Pisania striatula Bivona-Bernardi, A., 1832

Synonyms
- Appisania Thiele, 1929; Colubraria (Taeniola) Dall, 1904 (invalid: junior homonym of Taeniola Pallas, 1760 [Cestoda]); Fusus (Pisania) Bivona-Bernardi, 1832; Jeannea Iredale, 1912; Metula (Appisania) Thiele, 1929 junior subjective synonym; Pisania (Jeannea) Iredale, 1912 · accepted, alternate representation; Pisiana [sic] misspelling - incorrect subsequent spelling; Polliana Gray, 1850; Sukunaia Cernohorsky, 1966

= Pisania =

Genus of gastropods

Pisania is a genus of marine whelk in the family Pisaniidae. Some species prey on barnacles.

== Species ==
According to the World Register of Marine Species (WoRMS) species with accepted names within the genus Pisania include:

- Pisania angusta Smith, 1899
- Pisania costata Thiele, 1925
- Pisania decollata (G.B. Sowerby I, 1833)
- Pisania fasciculata (Reeve, 1846)
- Pisania gracilis (G.B. Sowerby II, 1859)
- Pisania hedleyi (Iredale, 1912)
- Pisania hermannseni A. Adams, 1855
- † Pisania hermonvillensis Cossmann, 1913
- Pisania jenningsi (Cernohorsky, 1966)
- Pisania lirocincta G.B. Sowerby III, 1910
- Pisania luctuosa Tapparone-Canefri, 1880
- † Pisania magna Foresti, 1868
- † Pisania mariavictoriae Brunetti & Della Bella, 2016
- † Pisania plicatula (Deshayes, 1835)
- † Pisania plioangustata Sacco, 1904
- Pisania pusio (Linnaeus, 1758)
- † Pisania redoniensis Landau, Ceulemans & Van Dingenen, 2019
- Pisania rosadoi Bozzetti & Ferrario, 2005
- Pisania scholvieni Rolle, 1892
- Pisania solomonensis E.A.Smith, 1876
- Pisania striata (Gmelin, 1791)
- † Pisania subdiscolor H. Woodward, 1879
- Pisania sugimotoi (Habe, 1968)
- Pisania tritonoides (Reeve, 1846)
- 'Pisania unicolor (Angas, 1876)

Taxon inquirendum

- Pisania amphodon van Martens, 1880
- Pisania strigata Pease, 1863

The Shell-bearing Mollusca database also adds the following names

- Pisania brevialaxe T. Kuroda & T. Habe, 1961 Australia
- Pisania grimaldii Ph. Dautzenberg, 1889 Australia

Synonymized species

- Pisania aequilirata Carpenter, 1857: synonym of Pusio elegans (Gray in Griffith & Pidgeon, 1833)
- Pisania auritula Link, 1807 East America : synonym of Gemophos auritulus (Link, 1807)
- Pisania australis W. H. Pease, 1871 Australia: synonym of Engina australis (Pease, 1871)
- † Pisania baetica Lozano-Francisco & Vera-Peláez, 2006 : synonym of † Pisania magna Foresti, 1868
- Pisania bednalli G. B. Sowerby III, 1895: synonym of Pollia bednalli (G. B. Sowerby III, 1895) (original combination)
- Pisania bernardoi Costa & dos Santos Gomes, 1998: synonym of Dianthiphos bernardoi (Costa & Gomes, 1998)
- Pisania bilirata (Reeve, 1846): synonym of Caducifer biliratus (Reeve, 1846) (superseded combination)
- Pisania billeheusti Petit, 1946 Hawaiian Islands: synonym of Prodotia iostoma (Gray, 1834)
- Pisania cingulata (Reeve, 1846): synonym of Japeuthria cingulata (Reeve, 1846)
- Pisania cingulatum(sic): synonym of Japeuthria cingulata (Reeve, 1846)
- Pisania clathrata Dautzenberg & Fischer, 1906 Morocco: synonym of Pisanianura grimaldii (Dautzenberg, 1899)
- Pisania crenilabrum A. Adams, 1855: synonym of Pisania fasciculata (Reeve, 1846)
- Pisania crocata (Reeve, 1846): synonym of Prodotia crocata (Reeve, 1846)
- Pisania dorbignyi Payraudeau, 1826: synonym of Pollia dorbignyi (Payraudeau, 1826): synonym of Aplus dorbignyi (Payraudeau, 1826)
- Pisania englerti Hertlein, 1960: synonym of Caducifer englerti (Hertlein, 1960)
- Pisania ferrea (L. A. Reeve, 1847) Indo-Pacific: synonym of Japeuthria ferrea (Reeve, 1847)
- Pisania flavescens Hutton, 1884: synonym of Buccinulum vittatum vittatum (Quoy & Gaimard, 1833) represented as Buccinulum vittatum (Quoy & Gaimard, 1833)
- Pisania fortis Carpenter, 1866: synonym of †Pusio fortis (Carpenter, 1866) (original combination)
- Pisania gaskelli Melvill, 1891 : synonym of Orania gaskelli (Melvill, 1891)
- Pisania gracilis (Reeve, 1846): synonym of Prodotia lannumi (Schwengel, 1950)
- Pisania ignea (Gmelin, 1790): synonym of Ecmanis ignea (Gmelin, 1791)
- Pisania janeirensis (Philippi, 1849): synonym of Pisania pusio (Linnaeus, 1758)
- Pisania karinae (Nowell-Usticke, 1959): synonym of Hesperisternia karinae (Nowell-Usticke, 1959)
- Pisania laevigata Bivona-Bernardi, 1832: synonym of Mitrella scripta (Linnaeus, 1758)
- Pisania maculosa (Lamarck, 1822): synonym of Pisania striata (Gmelin, 1791)
- † Pisania media Hutton, 1885 : synonym of † Buccinulum medium (Hutton, 1885)
- Pisania mollis A. A. Gould, 1860 Indo-Pacific: synonym of Pollia mollis (Gould, 1860) (original combination)
- Pisania montrouzieri Crosse, 1862: synonym of Pisania fasciculata (Reeve, 1846)
- Pisania naevosa Martens, 1880: synonym of Prodotia naevosa (Martens, 1880) (original combination); synonym of Sinetectula naevosa (E. von Martens, 1880) (original combination)
- Pisania nodulosa Bivona Ant., 1832: synonym of Pollia dorbignyi (Payraudeau, 1826)
- Pisania orbignyi [sic]: synonym of Aplus dorbignyi (Payraudeau, 1826) (incorrect subsequent spelling of dorbignyi (Payraudeau, 1826))
- † Pisania plioalboranensis Lozano-Francisco & Vera-Peláez, 2006 : synonym of † Pisania plioangustata Sacco, 1904
- Pisania reticulata A. Adams, 1855: synonym of Cumia mestayerae (Iredale, 1915) (invalid: secondary homonym of Colubraria or Cumia reticulata (Blainville, 1829); Fusus mestayerae is a replacement name)
- Pisania rubiginosa Reeve, 1846: synonym of Pollia rubiginosa (Reeve, 1846)
- Pisania schoutanica May, 1910 synonym of Fusus schoutanicus (May, 1910)
- Pisania striatula Bivona-Bernardi, 1832: synonym of Pisania striata (Gmelin, 1791)
- Pisania tinctus (T. A. Conrad, 1846) East America: synonym of Gemophos tinctus (Conrad, 1846)÷
- Pisania townsendi Melvill, 1918: synonym of Prodotia townsendi (Melvill, 1918)
- † Pisania transsylvanica (Hoernes & Auinger, 1884): synonym of † Hilda transsylvanica (R. Hoernes & Auinger, 1884) (superseded combination)
- Pisania truncatus Hinds, 1844: synonym of Caducifer truncatus (Hinds, 1844)
