= Cantharus =

Cantharus may refer to:

- Cantharus (Christianity), a fountain used by Christians for making ablutions
- Kantharos (also spelled cantharus), a Greek drinking cup
- Kantharos (also spelled Cantharus), an ancient Athenian comic poet
- Kantharos (also spelled Cantharus), a harbour in ancient Athens
- Sea snails in the family Pisaniidae, including:
  - Cantharus, a genus of sea snails
  - Common cantharus (Gemophos auritulus)
  - Measle-mouth cantharus (Gemophos sanguinolentus)
  - Ringed cantharus (Gemophos ringens)
  - Tinted or painted cantharus (Gemophos tinctus)
  - Ribbed cantharus (Hesperisternia multangula)
