= Gaudy cantharus =

Gaudy cantharus may refer to the following sea snail species in the family Pisaniidae:

- Engina lauta
- Gemophos auritulus
