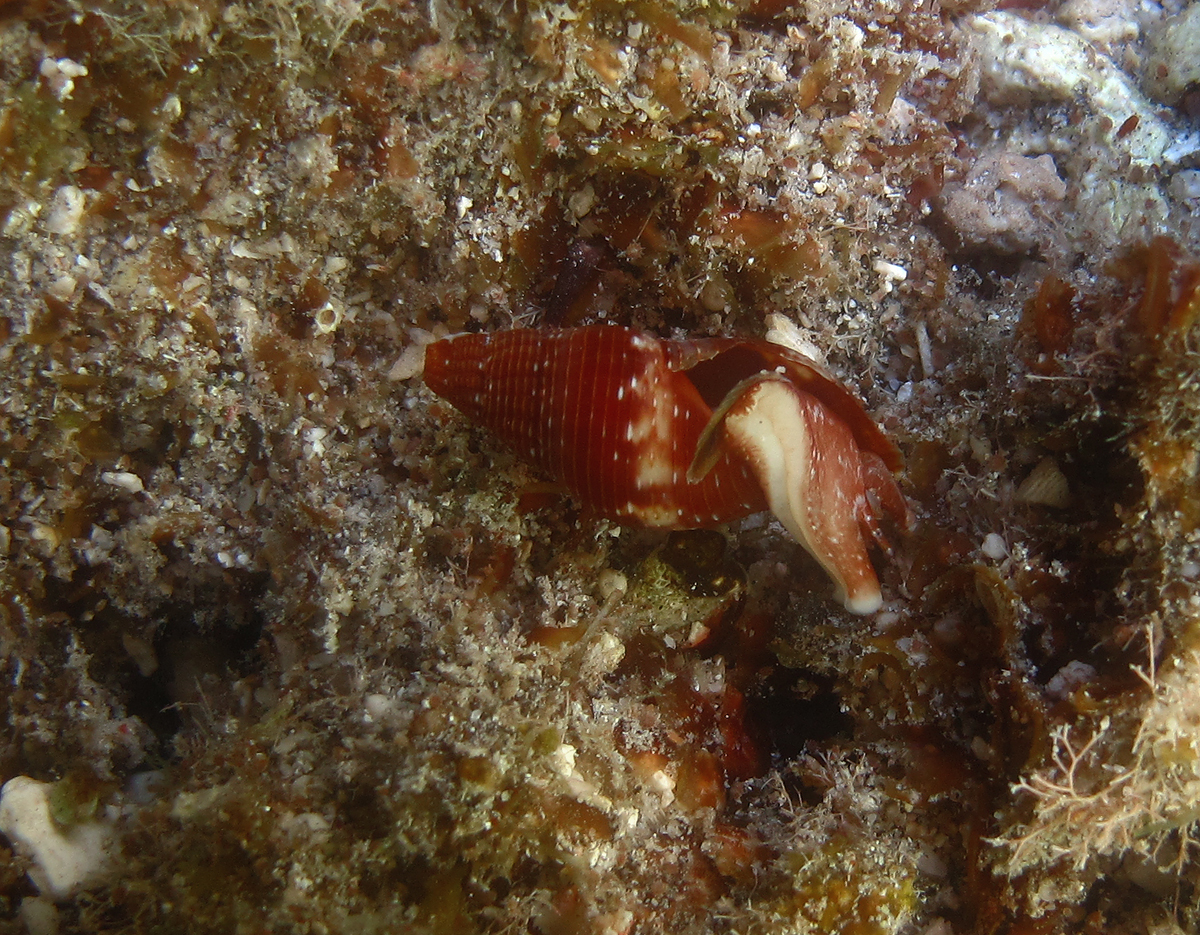
- a live animal of Pisania luctuosa
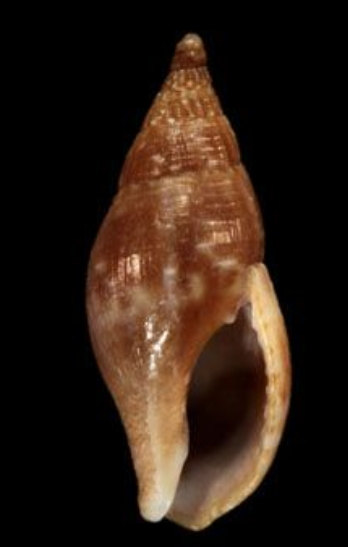
- Shell of Pisania luctuosa (specimen at the Natural History Museum, Rotterdam)

Scientific classification
- Kingdom: Animalia
- Phylum: Mollusca
- Class: Gastropoda
- Subclass: Caenogastropoda
- Order: Neogastropoda
- Family: Pisaniidae
- Genus: Pisania
- Species: P. luctuosa

Binomial name
- Pisania luctuosa Tapparone-Canefri, 1877

Synonyms
- Buccinum luctuosum Tapparone Canefri, 1880 (original combination)

= Pisania luctuosa =

Species of gastropod

Pisania luctuosa is a species of sea snail, a marine gastropod mollusk in the family Pisaniidae.

== Description ==
The shell is moderately small, measuring between 12 and 20 mm in length. It possesses a slender, elongated shape where the total width accounts for 42% to 48% of its overall length. In color, the shell ranges from a deep blackish-brown to a dark purple-black. It is elegantly ornamented with a narrow, white peripheral band that runs across the body whorl, from which short white lines extend upward toward the suture. On the penultimate (second-to-last) whorl, small white spots are occasionally visible right at the suture line.

An adult specimen features a teleoconch (post-larval shell) of 3.5 to 4.5 mature whorls, with a protoconch (embryonic shell) consisting of a single turn that is immersed within the teleoconch itself. In juvenile specimens, however, the teleoconch displays 5 mature whorls, while the protoconch consists of 3 brown, axially striate nuclear whorls with an initially white first turn.

The surface is finely sculptured with numerous, irregular spiral striae (fine grooves), numbering 16 to 23 on the penultimate whorl and 36 to 50 on the main body whorl. Some of these spiral lines are noticeably more prominent than others, and the earliest whorls are costate (ribbed).

The aperture is narrow, elliptical, and equal to or longer in height than the spire. Internally, it glows with a bluish-white or light violet hue. The outer lip is externally thickened and lined internally with 13 to 16 white denticles (tooth-like structures). The first 2 or 3 posterior denticles are particularly thickened and project outward, while the remaining denticles become progressively smaller as they approach the siphonal canal.

The columella is calloused toward the front and has a purplish-brown coloration. The parietal wall features a distinct denticle, and the anterior portion of the columella displays a blunt, projecting, notch-like tooth. The siphonal canal itself is short but clearly distinct.

The operculum is corneous (horn-like) and yellowish-brown, marked by a dark brown axial zone and a basal, though somewhat indistinct, nucleus.

The central rachidian teeth of the radula (the snail's ribbon of teeth) are shortly rectangular with a concave base and 5 sharp cusps. The lateral teeth closely resemble those of Pisania fasciculata, characterized by a massive, inward-pointing inner cusp of variable length, a small and distinct (or nearly obsolete) central cusp, and a short, hooked back cusp.

Clear sexual dimorphism is evident within the radulae of this species; females possess an appreciably shorter and narrower odontophore (the cartilage supporting the teeth), but they make up for it by carrying significantly more rows of teeth than their male counterparts.

When alive, the creature itself is quite striking. The dorsal side of its foot is a creamy white heavily mottled with blackish-brown, contrasting beautifully with the sole of the foot, which is a pure, iridescent creamy white. Finally, it extends a remarkably long siphon that is tinted a delicate shade of pink.

== Distribution ==
Pisania luctuosa is similar to Pisania fasciculata (Reeve, 1846), with which species it is sympatric in Fiji and Mauritius, without any integrading specimens having been encountered.
