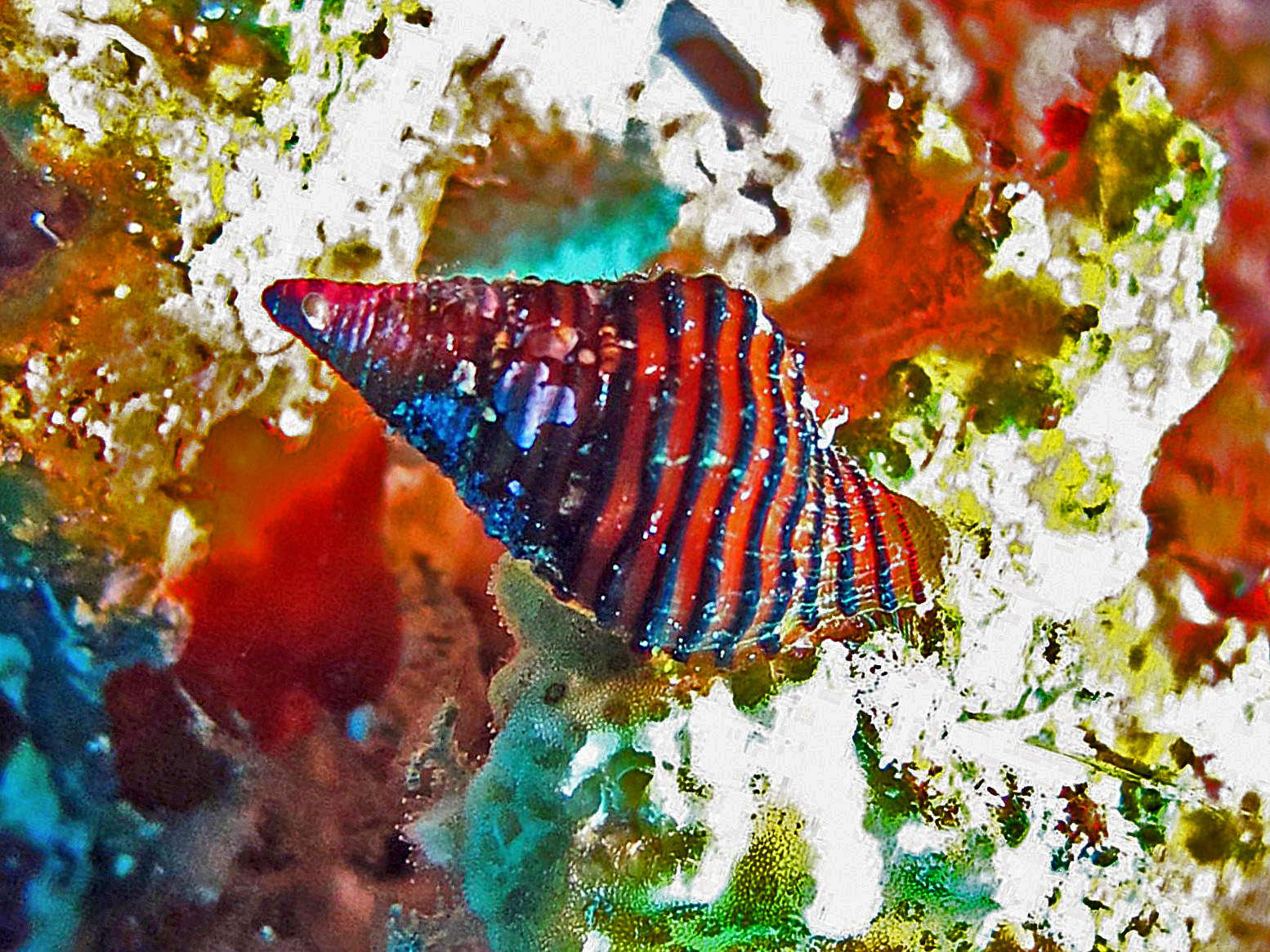
- Live specimen of Pollia undosa, in Bunaken, Sulawesi
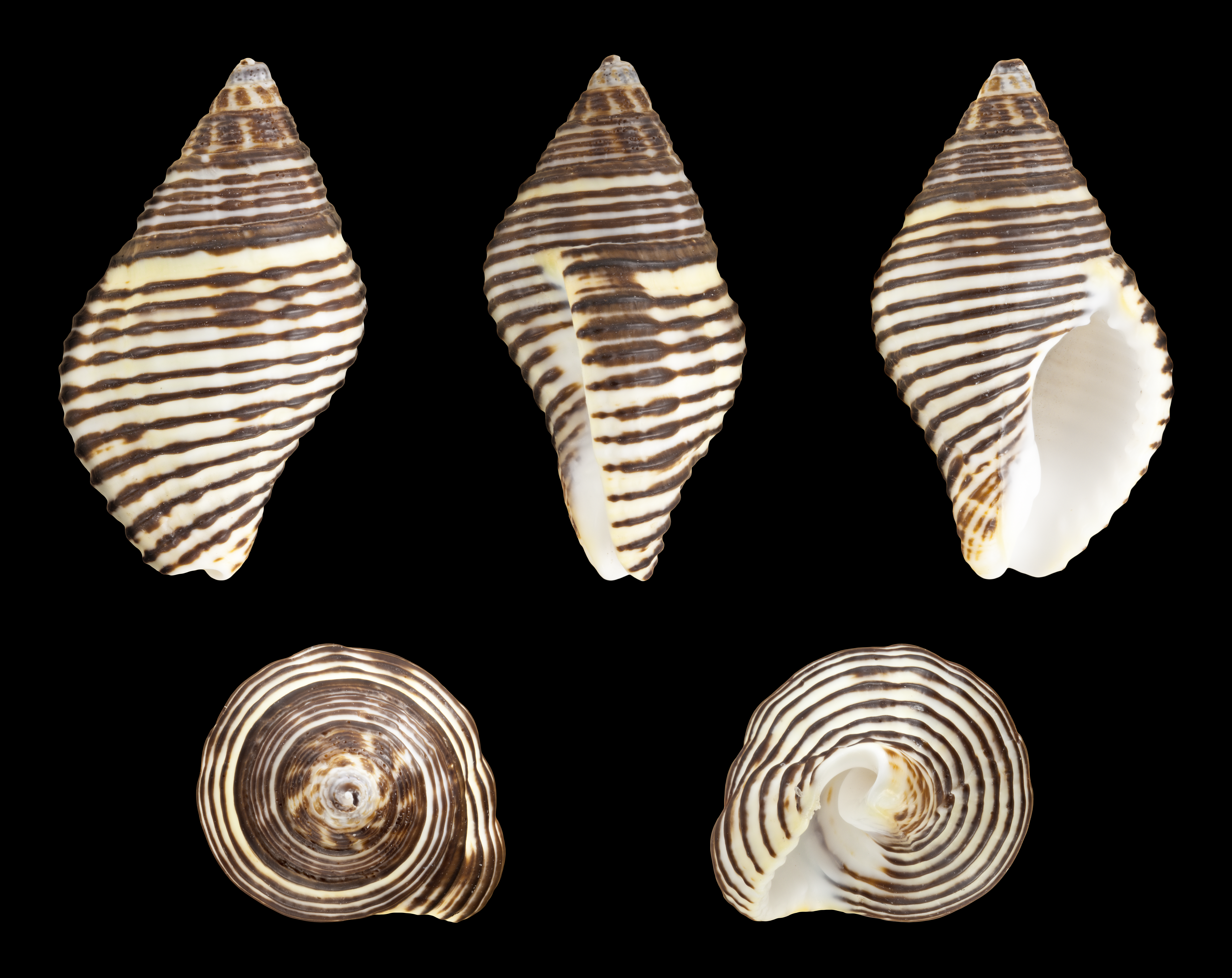
- Shell of Pollia undosa

Scientific classification
- Kingdom: Animalia
- Phylum: Mollusca
- Class: Gastropoda
- Subclass: Caenogastropoda
- Order: Neogastropoda
- Family: Pisaniidae
- Genus: Pollia
- Species: P. undosa

Binomial name
- Pollia undosa (Linnaeus, 1758)

Synonyms
- Buccinum undosum Linnaeus, 1758; Cantharus undosus (Linnaeus, 1758); Tritonidea undosa (Linnaeus, 1758)

= Pollia undosa =

Species of gastropod

Pollia undosa, common name : the waved goblet, is a species of sea snail, a marine gastropod mollusk in the family Pisaniidae, the true whelks.

== Description ==
The shell size varies between 20 mm and 45 mm, with the average size ranging from 35 mm to 40 mm. Usually the shell has dark brown ribs and orange background, but there are several different variations of color. It is an active hunter of other molluscs, feeding on snails, slugs, mussels and clams.

The ovate, bi-conic shell is quite thick and solid. It is of a reddish white, and covered with a brown, velvety epidermis. The six whorls are moderate, pretty distinct, and provided with decurrent, subnodulous striae, of a brownish or blackish red. The intervals are white, and furnished with very fine striae scarcely apparent. The body whorl is much larger than all the others together, and has five or six thick, obtuse longitudinal folds of ribs, which are rarely continued as far as the base of the shell, and oftentimes form only tubercles, particularly in old shells. The aperture is ovate, elongated, whitish, and bordered with yellow. The siphonal canal is slightly prolonged, emargination slight and oblique. The outer lip, which is thickened by age, is denticulated throughout its whole length, and furrowed internally. The columella is wrinkled and covered at its base with a thin, raised callosity.

In large specimens of P. undosa the shell is strongly spirally corded, without axial ribs, and the labial lip is angulate posteriorly. Small specimens of P. undosa are frequently axially costate all the way to the body whorl, and the labial lip is regularly convex. These specimens can be separated from Pollia fumosa (Dillwyn, 1817) only with difficulty. The radula has laterals with a serrated inner cusp.

== Distribution ==
This marine species occurs in the Red Sea, in the Indian Ocean off Aldabra, Chagos and Tanzania and in the Western Pacific Ocean (French Polynesia). This species mainly inhabits reef and lagoons but it is widespread in a variety of different habitats.
