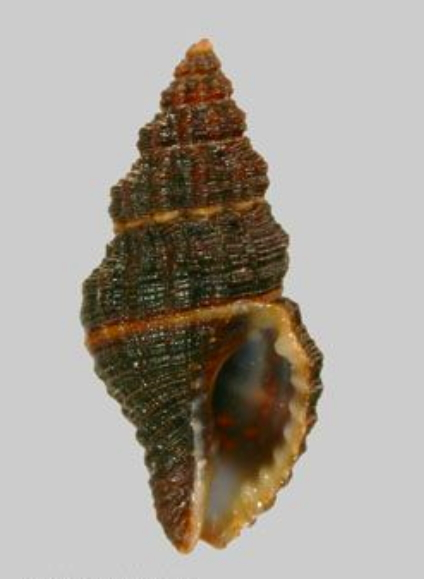
- Shell of Aplus gaillardoti (specimen at the Natural History Museum Rotterdam)

Scientific classification
- Kingdom: Animalia
- Phylum: Mollusca
- Class: Gastropoda
- Subclass: Caenogastropoda
- Order: Neogastropoda
- Family: Pisaniidae
- Genus: Aplus
- Species: A. gaillardoti

Binomial name
- Aplus gaillardoti (Puton, 1856)
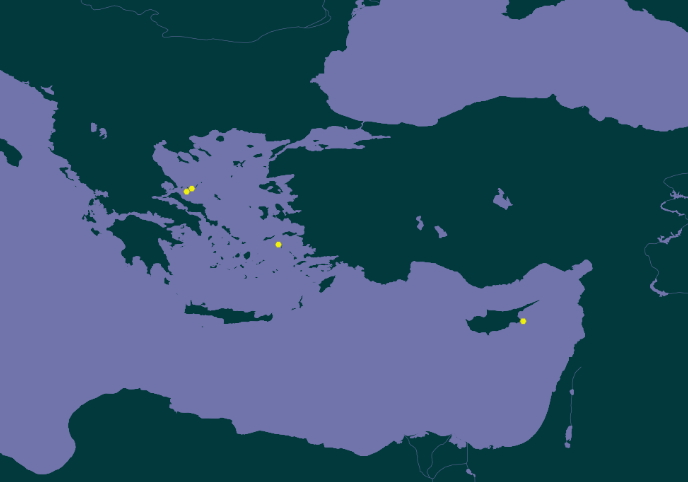

Synonyms
- Buccinum gaillardoti Puton, 1856 (original combination); Pisania dorbignyi var. gaillardoti (Puton, 1856) superseded rank

= Aplus gaillardoti =

Species of gastropod

Aplus gaillardoti, common name the similar buccinum, is a species of sea snail, a marine gastropod mollusc in the family Pisaniidae.

== Description ==
The length of the shell attains 16 mm, its diameter is 8 mm.

== Distribution ==
This marine species occurs in the Eastern Mediterranean Sea.
