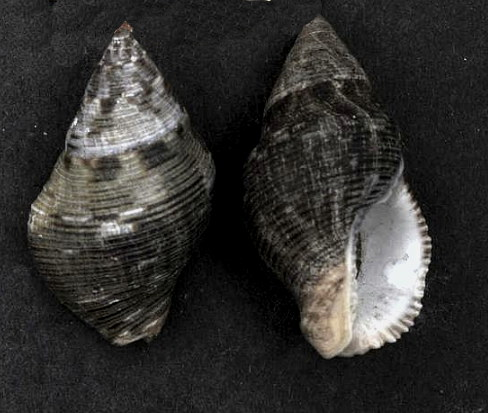
- Gemophos viverratus

Scientific classification
- Kingdom: Animalia
- Phylum: Mollusca
- Class: Gastropoda
- Subclass: Caenogastropoda
- Order: Neogastropoda
- Family: Pisaniidae
- Genus: Gemophos (Kiener, 1834)

Type species
- Buccinum gemmatum Reeve, 1846

Synonyms
- Cantharus (Gemophos) Olsson & Harbison, 1953

= Gemophos =

Genus of gastropods

Gemophos is a genus of sea snails, marine gastropod mollusks in the family Pisaniidae.

== Species ==
Species within the genus Gemophos include:

- Gemophos auritulus (Link, 1807)
- Gemophos filistriatus Vermeij, 2001
- Gemophos gemmatus (Reeve, 1846)
- Gemophos inca (d' Orbigny, 1839)
- Gemophos janellii (Valenciennes, 1846)
- Gemophos pacei Petuch & Sargent, 2011
- Gemophos pastinaca (Reeve, 1846)
- Gemophos ringens (Reeve, 1846)
- Gemophos sanguinolentus (Duclos, 1833)
- Gemophos tinctus (Conrad, 1846)
- Gemophos viverratoides (d'Orbigny, 1840)
- Gemophos viverratus (Kiener, 1834)
