= Pollia vermeuleni =

Scientific classification
- Kingdom: Animalia
- Phylum: Mollusca
- Class: Gastropoda
- Subclass: Caenogastropoda
- Order: Neogastropoda
- Family: Pisaniidae
- Genus: Pollia
- Species: P. vermeuleni

Binomial name
- Pollia vermeuleni (Knudsen, 1980)

Synonyms
- Cantharus vermeuleni Knudsen, 1980

Species of gastropod

Pollia vermeuleni is a species of sea snail, a marine gastropod mollusk in the family Pisaniidae, the true whelks.
