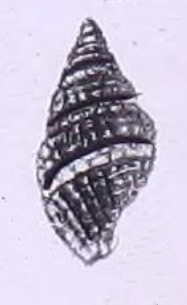
- Original drawing of Aplus nodulosus (holotype)

Scientific classification
- Kingdom: Animalia
- Phylum: Mollusca
- Class: Gastropoda
- Subclass: Caenogastropoda
- Order: Neogastropoda
- Family: Pisaniidae
- Genus: Aplus
- Species: A. nodulosus

Binomial name
- Aplus nodulosus (Bivona e Bernardi, 1832)

Synonyms
- Pisania nodulosa Bivona e Bernardi, 1832 (original combination)

= Aplus nodulosus =

Species of gastropod

Aplus nodulosus, common name the similar buccinum, is a species of sea snail, a marine gastropod mollusc in the family Pisaniidae.

== Description ==
(Original description in Italian) The oval shell is nearly fusiform. It is sculptured with nodulous longitudinal folds and fine transverse striae. The whorls of the spire are slightly angulate. The columella bears an upper fold and two or three faint transverse folds below.

== Distribution ==
This marine species occurs in the Mediterranean Sea (Spain, Cyprus)
