= Aplus coccineus =

Scientific classification
- Kingdom: Animalia
- Phylum: Mollusca
- Class: Gastropoda
- Subclass: Caenogastropoda
- Order: Neogastropoda
- Family: Pisaniidae
- Genus: Aplus
- Species: A. coccineus

Binomial name
- Aplus coccineus (Monterosato, 1884)

Synonyms
- Anna scabra (Locard, 1892); Aplus campisii (Ardovini, 2015); Aplus scaber (Locard, 1891) junior subjective synonym; Cantharus scaber (Locard, 1892); Cantharus scaber unicolor Nordsieck, 1972 (dubious synonym); Pollia campisii Ardovini, 2015 junior subjective synonym; Pollia coccinea Monterosato, 1884; Pollia scabra Locard, 1891 (original combination)

Species of gastropod

Aplus coccineus is a species of sea snail, a marine gastropod mollusk in the family Pisaniidae.

== Description ==
The length of the shell attains 16 mm.

(Original description in Italian) The sculpture of the shell shows more widely spaced ribs and more prominent spiral lines. The siphonal canal is shorter and more open. The columella is distinctly tuberculate.

== Distribution ==
This marine species occurs off Italy.
