= Pisania rosadoi =

Scientific classification
- Kingdom: Animalia
- Phylum: Mollusca
- Class: Gastropoda
- Subclass: Caenogastropoda
- Order: Neogastropoda
- Family: Pisaniidae
- Genus: Pisania
- Species: P. rosadoi

Binomial name
- Pisania rosadoi Bozzetti & Ferrario, 2005

Species of gastropod

Pisania rosadoi is a species of sea snail, a marine gastropod mollusk in the family Pisaniidae.

== Distribution ==
The snail has been observed off the coast of Mozambique.
