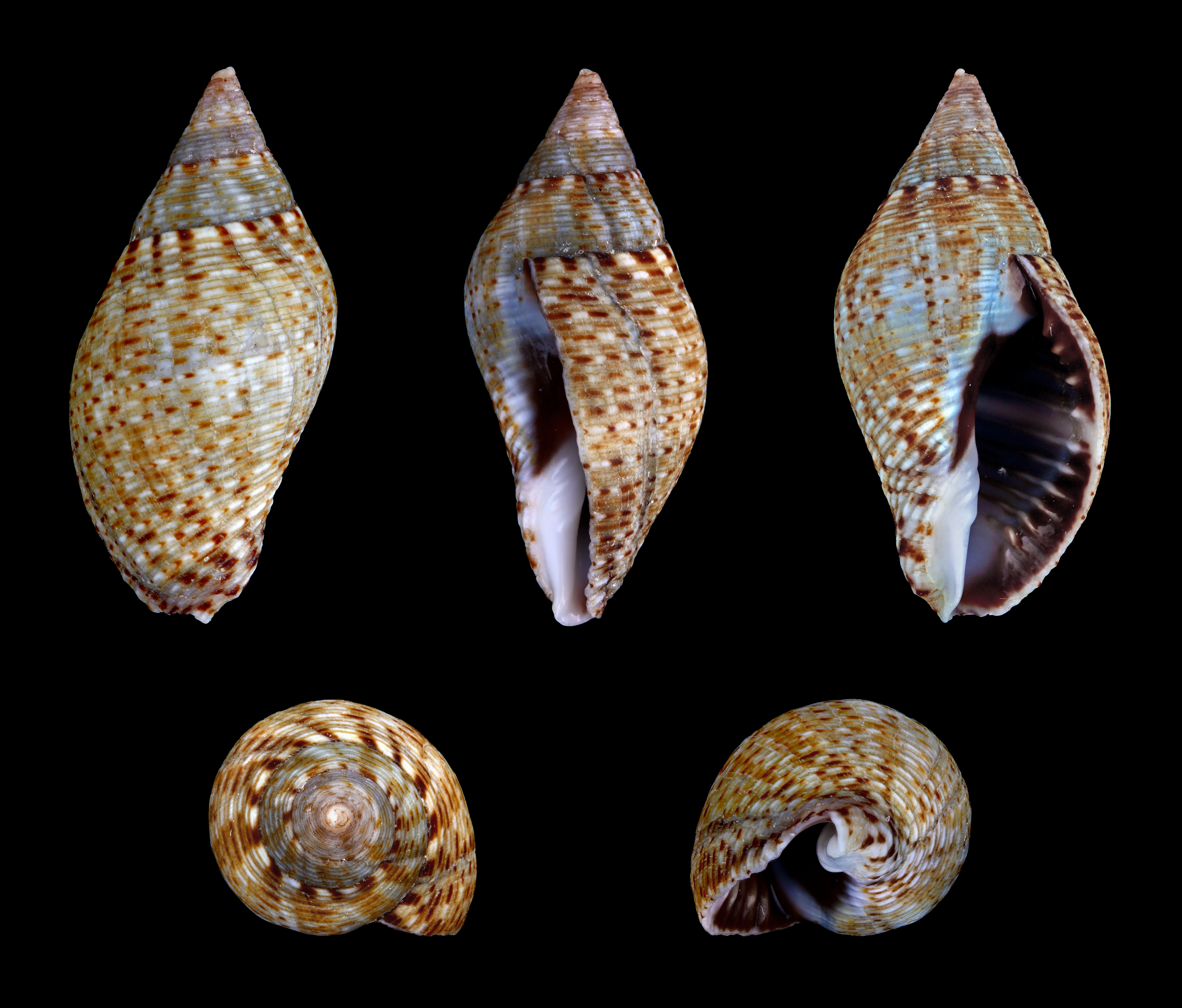
- Five views of a shell of Pisania striata

Scientific classification
- Kingdom: Animalia
- Phylum: Mollusca
- Class: Gastropoda
- Subclass: Caenogastropoda
- Order: Neogastropoda
- Family: Pisaniidae
- Genus: Pisania
- Species: P. striata

Binomial name
- Pisania striata (Gmelin, 1791)

Synonyms
- Buccinum maculosum Lamarck, 1822; Pisania maculosa (Lamarck, 1822); Pisania maculosa var. elongata Pallary, 1900; Pisania maculosa var. fasciata Pallary, 1900; Pisania maculosa var. obesa Pallary, 1900; † Pisania striata var. pliobrevis Sacco, 1904 (dubious synonym); Pisania striata var. trigonostoma Pallary, 1912; Pisania striatula Bivona-Bernardi, 1832; Purpura variegata Schubert & Wagner, 1829; Purpura variegata Risso, 1826; Voluta gualtierii Scacchi, 1832; Voluta striata Gmelin, 1791; Voluta syracusana Gmelin, 1791

= Pisania striata =

Species of gastropod

Pisania striata is a species of sea snail, a marine gastropod mollusk in the family Pisaniidae.

== Description ==
The length of the shell attains 22.8 mm.

== Distribution ==
This species occurs in the Gulf of Naples, Italy.
