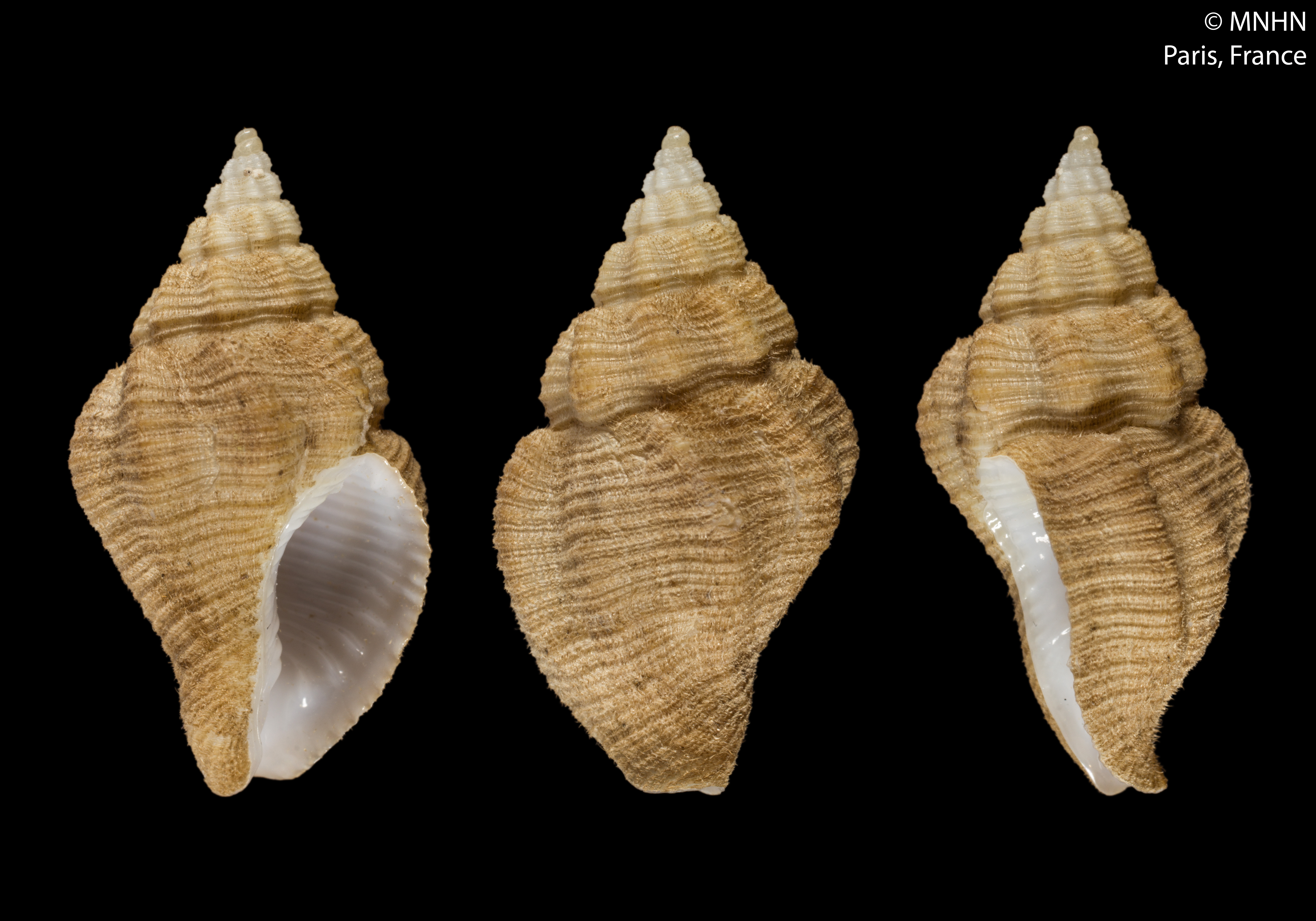
- Shell of Pollia pellita (holotype at MNHN, Paris)

Scientific classification
- Kingdom: Animalia
- Phylum: Mollusca
- Class: Gastropoda
- Subclass: Caenogastropoda
- Order: Neogastropoda
- Family: Pisaniidae
- Genus: Pollia
- Species: P. pellita

Binomial name
- Pollia pellita Vermeij & Bouchet, 1998

= Pollia pellita =

Species of gastropod

Pollia pellita is a species of sea snail, a marine gastropod mollusk in the family Pisaniidae, the true whelks.

== Description ==
The length of the shell attains 26.7 mm.

== Distribution ==
This marine species occurs off New Caledonia.
