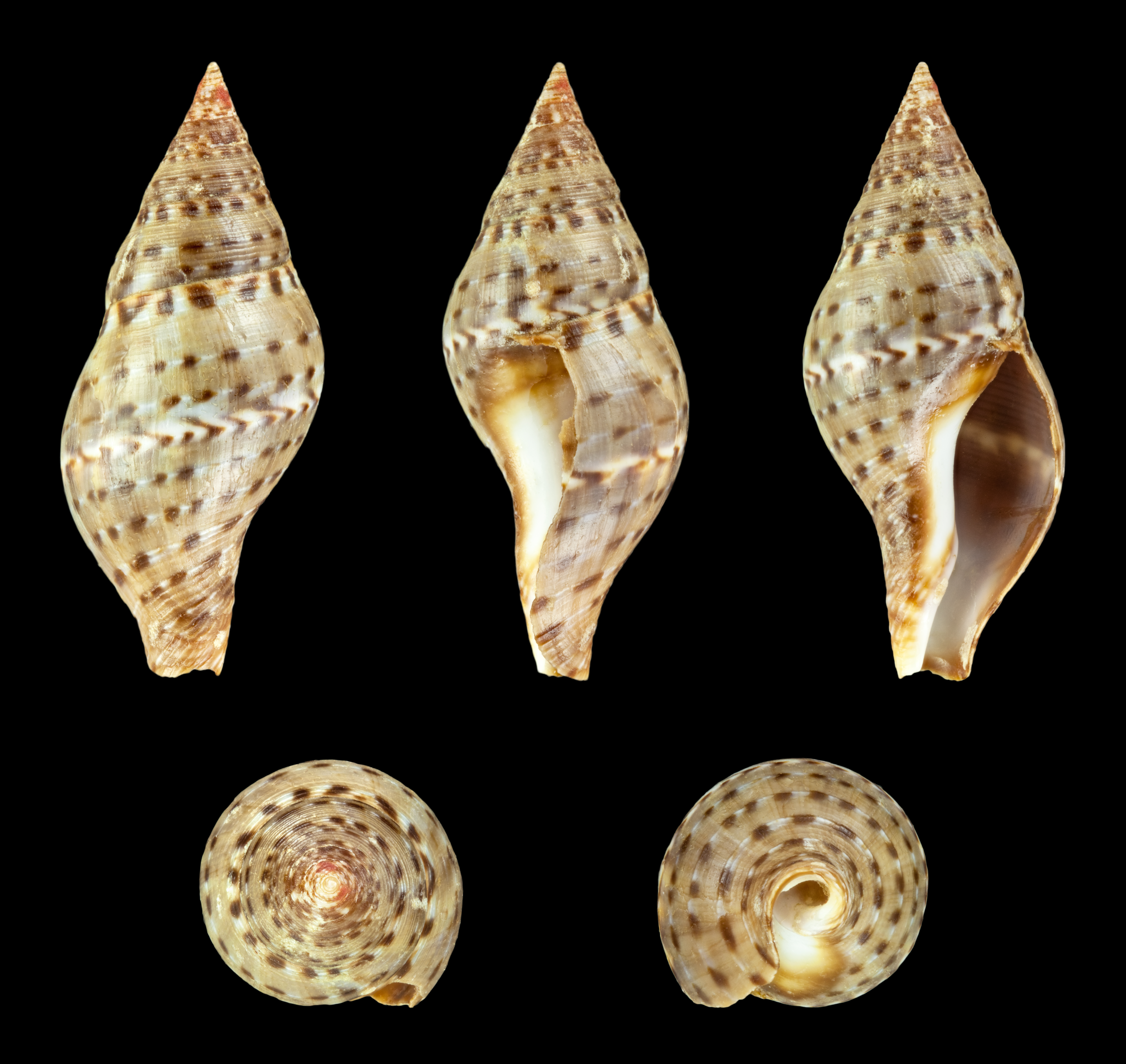
- Five views of a shell of Pisania pusio

Scientific classification
- Kingdom: Animalia
- Phylum: Mollusca
- Class: Gastropoda
- Subclass: Caenogastropoda
- Order: Neogastropoda
- Family: Pisaniidae
- Genus: Pisania
- Species: P. pusio

Binomial name
- Pisania pusio (Linnaeus, 1758)

Synonyms
- Buccinum janeirense Philippi, 1849; Fusus articulatus Lamarck, 1822; Pisania janeirensis (Philippi, 1849)

= Pisania pusio =

Species of gastropod

Pisania pusio is a species of sea snail, a marine gastropod mollusk in the family Pisaniidae.

== Description ==
The size of the shell varies between 19 mm and 51 mm. The color of the shell is chocolate or purplish, with revolving series of red-brown arrowheaded markings. The interior of the aperture is bluish . The columella and the edge of the outer lip has a fawn color. There is usually a white central band on the body.

== Distribution ==
This species occurs in the Gulf of Mexico, Cuba, the Caribbean Sea and off the Lesser Antilles; in the Atlantic Ocean off Ascension Island, the Bermudas and Eastern Brazil.
