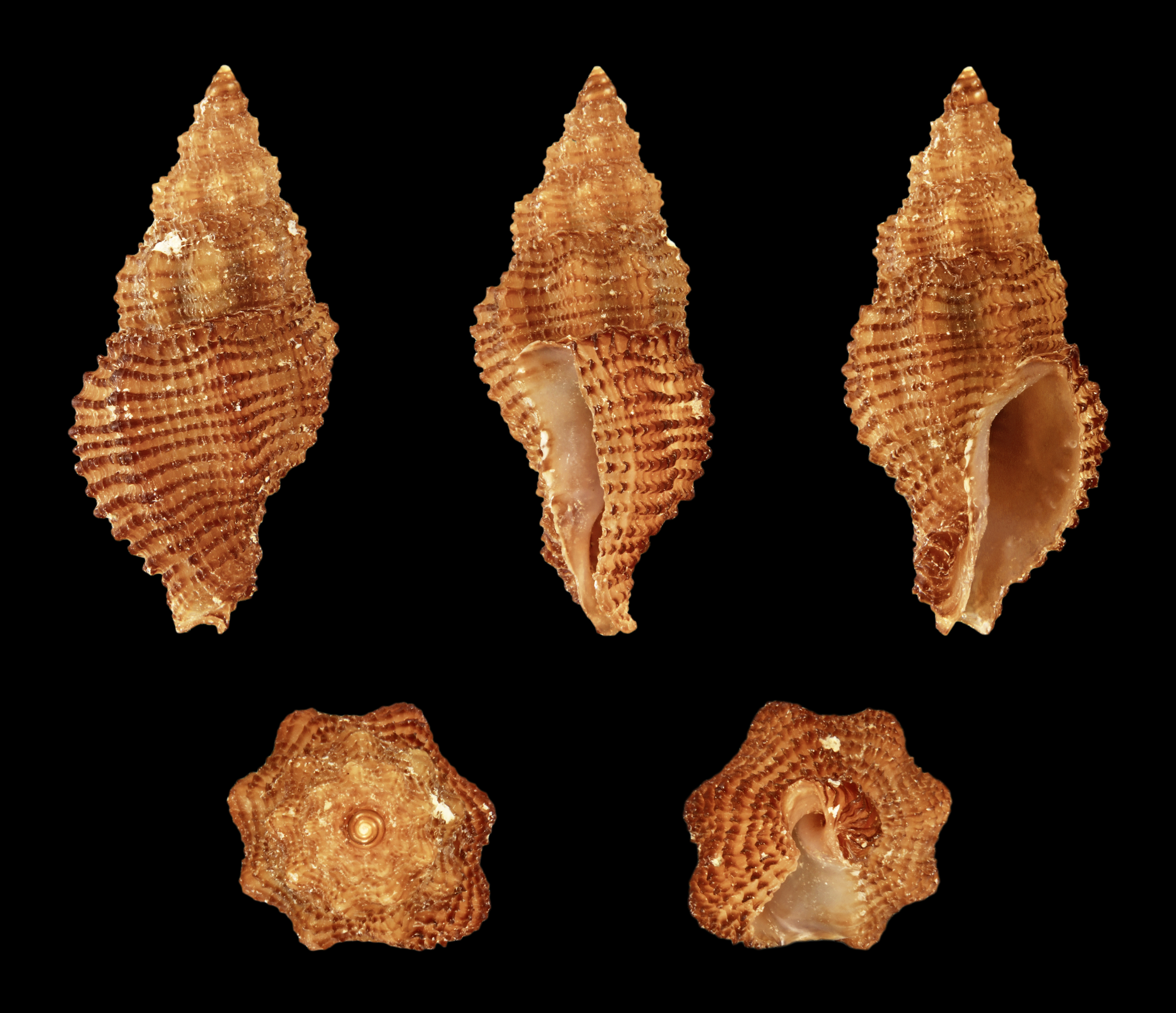
- Shell of Pollia subrubiginosa

Scientific classification
- Kingdom: Animalia
- Phylum: Mollusca
- Class: Gastropoda
- Subclass: Caenogastropoda
- Order: Neogastropoda
- Family: Pisaniidae
- Genus: Pollia
- Species: P. subrubiginosa

Binomial name
- Pollia subrubiginosa (E. A. Smith, 1879)

Synonyms
- Tritonidea subrubiginosa E. A. Smith, 1879 (original combination)

= Pollia subrubiginosa =

Species of gastropod

Pollia subrubiginosa, common name : the smoky goblet, is a species of sea snail, a marine gastropod mollusk in the family Pisaniidae.

== Description ==
The species is small, ranging from 10 to 17 mm in length. Its whorls of the protoconch are smooth and light brown, though the initial whorl is a contrasting white. The remainder of the shell is uniformly dark reddish-brown in colour, accented by a narrow, white central band that encircles the body whorl. The spiral cords are regular, thin, and distinctly elevated, creating interspaces that are broader than the threads themselves; these gaps are further sculptured with fine interstitial spiral lirae and obsolete axial growth striae.

While the early whorls are axially ribbed, the last two whorls become smooth or only obsoletely costate. The aperture is a clean bluish-white, and the labial lip is adorned with 12 elongated denticles that continue as prominent lirae deep into the aperture. Seasoning the columella, the anterior portion is white and bears 1 to 3 small denticles, whereas the centre of the columella transitions to a brownish hue. Additionally, the parietal wall is heavily calloused and features a single small denticle. Structurally, the radula possesses laterals that are equipped with a serrated inner cusp. The entire shell is enveloped in a brown, moderately translucent periostracum.

== Distribution ==
This marine species occurs off Japan and Korea.
