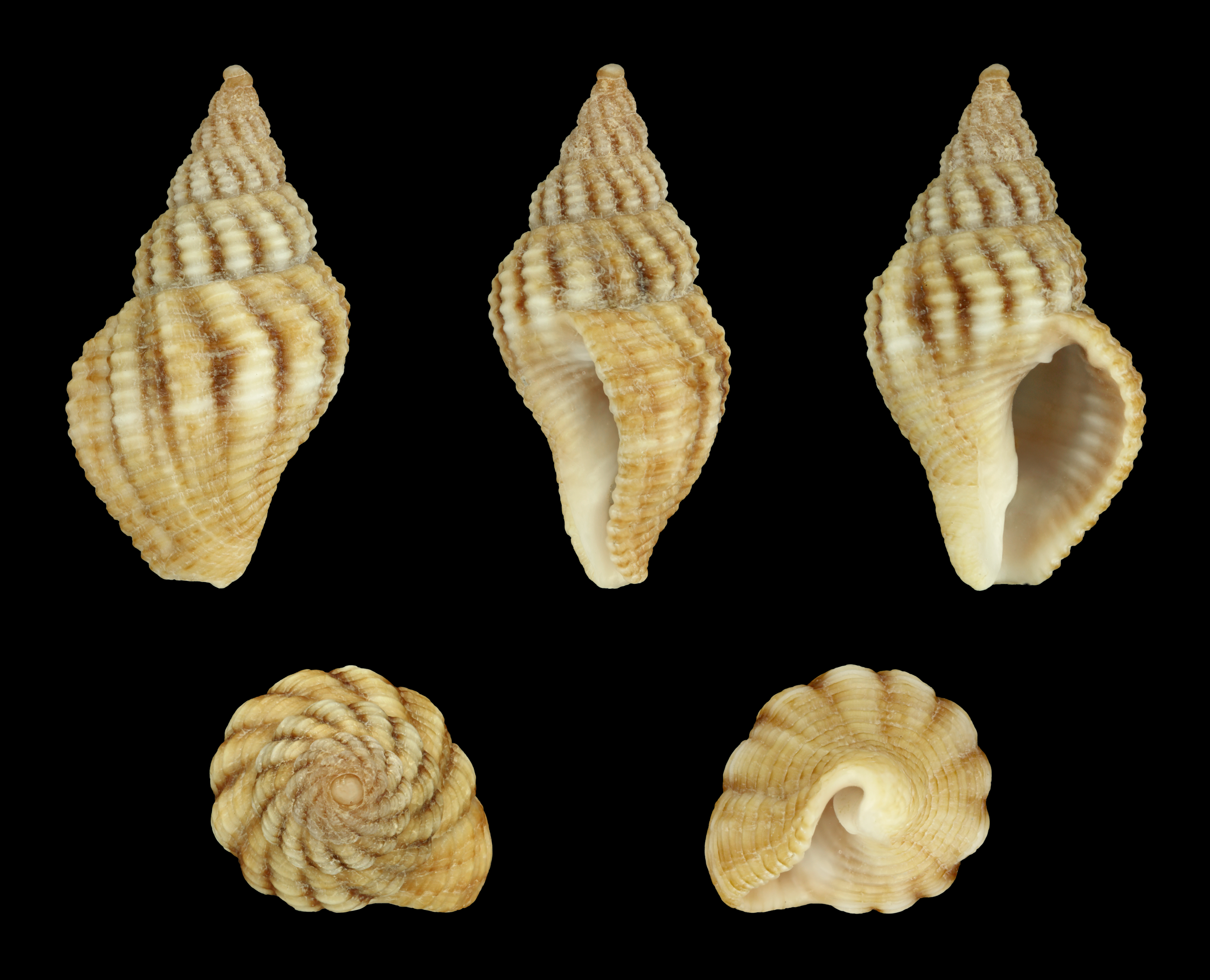
- Aplus assimilis shell

Scientific classification
- Kingdom: Animalia
- Phylum: Mollusca
- Class: Gastropoda
- Subclass: Caenogastropoda
- Order: Neogastropoda
- Superfamily: Buccinoidea
- Family: Pisaniidae
- Genus: Aplus; De Gregorio, 1885

Synonyms
- Murex (Aplus) De Gregorio, 1885 superseded combination

= Aplus =

Genus of gastropods

Aplus is a genus of sea snails, marine gastropod mollusks in the family Pisaniidae.

== Characteristics ==
(Original description in Italian) The shells are bucciniform or mitre-shaped in a somewhat rough appearance. The outer lip is thickened and toothed, the interior corrugated. The whorls are ribbed and corded.

== Distribution ==
Species of this genus occur in the Mediterranean Sea and in the Atlantic Ocean off West Africa.

== Species ==
Species within the genus Aplus include:

- † Aplus abessensis Lozouet, 2021
- † Aplus aequicostatus (Bellardi, 1873)
- † Aplus anatolicus Harzhauser & Landau, 2024
- † Aplus andrei (Basterot, 1825)
- † Aplus aquitanensis (Peyrot, 1927)
- Aplus assimilis (Reeve, 1846)
- † Aplus cancellaroides (Basterot, 1825)
- Aplus coccineus (Monterosato, 1884)
- † Aplus dispar (Millet, 1865) † (accepted > unreplaced junior homonym, junior homonym of Nassa dispar A. Adams, 1852)
- Aplus dorbignyi (Payraudeau, 1826)
- † Aplus exsculptus (Dujardin, 1837)
- Aplus gaillardoti (Puton, 1856)
- † Aplus grandiculus Lozouet, 2021
- † Aplus hofae Harzhauser & Landau, 2024
- † Aplus lapugyensis (R. Hoernes & Auinger, 1890)
- † Aplus littoralis Lozouet, 2021
- † Aplus minusculus (Peyrot, 1928)
- † Aplus minutulus (Bałuk, 1995)
- † Aplus moravicus (R. Hoernes & Auinger, 1890)
- † Aplus nilus (De Gregorio, 1885)
- Aplus nodulosus (Bivona e Bernardi, 1832)
- † Aplus pseudoaquitanensis Lozouet, 2021
- † Aplus pseudoassimilis Brunetti & Della Bella, 2016
- Aplus ranellaeformis (R. Hoernes & Auinger, 1890)
- † Aplus raveni Landau & Harzhauser, 2024
- † Aplus scaber (Millet, 1865)
- Aplus scacchianus (Philippi, 1844)
- † Aplus subpusillus (R. Hoernes & Auinger, 1890)
- † Aplus transsylvanicus (R. Hoernes & Auinger, 1890)
- † Aplus volhynicus (Friedberg, 1912)
- † Aplus wimmeri (R. Hoernes & Auinger, 1880)
- † Aplus zebus (De Gregorio, 1885)

== Synonyms ==
- Aplus campisii (Ardovini, 2015): synonym of Aplus coccineus (Monterosato, 1884)
- † Aplus mariae (R. Hoernes & Auinger, 1890): synonym of † Tethyspollia mariae (R. Hoernes & Auinger, 1890) (superseded combination)
- Aplus scaber (Locard, 1891): synonym of Aplus coccineus (Monterosato, 1884) (junior subjective synonym)
- † Aplus varians (Michelotti, 1847): synonym of † Monostiolum varians (Michelotti, 1847)
