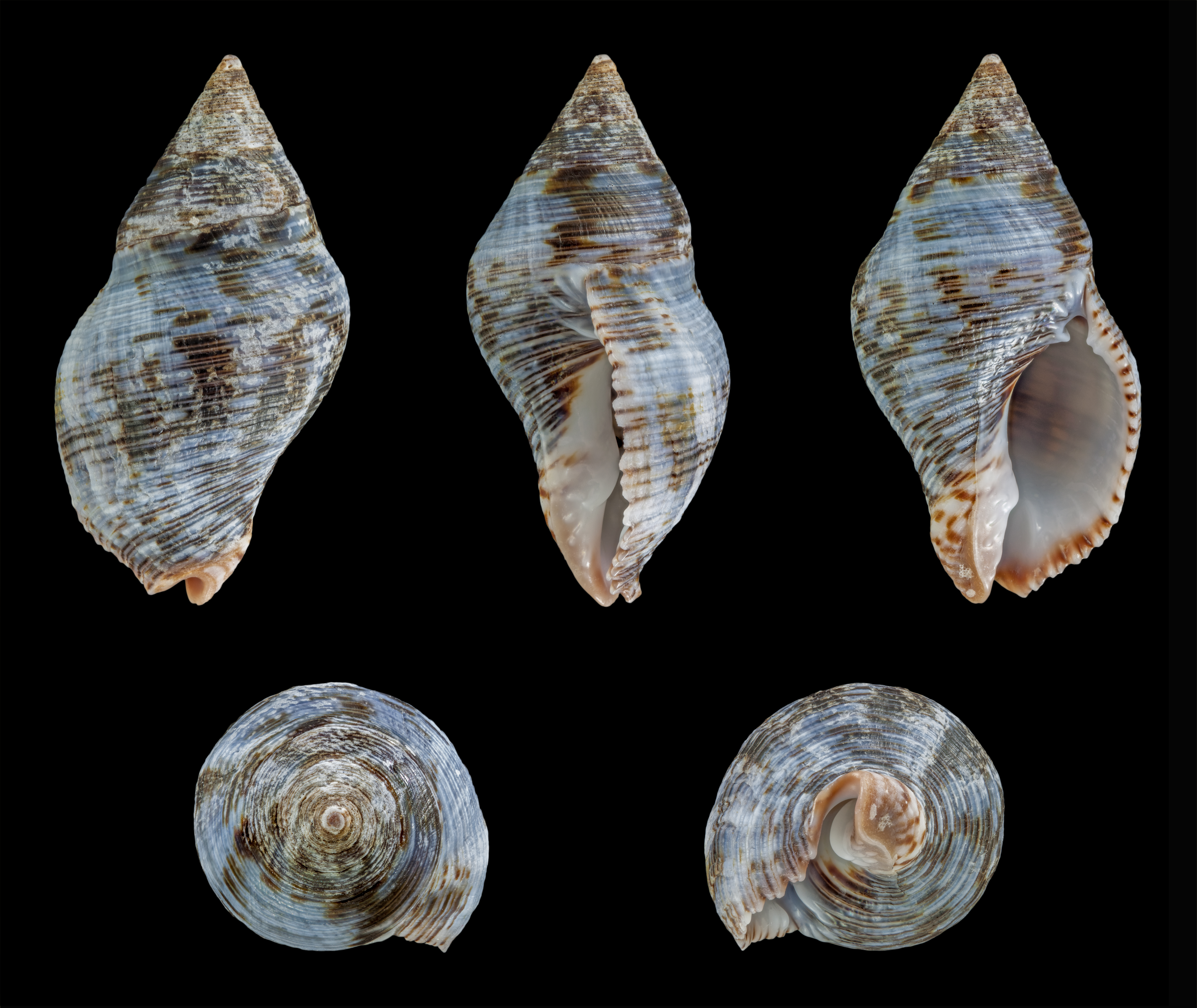
- Five views of a shell of Gemophos viverratus

Scientific classification
- Kingdom: Animalia
- Phylum: Mollusca
- Class: Gastropoda
- Subclass: Caenogastropoda
- Order: Neogastropoda
- Family: Pisaniidae
- Genus: Gemophos
- Species: G. viverratus

Binomial name
- Gemophos viverratus (Kiener, 1834)

Synonyms
- Buccinum viverratum Kiener, 1834 (original combination); Cantharus proteus Scacchi, A., 1836; Cantharus variegata Tryon, G.W., 1881; Cantharus viverratus (Kiener, 1834); Pisania viveratoides Orbigny, A.V.M.D. d', 1844

= Gemophos viverratus =

Species of gastropod

Gemophos viverratus is a species of sea snail, a marine gastropod mollusk in the family Pisaniidae.

== Description ==
The length of the shell varies between 30 mm and 50 mm.

(Original description) The ovate shell is elongated and spindle-shaped. It is of an olive color. The pointed spire is formed of six or seven slightly convex whorls, the lowest larger than all the others together, slightly angular, and flattish above. The edge of the angle in young specimens, is more prominent, and bordered by a row of pretty apparent tubercles, which disappear with age. The sutures are slightly perceptible. The first three upper whorls are covered with very approximate small longitudinal folds. The others are ornamented externally merely, with numerous, regular transverse striae, between which are distinguished other very delicate ones. These striae are interrupted by elongated white or reddish spots, often presenting grayish flammules upon the upper whorls. The ovate aperture is elongated, attenuated at its two extremities. Its interior is bluish. The whitish columella is smooth, almost straight, and a little twisted at its base. The outer lip is straight, thin, sharp, lightly striated at its inner edge with brown lines.

== Distribution ==
This species occurs in the Atlantic Ocean from Mauritania to Angola; off the Cape Verdes and the Canary Islands. It was originally described from the Mediterranean Sea off Alexandria.
