= Pisania hermannseni =

Scientific classification
- Kingdom: Animalia
- Phylum: Mollusca
- Class: Gastropoda
- Subclass: Caenogastropoda
- Order: Neogastropoda
- Family: Pisaniidae
- Genus: Pisania
- Species: P. hermannseni

Binomial name
- Pisania hermannseni A. Adams, 1855

Species of gastropod

Pisania hermannseni is a species of sea snail, a marine gastropod mollusc in the family Pisaniidae, first described in 1846 by Lovell Augustus Reeve as Buccinum fasciculatum.

== Description ==
(Original description in Latin) The shell is oblong and spindle-shaped, possessing a smooth, yellowish-brown surface that is obscurely dotted with white specks. It consists of seven somewhat swollen whorls. The body whorl is transversely grooved toward the front. The aperture is squarely oval in shape. At the back, the columella is equipped with a calloused layer, while the outer lip is expanded, dilated toward the front, and ridged on the inside.

This is a mitriform species, of a fulvous colour, with the outer lip rather expanded, and sulcated interiorly.

== Distribution ==
This species occurs off China.
