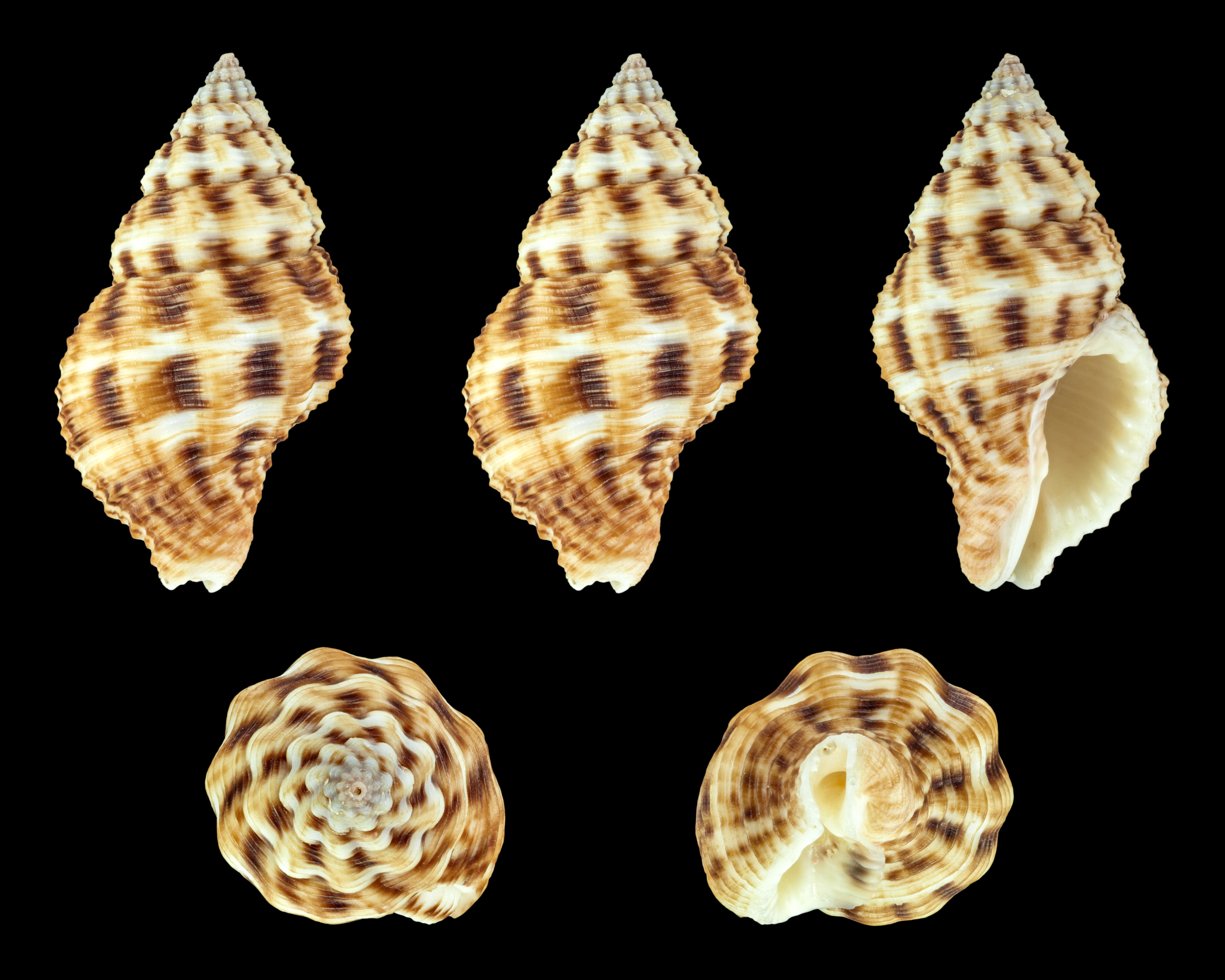

Scientific classification
- Kingdom: Animalia
- Phylum: Mollusca
- Class: Gastropoda
- Subclass: Caenogastropoda
- Order: Neogastropoda
- Family: Pisaniidae
- Genus: Pollia
- Species: P. wagneri

Binomial name
- Pollia wagneri (Anton, 1839)

Synonyms
- Clivipollia wagneri (Anton, 1838) superseded combination; Peristernia wagneri (Anton, 1838) superseded combination; Turbinella tigrina Hombron & Jacquinot, 1848; Turbinella wagneri Anton, 1838 (original combination); Turbinella wagneri var. samoensis Kobelt, 1876 (junior synonym)

= Pollia wagneri =

Species of gastropod

Pollia wagneri, commonly known as Wagner's Goblet, is a species of sea snail, a marine gastropod mollusk in the family Pisaniidae, the goblet snails. It is a benthic predator, living on the seafloor, under/on rocks, where it preys on smaller invertebrates.

== Description ==
The length of the shell is approximately 18 to 35 mm.

(Original description in German) This species is acutely oval in shape and far shorter than Turbinella craticulata, lacking any turriculated form. Furthermore, it possesses two fewer whorls, while displaying only a faint trace of an umbilicus.

The inner margin of the lip is strongly thickened and marked by finely denticulated furrows. The columella is straight rather than inflected, featuring a very distinct and transversely grooved columellar callus. Additionally, the anterior siphonal canal is shorter, and the coloration is characterized by brownish interstitial furrows that contrast against whitish ribs.

The shell of this species ranges from a creamy-white to a yellowish colour, which is beautifully contrasted by its orange-brown spiral cords. Upon the body whorl, there are three distinct spiral rows of purple spots that are neatly situated within the interstices of the axial ribs. The operculum is yellowish-brown and features a basal nucleus, while the surrounding periostracum is characteristically brown and opaque.

== Distribution ==
This marine species is found in the Pacific Ocean off the coast of Indonesia and the Philippines and in the Red Sea. It could also be in/around the Mascarene Basin.
