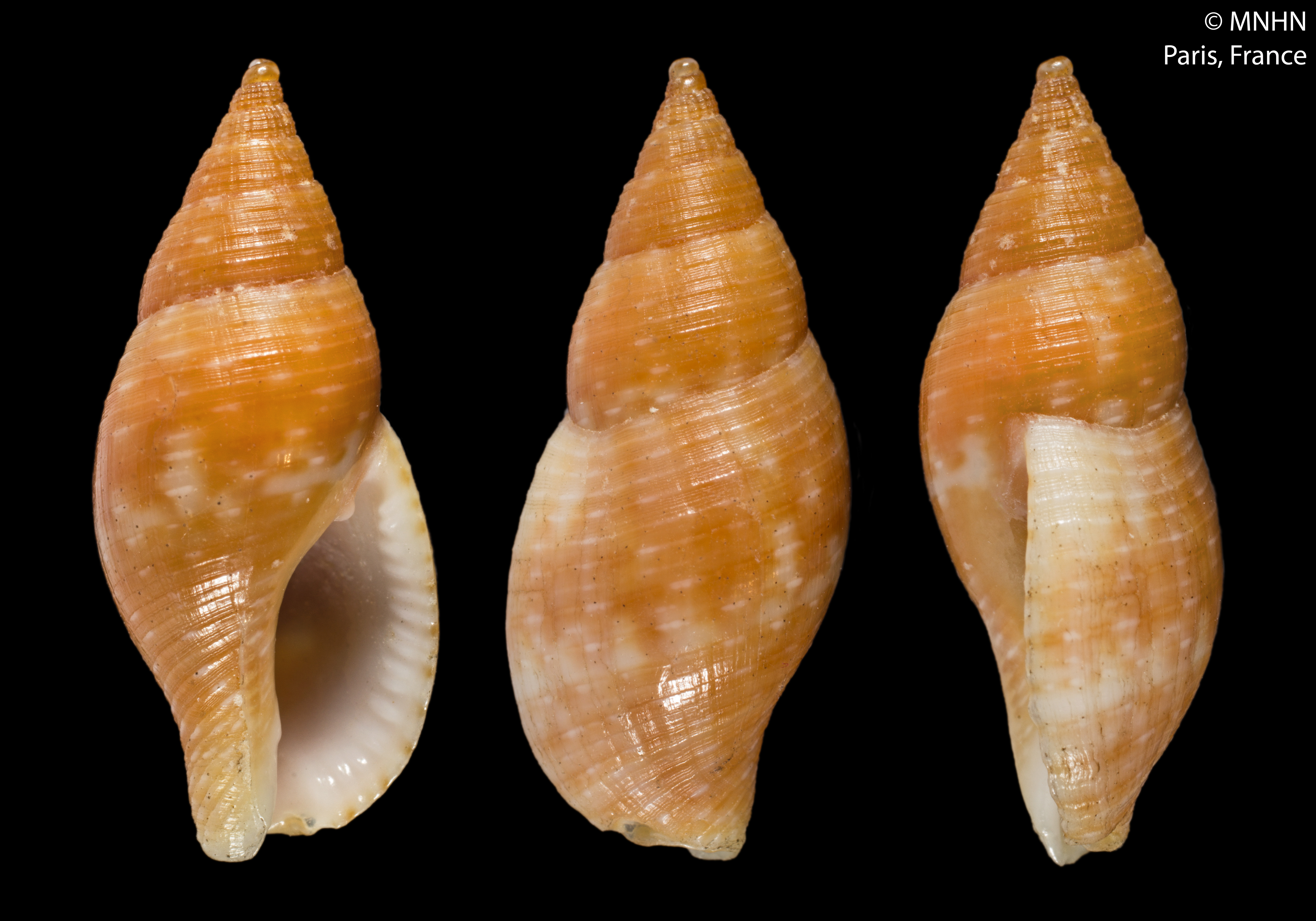
- Shell of Pisania fasciculata (syntype at MNHN, Paris)

Scientific classification
- Kingdom: Animalia
- Phylum: Mollusca
- Class: Gastropoda
- Subclass: Caenogastropoda
- Order: Neogastropoda
- Family: Pisaniidae
- Genus: Pisania
- Species: P. fasciculata

Binomial name
- Pisania fasciculata (Reeve, 1846)

Synonyms
- Buccinum fasciculatum Reeve, 1846 (original combination); Pisania crenilabrum A. Adams, 1855; Pisania montrouzieri Crosse, 1862; Triton (Pusio) vexillum Gray in Griffith & Pidgeon, 1833 (senior synonym)

= Pisania fasciculata =

Species of gastropod

Pisania fasciculata is a species of sea snail, a marine gastropod mollusc in the family Pisaniidae, first described in 1846 by Lovell Augustus Reeve as Buccinum fasciculatum.

== Description ==
The length of the shell of the lectotype attains 28.4 mm its diameter 10.4 mm.

(Original description) in Latin of Pisania crenilabrum) The shell is fusiform (spindle-shaped) with a prominently protruding spire. It is brown in color, adorned with a broad band that is obscurely jointed with chestnut-brown markings. There are seven whorls in total; the uppermost whorls are folded lengthwise, while the final, largest whorl is transversely ridged. The aperture is oval and relatively short. The inner lip is covered by a glossy callus, while the outer lip is somewhat thickened on the outside, featuring a finely notched margin.

The species is variable in colour, being either brown, reddish-brown, grey or purplish, and is occasionally ornamented with axial streaks and small white spots on the spiral striae; in some specimens the dark axial zones and white spots are absent.

== Distribution ==
This species occurs in the Indian Ocean off the Mascarene Basin; also off New Caledonia.
