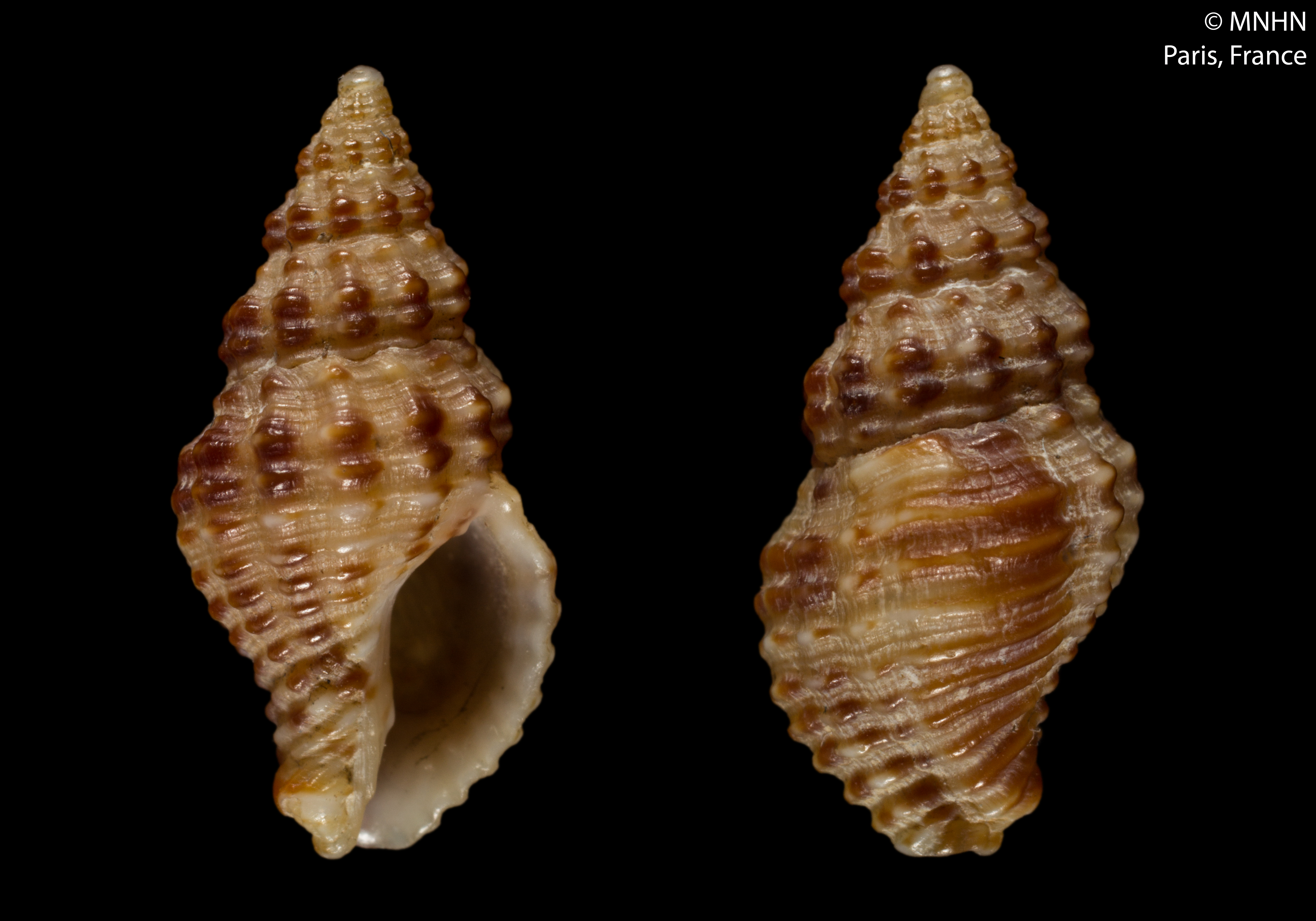
- Shell of Aplus scaber (syntype at MNHN, Paris)

Scientific classification
- Kingdom: Animalia
- Phylum: Mollusca
- Class: Gastropoda
- Subclass: Caenogastropoda
- Order: Neogastropoda
- Family: Pisaniidae
- Genus: Aplus
- Species: †A. scaber

Binomial name
- †Aplus scaber (Millet, 1865)

Synonyms
- Anna scabra (Locard, 1892); Cantharus scaber (Locard, 1892); Cantharus scaber unicolor Nordsieck, 1972 (dubious synonym); † Fusus scaber Millet, 1865 superseded combination; Mitrella marminea Risso, 1826 (dubious synonym); Pollia scabra Locard, 1891 (original combination)

= Aplus scaber =

Species of gastropod

Aplus scaber is an extinct species of sea snail, a marine gastropod mollusk in the family Pisaniidae.

== Description ==
The length of the shell veries between 10 m- 11mm, its diameter between 4 mm-5 mm.

(Original description in French) The small shell is somewhat elongated and swollen below. It is composed of six to seven whorls adorned with narrow, prominent ribs that extend to the suture. These ribs are covered with close-set, rough striae, except on the upper part of each whorl, which is smooth. The aperture is almost oval, with a very short siphonal canal, and a few slight folds can be observed on the inner part of the outer lip, which shows a strong external ridge.

== Distribution ==
Fossils of this species were found in Lower Pliocene strata in Loire-Atlantique, France.
