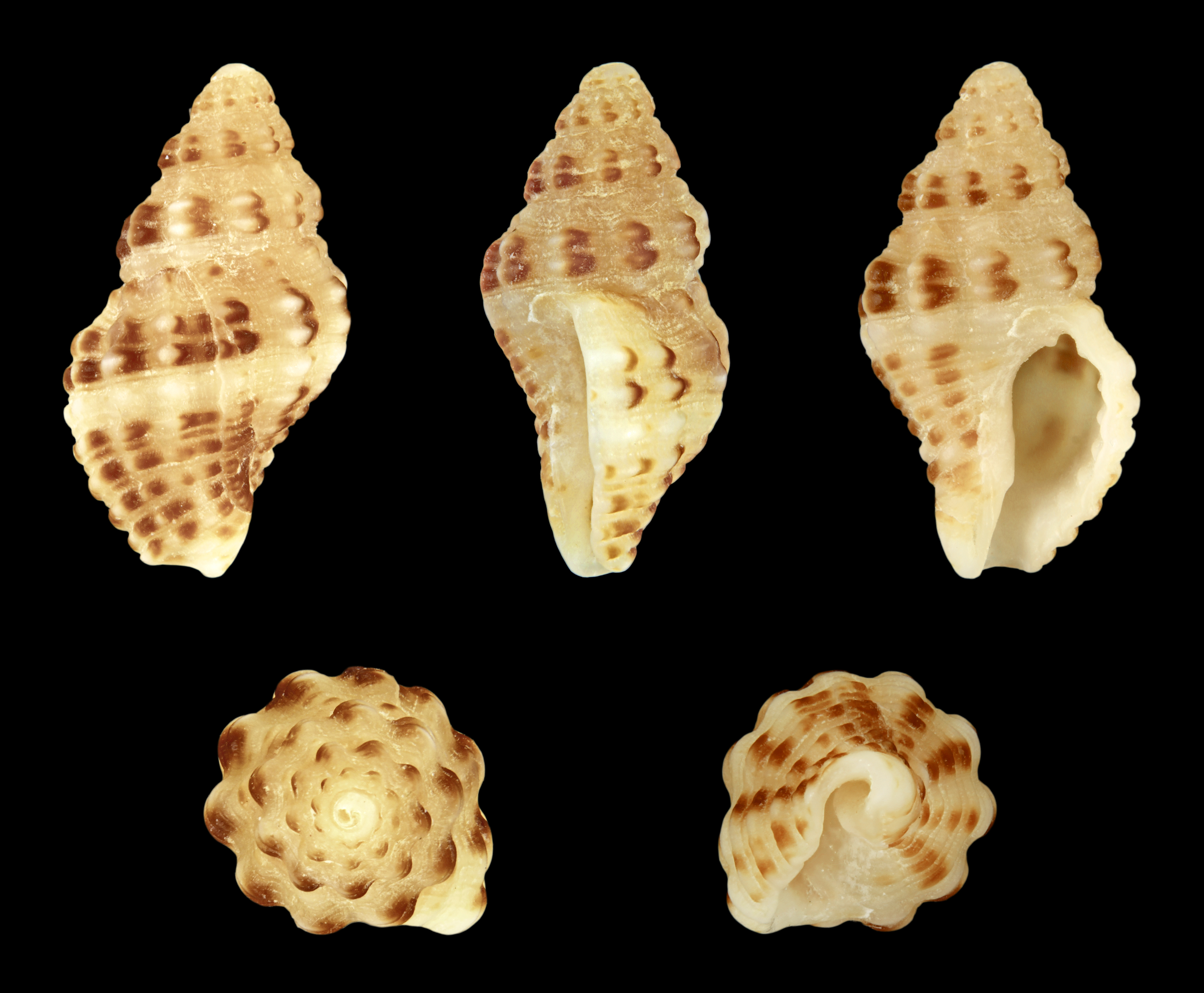

Scientific classification
- Kingdom: Animalia
- Phylum: Mollusca
- Class: Gastropoda
- Subclass: Caenogastropoda
- Order: Neogastropoda
- Family: Pisaniidae
- Genus: Aplus
- Species: A. scacchianus

Binomial name
- Aplus scacchianus (Philippi, 1844)

Synonyms
- Buccinum scacchianum Philippi, 1844 (original combination); Cantharus scacchianus (R. A. Philippi, 1844) superseded combination; Pisania picta (Scacchi, 1836) superseded combination (and junior homonym); Pollia scacchiana (Philippi, 1844); Purpura picta Scacchi, 1836 (invalid: junior homonym of Purpura picta Turton, 1825; Buccinum scacchianum is a replacement name)

= Aplus scacchianus =

Species of gastropod

Aplus scacchianus is a species of sea snail, a marine gastropod mollusk in the family Pisaniidae.

== Description ==
(Original description in Latin) The small shell is dull whitish and transversely ornamented with interrupted brown lines. The middle of the body whorl is paler. The surface is transversely striate and rugose, with slight longitudinal folds. The columella bears a single fold above and fine denticles below. The outer lip is thickened (varicose) and finely striated within.

== Distribution ==
This species occurs in the Mediterranean Sea off Naples (Italy), Sicily and the Greek coast.
