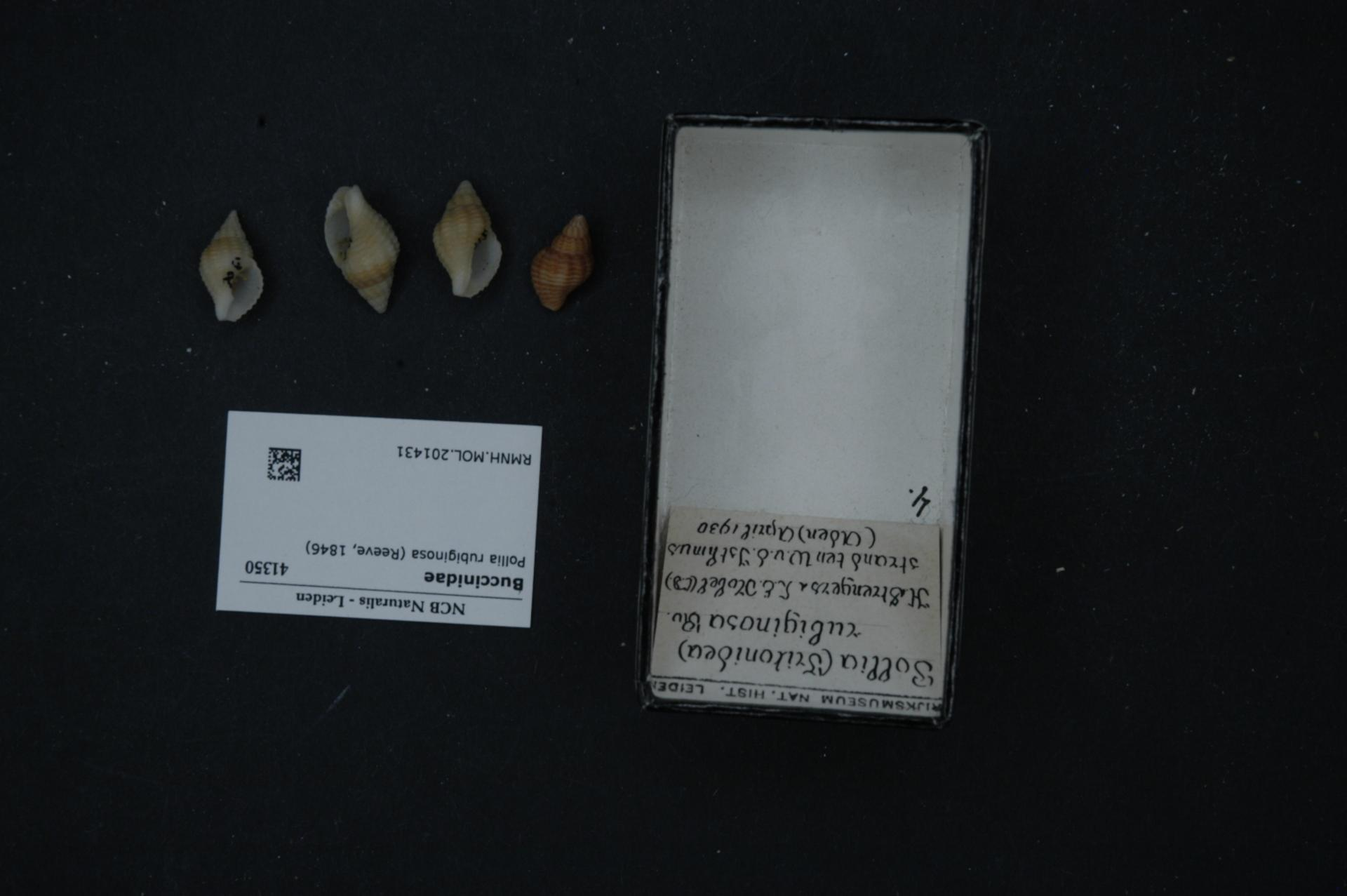

Scientific classification
- Kingdom: Animalia
- Phylum: Mollusca
- Class: Gastropoda
- Subclass: Caenogastropoda
- Order: Neogastropoda
- Family: Pisaniidae
- Genus: Pollia
- Species: P. rubiginosa

Binomial name
- Pollia rubiginosa (Reeve, 1846)

Synonyms
- Buccinum rubiginosum Reeve, 1846; Cantharus rubiginosus (Reeve, 1846); Pisania rubiginosa Reeve

= Pollia rubiginosa =

Species of gastropod

Pollia rubiginosa is a species of sea snail, a marine gastropod mollusc in the family Pisaniidae.

== Description ==
The shell size varies between 20 mm and 30 mm

== Distribution ==
This species occurs in the Red Sea, in the Indian Ocean off Tanzania, Mozambique and Réunion and in the Pacific Ocean off the Philippines.
