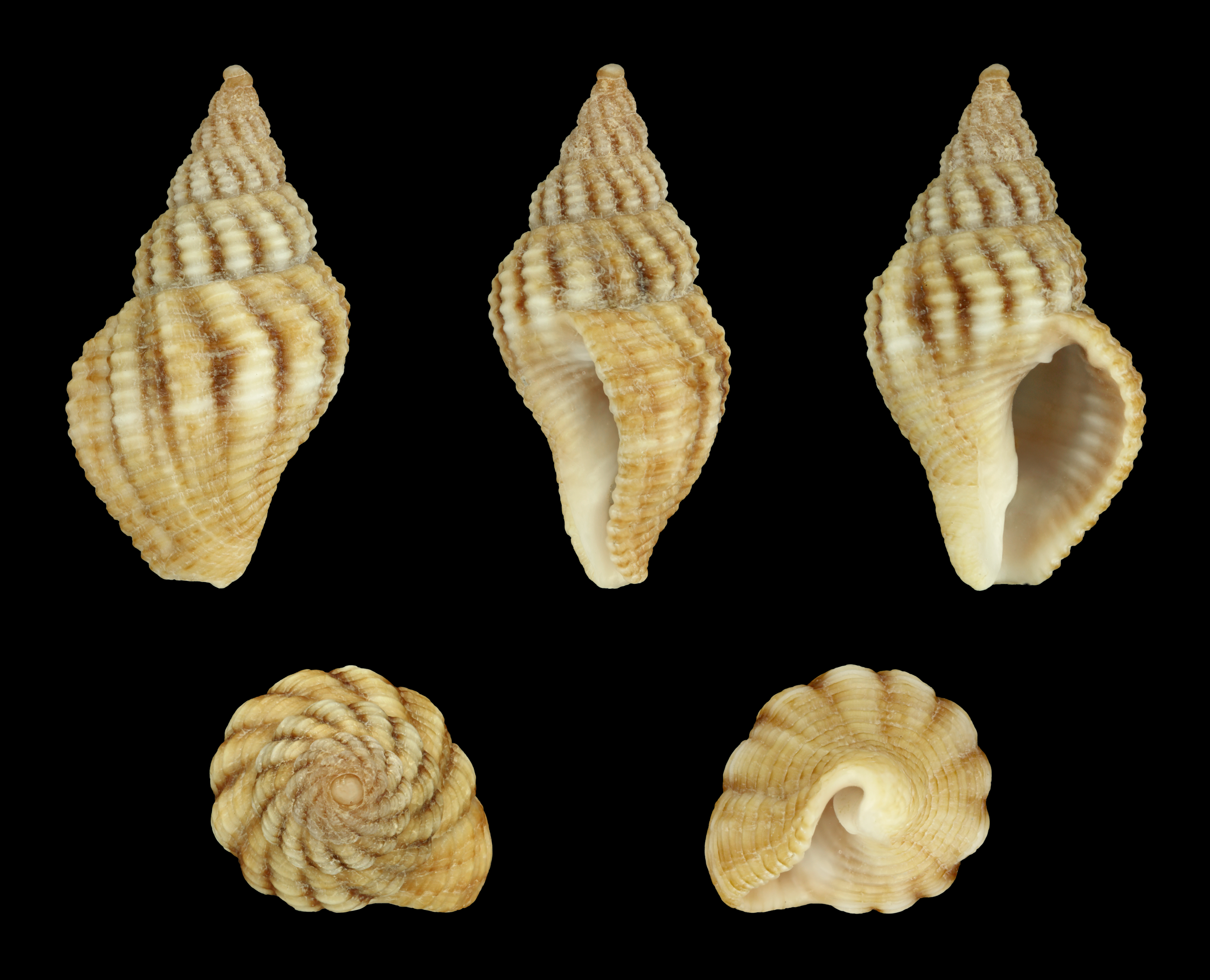

Scientific classification
- Kingdom: Animalia
- Phylum: Mollusca
- Class: Gastropoda
- Subclass: Caenogastropoda
- Order: Neogastropoda
- Family: Pisaniidae
- Genus: Aplus
- Species: A. assimilis

Binomial name
- Aplus assimilis (Reeve, 1846)

Synonyms
- Anna assimilis (Reeve, 1846); Buccinum assimile Reeve, 1846; Cantharus assimilis (Reeve, 1846)

= Aplus assimilis =

Species of gastropod

Aplus assimilis, common name the similar buccinum, is a species of sea snail, a marine gastropod mollusc in the family Pisaniidae.

== Description ==
The length of the shell attains 17 mm.

(Original description) The shell is small and oval, finely ridged across, with faint longitudinal, concentric ribbing. Its surface is yellowish, beautifully mottled with shades of purple-brown.

== Distribution ==
This marine species occurs in the Atlantic Ocean off the Canary Islands, Senegal, Mauritania and Western Sahara.
