= Gemophos viverratoides =

Scientific classification
- Kingdom: Animalia
- Phylum: Mollusca
- Class: Gastropoda
- Subclass: Caenogastropoda
- Order: Neogastropoda
- Family: Pisaniidae
- Genus: Gemophos
- Species: G. viverratoides

Binomial name
- Gemophos viverratoides (d'Orbigny, 1840)

Synonyms
- Pollia viverratoides (d'Orbigny, 1840); Purpura viverratoides d'Orbigny, 1840 (original combination)

Species of gastropod

Gemophos viverratoides is a species of sea snail, a marine gastropod mollusk in the family Pisaniidae.

== Distribution ==
This species is distributed in European waters.
