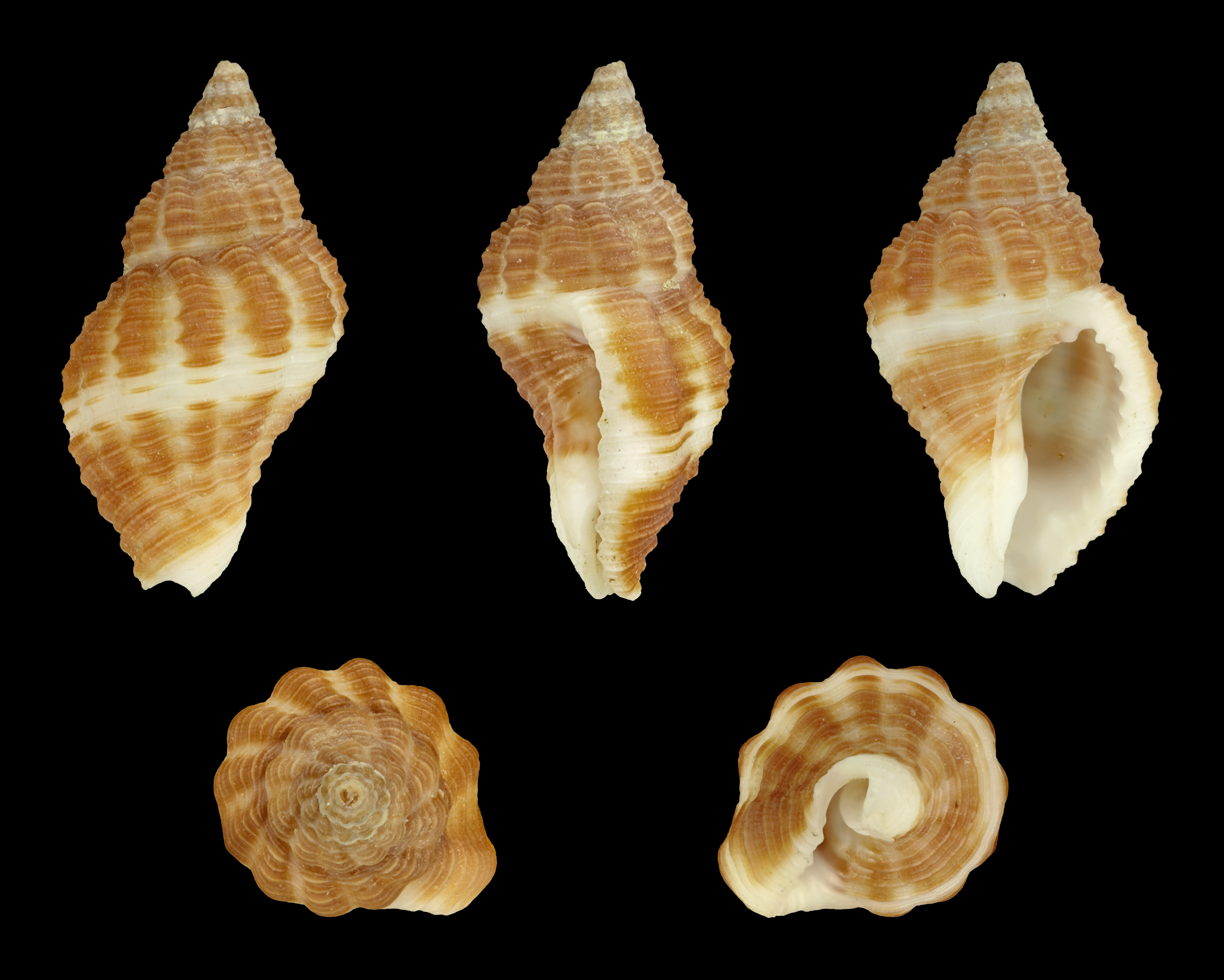

Scientific classification
- Kingdom: Animalia
- Phylum: Mollusca
- Class: Gastropoda
- Subclass: Caenogastropoda
- Order: Neogastropoda
- Family: Pisaniidae
- Genus: Pollia
- Species: P. fumosa

Binomial name
- Pollia fumosa (Dillwyn, 1817)

Synonyms
- Buccinum fumosum Dillwyn, 1817; Cantharus fumosus (Dillwyn, 1817); Tritonidea fumosa (Dillwyn, 1817)

= Pollia fumosa =

Species of gastropod

Pollia fumosa, common name : the smoky goblet, is a species of sea snail, a marine gastropod mollusk in the family Pisaniidae.

== Description ==
The shell size varies between 20 mm and 40 mm.

== Distribution ==
This species is distributed in the Red Sea, the Indian Ocean along Chagos, Madagascar, the Mascarene Basin and Tanzania and the Western Pacific Ocean, and off Queensland, Australia.
