= Gemophos ringens =

Scientific classification
- Kingdom: Animalia
- Phylum: Mollusca
- Class: Gastropoda
- Subclass: Caenogastropoda
- Order: Neogastropoda
- Family: Pisaniidae
- Genus: Gemophos
- Species: G. ringens

Binomial name
- Gemophos ringens (Reeve, 1846)

Species of gastropod

Gemophos ringens, the ringed cantharus, is a species of sea snail in the family Pisaniidae.
