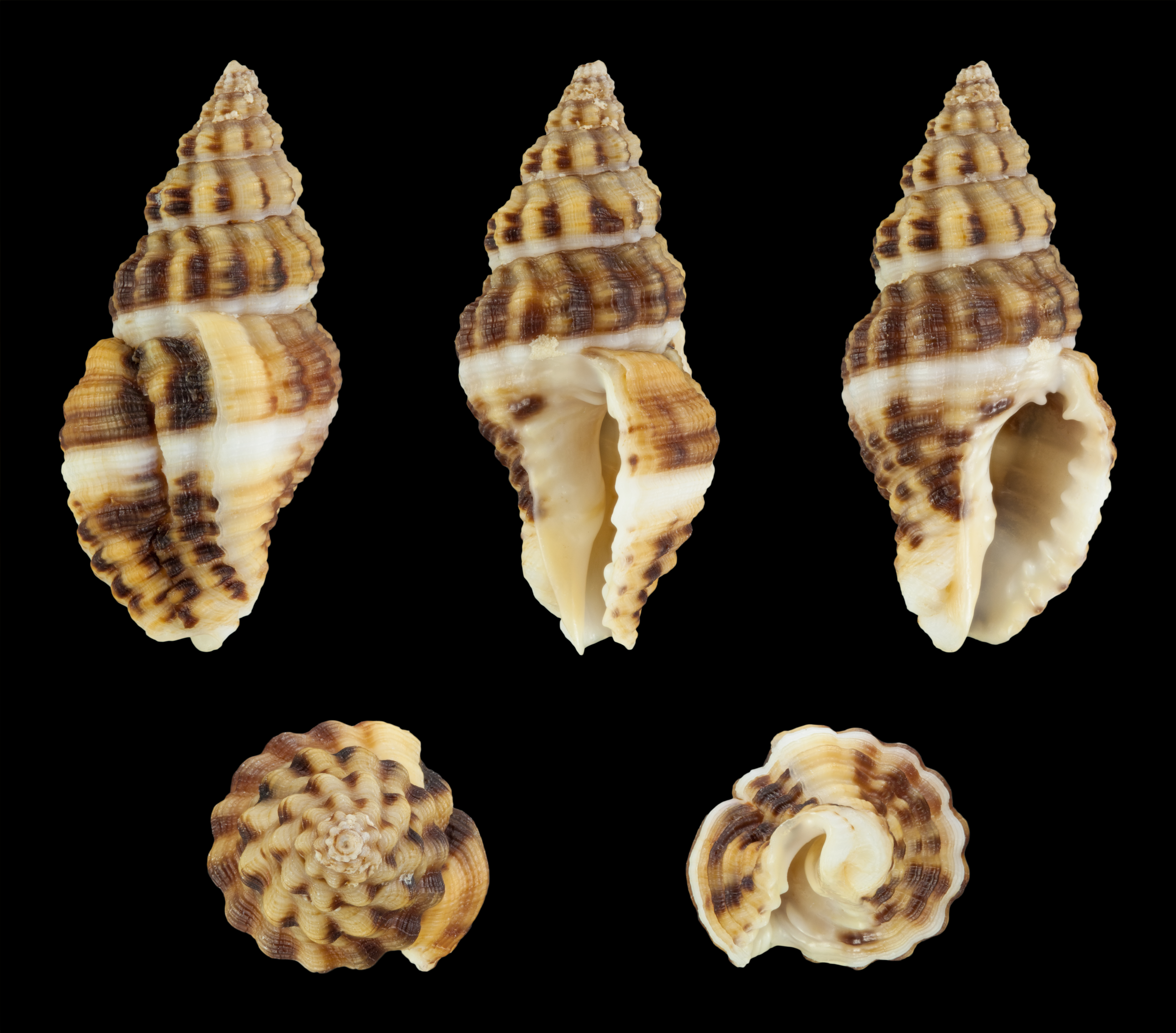
- Shell of Aplus dorbignyi from Malta

Scientific classification
- Kingdom: Animalia
- Phylum: Mollusca
- Class: Gastropoda
- Subclass: Caenogastropoda
- Order: Neogastropoda
- Family: Pisaniidae
- Genus: Aplus
- Species: A. dorbignyi

Binomial name
- Aplus dorbignyi (Payraudeau, 1826)

Synonyms
- Anna dorbignyi (Payraudeau, 1826); Buccinum dorbignyi Payraudeau, 1826 (original description); Buccinum gaillardoti Puton, 1856; Cantharus dorbignyi (Payraudeau 1826); Mitrella marminea Risso, 1826 (dubious synonym); Murex dorbignyi (Payraudeau, 1826); Murex dorbignyi var. afema de Gregorio, 1885; Murex dorbignyi var. carisa de Gregorio, 1885; Pisania dorbignyi (Payraudeau, 1826); Pisania nodulosa Bivona Ant., 1832; Pollia armata Coen, 1933; Pollia coccinea Monterosato, 1884 (dubious synonym); Pollia dorbignyi (Payraudeau, 1826); Pollia lapugyensis Hoernes & Auinger, 1884 (dubious synonym); Pollia moravica Hoernes & Auinger, 1884 (dubious synonym); Pollia multicostata Hoernes & Auinger, 1884 (dubious synonym); Pollia philippi Hoernes & Auinger, 1884 (dubious synonym); Turbinella craticulata Costa O.G., 1829; Turbinella eburnea O. G. Costa, 1830

= Aplus dorbignyi =

Species of gastropod

Aplus dorbignyi is a species of sea snail, a marine gastropod mollusk in the family Pisaniidae.

== Description ==
The shell size varies between 10 mm and 20 mm. This shell is quite variable in pattern and shape. Usually it is quite elongated, with strong axial ribs. It shows a brown or yellowish background with paler nodules and one or two suprasutural white bands along the spirals. The interior is white.

The ovate, subfusiform shell is pointed at its summit. It is composed of eight very distinct whorls, a little swollen, ridged lengthwise by several subnodulous folds, covered also by transverse striae and ridges. The aperture is ovate, violet, edged with reddish, and narrowed at its base. The outer lip is deeply furrowed within. The columella is nearly straight, subgranular; rarely having a distinct fold at the base. The general color is brown, varied with fawn color, with a white zone at the base of each whorl, a broader decurrent band towards the middle of the body whorl.

== Distribution ==
This species occurs in European waters, the Mediterranean Sea, the Red Sea and in the Atlantic Ocean off Mauritania. It lives under rocks at low tide,
