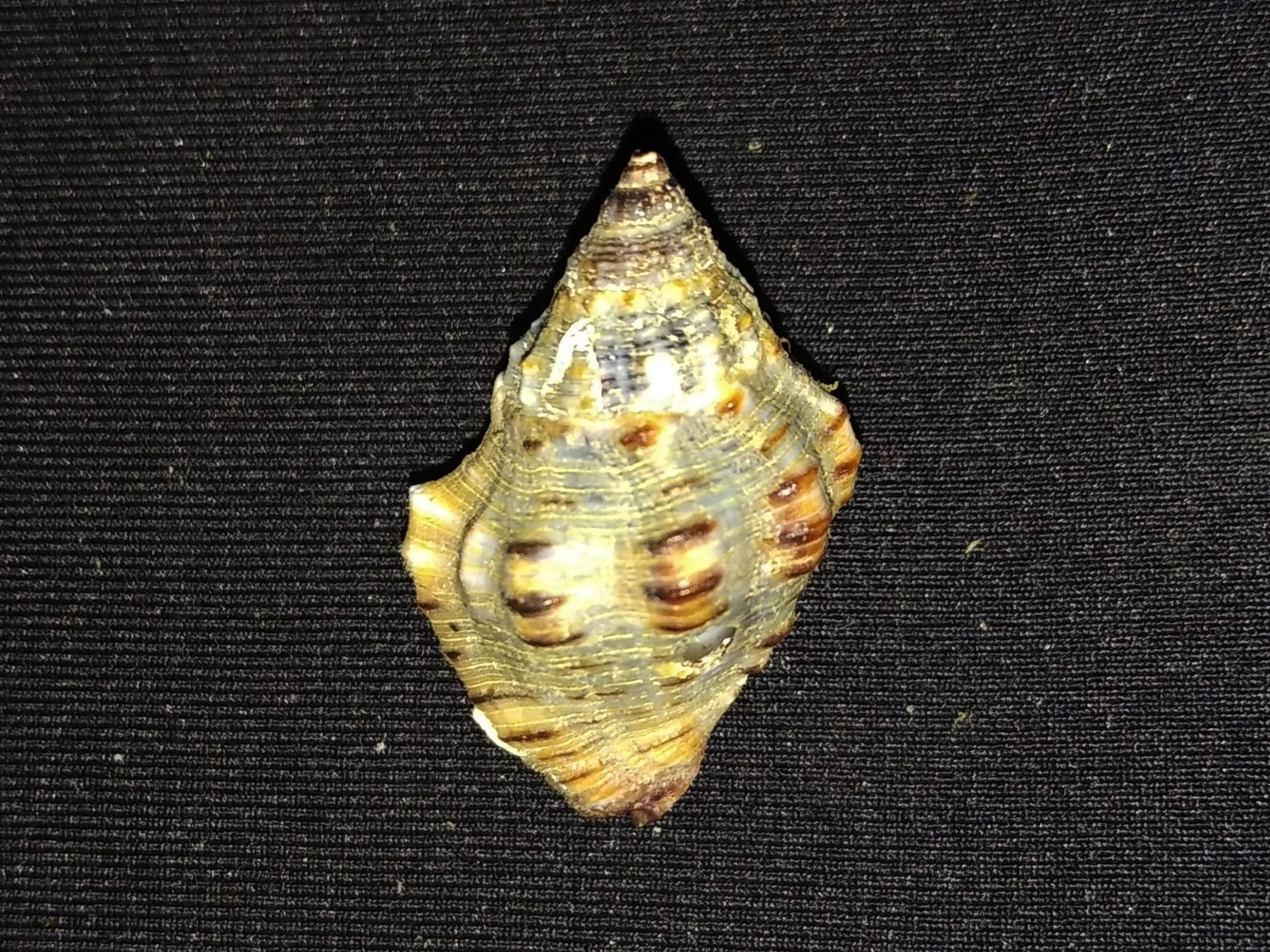

Scientific classification
- Kingdom: Animalia
- Phylum: Mollusca
- Class: Gastropoda
- Subclass: Caenogastropoda
- Order: Neogastropoda
- Family: Pisaniidae
- Genus: Gemophos
- Species: G. sanguinolentus

Binomial name
- Gemophos sanguinolentus (Duclos, 1833)

= Gemophos sanguinolentus =

Species of gastropod

Gemophos sanguinolentus, commonly known as the measle-mouth cantharus, is a species of sea snail in the family Pisaniidae.
