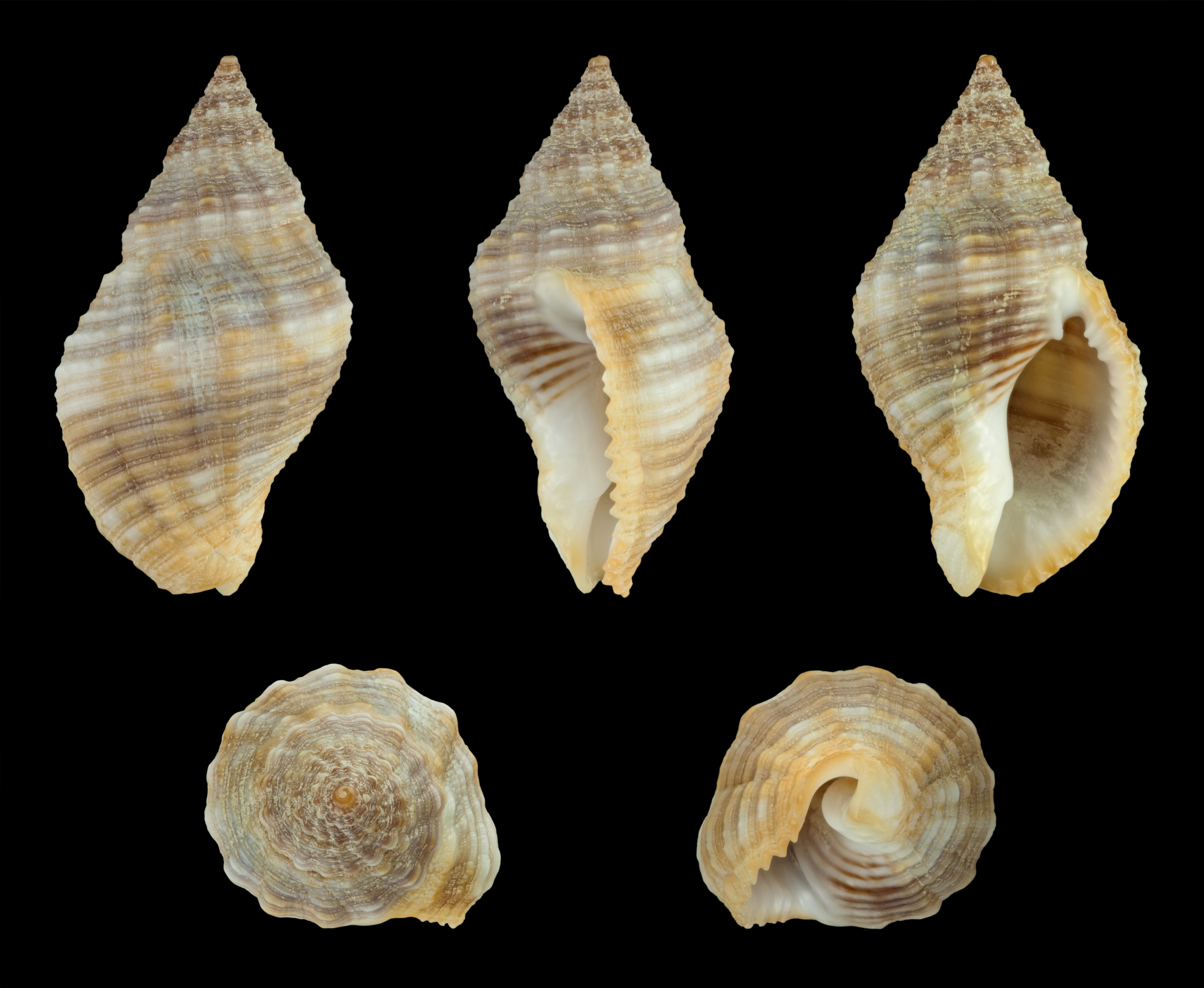

Scientific classification
- Kingdom: Animalia
- Phylum: Mollusca
- Class: Gastropoda
- Subclass: Caenogastropoda
- Order: Neogastropoda
- Family: Pisaniidae
- Genus: Gemophos
- Species: G. tinctus

Binomial name
- Gemophos tinctus (Conrad, 1846)

Synonyms
- Cantharus tinctus (Conrad, 1846); Pisania tinctus (Conrad, 1846); Pollia tincta Conrad, 1846 (original combination); Tritonidea bermudensis Dall, W.H., 1901; Tritonidea tinctus (Conrad, 1846)

= Gemophos tinctus =

Species of gastropod

Gemophos tinctus, the tinted cantharus, painted cantharus, or gaudy lesser whelk, is a species of sea snail in the family Pisaniidae.

== Description ==
The size of the shell varies between 19 mm and 32 mm.feeds on smal algae

== Distribution ==
This marine species occurs in the Gulf of Mexico, the Caribbean Sea and off the Lesser Antilles; in the Atlantic Ocean off North Carolina, USA. and also in the northeast of Brazil in salt sea water
