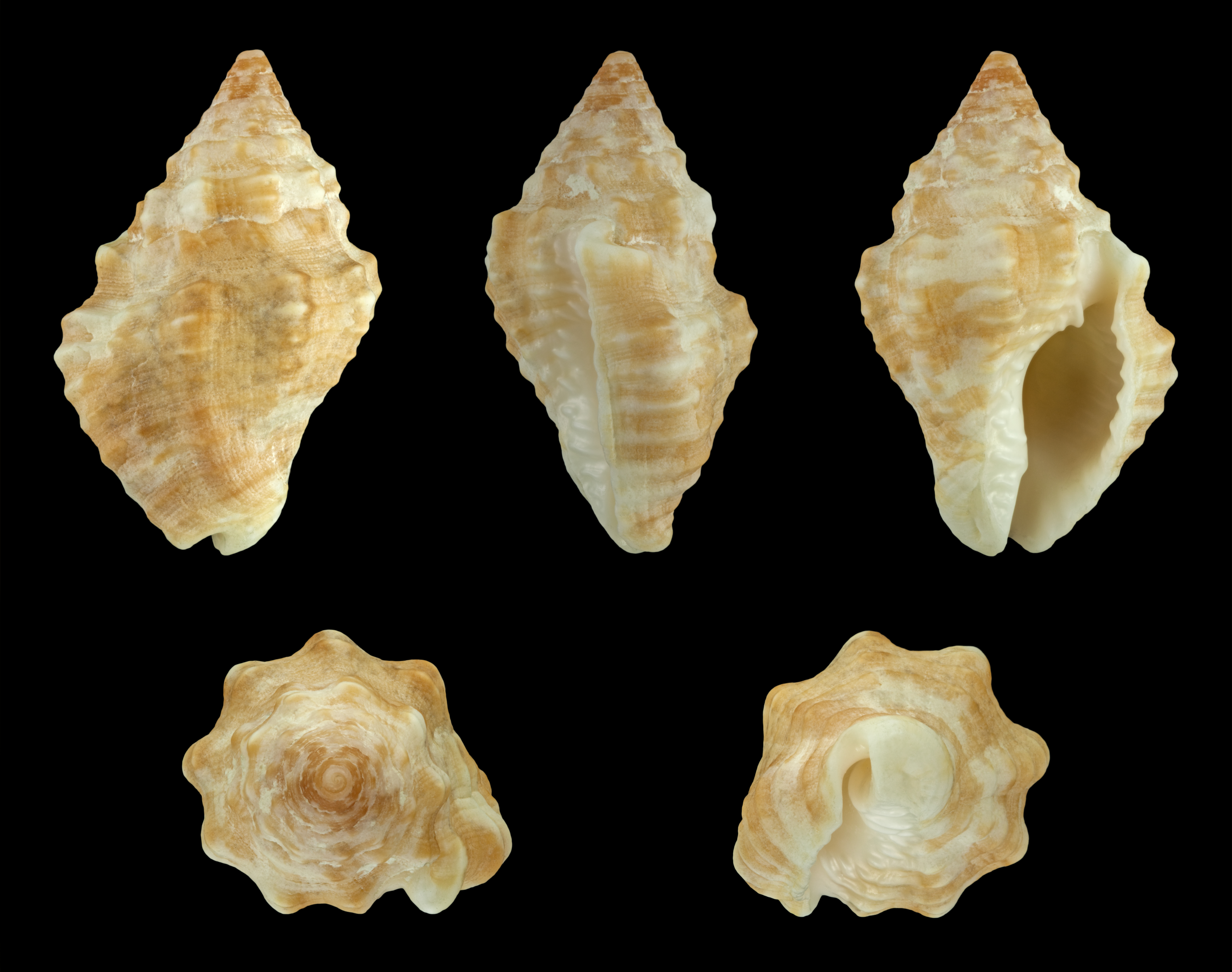
- Shell from Punta Brava, Aruba

Scientific classification
- Kingdom: Animalia
- Phylum: Mollusca
- Class: Gastropoda
- Subclass: Caenogastropoda
- Order: Neogastropoda
- Family: Pisaniidae
- Genus: Gemophos
- Species: G. auritulus

Binomial name
- Gemophos auritulus (Link, 1807)

Synonyms
- Buccinum coromandelianum Lamarck, 1822; Nassaria auritula Link, 1807 (original combination); Pollia auritula (Link, 1807); Triton caribaeum d'Orbigny, 1847

= Gemophos auritulus =

Species of gastropod

Gemophos auritulus, the common cantharus or gaudy cantharus, is a species of sea snail in the family Pisaniidae.

== Description ==
The length of the shell varies between 19 mm and 35 mm.

The ovate shell is thick, solid and bi-conical. It is whitish, covered with a reddish epidermis. It shows nine or ten longitudinal folds, more strongly marked upon the body whorl, rarely prolonged as far as the base, and regularly divided into tubercles by more prominent transverse striae, the interstices of which are furnished with other much finer and very approximate striae. The spire is obtuse at its summit. It is composed of five or six slightly distinct whorls. The lowest is very broad, flattened at its upper part, and subangular. The aperture is white, ovate, narrowed at its base, canaliculated at its upper part, at its union with the outer lip which is thin and denticulated at the edge, striated within. Externally, in adult shells, a pretty prominent varix is observed. The columella is slightly bent, furnished throughout its whole length with small nodules.

== Distribution ==
This species occurs in the Gulf of Mexico, the Caribbean Sea: off the Lesser Antilles and off Puerto Rico; in the Atlantic Ocean from North Carolina to Southern Brazil.
