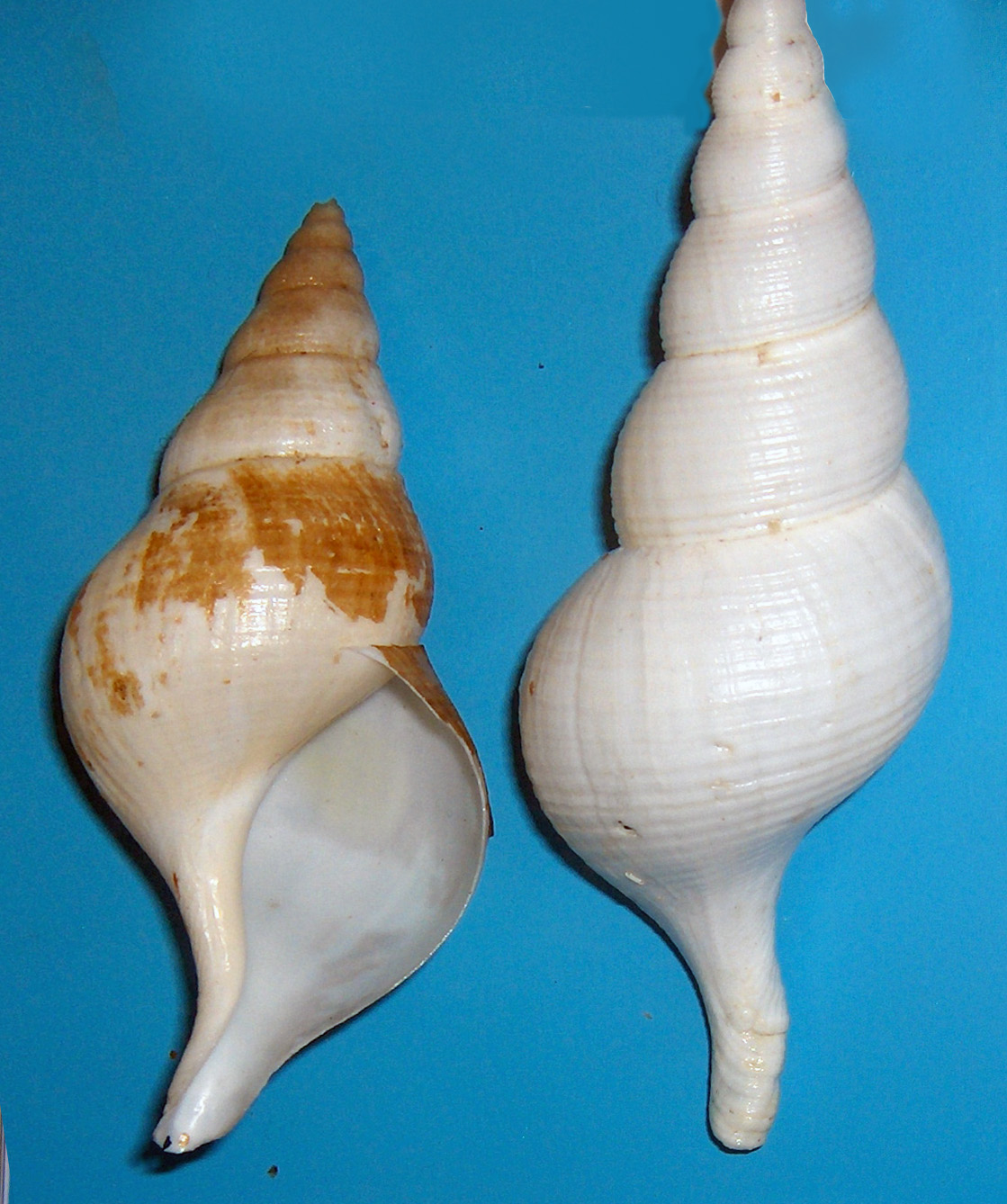
- Two shells of Colus islandicus

Scientific classification
- Kingdom: Animalia
- Phylum: Mollusca
- Class: Gastropoda
- Subclass: Caenogastropoda
- Order: Neogastropoda
- Family: Colidae
- Genus: Colus; Röding, 1798

Type species
- Murex islandicus Mohr, 1786

Synonyms
- Atractus Agassiz, 1839 (invalid: junior homonym of Atractus Wagler, 1828 [Reptilia]; also junior objective synonym of Colus); Chrysodomus (Sipho) Mörch, 1852; Chrysodomus (Siphonorbis) Mörch, 1869 (junior synonym); Colus (Latifusus) Dall, 1916; Fusus (Colus) Röding, 1798; Fusus (Sipho) Mörch, 1852; Fusus (Siphonorbis) Mörch, 1869(original rank); Neptunea (Sipho) Mörch, 1852; Neptunea (Siphonorbis) Mörch, 1869; Plicifusus (Latifusus) Dall, 1916; Sipho Mörch, 1852; Sipho (Siphonorbis) Mörch, 1869; Sipho (Tritonofusus) Beck, 1847; Siphonorbis Mörch, 1869; Tritonofusus Beck, 1847

= Colus =

Colus Temporal range: 66.043–0.0 Ma

Genus of gastropods

Colus (lat. colus, distaff) is a genus of sea snails, marine gastropod mollusks in the family Colidae, the true whelks and the like.

== Evolution ==
Colus is related to the New Zealand genus Austrofusus.

== Taxonomy ==
The name Colus is not available from Humphrey, 1797 (published in a work placed on the Official Index). Most recent authors use the name Colus Röding, 1798 for the genus instead of Sipho Bruguière, 1792. Iredale (1919b) mentioned: "This name cannot be defended by anyone" and was rejected by the ICZN (Op. 21). Also Tritonofusus Beck, 1874 cannot be used because of the rules of priority.

== Species ==
Species within the genus Colus include:

- Colus aurariae Fraussen, Rosado, Afonso & Monteiro, 2009
- Colus azygosorius Tiba, 1980
- Colus barbarinus Dall, 1919
- Colus bukini Kantor, 1984
- Colus gracilis (da Costa, 1778)
- Colus griseus (Dall, 1889)
- Colus halimeris (Dall, 1919)
- Colus holboelli (Møller, 1842)
- Colus islandicus (Mohr, 1786)
- Colus jeffreysianus (Fischer P., 1868)
- Colus kujianus Tiba, 1973
- Colus minor (Dall, 1925): synonym of Plicifusus minor (Dall, 1925)
- Colus pubescens (A. E. Verrill, 1882)
- Colus pulcius (Dall, 1919)
- Colus pygmaeus (Gould, 1841)
- Colus rushii (Dall, 1889)
- Colus sabini (Gray J.E., 1824)
- †Colus sekiuensis Kiel & Goedert, 2007
- Colus stimpsoni (Mørch, 1868)
- Colus syrtensis (Packard, 1867)
- Colus terraenovae Bouchet & Warén, 1985
- Colus trombinus (Dall, 1919)
- Colus turgidulus (Friele, 1877)
- Colus virgulus Paulmier, 2020

Taxon inquirendum

- Colus (Aulacofusus) halidonus (Dall, 1919)

Species represented in the fossil record

- †Colus altus
- †Colus gracilis
- †Colus hollboelli
- †Colus islandicus
- †Colus pygmaeus
- †Colus stimpsoni

== Synonyms ==
A long list of synonyms
- Colus acosmius (Dall, 1891): synonym of Anomalisipho acosmius (Dall, 1891)
- Colus adonis Dall, 1919: synonym of Kanamarua adonis (Dall, 1919) (original combination)
- † Colus altus (S. Wood, 1848): synonym of † Murex pullus S. Woodward, 1833
- Colus aphelus (Dall, 1890): synonym of Latisipho aphelus (Dall, 1890)
- Colus aurantius (Dall, 1907): synonym of Plicifusus rhyssus (Dall, 1907)
- Colus boardmani Iredale, 1930: synonym of Fusinus colus (Linnaeus, 1758)
- Colus brevicauda (Deshayes, 1832): synonym of Aulacofusus brevicauda (Deshayes, 1832)
- Colus bristolensis Dall, 1919: synonym of Colus barbarinus Dall, 1919
- Colus brunneus (Dall, 1877): synonym of Retifusus jessoensis (Schrenck, 1863)
- Colus caelatus (A. E. Verrill, 1880): synonym of Retimohnia caelata (A. E. Verrill, 1880)
- Colus calamaeus (Dall, 1907): synonym of Aulacofusus calamaeus (Dall, 1907)
- Colus calathus Dall, 1919: synonym of Aulacofusus calathus (Dall, 1919) (original combination)
- Colus callorhinus (Dall, 1877): synonym of Plicifusus rodgersi (Gould, 1860)
- Colus capponius Dall, 1919: synonym of Colus pulcius (Dall, 1919)
- Colus clementinus Dall, 1919: synonym of Retimohnia clarki (Dall, 1907)
- Colus consetti Iredale, 1929: synonym of Fusinus consetti (Iredale, 1929)
- Colus cretaceus (Reeve, 1847): synonym of Plicifusus kroyeri (Møller, 1842)
- Colus dautzenbergi Dall, 1916: synonym of Anomalisipho verkruezeni (Kobelt, 1876)
- Colus errones Dall, 1919: synonym of Latisipho errones (Dall, 1919)
- Colus esychus (Dall, 1907): synonym of Aulacofusus esychus (Dall, 1907)
- Colus forceps (Perry, 1811): synonym of Fusinus forceps (Perry, 1811)
- Colus frielei (Kantor, 1981): synonym of Anomalosipho frielei Kantor, 1981: synonym of Anomalisipho verkruezeni (Kobelt, 1876)
- Colus fusiformis (Broderip, 1830): synonym of Turrisipho fenestratus (W. Turton, 1834)
- Colus genticus Iredale, 1936: synonym of Cyrtulus genticus (Iredale, 1936) (original combination)
- Colus georgianus (Dall, 1921): synonym of Latisipho georgianus (Dall, 1921)
- Colus glaber (Verkrüzen, 1876): synonym of Colus gracilis (da Costa, 1778)
- Colus glyptus (A. E. Verrill, 1882): synonym of Retimohnia glypta (A. E. Verrill, 1882)
- Colus halibrectus (Dall, 1891): synonym of Latisipho halibrectus (Dall, 1891)
- Colus hallii (Dall, 1873): synonym of Latisipho hallii (Dall, 1873)
- Colus hankinsi A. H. Clarke, 1960: synonym of Mohnia danielsseni (Friele, 1879)
- Colus hayashii Shikama, 1971: synonym of Calagrassor hayashii (Shikama, 1971) (original combination)
- Colus herendeenii (Dall, 1902): synonym of Aulacofusus herendeeni (Dall, 1902)
- Colus holbolli (Møller, 1842): synonym of Colus holboelli (Møller, 1842)
- Colus howsei (J. T. Marshall, 1902): synonym of Colus jeffreysianus (P. Fischer, 1868)
- Colus hunkinsi A. H. Clarke, 1960: synonym of Mohnia danielsseni (Friele, 1879)
- Colus hypolispus (Dall, 1891): synonym of Latisipho hypolispus (Dall, 1891)
- Colus incisus (Dall, 1919): synonym of Plicifusus olivaceus (Aurivillius, 1885)
- Colus jessoensis (Schrenck, 1863): synonym of Retifusus jessoensis (Schrenck, 1863)
- Colus jordani (Dall, 1913): synonym of Latisipho jordani (Dall, 1913)
- † Colus kaunhoweni Finlay, 1927: synonym of † Columbarium heberti (Briart & Cornet, 1877)
- Colus krampi (Thorson, 1951): synonym of Mohnia krampi (Thorson, 1951)
- Colus kroeyeir (Møller, 1842): synonym of Plicifusus kroyeri (Møller, 1842)
- Colus kroyeri (Møller, 1842): synonym of Plicifusus kroyeri (Møller, 1842)
- Colus lachesis (Mörch, 1869): synonym of Turrisipho lachesis (Mörch, 1869)
- Colus latericeus (Møller, 1842): synonym of Retifusus latericeus (Møller, 1842)
- Colus longicauda (Lamarck, 1801): synonym of Fusinus colus (Linnaeus, 1758)
- Colus martensi (A. Krause, 1885): synonym of Anomalisipho martensi (A. Krause, 1885)
- Colus minor (Dall, 1925): synonym of Plicifusus minor (Dall, 1925)
- Colus mitrellaformis Nomura, 1940: synonym of Daphnella mitrellaformis (Nomura, 1940) (original combination)
- Colus nobilis Dall, 1919: synonym of Aulacofusus herendeeni (Dall, 1902)
- Colus obesus (A. E. Verrill, 1884): synonym of Retimohnia caelata (A. E. Verrill, 1880)
- Colus oceanodromae (Dall, 1919): synonym of Plicifusus oceanodromae Dall, 1919
- Colus okhotskanus Tiba, 1973: synonym of Plicifusus elaeodes (Dall, 1907)
- Colus ombronius Dall, 1919: synonym of Aulacofusus ombronius (Dall, 1919) (original combination)
- Colus parvus (Tiba, 1980): synonym of Retifusus parvus (Tiba, 1980)
- Colus periscelidus (Dall, 1891): synonym of Aulacofusus periscelidus (Dall, 1891)
- Colus roseus (Dall, 1877): synonym of Retifusus roseus (Dall, 1877)
- Colus ryukyuensis Lan, 2002: synonym of Calagrassor poppei (Fraussen, 2001)
- Colus sapius Dall, 1919: synonym of Fusipagoda sapia (Dall, 1919) (original combination)
- Colus severinus (Dall, 1919): synonym of Latisipho severinus (Dall, 1919)
- Colus sinovellus Iredale, 1929: synonym of Fusinus sinovellus (Iredale, 1929) (original combination)
- Colus spitzbergensis (Reeve, 1855): synonym of Aulacofusus brevicauda (Deshayes, 1832)
- Colus stejnegeri (Dall, 1884): synonym of Turrivolutopsius stejnegeri (Dall, 1884): synonym of Volutopsius stejnegeri (Dall, 1884)
- Colus tahwitanus Dall, 1918: synonym of Latisipho tahwitanus (Dall, 1918) (original combination)
- Colus tashiensis Y.-C. Lee & T. C. Lan, 2002: synonym of Calagrassor tashiensis (Y.-C. Lee & T. C. Lan, 2002) (original combination)
- Colus timetus (Dall, 1919): synonym of Latisipho timetus (Dall, 1919)
- Colus togatus (Mörch, 1869): synonym of Colus sabini (J. E. Gray, 1824)
- Colus tortuosus (Reeve, 1855): synonym of Colus holboelli (Møller, 1842)
- Colus trombinus (Dall, 1919): synonym of Limatofusus trombinus (Dall, 1919)
- Colus trophius (Dall, 1919): synonym of Aulacofusus trophius Dall, 1919
- Colus ventricosus (Gray, 1839): synonym of Colus terraenovae Bouchet & Warén, 1985
- Colus verkruezeni (Kobelt, 1876): synonym of Anomalisipho verkruezeni (Kobelt, 1876)
- Colus virens (Dall, 1877): synonym of Retifusus virens (Dall, 1877)
