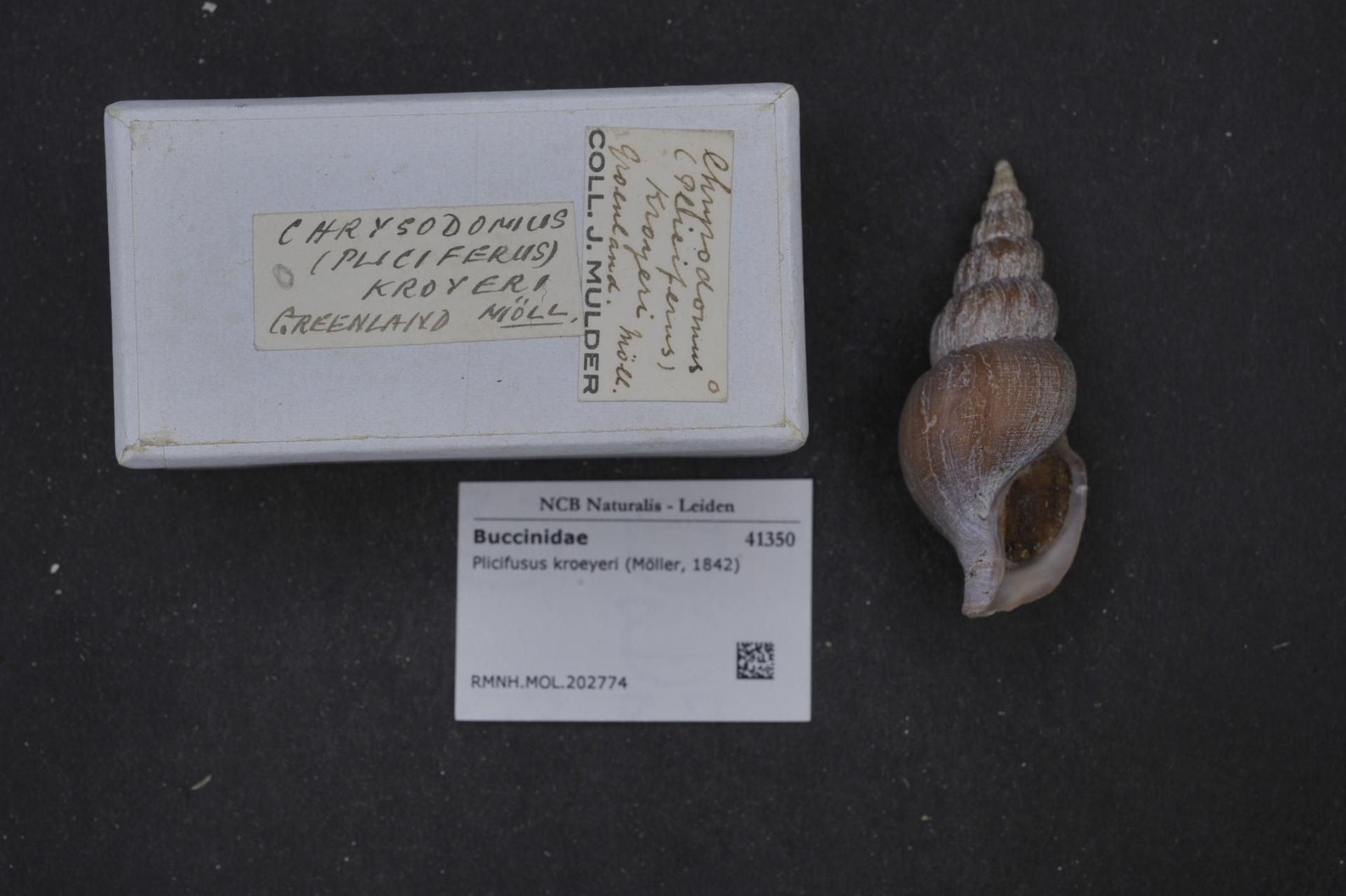
- Plicifusus kroyeri shell

Scientific classification
- Kingdom: Animalia
- Phylum: Mollusca
- Class: Gastropoda
- Subclass: Caenogastropoda
- Order: Neogastropoda
- Superfamily: Buccinoidea
- Family: Buccinidae
- Genus: Plicifusus; Dall, 1902

Type species
- Murex islandicus Mohr, 1786

Synonyms
- Parasipho Dautzenberg & H. Fischer, 1912; Quasisipho Petrov, 1982

= Plicifusus =

Genus of gastropods

Plicifusus is a genus of sea snails, marine gastropod mollusks in the family Buccinidae, the true whelks.

== Species ==
Species within the genus Plicifusus include:

- Plicifusus bambusus Tiba, 1980
- Plicifusus croceus (Dall, 1907)
- Plicifusus elaeodus (Dall, 1907)
- Plicifusus hastarius Tiba, 1983
- Plicifusus johanseni Dall, 1919
- Plicifusus kroyeri (Möller, 1842)
- Plicifusus levis Tiba, 1983
- Plicifusus maehirai Tiba, 1980
- Plicifusus mcleani Sirenko, 2009
- Plicifusus minor (Dall, 1925)
- Plicifusus oceanodromae Dall, 1919
- Plicifusus olivaceus (Aurivillius, 1885)
- Plicifusus rhyssus (Dall, 1907)
- Plicifusus rodgersi (Gould, 1860)
- Plicifusus scissuratus Dall, 1918
- Plicifusus torquatus (Petrov, 1982)

Species brought into synonymy

- Plicifusus (Microfusus) Dall, 1916: synonym of Nassaria Link, 1807
- Plicifusus (Retifusus) Dall, 1916: synonym of Retifusus Dall, 1916
- Plicifusus arcticus (Philippi, 1850): synonym of Plicifusus kroeyeri (Möller, 1842)
- Plicifusus attenuatus (Golikov & Gulbin, 1977): synonym of Retifusus attenuatus (Golikov & Gulbin, 1977)
- Plicifusus barbarinus (Dall, 1919): synonym of Colus barbarinus Dall, 1919
- Plicifusus brunneus: synonym of Retifusus jessoensis (Schrenck, 1863)
- Plicifusus incisus Dall, 1919: synonym of Plicifusus olivaceus (Aurivillius, 1885)
- Plicifusus iwateana (Tiba, 1981): synonym of Mohnia iwateana Tiba, 1981
- Plicifusus jamarci Okutani, 1982: synonym of Gaillea canetae (Clench & Aguayo, 1944)
- Plicifusus kroyeri [sic] : synonym of Plicifusus kroeyeri (Möller, 1842)
- Plicifusus manchuricus (A. Adams in E.A.Smith, 1875): synonym of Retifusus jessoensis (Schrenck, 1863)
- Plicifusus multicostatus (Habe & Ito, 1965): synonym of Retimohnia multicostata (Habe & Ito, 1965)
- Plicifusus obtustatus Golikov, in Golikov & Scarlato, 1985: synonym of Plicifusus kroeyeri (Möller, 1842)
- Plicifusus okhotskana Tiba, 1973: synonym of Plicifusus elaeodes (Dall, 1907)
- Plicifusus olivaceus Bartsch, 1929: synonym of Retifusus olivaceus (Bartsch, 1929)
- Plicifusus parvus Tiba, 1980: synonym of Retifusus roseus (Dall, 1877)
- Plicifusus polypleuratus (Dall, 1907): synonym of Plicifusus kroeyeri (Möller, 1842)
- Plicifusus pulcius (Dall, 1919): synonym of Colus pulcius (Dall, 1919)
- Plicifusus rhyssoides Dall, 1918: synonym ofPlicifusus rhyssus (Dall, 1907)
- Plicifusus saginatus Tiba, 1983: synonym of Retifusus roseus (Dall, 1877)
- Plicifusus semiplicatus (Golikov, in Golikov & Scarlato, 1985): synonym of Retifusus roseus (Dall, 1877)
- Plicifusus similis (Golikov & Gulbin, 1977): synonym of Retifusus similis (Golikov & Gulbin, 1977)
- Plicifusus stejnegeri (Dall, 1884): synonym of Turrivolutopsius stejnegeri (Dall, 1884)
- Plicifusus sugiyamai Ozaki, 1958 † : synonym of Plicifusus rhyssoides Dall, 1918
- Plicifusus wakasanus Dall, 1918: synonym of Plicifusus rhyssus (Dall, 1907)
- Plicifusus yanamii (Yokoyama, 1926): synonym of Retifusus yanamii (Yokoyama, 1926)
