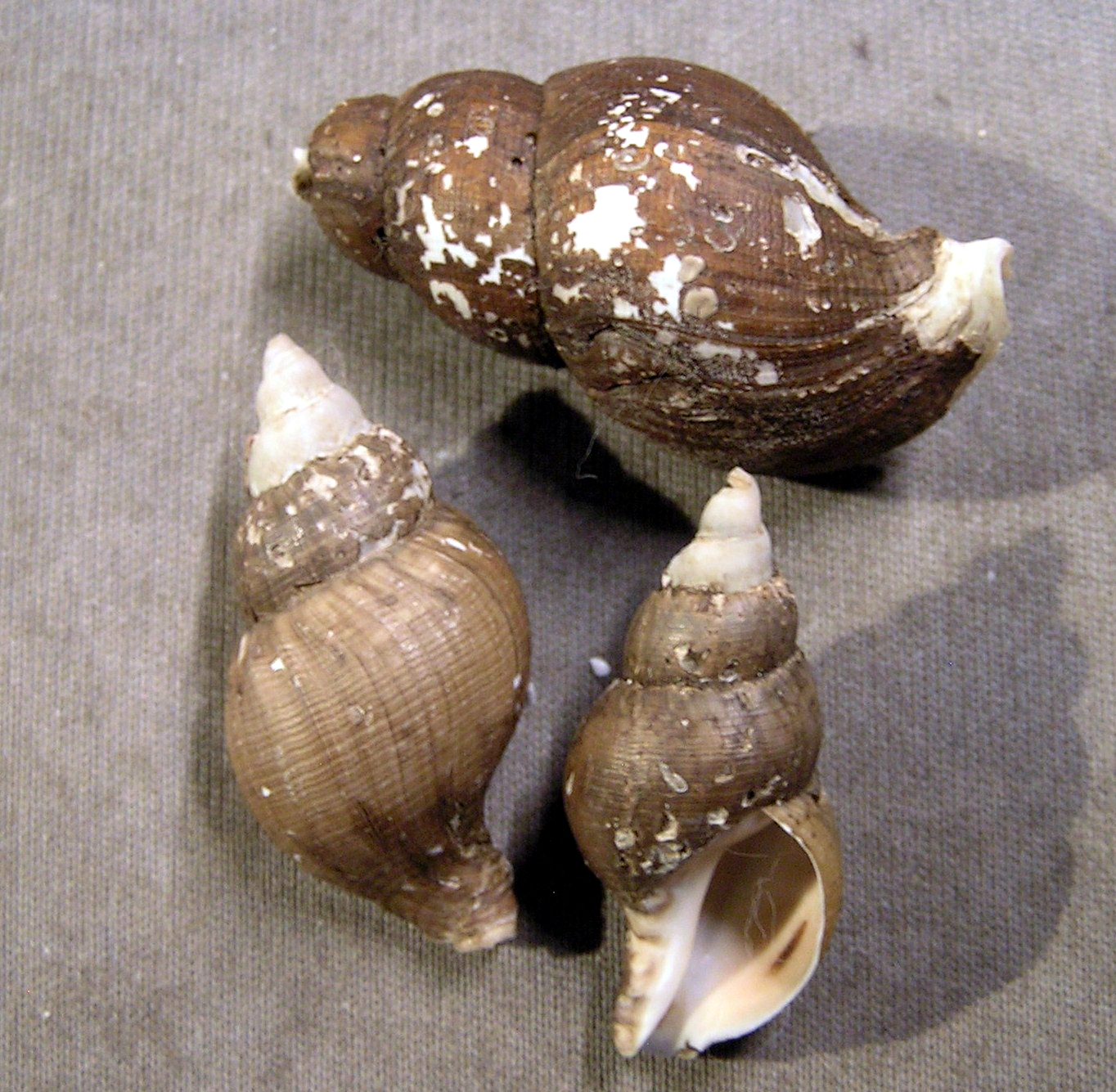
- Three views of a shell of Latisipho jordani

Scientific classification
- Kingdom: Animalia
- Phylum: Mollusca
- Class: Gastropoda
- Subclass: Caenogastropoda
- Order: Neogastropoda
- Superfamily: Buccinoidea
- Family: Buccinidae
- Genus: Latisipho; Dall, 1916

Type species
- Chrysodomus (Sipho) hypolispus Dall, 1891

Synonyms
- Aulacofusus (Limatofusus) Dall, 1918; Colus (Latisipho) Dall, 1916; Limatofusus Dall, 1918

= Latisipho =

Genus of gastropods

Latisipho is a genus of sea snails, marine gastropod mollusks, unassigned in a subfamily of the family Buccinidae, the true whelks.

== Species ==
Species within the genus Latisipho include:

- Latisipho aphelus (Dall, 1889)
- Latisipho errones (Dall, 1919)
- Latisipho georgianus (Dall, 1921)
- Latisipho halibrectus (Dall, 1891)
- Latisipho hallii (Dall, 1873)
- Latisipho hypolispus (Dall, 1891)
- Latisipho jordani (Dall, 1913)
- Latisipho morditus (Dall, 1919)
- Latisipho pharcidus (Dall, 1919)
- Latisipho ritteri R. N. Clark, 2022
- Latisipho severinus (Dall, 1919)
- Latisipho siphonoidea (Dall, 1913)
- Latisipho tahwitanus (Dall, 1918)
- Latisipho timetus (Dall, 1919)

Species brought into synonymy

- Latisipho acosmius (Dall, 1891): synonym of Anomalisipho acosmius (Dall, 1891)
- Latisipho bristolensis (Dall, 1919): synonym of Colus barbarinus Dall, 1919
- Latisipho halidonus (Dall, 1919): synonym of Colus halidonus (Dall, 1919)
- Latisipho hypolispus (Dall, 1891): synonym of Neptunea intersculpta (G. B. Sowerby III, 1899)
