= Colus halimeris =

Scientific classification
- Kingdom: Animalia
- Phylum: Mollusca
- Class: Gastropoda
- Subclass: Caenogastropoda
- Order: Neogastropoda
- Superfamily: Buccinoidea
- Family: Colidae
- Genus: Colus
- Species: C. halimeris

Binomial name
- Colus halimeris Dall, 1919

Synonyms
- Aulacofusus halimeris Dall, 1919 (original combination); Limatofusus halimeris (Dall, 1919)

Species of gastropod

Colus halimeris is a species of sea snail, a marine gastropod mollusk in the family Colidae, the true whelks and the like.

== Distribution ==
Its range is from British Columbia to San Diego, California.
