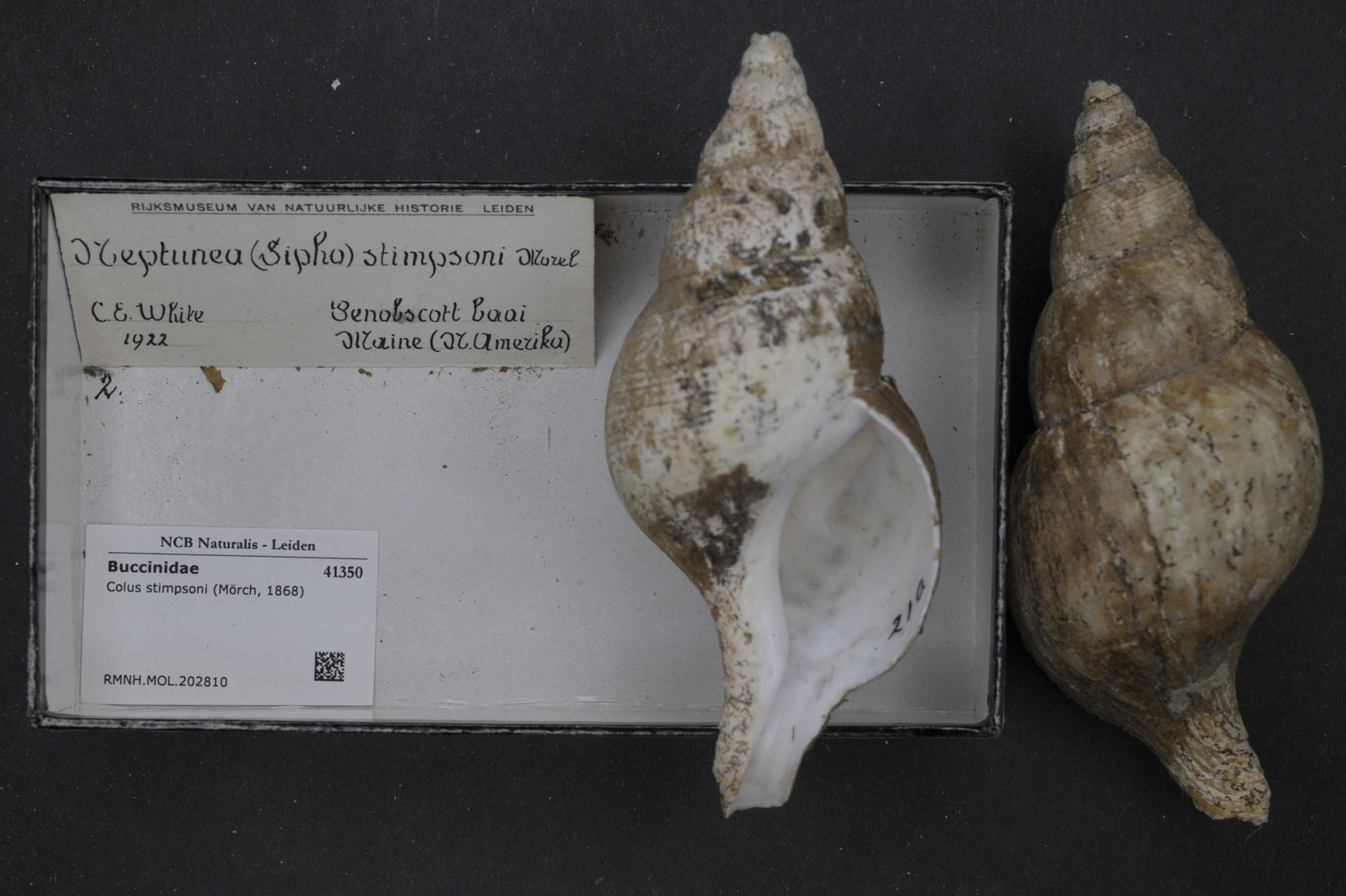
- Colus stimpsoni shells

Scientific classification
- Kingdom: Animalia
- Phylum: Mollusca
- Class: Gastropoda
- Subclass: Caenogastropoda
- Order: Neogastropoda
- Superfamily: Buccinoidea
- Family: Colidae
- Genus: Colus
- Species: C. stimpsoni

Binomial name
- Colus stimpsoni (Mørch, 1868)

Synonyms
- Fusus curtus Jeffreys, 1867 · unaccepted (invalid: junior homonym of Fusus...); Fusus solidulus G. B. Sowerby II, 1880 (preoccupied); Fusus stimpsonii Mörch, 1870 (original combination); Fusus striatus Reeve, 1847 (invalid: junior homonym of Fusus striatus G. B. Sowerby I, 1833); Neptunea (Sipho) arata Verrill, 1880 ·; Neptunea arata Verrill, 1880; Sipho stimpsoni var. brevis Verrill, 1882 d; Sipho stimpsonii (Mörch, 1868); Sipho stimpsonii var. liratulus Verrill, 1882; Tritonofusus stimpsoni (Mörch, 1868)

= Colus stimpsoni =

Species of gastropod

Colus stimpsoni, common name the Stimpson's colus, is a species of sea snail, a marine gastropod mollusk in the family Colidae, the true whelks and the like.

== Distribution ==
The species has been found in the Bay of Fundy in Canada, and various other gulfs situated about the western shores of northern America.
