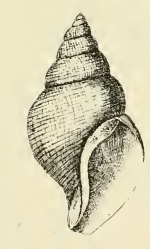
- Drawing of a shell of Turrisipho moebii

Scientific classification
- Kingdom: Animalia
- Phylum: Mollusca
- Class: Gastropoda
- Subclass: Caenogastropoda
- Order: Neogastropoda
- Superfamily: Buccinoidea
- Family: Colidae
- Genus: Turrisipho
- Species: T. moebii

Binomial name
- Turrisipho moebii (Dunker & Metzger, 1874)

Synonyms
- Neptunea moebii Dunker & Metzger, 1874; Sipho moebii (Dunker & Metzger, 1874); Sipho sarsi G. O. Sars, 1878 (junior synonym); Tritonofusus moebii Dunker & Metzger, 1875 ·

= Turrisipho moebii =

Species of mollusc

Turrisipho moebii is a species of sea snail, a marine gastropod mollusk in the family Colidae, the true whelks and the like.

== Description ==
The length of the shell attains 50 mm.

== Distribution ==
This marine species occurs off Iceland.
