= Colus syrtensis =

Scientific classification
- Kingdom: Animalia
- Phylum: Mollusca
- Class: Gastropoda
- Subclass: Caenogastropoda
- Order: Neogastropoda
- Superfamily: Buccinoidea
- Family: Colidae
- Genus: Colus
- Species: C. syrtensis

Binomial name
- Colus syrtensis Packard, 1867

Synonyms
- Fusus syrtensis Packard, 1867 ·

Species of gastropod

Colus syrtensis is a species of sea snail, a marine gastropod mollusk in the family Colidae, the true whelks and the like.
