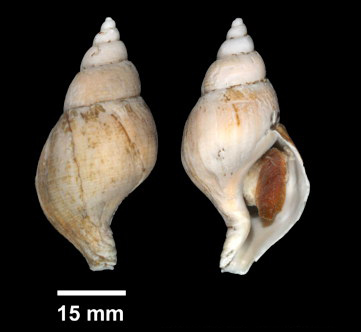
- Two views of a shell of Colus pubescens

Scientific classification
- Kingdom: Animalia
- Phylum: Mollusca
- Class: Gastropoda
- Subclass: Caenogastropoda
- Order: Neogastropoda
- Superfamily: Buccinoidea
- Family: Colidae
- Genus: Colus
- Species: C. pubescens

Binomial name
- Colus pubescens (A. E. Verrill, 1882)

Synonyms
- Sipho pubescens A. E. Verrill, 1882 (original combination)

= Colus pubescens =

Species of gastropod

Colus pubescens, common name the hairy colus, is a species of sea snail, a marine gastropod mollusk in the family Colidae, the true whelks and the like.
