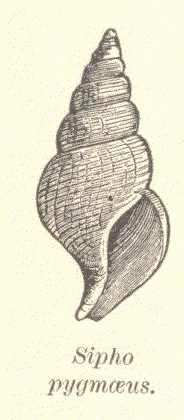
- Colus pygmaeus shell

Scientific classification
- Kingdom: Animalia
- Phylum: Mollusca
- Class: Gastropoda
- Subclass: Caenogastropoda
- Order: Neogastropoda
- Superfamily: Buccinoidea
- Family: Colidae
- Genus: Colus
- Species: C. pygmaeus

Binomial name
- Colus pygmaeus (Gould, 1841)

Synonyms
- Fusus islandicus var. pygmaeus Gould, 1841 (basionym); Fusus trumbulli Linsley, 1845 ·; Sipho pygmaeus (Gould, 1841); Sipho pygmaeus var. planulus Verrill, 1882; Siphonorbis pygmaeus (Gould, 1841)

= Colus pygmaeus =

Species of gastropod

Colus pygmaeus, common name the pygmy whelk, is a species of sea snail, a marine gastropod mollusk in the family Colidae, the true whelks and the like.

== Description ==
The length of the shell attains 23.9 mm. The shell body is dextrally coiled (right-handed).

== Distribution ==
This species occurs in the Northeast Atlantic Ocean. Colus pygmaeus is currently undergoing steep population declines, which has already led to, or if unchecked is likely to lead to, local extinction and/or range contraction.
