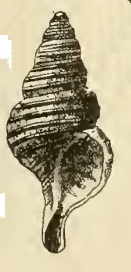
- Drawing of a shell of Turrisipho dalli

Scientific classification
- Kingdom: Animalia
- Phylum: Mollusca
- Class: Gastropoda
- Subclass: Caenogastropoda
- Order: Neogastropoda
- Superfamily: Buccinoidea
- Family: Colidae
- Genus: Turrisipho
- Species: T. dalli

Binomial name
- Turrisipho dalli (Friele in Tryon, 1881)

Synonyms
- Neptunea (Siphonorbis) dalli Friele, 1882 (basionym); Sipho dalli Friele, 1881

= Turrisipho dalli =

Species of gastropod

Turrisipho dalli is a species of sea snail, a marine gastropod mollusk in the family Colidae, the true whelks.

== Description ==
The length of the shell attains 10 mm (0.39 in).

== Distribution ==
This species occurs in the Atlantic Ocean off Canada.
