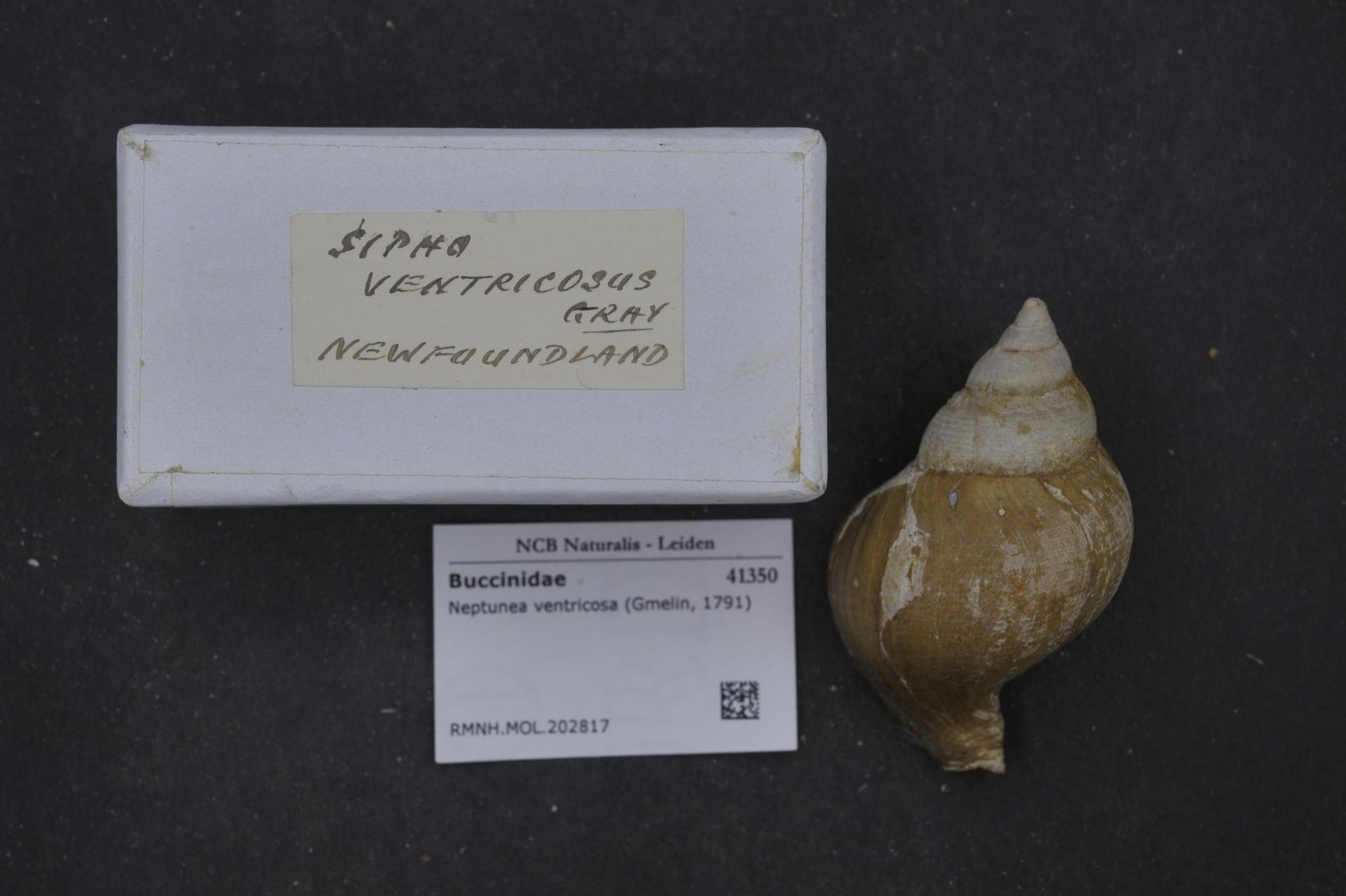
- Naturalis Biodiversity Center - RMNH.MOL.202817 1 - Colus terraenovae Bouchet & Warèn, 1985 - Buccinidae - Mollusc shell

Scientific classification
- Kingdom: Animalia
- Phylum: Mollusca
- Class: Gastropoda
- Subclass: Caenogastropoda
- Order: Neogastropoda
- Family: Colidae
- Genus: Colus
- Species: C. terraenovae

Binomial name
- Colus terraenovae Bouchet & Warén, 1985

Synonyms
- Colus ventricosus (J. E. Gray, 1839); Fusus ventricosus Gray, 1839 (invalid: junior homonym of Fusus ventricosus Anton, 1838; Colus terraenovae is a replacement name)

= Colus terraenovae =

Species of gastropod

Colus terraenovae is a species of sea snail, a marine gastropod mollusk in the family Colidae, the true whelks and the like.

== Description ==
The length of the shell attains 58 mm.

== Distribution ==
This marine species occurs off Newfoundland, Canada.
