= Turrisipho voeringi =

Scientific classification
- Kingdom: Animalia
- Phylum: Mollusca
- Class: Gastropoda
- Subclass: Caenogastropoda
- Order: Neogastropoda
- Superfamily: Buccinoidea
- Family: Colidae
- Genus: Turrisipho
- Species: T. voeringi

Binomial name
- Turrisipho voeringi Bouchet & Warén, 1985

Synonyms
- Neptunea lachesis var. bicarinata Friele, 1879

Species of gastropod

Turrisipho voeringi is a species of sea snail, a marine gastropod mollusk in the family Colidae, the true whelks and the like.
