= Colus turgidulus =

Scientific classification
- Kingdom: Animalia
- Phylum: Mollusca
- Class: Gastropoda
- Subclass: Caenogastropoda
- Order: Neogastropoda
- Superfamily: Buccinoidea
- Family: Colidae
- Genus: Colus
- Species: C. turgidulus

Binomial name
- Colus turgidulus (Friele, 1877)

Synonyms
- Fusus turgidulus Friele, 1877; Sipho turgidulus (Friele, 1877) ·

Species of gastropod

Colus turgidulus is a species of sea snail, a marine gastropod mollusk in the family Colidae, the true whelks and the like.

== Distribution ==
This marine species occurs off Ireland.
