= Colus azygosorius =

Scientific classification
- Kingdom: Animalia
- Phylum: Mollusca
- Class: Gastropoda
- Subclass: Caenogastropoda
- Order: Neogastropoda
- Family: Colidae
- Genus: Colus
- Species: C. azygosorius

Binomial name
- Colus azygosorius Tiba, 1980

Species of gastropod

Colus azygosorius is a species of sea snail, a marine gastropod mollusk in the family Colidae, the true whelks and the like.
