= Colus holboelli =

Scientific classification
- Kingdom: Animalia
- Phylum: Mollusca
- Class: Gastropoda
- Subclass: Caenogastropoda
- Order: Neogastropoda
- Superfamily: Buccinoidea
- Family: Colidae
- Genus: Colus
- Species: C. holboelli

Binomial name
- Colus holboelli (Møller, 1842)

Synonyms
- Colus holbolli (Møller, 1842) ·; Colus tortuosus (Reeve, 1855); Fusus delicatus Jeffreys, 1883; Fusus holboelli Møller, 1842 (basionym); Fusus tortuosus Reeve, 1855; Sipho togatus var. crassa Harmer, 1914; Sipho tortuosus (Reeve, 1855); Sipho tortuosus var. attenuata G. O. Sars, 1878 junior subjective synonym; Siphonorbis turritus var. distincta Posselt, 1895

Species of gastropod

Colus holboelli is a species of sea snail, a marine gastropod mollusk in the family Colidae, the true whelks and the like.

== Description ==
The length of the shell attains 61.4 mm.

== Distribution ==
This marine species occurs off Svalbard.
