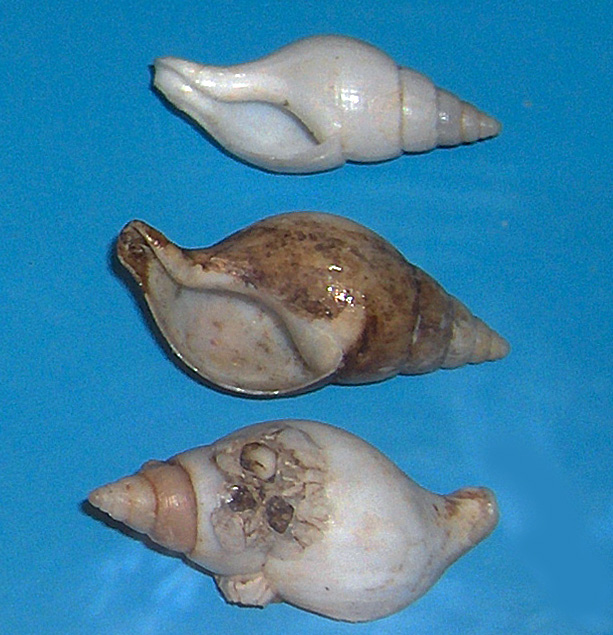

Scientific classification
- Kingdom: Animalia
- Phylum: Mollusca
- Class: Gastropoda
- Subclass: Caenogastropoda
- Order: Neogastropoda
- Family: Colidae
- Genus: Colus
- Species: C. jeffreysianus

Binomial name
- Colus jeffreysianus (P. Fischer, 1868)

Synonyms
- Colus howsei (J. T. Marshall, 1902); Fusus (Sipho) pupula Fischer P., 1883; Fusus attenuatus Jeffreys, 1877; Fusus consimilis Marshall, 1902; Fusus jeffreysianus Fischer P., 1868; Fusus propinquus Alder, 1848; Fusus propinquus var. howsei Marshall, 1902; Fusus propinquus var. laevis Marshall, 1902; Neptunia jeffreysiana (Fischer P., 1868); Neptunia jeffreysiana var. bicolor Locard, 1896; Neptunia jeffreysiana var. elongata Locard, 1896; Neptunia jeffreysiana var. major Locard, 1896; Neptunia jeffreysiana var. minor Locard, 1896; Neptunia jeffreysiana var. ventricosa Locard, 1896; Neptunia pupoidea Locard, 1897; Neptunia torra Locard, 1897; Sipho turritus (M. Sars, 1859); Siphonorbis marshalli Iredale, 1918; Tritonium turritum Sars M., 1859

= Colus jeffreysianus =

Species of gastropod

Colus jeffreysianus is a species of sea snail, a marine gastropod mollusk in the family Colidae, the true whelks and the like.

== Description ==
The length of the shell attains 58.3 mm.

== Distribution ==
This species occurs in the North Sea, the North Atlantic Ocean and in the Mediterranean Sea.
