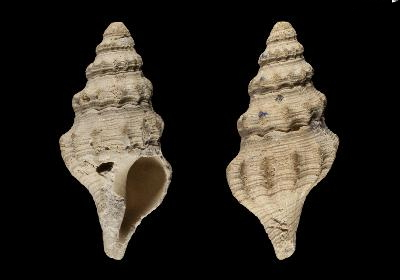
- Shell of Kryptos koehleri (specimen at MNHN, Paris)

Scientific classification
- Kingdom: Animalia
- Phylum: Mollusca
- Class: Gastropoda
- Subclass: Caenogastropoda
- Order: Neogastropoda
- Family: Colidae
- Genus: Kryptos
- Species: K. koehleri

Binomial name
- Kryptos koehleri (Locard, 1896)

Synonyms
- Kryptos elegans Dautzenberg & H. Fischer, 1896; Pleurotomella atlantica Locard, 1897; Pleurotomella demulcata Locard, 1897; Pleurotomella koehleri Locard, 1896

= Kryptos koehleri =

Species of gastropod

Kryptos koehleri is a species of sea snail, a marine gastropod mollusc in the family Colidae, the true whelks and the like.

== Description ==
The length of the shell varies between 10 mm and 20 mm.

== Distribution ==
This species occurs in the North Atlantic Ocean (Bay of Biscay, Morocco, Azores)
