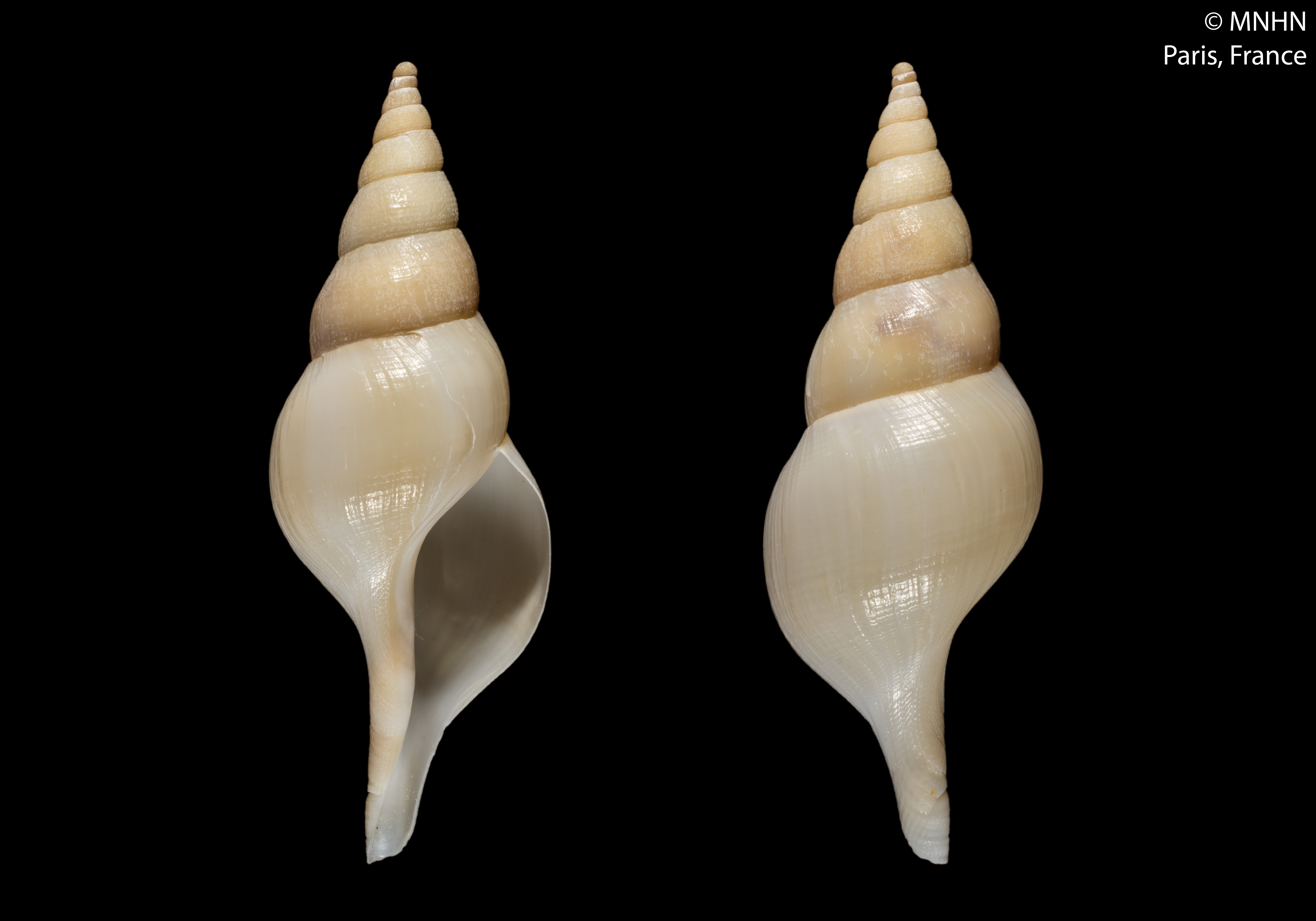

Scientific classification
- Kingdom: Animalia
- Phylum: Mollusca
- Class: Gastropoda
- Subclass: Caenogastropoda
- Order: Neogastropoda
- Family: Colidae
- Genus: Colus
- Species: C. aurariae

Binomial name
- Colus aurariae Fraussen, Rosado, Afonso & Monteiro, 2009

= Colus aurariae =

Species of gastropod

Colus aurariae is a species of sea snail, a marine gastropod mollusk in the family Colidae, the true whelks and the like.
