= Colus rushii =

Scientific classification
- Kingdom: Animalia
- Phylum: Mollusca
- Class: Gastropoda
- Subclass: Caenogastropoda
- Order: Neogastropoda
- Superfamily: Buccinoidea
- Family: Colidae
- Genus: Colus
- Species: C. rushii

Binomial name
- Colus rushii Dall, 1889

Synonyms
- Chrysodomus (Sipho) rushii Dall, 1889 (basionym); Chrysodomus rushii Dall, 1889 ·

Species of gastropod

Colus rushii is a species of sea snail, a marine gastropod mollusc in the family Colidae, the true whelks and the like.
