= Colus kujianus =

Scientific classification
- Kingdom: Animalia
- Phylum: Mollusca
- Class: Gastropoda
- Subclass: Caenogastropoda
- Order: Neogastropoda
- Family: Colidae
- Genus: Colus
- Species: C. kujianus

Binomial name
- Colus kujianus Tiba, 1973

Synonyms
- Colus esychus kujiana R. Tiba, 1973

Species of gastropod

Colus kujianus is a species of sea snail, a marine gastropod mollusk in the family Colidae, the true whelks and the like.

== Distribution ==
This marine species occurs off of eastern Honshu, Japan, at depths of about 170 meters.
