= Colus griseus =

Scientific classification
- Kingdom: Animalia
- Phylum: Mollusca
- Class: Gastropoda
- Subclass: Caenogastropoda
- Order: Neogastropoda
- Superfamily: Buccinoidea
- Family: Colidae
- Genus: Colus
- Species: C. griseus

Binomial name
- Colus griseus Dall, 1889

Synonyms
- Chrysodomus griseus Dall, 1890

Species of gastropod

Colus griseus is a species of sea snail, a marine gastropod mollusc in the family Colidae, the true whelks and the like. It was first discovered in 1889.

== Distribution ==
This marine species occurs in the Indo-Pacific.
