= Colus bukini =

Scientific classification
- Kingdom: Animalia
- Phylum: Mollusca
- Class: Gastropoda
- Subclass: Caenogastropoda
- Order: Neogastropoda
- Family: Colidae
- Genus: Colus
- Species: C. bukini

Binomial name
- Colus bukini Kantor, 1984

Species of gastropod

Colus bukini is a species of sea snail, a marine gastropod mollusk in the family Colidae, the true whelks and the like.

== Distribution ==
This marine species occurs off the Kuril Islands at 1000-2000 m.
