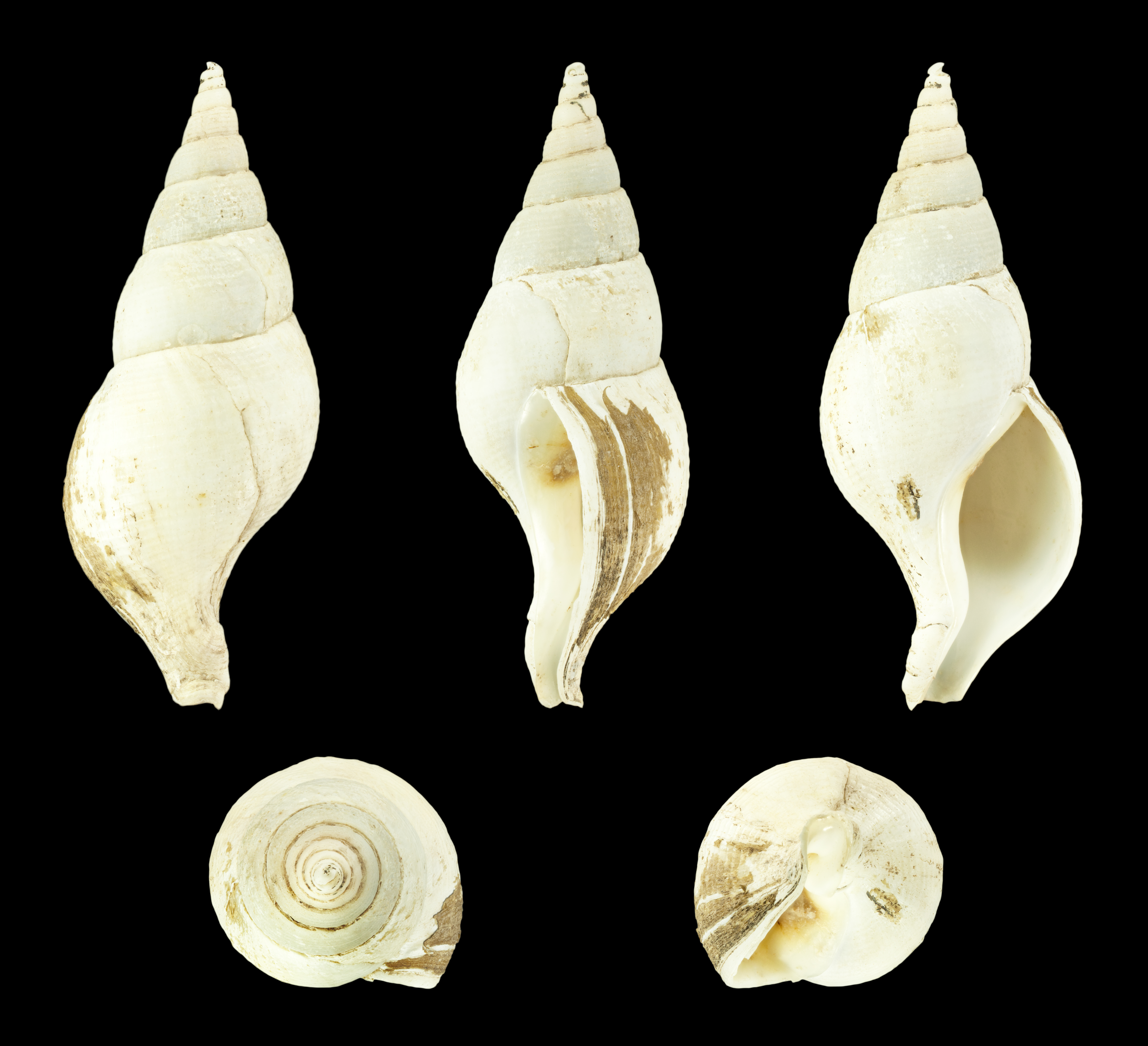

Scientific classification
- Kingdom: Animalia
- Phylum: Mollusca
- Class: Gastropoda
- Subclass: Caenogastropoda
- Order: Neogastropoda
- Family: Colidae
- Genus: Colus
- Species: C. gracilis

Binomial name
- Colus gracilis (da Costa, 1778)

Synonyms
- Buccinum gracile da Costa, 1778; Colus glaber (Verkrüzen in Kobelt, 1876); Fusus gracilis (da Costa, 1778); Fusus gracilis var. belliana Jordan, 1890; Fusus gracilis var. convoluta Jeffreys, 1867; Fusus gracilis var. coulsoni Jordan, 1890; Fusus listeri Jonas, 1846; Neptunia gracilis (da Costa, 1778); Neptunia gracilis var. major Locard, 1896; Neptunia nicolloni Locard, 1891; Sipho glaber Verkrüzen in Kobelt, 1876; Sipho gracilis (da Costa, 1778); Sipho gracilis var. glabra Verkrüzen in Kobelt, 1876; Sipho togatus var. frielei Harmer, 1914; Sipho turgidulus var. minor Thorson, 1944; Tritonium islandicum var. striata Middendorff, 1849

= Colus gracilis =

Species of gastropod

Colus gracilis is a species of sea snail, a marine gastropod mollusk in the family Buccinidae, the true whelks and the like.

== Description ==
A smooth form with flatter whorls, 40 to 100 mm in length, but a highly variable species that occurs in several morphologically different geographical and bathymetrical forms; these forms may look identical over large areas, then give an impression that several near species are involved.

== Distribution ==
{It lives on sand to mud bottoms, between 50 and 1500 m, from northern Norway to Portugal. A species frequently accidentally fished by fishing trap fishermen from the Channel and the Bay of Biscay, such as those from the port of Conquet in Brittany; this fishing trap fishery is the only one that brings this difficultly accessible species back to land. See Bouchet and Waren 1985. See also European Seashells Vol.1, from Poppe and Goto 1991.}
