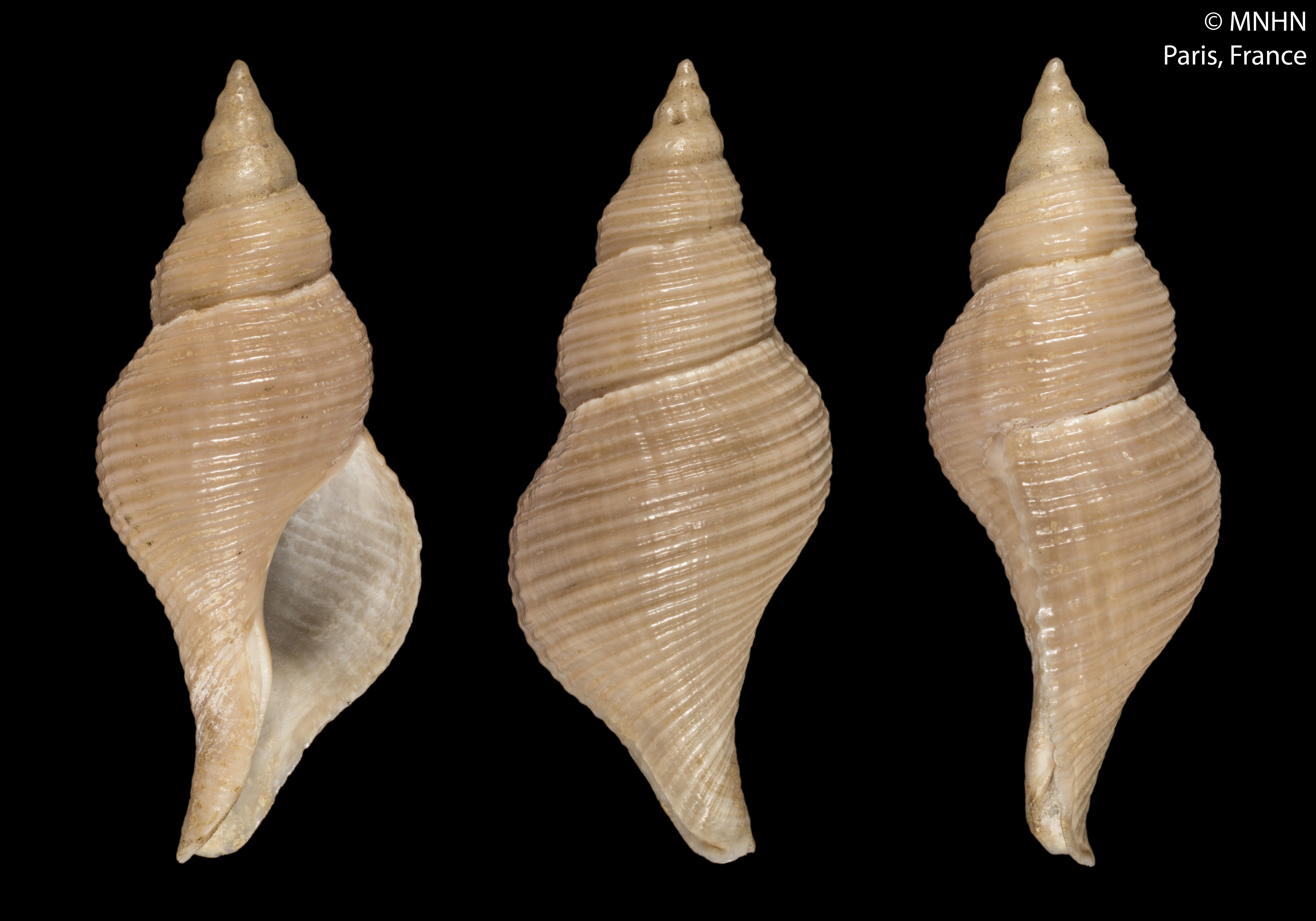
- Shell of Colus sabini (holotype at MNHN, Paris)

Scientific classification
- Kingdom: Animalia
- Phylum: Mollusca
- Class: Gastropoda
- Subclass: Caenogastropoda
- Order: Neogastropoda
- Family: Colidae
- Genus: Colus
- Species: C. sabini

Binomial name
- Colus sabini (Gray J.E., 1824)

Synonyms
- Buccinum sabini Gray, 1824 (basionym); Colus togatus (Mörch, 1869); Fusus (Siphonorbis) pfaffi Mörch, 1876 ·; Fusus ebur Mörch, 1869; Fusus hirsutus Jeffreys, 1883; Fusus pfaffi Mörch, 1876; Fusus reeveanus Petit de la Saussaye, 1846; Fusus togatus Mörch, 1869; Neptunea hanseni Friele, 1879; Sipho brevispira Brögger, 1900; Sipho togatus (Mörch, 1869); Sipho togatus var. sinuosa Brögger, 1900; Sipho togatus var. vallensis Brögger, 1900; Siphonorbis ebur (Mörch, 1869)

= Colus sabini =

Species of gastropod

Colus sabini is a species of sea snail, a marine gastropod mollusk in the family Colidae, the true whelks and the like.

== Distribution ==
This species occurs in the North Atlantic Ocean; alo off Japan.
