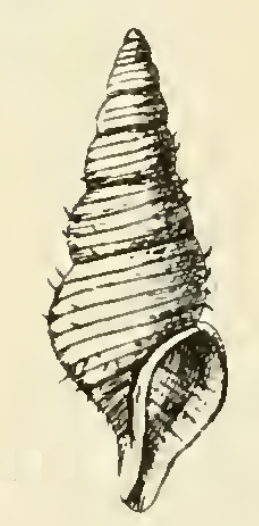
- = Drawing of a shell of Turrisipho lachesis

Scientific classification
- Kingdom: Animalia
- Phylum: Mollusca
- Class: Gastropoda
- Subclass: Caenogastropoda
- Order: Neogastropoda
- Superfamily: Buccinoidea
- Family: Colidae
- Genus: Turrisipho
- Species: T. lachesis

Binomial name
- Turrisipho lachesis (Mørch, 1869)

Synonyms
- Colus lachesis (Mørch, 1869); Fusus lachesis Mørch, 1869; Fusus (Siphonorbis) lachesis Mörch, 186 (basionym); Neptunea lachesis (Mörch, 1869); Sipho (Tritonofusus) costiferus Posselt & A. S. Jensen, 1898; Sipho costiferus Posselt, 1898; Sipho undulatus Friele, 1881; Turrisipho undulatus (Friele in Tryon, 1881) ·

= Turrisipho lachesis =

Species of gastropod

Turrisipho lachesis is a species of sea snail, a marine gastropod mollusk in the family Colidae, the true whelks and the like.

== Description ==
The length of the shell attains 44.1 mm. The shell is pinkish white under a coriaceous epidermis.

== Distribution ==
Range: 74°N to 46.08°N; 78°W to 0°W. Distribution: Greenland; Greenland: West Greenland, East Greenland; Canada; Canada: Queen Elizabeth Islands; also off Norway and the Barents Sea
