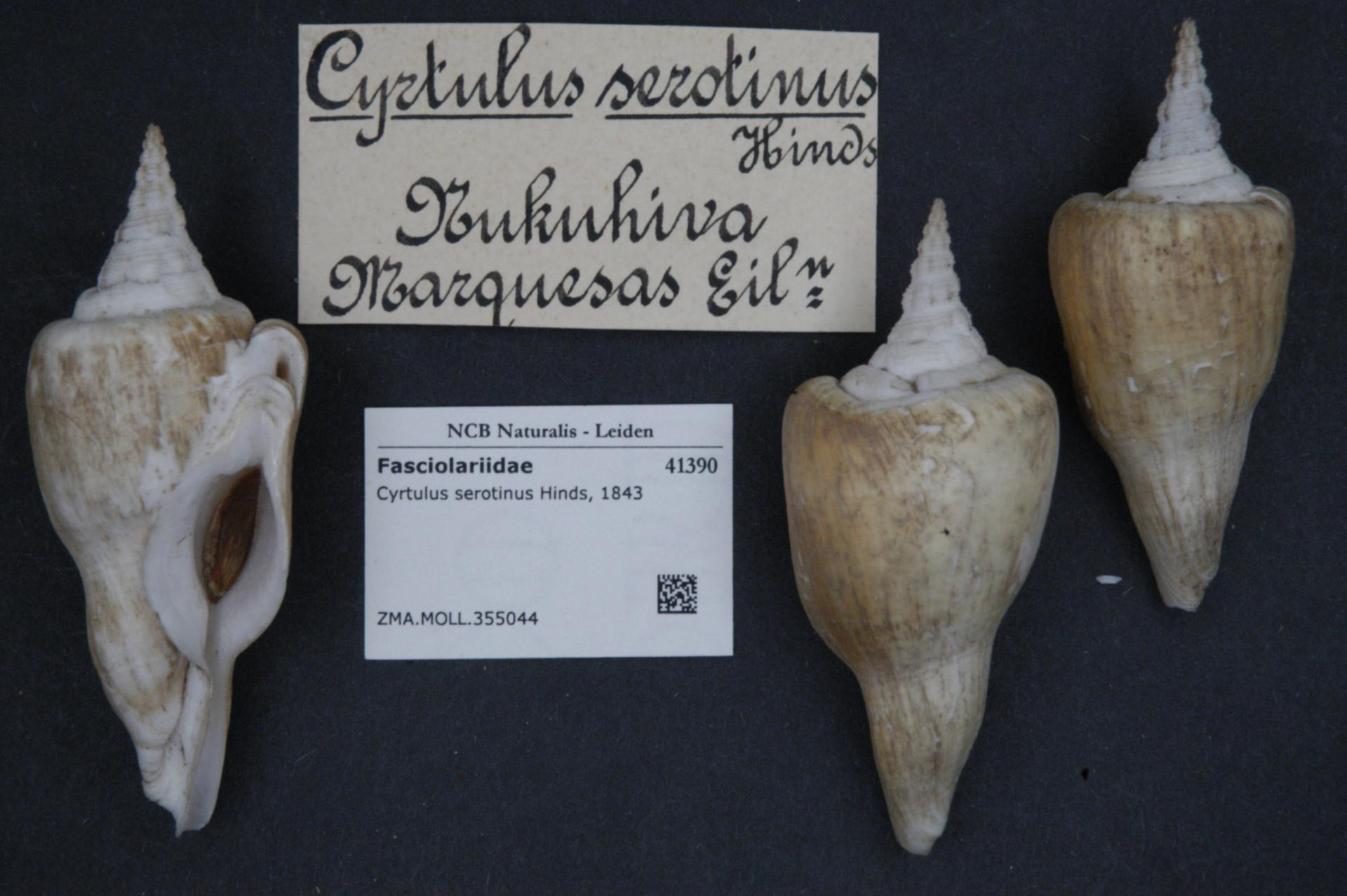
- Cyrtulus serotinus

Scientific classification
- Kingdom: Animalia
- Phylum: Mollusca
- Class: Gastropoda
- Subclass: Caenogastropoda
- Order: Neogastropoda
- Superfamily: Buccinoidea
- Family: Fasciolariidae
- Genus: Cyrtulus; Hinds, 1843

Type species
- Cyrtulus serotinus Hinds, 1843

= Cyrtulus =

Genus of gastropods

Cyrtulus is a genus of sea snails, marine gastropod mollusks in the family Fasciolariidae, the spindle snails, the tulip snails and their allies.

== Species ==
Species within the genus Cyrtulus include:

- Cyrtulus bountyi (Rehder & B. R. Wilson, 1975)
- Cyrtulus galatheae (Powell, 1967)
- Cyrtulus genticus (Iredale, 1936)
- Cyrtulus kilburni (Hadorn, 1999)
- Cyrtulus mauiensis (Callomon & Snyder, 2006)
- Cyrtulus serotinus Hinds, 1843
- Cyrtulus similis (Baird, 1873)
- Cyrtulus undatus (Gmelin, 1791)
