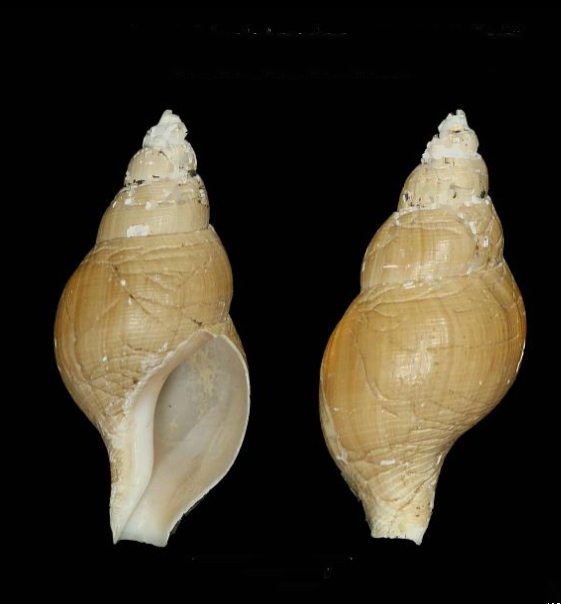
- Shell of Latisipho morditus (holotype at the Smithsonian Institution)

Scientific classification
- Kingdom: Animalia
- Phylum: Mollusca
- Class: Gastropoda
- Subclass: Caenogastropoda
- Order: Neogastropoda
- Superfamily: Buccinoidea
- Family: Buccinidae
- Genus: Latisipho
- Species: L. morditus

Binomial name
- Latisipho morditus (Dall, 1919)

Synonyms
- Aulacofusus morditus Dall, 1919; Aulacofusus (Limatofusus) morditus Dall, 1919 (original combination)

= Latisipho morditus =

Species of gastropod

Latisipho morditus is a species of sea snail, a marine gastropod mollusk in the family Buccinidae, the true whelks.

== Description ==
(Original description as Aulacofusus (Limatofusus) morditus) The small, solid shell is polished and measures 28 mm. It contains about seven whorls. The protoconch is decorticated and rather acute. The whorls are moderately rounded. The suture is distinct and not appressed. The axial sculpture consists of feeble incremental lines. Their intersections slightly punctuate the grooves. The spiral sculpture consists of numerous shallow grooves with much wider flattish interspaces over the whole surface. The outer lip is thin, sharp and arcuate. The pinkish inner lip is erased. The columella is white and attenuated in front. The siphonal canal is wide, distinct, short and slightly recurved.

== Distribution ==
This marine species occurs in the Strait of Georgia.
