= Latisipho pharcidus =

Scientific classification
- Kingdom: Animalia
- Phylum: Mollusca
- Class: Gastropoda
- Subclass: Caenogastropoda
- Order: Neogastropoda
- Family: Buccinidae
- Genus: Latisipho
- Species: L. pharcidus

Binomial name
- Latisipho pharcidus (Dall, 1919)

Synonyms
- Colus (Latifusus) pharcidus Dall, 1919 (basionym)

Species of gastropod

Latisipho pharcidus is a species of sea snail, a marine gastropod mollusk in the family Buccinidae, the true whelks.

== Description ==
(Original description) The shell is of moderate size with a length of 30 mm. Its color is white under an olivaceous periostracum, with. The shell contains six well-rounded whorls exclusive of the (lost) protoconch. The deep suture is distinct.The axial sculpture consists of faint incremental lines. The spiral sculpture consists of a very few hardly visible lines in front of the suture on the upper whorls and near the siphonal canal. Beside these there are irregular divergent raised lines on the periphery, such as have been noted in a number of species but which are doubtfully normal. The aperture is semilunate and 15 mm wide. The outer lip is thin, sharp, slightly arcuate. The inner lip is erased. The columella is short, twisted, attenuate in front and with a pervious axis. The siphonal canal is wide, short and strongly recurved.

== Distribution ==
This species occurs in the Okhotsk Sea.
