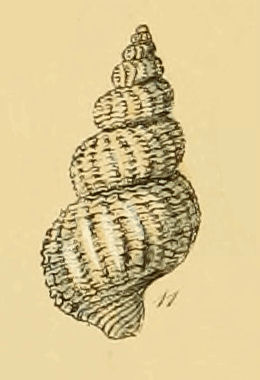
- Abapertural view of the shell of Turrisipho fenestratus

Scientific classification
- Kingdom: Animalia
- Phylum: Mollusca
- Class: Gastropoda
- Subclass: Caenogastropoda
- Order: Neogastropoda
- Superfamily: Buccinoidea
- Family: Colidae
- Genus: Turrisipho; Dautzenberg & H. Fischer, 1912

Type species
- Fusus (Siphonorbis) lachesis Mörch, 1869

Synonyms
- Colicryptus Iredale, 1918; Sipho (Turrisipho) Dautzenberg & H. Fischer, 1912 (original rank)

= Turrisipho =

Genus of gastropods

Turrisipho is a genus of sea snails, marine gastropod mollusks in the family Colidae,.

== Species ==
Species within the genus Turrisipho include:

- Turrisipho dalli (Friele in Tryon, 1881)
- Turrisipho fenestratus (Turton, 1834)
- Turrisipho lachesis (Mørch, 1869)
- Turrisipho moebii (Dunker & Metzger, 1874)
- Turrisipho voeringi Bouchet & Warén, 1985

Synonyms

- Turrisipho undulatus (Friele in Tryon, 1881): synonym of Turrisipho lachesis (Mörch, 1869)
