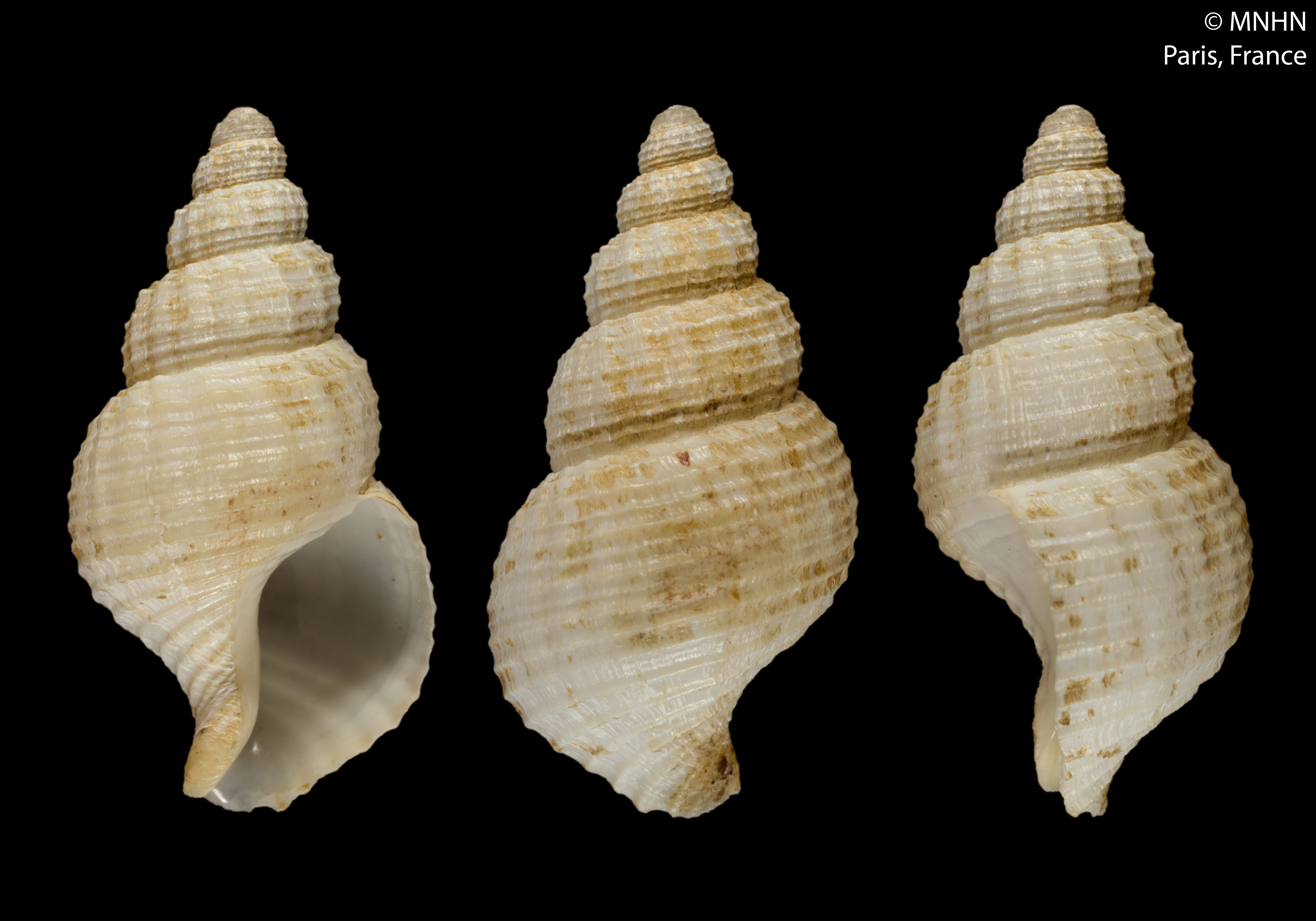
- Shell of Turrisipho fenestratus (syntype at MNHN, Paris)

Scientific classification
- Kingdom: Animalia
- Phylum: Mollusca
- Class: Gastropoda
- Subclass: Caenogastropoda
- Order: Neogastropoda
- Superfamily: Buccinoidea
- Family: Colidae
- Genus: Turrisipho
- Species: T. fenestratus

Binomial name
- Turrisipho fenestratus (Turton, 1834)

Synonyms
- Buccinum fusiforme Broderip, 1830(invalid: junior homonym of Buccinum fusiforme Borson, 1822); Colus fusiformis (Broderip, 1830); Fusus fenestratus W. Turton, 1834 (original combination); Neptunia ecaudis Locard, 1897; Neptunia fusiformis (Broderip, 1830); Neptunia fusiformis var. gracilis Locard, 1897; Neptunia fusiformis var. minor Locard, 1897 ·; Neptunia peregra Locard, 1897

= Turrisipho fenestratus =

Species of gastropod

Turrisipho fenestratus is a species of sea snail, a marine gastropod mollusk in the family Colidae, the true whelks and the like.

== Description ==
The length of the shell attains 69 mm (2.7 in).

(Original description) The white shell is oblong-fusiform. It bears numerous longitudinal ribs that are reticulated by transverse striae. It has eight swollen whorls. The siphonal canal is produced and turns slightly to the left. The aperture is white and smooth, while the tip is papillary.

== Distribution ==
This marine species occurs in the North Atlantic off Iceland, Northern Norway, Greenland and New Foundland.
