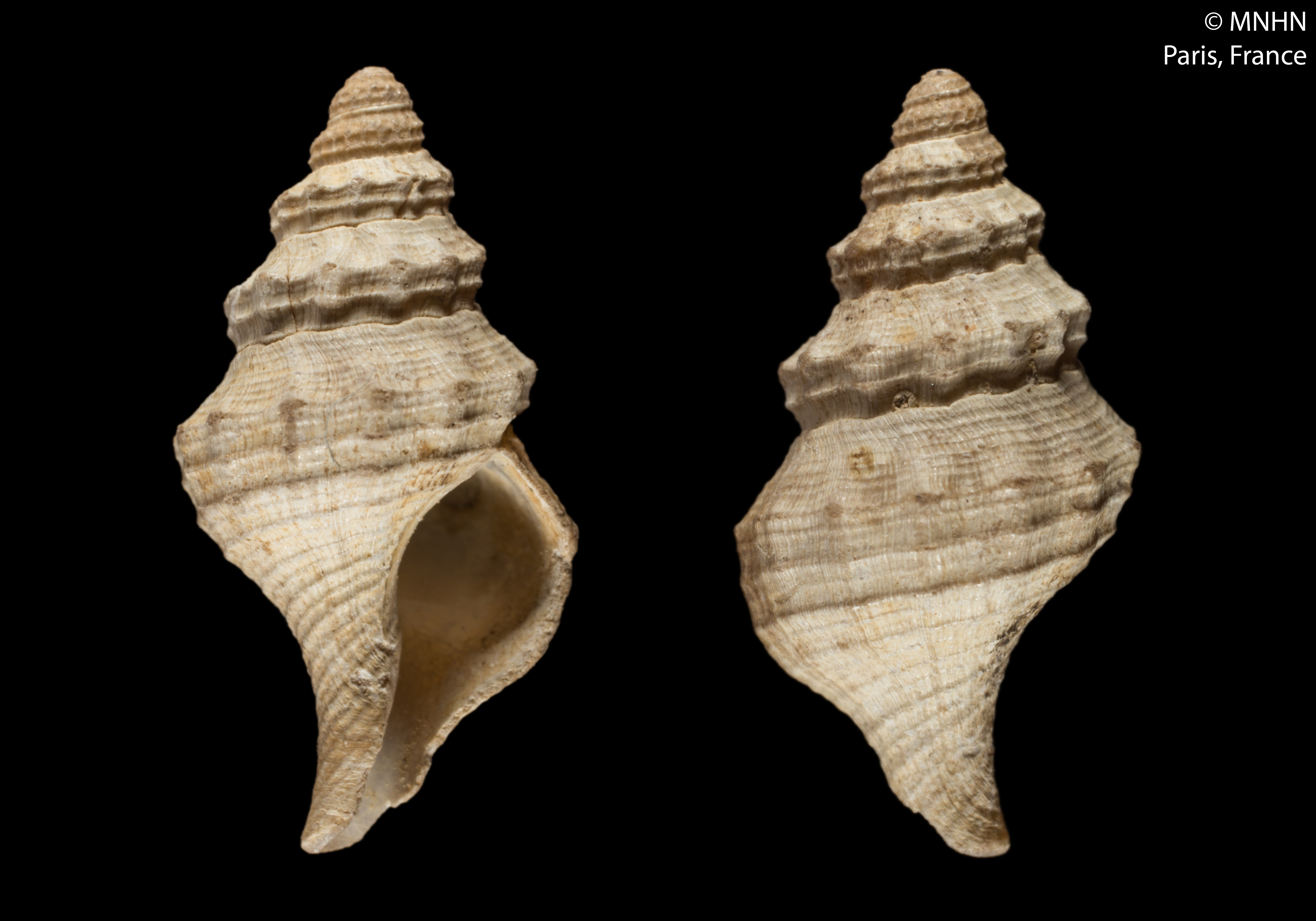
- Shell of Kryptos koehleri

Scientific classification
- Kingdom: Animalia
- Phylum: Mollusca
- Class: Gastropoda
- Subclass: Caenogastropoda
- Order: Neogastropoda
- Family: Colidae
- Genus: Kryptos; Dautzenberg & H. Fischer, 1896

Type species
- Kryptos elegans Dautzenberg & H. Fischer, 1896

= Kryptos (gastropod) =

Genus of gastropods

Kryptos is a genus of large sea snails, whelks, a marine gastropod molluscs in the family Colidae, the true whelks and the like.

== Species ==
- Kryptos koehleri (Locard, 1896)
- Kryptos tholoides (Watson, 1882)

Species brought into synonymy

- Kryptos elegans Dautzenberg & H. Fischer, 1896: synonym of Kryptos koehleri (Locard, 1896)
- Kryptos explorator Fraussen & Sellanes, 2008: synonym of Jerrybuccinum explorator (Fraussen & Sellanes, 2008)
