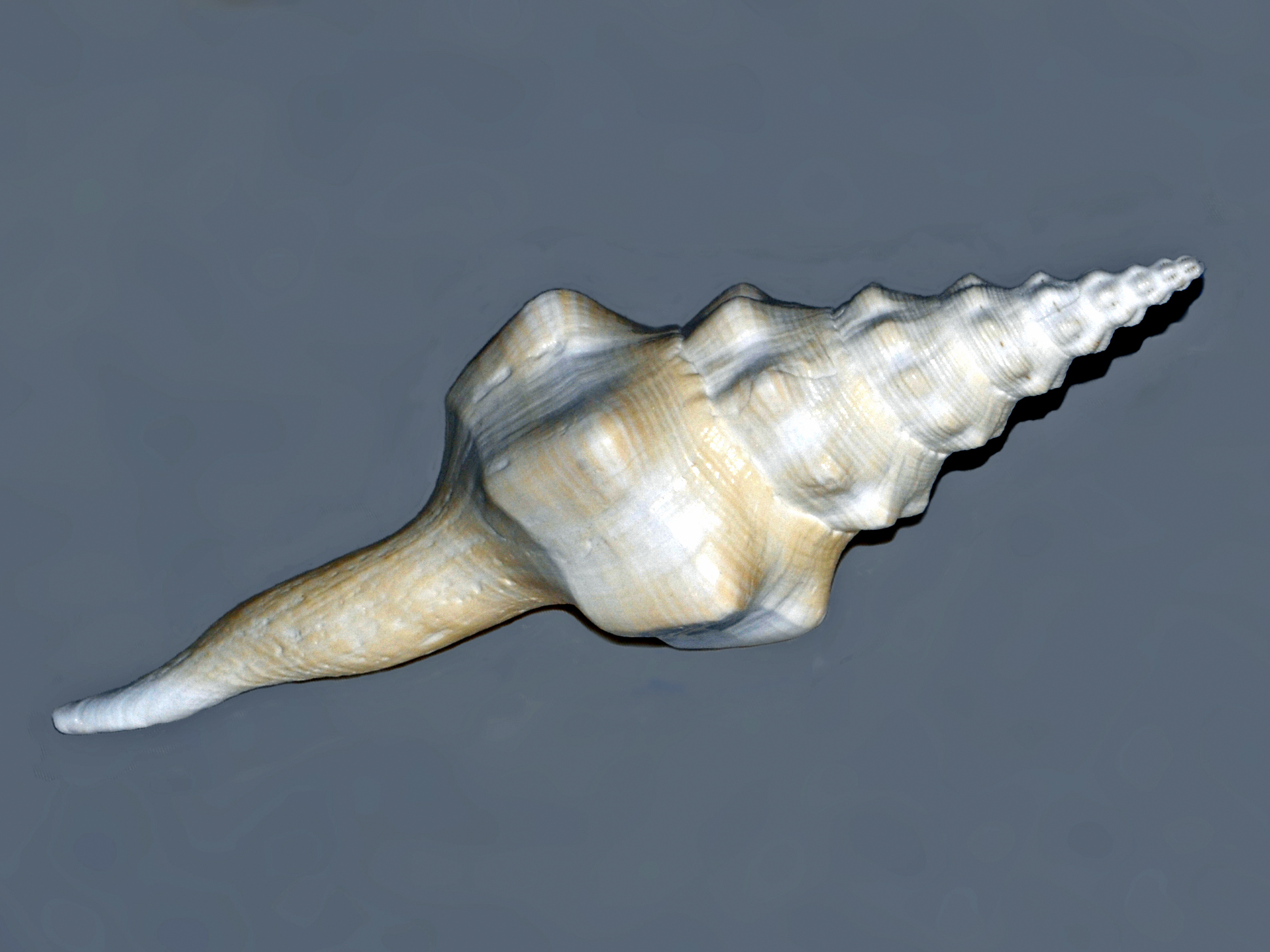
- Cyrtulus undatus from Philippines

Scientific classification
- Kingdom: Animalia
- Phylum: Mollusca
- Class: Gastropoda
- Subclass: Caenogastropoda
- Order: Neogastropoda
- Family: Fasciolariidae
- Genus: Cyrtulus
- Species: C. undatus

Binomial name
- Cyrtulus undatus (Gmelin, 1791)

Synonyms
- Fusinus undatus (Gmelin, 1791); Fusus incrassatus Lamarck, 1816; Murex undatus Gmelin, 1791

= Cyrtulus undatus =

Species of gastropod

Cyrtulus undatus, common name Legrand's wavy spindle, is a species of sea snail, a marine gastropod mollusk in the family Fasciolariidae, the spindle snails, the tulip snails and their allies.

== Description ==
Fusinus undatus has a shell that reaches a size of 60 – 253 mm.

== Distribution ==
This species occurs in the Indo-Western Pacific.
