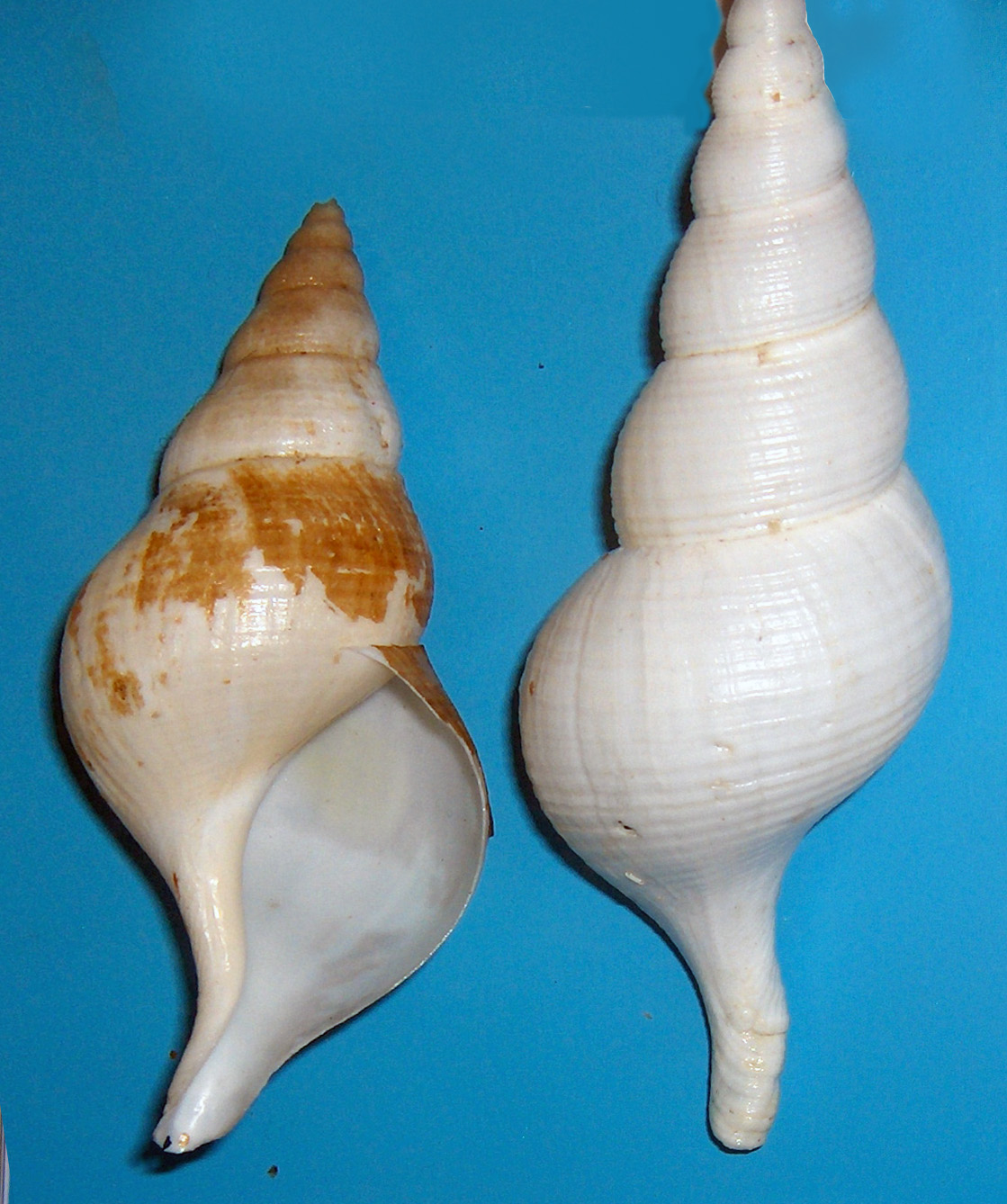

Scientific classification
- Kingdom: Animalia
- Phylum: Mollusca
- Class: Gastropoda
- Subclass: Caenogastropoda
- Order: Neogastropoda
- Family: Colidae
- Genus: Colus
- Species: C. islandicus

Binomial name
- Colus islandicus (Mohr, 1786)

Synonyms
- Euthria obesa (G. B. Sowerby II, 1880) (dubious synonym); Fusus islandicus (Mohr, 1786); Fusus islandicus Chemnitz, 1780 (unavailable name: published in a work rejected by ICZN direction 1); Fusus obesus G. B. Sowerby II, 1880; Murex islandicus Mohr, 1786 (original combination); Neptunia islandica (Mohr, 1786); Neptunia islandica var. gallica Locard, 1896; Tritonium (Fusus) islandicum (Mohr, 1786) superseded combination; Tritonium (Fusus) islandicum var. sulcata Middendorff, 1849; Tritonium islandicum (Mohr, 1786)

= Colus islandicus =

Species of gastropod

Colus islandicus is a species of sea snail, a marine gastropod mollusk in the family Colidae, the true whelks and the like.

== Subspecies ==
- Colus islandicus islandicus (Mohr, 1786)
- Colus islandicus subangulosus Paulmier, 2020

== Description ==
The length of the shell attains 135 mm.

== Distribution ==
Distribution range of this marine species: 77°N to 36.8°N; 92°W to 0°W.

Distribution:

- Greenland; Greenland: West Greenland, East Greenland;
- Canada; Canada: Baffin Island, Gulf of St. Lawrence, Quebec;
- USA: Massachusetts, New York, Virginia
