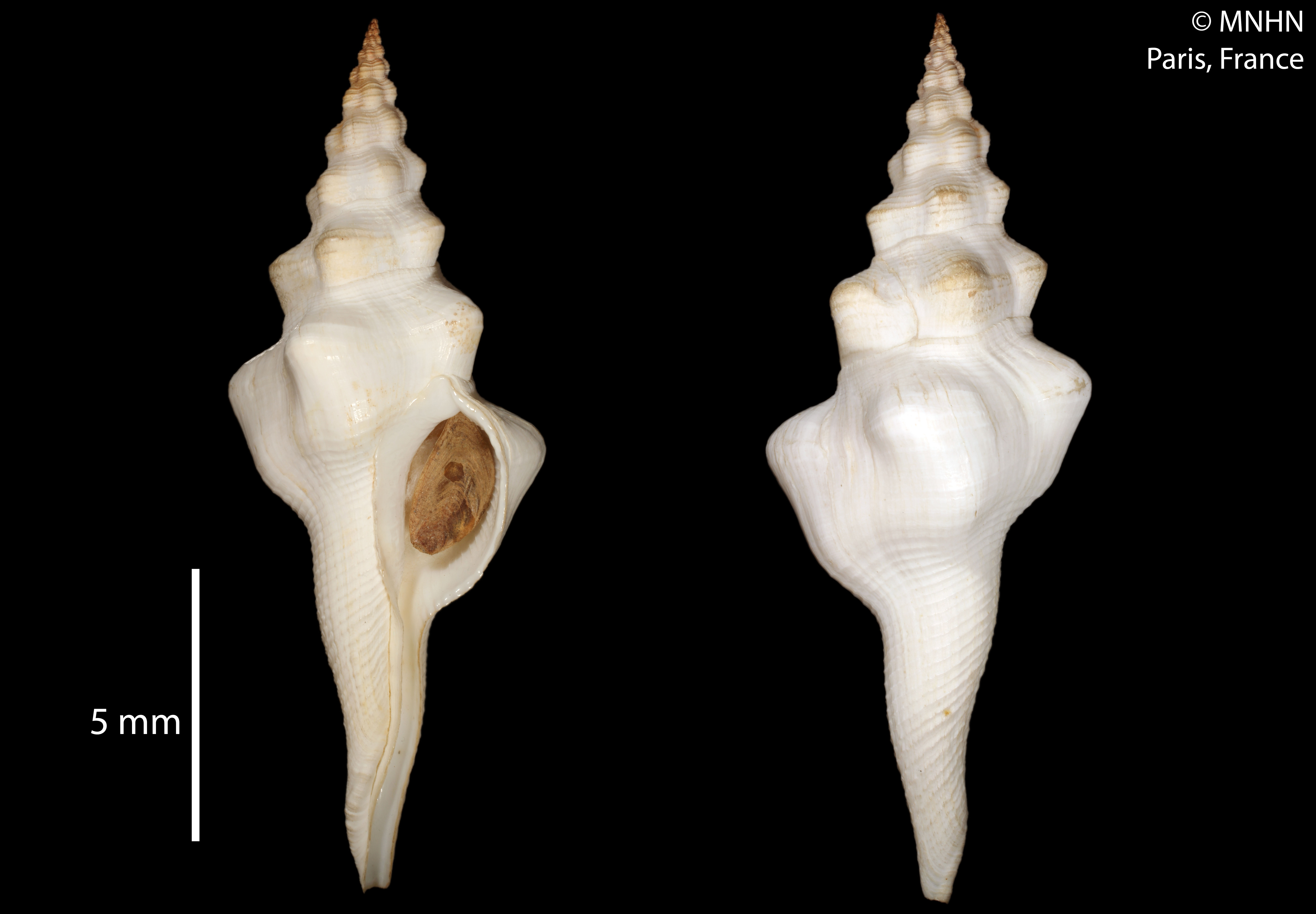
- Shell of Cyrtulus mauiensis (paratype at MNHN, Paris)

Scientific classification
- Kingdom: Animalia
- Phylum: Mollusca
- Class: Gastropoda
- Subclass: Caenogastropoda
- Order: Neogastropoda
- Family: Fasciolariidae
- Genus: Cyrtulus
- Species: C. mauiensis

Binomial name
- Cyrtulus mauiensis (Callomon & Snyder, 2006)

Synonyms
- Fusinus mauiensis Callomon & Snyder, 2006 (original combination)

= Cyrtulus mauiensis =

Species of gastropod

Cyrtulus mauiensis is a species of sea snail, a marine gastropod mollusk in the family Fasciolariidae, the spindle snails, the tulip snails and their allies.

== Distribution ==
This marine species occurs off Hawaii.
