= Anomalisipho altus =

Scientific classification
- Kingdom: Animalia
- Phylum: Mollusca
- Class: Gastropoda
- Subclass: Caenogastropoda
- Order: Neogastropoda
- Family: Buccinidae
- Genus: Anomalisipho
- Species: A. altus

Binomial name
- Anomalisipho altus (S.V Wood, 1848)

Synonyms
- Colus altus (S. Wood, 1848)

Species of gastropod

Anomalisipho altus is a species of sea snail, a marine gastropod mollusk in the family Buccinidae, the true whelks.

== Description ==
They are 40 - 70 mm long.

== Distribution ==
They are native to the Norwegian Barents Sea.
