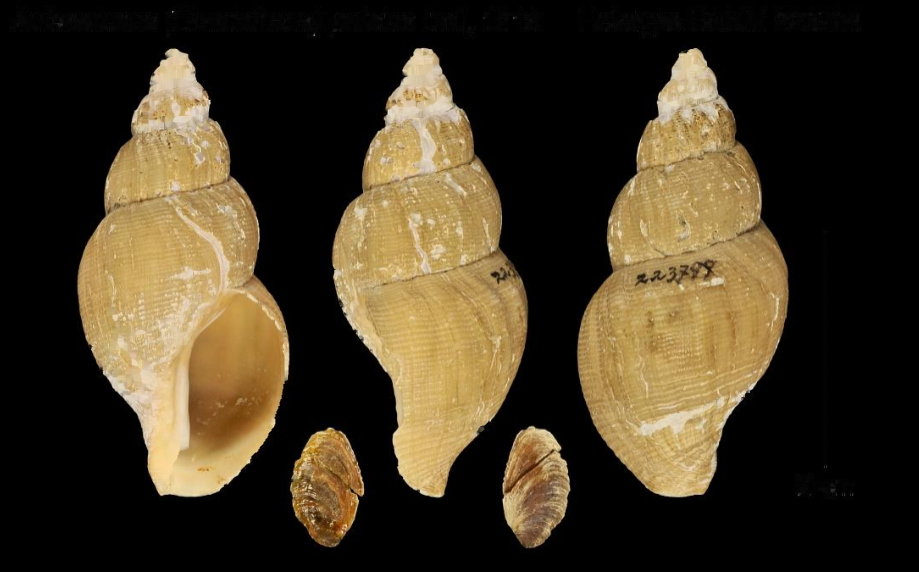
- Shell of Colus pulcius (holotype at the Smithsonian Institution)

Scientific classification
- Kingdom: Animalia
- Phylum: Mollusca
- Class: Gastropoda
- Subclass: Caenogastropoda
- Order: Neogastropoda
- Superfamily: Buccinoidea
- Family: Colidae
- Genus: Colus
- Species: C. pulcius

Binomial name
- Colus pulcius Dall, 1919

Synonyms
- Aulacofusus capponius (Dall, 1919); Aulacofusus pulcius Dall, 1919 (original combination); Aulacofusus (Limatofusus) pulcius (Dall, 1919); Colus capponius Dall, 1919; Colus (Aulacofusus) capponius (Dall, 1919); Fusus (Sipho) turritus Aurivillius, 1885; Fusus turritus Aurivillius, 1885 (Invalid: junior secondary homonym of Sipho turritus Schafhäutl, 1863); Helicofusus pulcius (Dall, 1919)

= Colus pulcius =

Species of gastropod

Colus pulcius is a species of sea snail, a marine gastropod mollusk in the family Colidae, the true whelks and the like.

== Description ==
(Original description as Colus (Aulacofusus) capponius ) The shell is of moderate size and its height measures 40 mm. The spire is longer than the aperture. The shell is white, with a thin polished, oUvaceous periostracum. The shell contains more than five whorls (the protoconch defective). The whorls are moderately rounded. The suture is distinct and deep. The axial sculpture consists of fine silky incremental striae, sometimes with a tendency to cause wrinkles near the suture. The spiral sculpture consists of (on the penultimate whorl about 17) regular narrow rather deep grooves with much wider flattish interspaces, uniformly covering the whole surface of the shell. The aperture is about twice as long as wide. The outer lip is retroactively arcuate behind and protractively anteriorly, not reflected. The inner lip shows a thin glaze. The columella is white. The siphonal canal is short, wide and hardly reflected.

== Distribution ==
This marine species occurs in the Bering Strait.
