= Cyrtulus kilburni =

Scientific classification
- Kingdom: Animalia
- Phylum: Mollusca
- Class: Gastropoda
- Subclass: Caenogastropoda
- Order: Neogastropoda
- Family: Fasciolariidae
- Genus: Cyrtulus
- Species: C. kilburni

Binomial name
- Cyrtulus kilburni (Hadorn, 1999)

Synonyms
- Fusinus kilburni Hadorn, 1999 (original combination)

Species of gastropod

Cyrtulus kilburni is a species of sea snail, a marine gastropod mollusk in the family Fasciolariidae, the spindle snails, the tulip snails and their allies.

== Description ==
The species' shells measure 35–95 millimeters in length.

== Distribution ==
This marine species occurs off Durban, South Africa.
