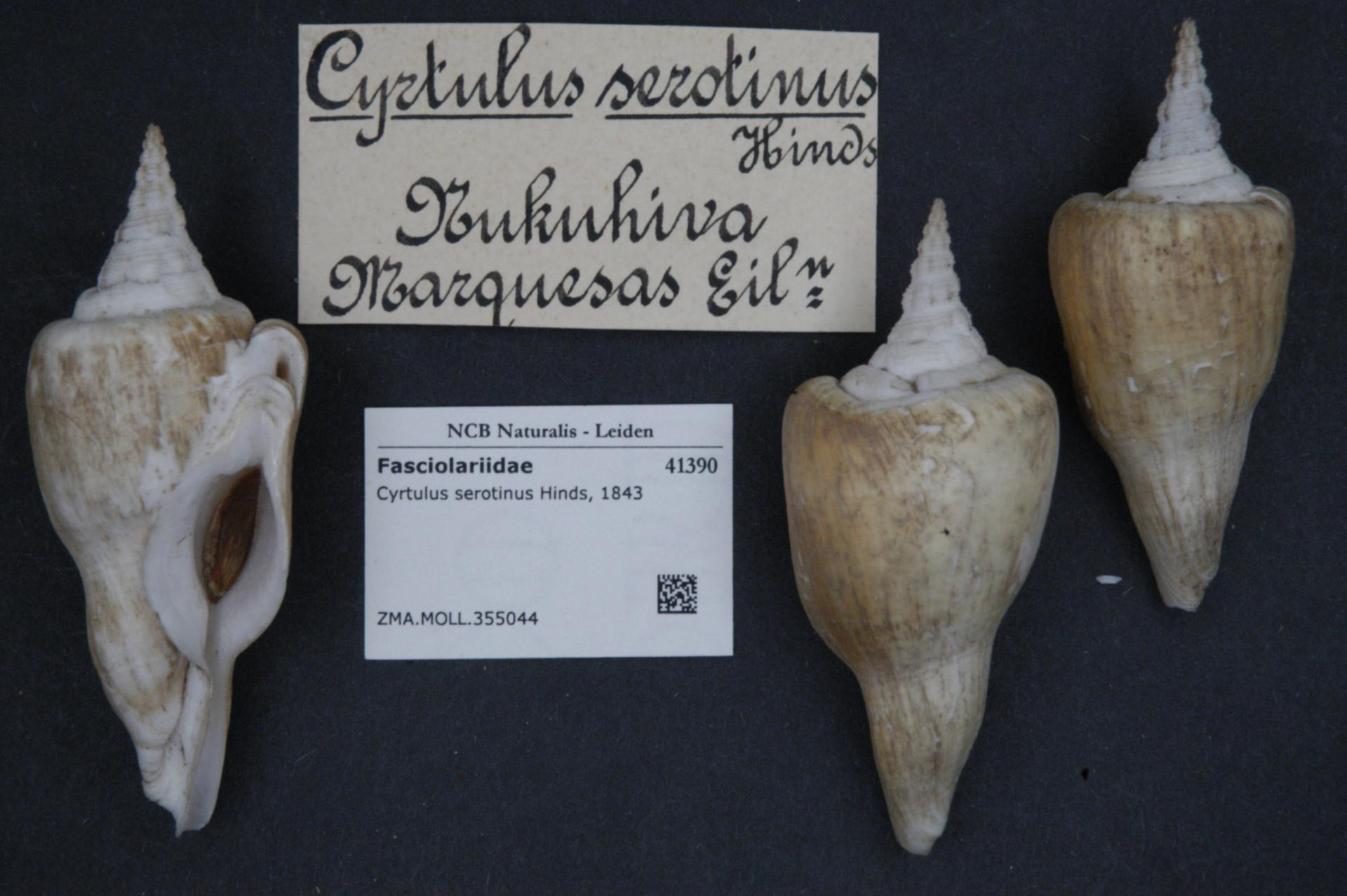

Scientific classification
- Kingdom: Animalia
- Phylum: Mollusca
- Class: Gastropoda
- Subclass: Caenogastropoda
- Order: Neogastropoda
- Family: Fasciolariidae
- Genus: Cyrtulus
- Species: C. serotinus

Binomial name
- Cyrtulus serotinus Hinds, 1843

= Cyrtulus serotinus =

Species of gastropod

Cyrtulus serotinus is a species of sea snail, a marine gastropod mollusk in the family Fasciolariidae, the spindle snails, the tulip snails and their allies.

== Description ==
Shell size 78 mm.

== Distribution ==
Endemic to the Marquesas Archipelago.
