= Anomalisipho =

Scientific classification
- Kingdom: Animalia
- Phylum: Mollusca
- Class: Gastropoda
- Subclass: Caenogastropoda
- Order: Neogastropoda
- Family: Buccinidae
- Genus: Anomalisipho; Dautzenberg & H. Fischer, 1912

Type species
- Sipho verkruezeni Kobelt, 1876

Genus of gastropods

Anomalisipho is a genus of sea snails, marine gastropod mollusks in the family Buccinidae, the true whelks.

== Species ==
According to the World Register of Marine Species (WoRMS), the following species with valid names are included within the genus Anomalosipho :

- Anomalisipho altus (S. Wood, 1848)
- Anomalisipho conulus (Aurivillius, 1885)
- Anomalisipho verkruezeni (Kobelt, 1876)
- Anomalisipho virgata (Friele, 1879)
