= Cyrtulus galatheae =

Scientific classification
- Kingdom: Animalia
- Phylum: Mollusca
- Class: Gastropoda
- Subclass: Caenogastropoda
- Order: Neogastropoda
- Family: Fasciolariidae
- Genus: Cyrtulus
- Species: C. galatheae

Binomial name
- Cyrtulus galatheae (Powell, 1967)

Synonyms
- Fusinus galatheae Powell, 1967 (original combination)

Species of gastropod

Cyrtulus galatheae is a species of sea snail, a marine gastropod mollusk in the family Fasciolariidae, the spindle snails, the tulip snails and their allies.
