= Anomalisipho verkruezeni =

Scientific classification
- Kingdom: Animalia
- Phylum: Mollusca
- Class: Gastropoda
- Subclass: Caenogastropoda
- Order: Neogastropoda
- Family: Buccinidae
- Genus: Anomalisipho
- Species: A. verkruezeni

Binomial name
- Anomalisipho verkruezeni (Kobelt, 1876)

Synonyms
- Anomalisipho dautzenbergii Dall, 1916; Anomalisipho frielei Kantor, 1981; Anomalisipho virgata (Friele, 1879); Buccinum brucei Melvill & Standen, 1909; Colus frielei (Kantor, 1981); Colus verkruezeni (Kobelt, 1876); Helicofusus paraelatior Kantor, 1981; Neptunea virgata Friele, 1879; Sipho verkruezeni Kobelt, 1876

Species of gastropod

Anomalisipho verkruezeni is a species of sea snail, a marine gastropod mollusk in the family Buccinidae, the true whelks.
