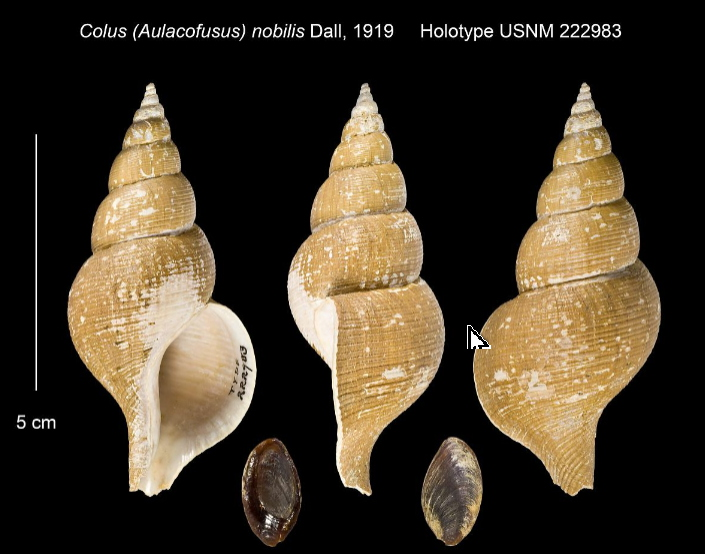
- Shell of Aulacofusus herendeeni (holotype at the Smithsonian Institution)

Scientific classification
- Kingdom: Animalia
- Phylum: Mollusca
- Class: Gastropoda
- Subclass: Caenogastropoda
- Order: Neogastropoda
- Superfamily: Buccinoidea
- Family: Buccinidae
- Genus: Aulacofusus
- Species: A. herendeeni

Binomial name
- Aulacofusus herendeeni (Dall, 1902)

Synonyms
- Aulacofusus nobilis (Dall, 1919) ed; Colus (Aulacofusus) nobilis Dall, 1919; Colus herendeenii (Dall, 1902); Colus nobilis Dall, 1919; Tritonofusus (Plicifusus) herendeeni Dall, 1902

= Aulacofusus herendeeni =

Species of gastropod

Aulacofusus herendeeni is a species of sea snail, a marine gastropod mollusc in the family Buccinidae, the true whelks.

== Description ==
(Original description as Colus (Aulacofusus) nobilis) The large shell has a length of 85 mm. It is regular, acute, whitish, with a warm yellow-brown persistent periostracum. The shell contains eight whorls, exclusive of the very minute (lost) protoconch. They are separated by a very sharply defined suture and are elegantly rounded. The spiral sculpture consists of (on the penultimate whorl about 15) flattened revolving close-set cords either in pairs or medially grooved for the most part, practically uniform over the whole shell. The axial sculpture consists only of fine silky incremental lines. The aperture is rather wide with 43 mm. The thin outer lip is expanded, more or less crenulated internally by the effect of the external sculpture. The body and the columella are covered with a thick, continuous coat of enamel. The short siphonal canal is distinct and slightly recurved. The blackish operculum is solidand has an apical nucleus.

== Distribution ==
Tjhis species occurs in the Bering Sea and off the Aleutian Islands.
