= Mohnia danielsseni =

Scientific classification
- Kingdom: Animalia
- Phylum: Mollusca
- Class: Gastropoda
- Subclass: Caenogastropoda
- Order: Neogastropoda
- Family: Buccinidae
- Genus: Mohnia
- Species: M. danielsseni

Binomial name
- Mohnia danielsseni (Friele, 1879)

Species of gastropod

Mohnia danielsseni is a species of sea snail, a marine gastropod mollusk in the family Buccinidae, the true whelks.
