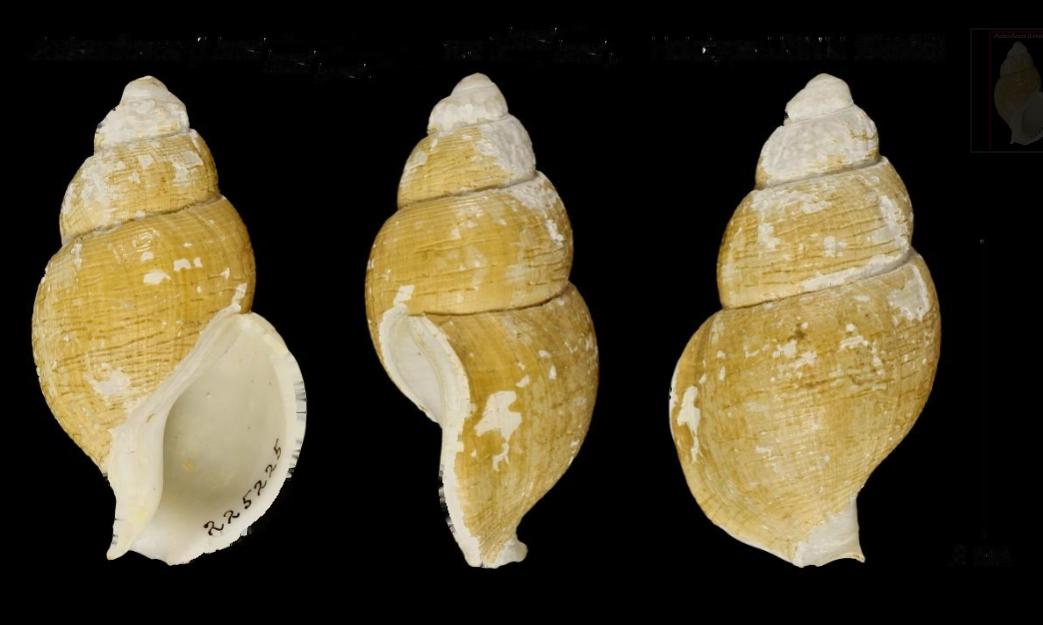
- Shell of Latisipho severinus (holotype at the Smithsonian Institution)

Scientific classification
- Kingdom: Animalia
- Phylum: Mollusca
- Class: Gastropoda
- Subclass: Caenogastropoda
- Order: Neogastropoda
- Superfamily: Buccinoidea
- Family: Buccinidae
- Genus: Latisipho
- Species: L. severinus

Binomial name
- Latisipho severinus (Dall, 1919)

Synonyms
- Aulacofusus severinus Dall, 1919; Aulacofusus (Limatofusus) severinus Dall, 1919 (original combination); Colus severinus (Dall, 1919); Limatofusus severinus (Dall, 1919)

= Latisipho severinus =

Species of gastropod

Latisipho severinus is a species of sea snail, a marine gastropod mollusk in the family Buccinidae, the true whelks.

== Description ==
(Original description of Aulacofusus (Limatofusus) severinus) The small, white shell attains a length of 33 mm. It is covered with a straw-colored periostracum. It contains about six rounded whorls. The protoconch is eroded. The suture is distinct and not appressed. The axial sculpture consists of obscure incremental striae. The spiral sculpture consists of slightly irregular flattish ribs separated by narrower channeled grooves. On the penultimate whorl there are 15 to 17 of these ribs. Beside these the surface is profusely scored with incised, more or less oblique, sometimes divaricate grooves, which the author takes to be abnormal. The aperture is wide and measures 17 mm. The outer lip is convexly arcuate, slightly expanded and thickened. The inner lip has a layer of white enamel. The columella is short. The siphonal canal is very short, wide, deep and recurved. The dark brown operculum is normal.

== Distribution ==
This marine species occurs in the Bay of Monterey, California.
