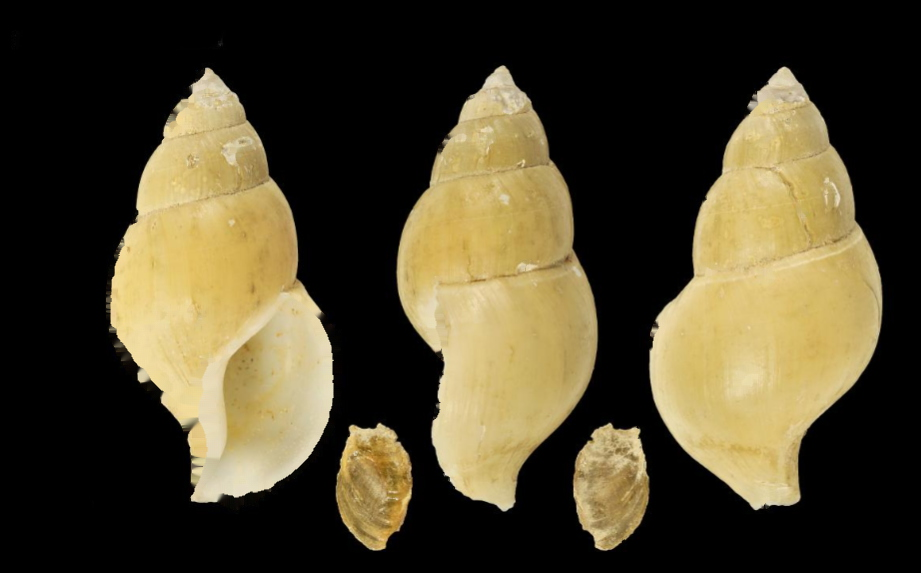
- Shell of Latisipho aphelus (holotype at the Smithsonian Institution)

Scientific classification
- Kingdom: Animalia
- Phylum: Mollusca
- Class: Gastropoda
- Subclass: Caenogastropoda
- Order: Neogastropoda
- Superfamily: Buccinoidea
- Family: Buccinidae
- Genus: Latisipho
- Species: L. aphelus

Binomial name
- Latisipho aphelus (Dall, 1890)

Synonyms
- Chrysodomus aphelus Dall, 1890 (original combination); Colus aphelus (Dall, 1890)

= Latisipho aphelus =

Species of gastropod

Latisipho aphelus is a species of sea snail, a marine gastropod mollusk in the family Buccinidae, the true whelks.

== Description ==
(Description as Chrysodomus aphelus) The small shell has a bucciuiform shape and measures 30 mm. It contains six smooth whorls, covered with a greenish-gray epidermis The minute protoconch is eroded. The whorls are full and well rounded. The suture is distinct, not deep nor channeled. The sculpture consists only of taint incremental lines and a few obscure spiral traces. The aperture is moderate. The outer lip is thin and is very slightly reflected, flexuous. The body and the columella lips are white, polished and without callus. The columella is short, strong, curved, truncate anteriorly and well recurved. The siphonal canal is short, wide, well defined, and recurved. The white throat is smooth. The axis is not pervious. The operculum is normal.

== Distribution ==
This marine species was found off the coast of Santa Barbara, California.
