= Plicifusus kroyeri =

Scientific classification
- Kingdom: Animalia
- Phylum: Mollusca
- Class: Gastropoda
- Subclass: Caenogastropoda
- Order: Neogastropoda
- Superfamily: Buccinoidea
- Family: Buccinidae
- Genus: Plicifusus
- Species: P. kroyeri

Binomial name
- Plicifusus kroyeri (Möller, 1842)

Synonyms
- Buccinum cretaceum Reeve, 1847; Colus cretaceus (Reeve, 1847); Colus kroeyeri (Møller, 1842); Colus kroyeri (Møller, 1842) ·; Fusus arcticus Philippi, 1850; Fusus kroeyeri Møller, 1842 (basionym); Fusus kroeyeri var. grossestriata Aurivillius, 1885; Fusus kroeyeri var. major Mörch, 1869; Fusus kroeyeri var. pumila Mörch, 1869; Plicifusus arcticus (Philippi, 1850); Plicifusus obtustatus Golikov, in Golikov & Scarlato, 1985; Plicifusus polypleuratus (Dall, 1907); Sipho plicatus A. Adams, 1863; Tritonofusus polypleuratus Dall, 1907

Species of gastropod

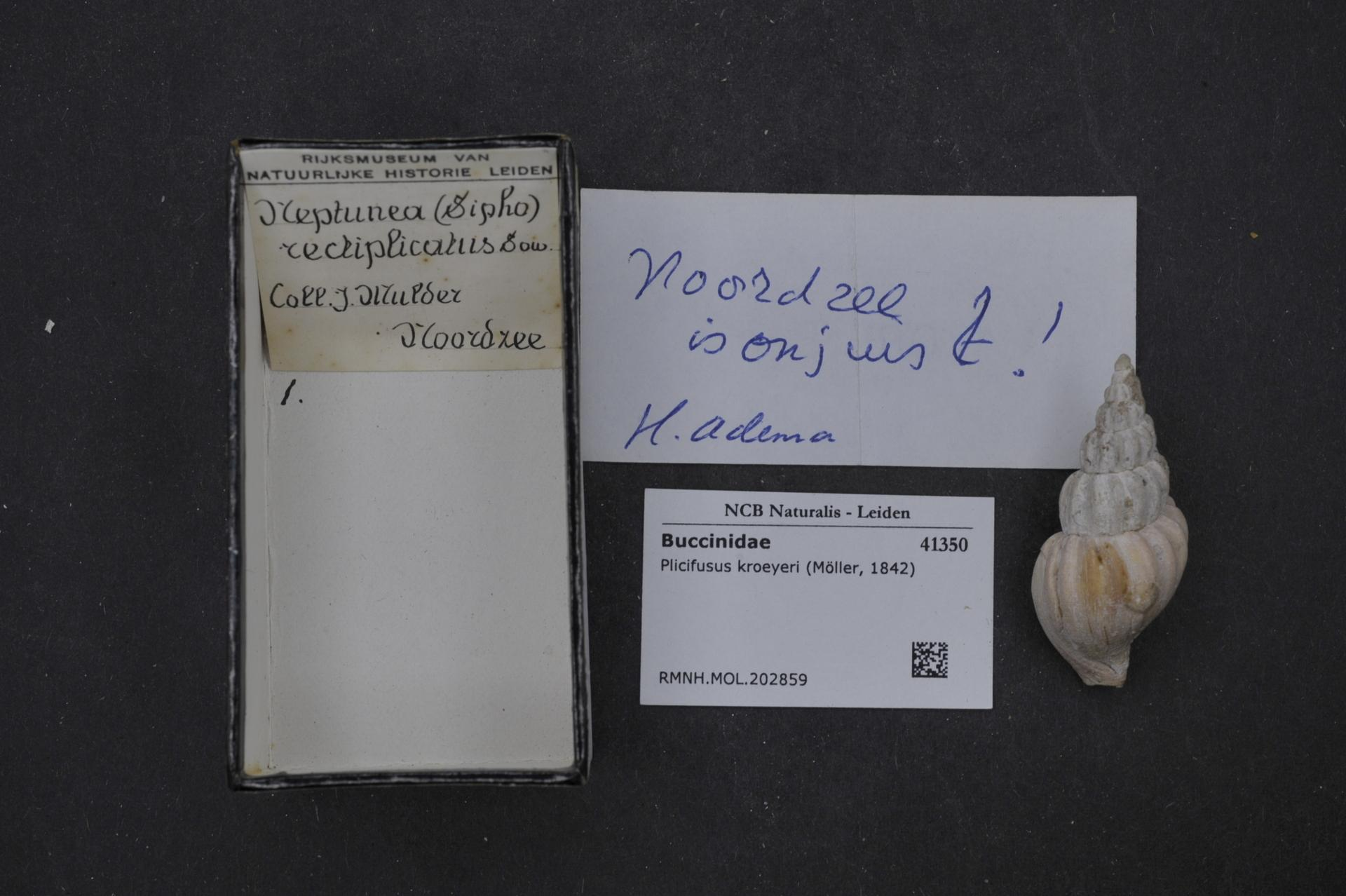
Plicifusus kroeyeri (Moeller, 1842)

Plicifusus kroyeri is a species of sea snail, a marine gastropod mollusk in the family Buccinidae, the true whelks.

== Distribution ==
Northern Pacific Ocean. Trawled at 300–350 m. depth, off Hokkaido, Japan.
