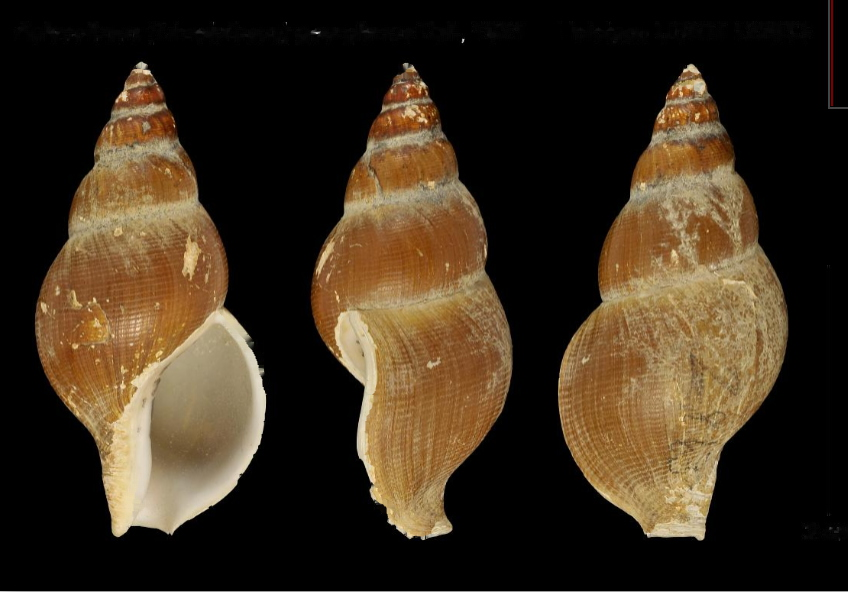
- Shell of Latisipho georgianus (holotype at the Smithsonian Institution)

Scientific classification
- Kingdom: Animalia
- Phylum: Mollusca
- Class: Gastropoda
- Subclass: Caenogastropoda
- Order: Neogastropoda
- Superfamily: Buccinoidea
- Family: Buccinidae
- Genus: Latisipho
- Species: L. georgianus

Binomial name
- Latisipho georgianus (Dall, 1921)

Synonyms
- Aulacofusus (Limatofusus) georgianus Dall, 1921; Colus georgianus (Dall, 1921) ·

= Latisipho georgianus =

Species of gastropod

Latisipho georgianus is a species of sea snail, a marine gastropod mollusk in the family Buccinidae, the true whelks.
