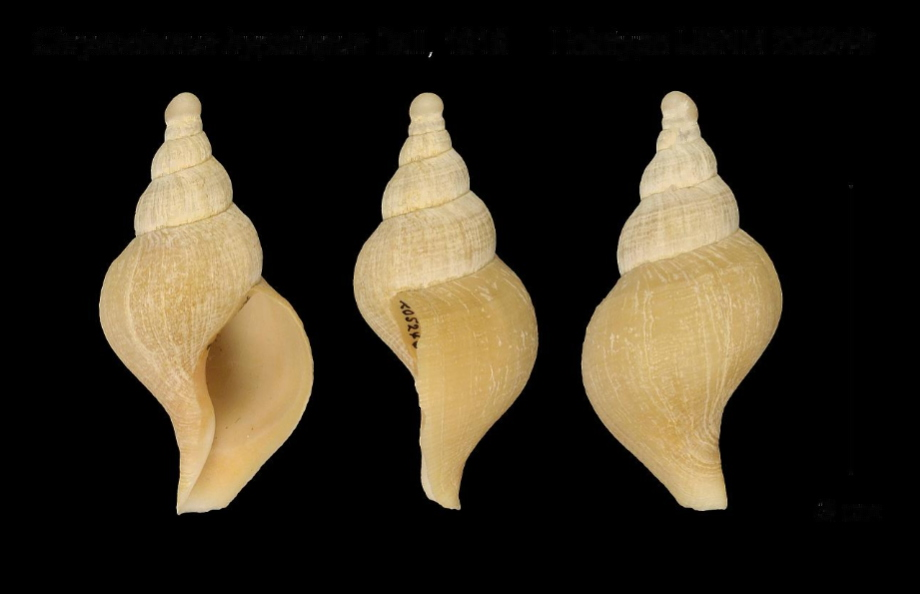
- Shell of Latisipho hypolispus (holotype at the Smithsonian Institution)

Scientific classification
- Kingdom: Animalia
- Phylum: Mollusca
- Class: Gastropoda
- Subclass: Caenogastropoda
- Order: Neogastropoda
- Family: Buccinidae
- Genus: Latisipho
- Species: L. hypolispus

Binomial name
- Latisipho hypolispus (Dall, 1891)

Synonyms
- Chrysodomus hypolispus Dall, 1891; Chrysodomus (Sipho) hypolispus Dall, 1891 (original combination); Colus hypolispus (Dall, 1891); Colus (Lattisipho) hypolispus (Dall, 1891); Colus (Latifusus) pharcidus Dall, 1919; Plicifusus (Latisipho) hypolispus Okutani, 2000

= Latisipho hypolispus =

Species of gastropod

Latisipho hypolispus is a species of sea snail, a marine gastropod mollusk in the family Buccinidae, the true whelks.

== Description ==
(Original description as Chrysodomus (Sipho) hypolispus) The length of the brown, polished shell attains 55 mm. It has well rounded six or seven whorls sculptured only by a few obsolete spirals and malleations. The axial sculpture consists of a few incremental lines. The suture is distinct and the spire is rather acute. The siphonal canal is very short and strongly recurved, axis almost pervious. The outer lip is sinuous, throat white. There is a well marked callus on the columella and body.

== Distribution ==
This species occurs in the Bering Sea, Okhotsk Sea and Chukchi Sea.
