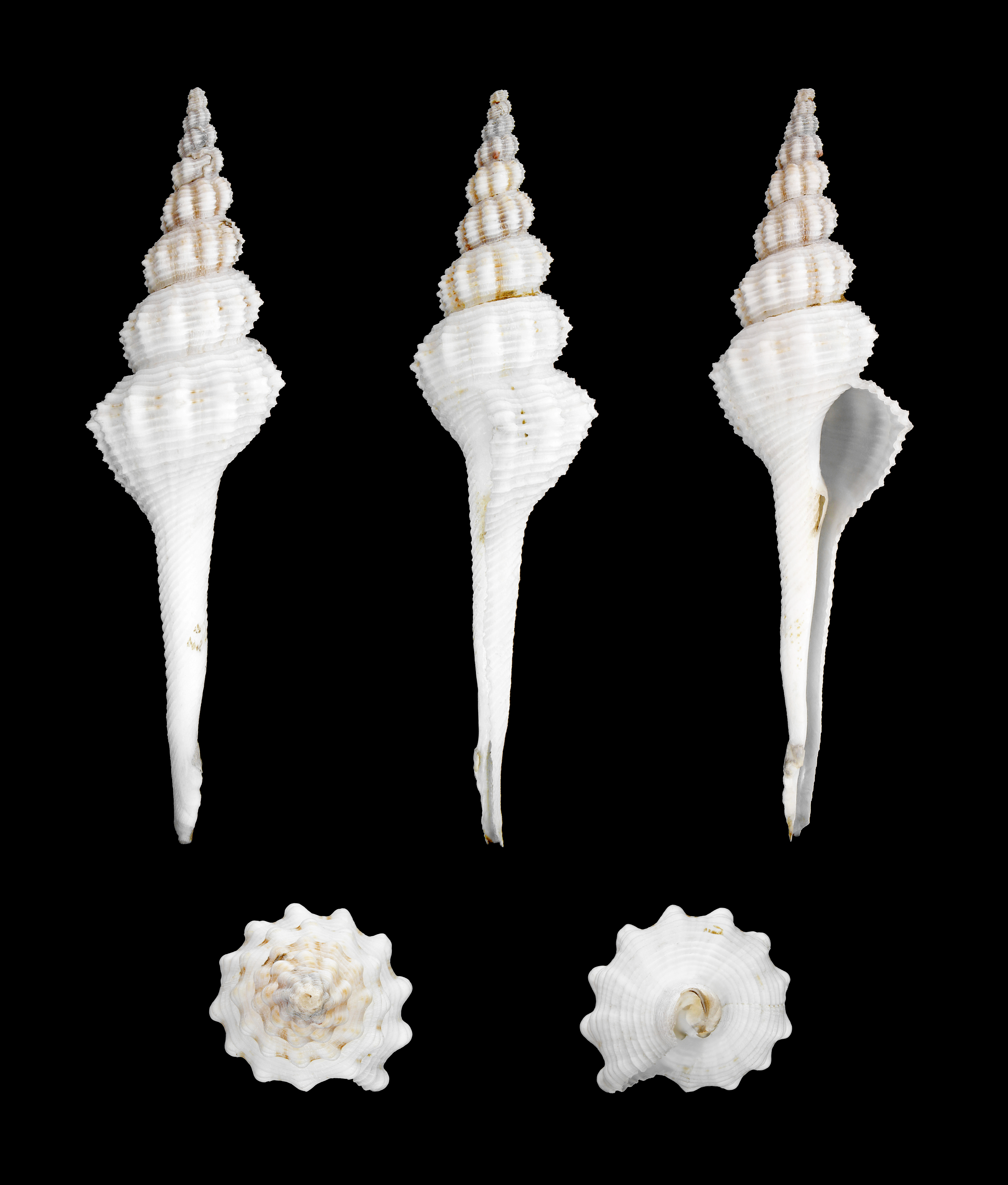

Scientific classification
- Kingdom: Animalia
- Phylum: Mollusca
- Class: Gastropoda
- Subclass: Caenogastropoda
- Order: Neogastropoda
- Family: Fasciolariidae
- Genus: Fusinus
- Species: F. forceps

Binomial name
- Fusinus forceps (Perry, 1811)

Synonyms
- Murex forceps Perry, 1811

= Fusinus forceps =

Species of gastropod

Fusinus forceps is a species of sea snail, a marine gastropod mollusk in the family Fasciolariidae, the spindle snails, the tulip snails and their allies.
