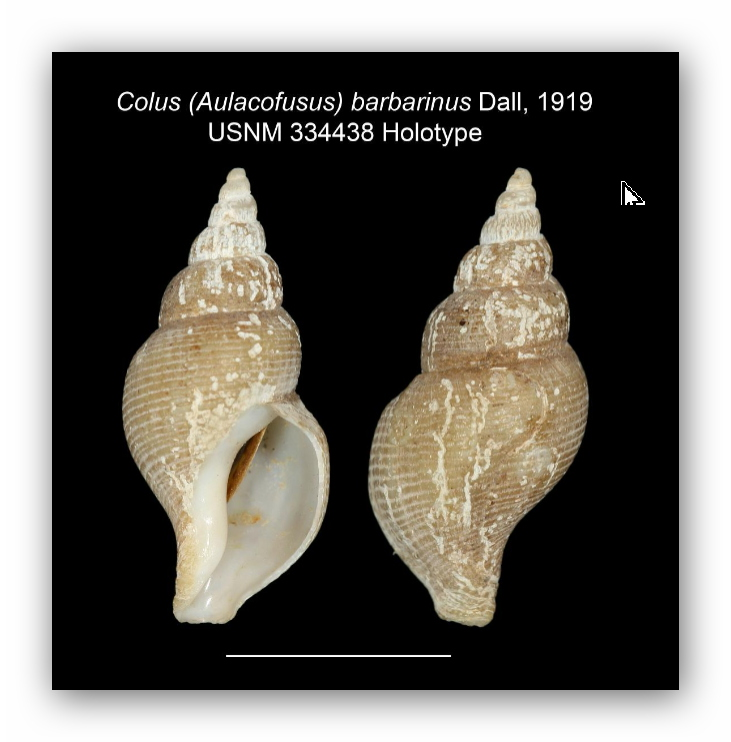
- Shell of Colus barbarinus (holotype at the Smithsonian Institution)

Scientific classification
- Kingdom: Animalia
- Phylum: Mollusca
- Class: Gastropoda
- Subclass: Caenogastropoda
- Order: Neogastropoda
- Superfamily: Buccinoidea
- Family: Colidae
- Genus: Colus
- Species: C. barbarinus

Binomial name
- Colus barbarinus Tiba, 1980

Synonyms
- Colus (Aulacofusus) barbarinus Dall, 1919; Colus (Aulacofusus) bristolensis Dall, 1919 (original combination); Colus bristolensis Dall, 1919; Latisipho bristolensis (Dall, 1919); Plicifusus barbarinus (Dall, 1919)

= Colus barbarinus =

Species of gastropod

Colus barbarinus is a species of sea snail, a marine gastropod mollusk in the family Colidae, the true whelks and the like.

== Description ==
(Description as Colus (Aulacofusus) bristolensis) The small shell measures 23.5 mm. It is white under an olivaceous periostracum. The shell contains six rounded whorls and a very minute (decorticated) protoconch. The suture is distinct and not appressed. The spiral sculpture consists of (on the penultimate whorl about 14) shallow grooves, becoming fainter on the body whorl, with much wider flat interspaces. The axial sculpture consists of faint incremental lines. The aperture is 13 mm wide and semilunate. The outer lip is sharp, thin and arcuate. The body shows a thin coat of whitish ename. The columella is short, twisted and attenuated in front The siphonal canal is short, wide and recurved.

(Description as Colus (Aulacofusus) barbarinus) The length of the small, pale gray shell attains 20 mm. It is solid. It contains about six whorls. The protoconch is compressed axially and rather acute. The suture is distinct and not appressed. The whorls are conspicuously rounded; there is no axial sculpture except faint incremental lines, the apical whorls are decorticated; spiral sculpture consists of incised striae with slightly rounded wider interspaces, about a dozen on the penultimate whorl, quite uniform over the whole of the body whorl. The aperture is ovate and measures 10 mm. The outer lip is thin and sharp. The white inner lip is erased. The short columella is short. The short siphonal canal is rather wide and somewhat recurved.

== Distribution ==
This marine species occurs off Alaska.
