= Cyrtulus genticus =

Scientific classification
- Kingdom: Animalia
- Phylum: Mollusca
- Class: Gastropoda
- Subclass: Caenogastropoda
- Order: Neogastropoda
- Family: Fasciolariidae
- Genus: Cyrtulus
- Species: C. genticus

Binomial name
- Cyrtulus genticus (Iredale, 1936)

Synonyms
- Colus genticus Iredale, 1936 (original combination); Fusinus genticus (Iredale, 1936)

Species of gastropod

Cyrtulus genticus is a species of predatory sea snail, a marine gastropod mollusc in the family Fasciolariidae, the spindle snails and tulip snails.

== Distribution ==
This species occurs in the Tasman Sea off Australia.
