= Plicifusus minor =

Scientific classification
- Kingdom: Animalia
- Phylum: Mollusca
- Class: Gastropoda
- Subclass: Caenogastropoda
- Order: Neogastropoda
- Superfamily: Buccinoidea
- Family: Buccinidae
- Genus: Plicifusus
- Species: P. minor

Binomial name
- Plicifusus minor (Dall, 1925)

Synonyms
- Colus minor (Dall, 1925); Volutopsius minor Dall, 1925 (original combination)

Species of gastropod

Plicifusus minor is a species of sea snail, a marine gastropod mollusk in the family Buccinidae, the true whelks.

== Description ==
The length of the shell attains 57 mm.

== Distribution ==
This marine species occurs off Hokkaido and Sakhalin in the Sea of Okhotsk.
