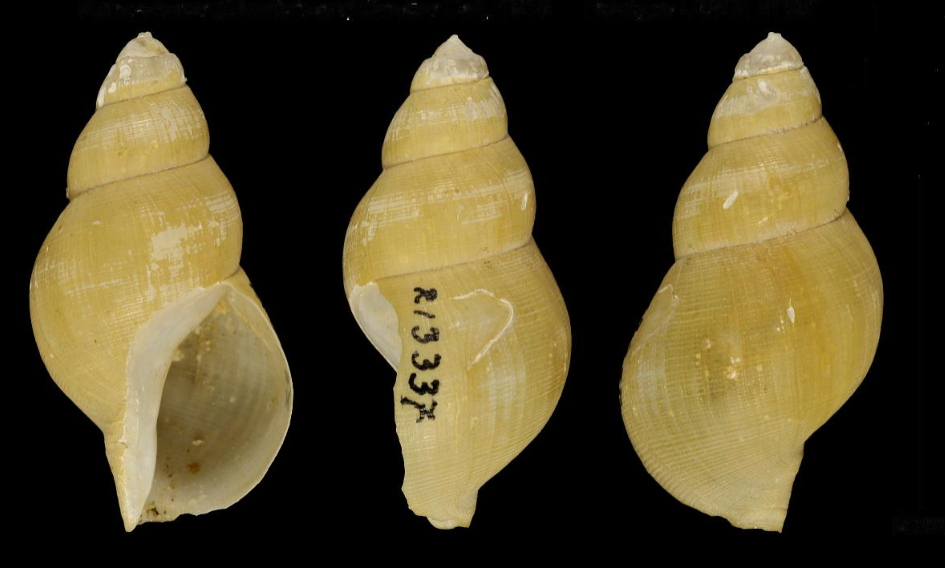
- Shell of Latisipho timetus (holotype at the Smithsonian Institution)

Scientific classification
- Kingdom: Animalia
- Phylum: Mollusca
- Class: Gastropoda
- Subclass: Caenogastropoda
- Order: Neogastropoda
- Superfamily: Buccinoidea
- Family: Buccinidae
- Genus: Latisipho
- Species: L. timetus

Binomial name
- Latisipho timetus (Dall, 1919)

Synonyms
- Aulacofusus timetus Dall, 1919; Aulacofusus (Limatofusus) timetus Dall, 1919 (original combination); Colus timetus (Dall, 1919); Limatofusus timetus (Dall, 1919)

= Latisipho timetus =

Species of gastropod

Latisipho timetus is a species of sea snail, a marine gastropod mollusk in the family Buccinidae, the true whelks.

== Description ==
(Original description at Aulacofusus (Limatofusus) timetus) The small, thin shall has a thin pale olive periostracum. Its length measures 30 mm. It contains five or more whorls. The protoconch is eroded. The suture is distinct and not appressed. There is no axial sculpture. The spiral sculpture consists of (on the penultimate whorl about 33) fine regular sharp striae with wider flat interspaces, for the most part uniform, but near the periphery tending to be wider. This sculpture covers the whole surface. The aperture is wide and semilunate. Its width measures 15 mm. The thin outer lip is gently arcuate. The white inner lip is erased. The columella is straight and attenuated in front. The siphonal canal is wide, deep, very short and with a well-marked siphonal fasciole.

== Distribution ==
This marine species occurs off Unalaska, Aleutian Islands.
