= Retifusus jessoensis =

Scientific classification
- Kingdom: Animalia
- Phylum: Mollusca
- Class: Gastropoda
- Subclass: Caenogastropoda
- Order: Neogastropoda
- Family: Retimohniidae
- Genus: Retifusus
- Species: R. jessoensis

Binomial name
- Retifusus jessoensis (Schrenck, 1863)

Synonyms
- Chrysodomus brunneus Dall, 1877; Colus brunneus (Dall, 1877); Colus jessoensis (Schrenck, 1863); Fusus manchuricus E. A. Smith, 1875; Plicifusus brunneus (Dall, 1877); Plicifusus manchuricus (A. Adams in E. A. Smith, 1875); Retifusus brunneus (Dall, 1877); Tritonium jessoense Schrenck, 1863 (original combination)

Species of gastropod

Retifusus jessoensis is a species of sea snail, a marine gastropod mollusk in the family Retimohniidae, the true whelks and the like.
