= Retifusus roseus =

Scientific classification
- Kingdom: Animalia
- Phylum: Mollusca
- Class: Gastropoda
- Subclass: Caenogastropoda
- Order: Neogastropoda
- Family: Retimohniidae
- Genus: Retifusus
- Species: R. roseus

Binomial name
- Retifusus roseus (Dall, 1877)

Synonyms
- Chrysodomus roseus Dall, 1877; Colus parvus (Tiba, 1980); Colus roseus (Dall, 1877); Limatofusus roseus (Dall, 1877); Plicifusus parvus Tiba, 1980; Plicifusus saginatus Tiba, 1983

Species of gastropod

Retifusus roseus is a species of sea snail, a marine gastropod mollusk in the family Retimohniidae, the true whelks and the like.
