= Colidae =

Scientific classification
- Kingdom: Animalia
- Phylum: Mollusca
- Class: Gastropoda
- Subclass: Caenogastropoda
- Order: Neogastropoda
- Superfamily: Buccinoidea
- Family: Colidae; Gray, 1857

Genera
- See text

Synonyms
- Colinae Gray, 1857

Family of sea snails

The Colidae are a taxonomic family of large sea snails, belonging to the superfamily Buccinoidea.

== Genera ==
- Colus Röding, 1798
- Kryptos Dautzenberg & H. Fischer, 1896
- Turrisipho Dautzenberg & H. Fischer, 1912

Synonyms

- Atractus Agassiz, 1839: synonym of Colus Röding, 1798 (invalid: junior homonym of Atractus Wagler, 1828 [Reptilia]; also junior objective synonym of Colus)
- Colicryptus Iredale, 1918: synonym of Turrisipho Dautzenberg & H. Fischer, 1912
- Sipho Mörch, 1852: synonym of Colus Röding, 1798
- Siphonorbis Mörch, 1869: synonym of Colus Röding, 1798
- Tritonofusus Beck, 1847: synonym of Colus Röding, 1798 (junior objective synonym of Colus)
