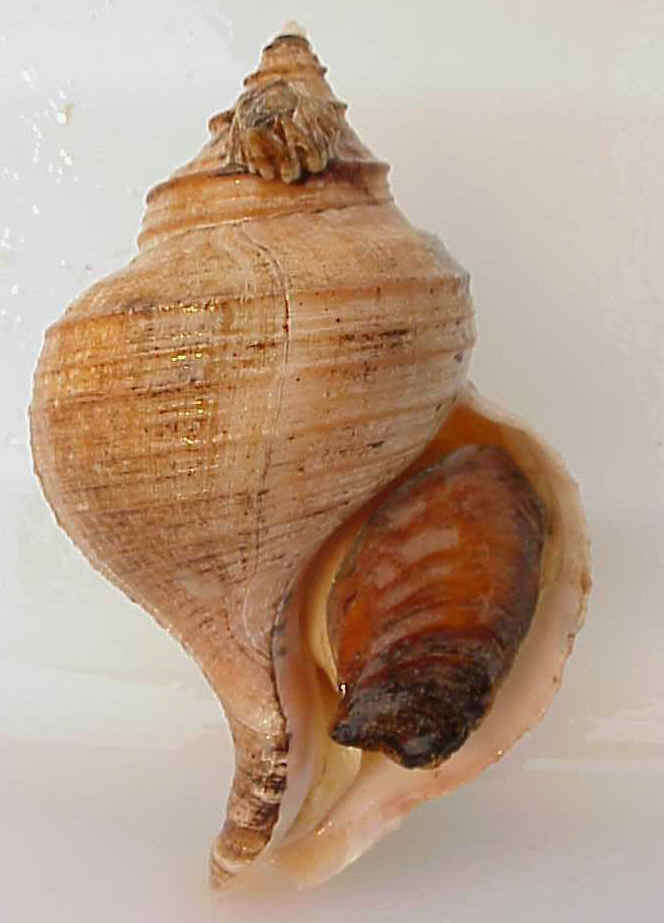
- Apertural view of a shell of Neptunea pribiloffensis also showing the operculum

Scientific classification
- Kingdom: Animalia
- Phylum: Mollusca
- Class: Gastropoda
- Subclass: Caenogastropoda
- Order: Neogastropoda
- Family: Buccinidae
- Genus: Neptunea
- Species: N. pribiloffensis

Binomial name
- Neptunea pribiloffensis W. H. Dall, 1919

= Neptunea pribiloffensis =

Species of gastropod

Neptunea pribiloffensis, common name the Pribilof whelk, is a species of sea snail, a marine gastropod mollusk in the family Buccinidae, the true whelks. It is distributed across East Pacific.

== Description ==
This length of the shell attains 95–110 mm.

== Distribution ==
Northern Pacific Ocean: Bering Sea.

== Gallery ==
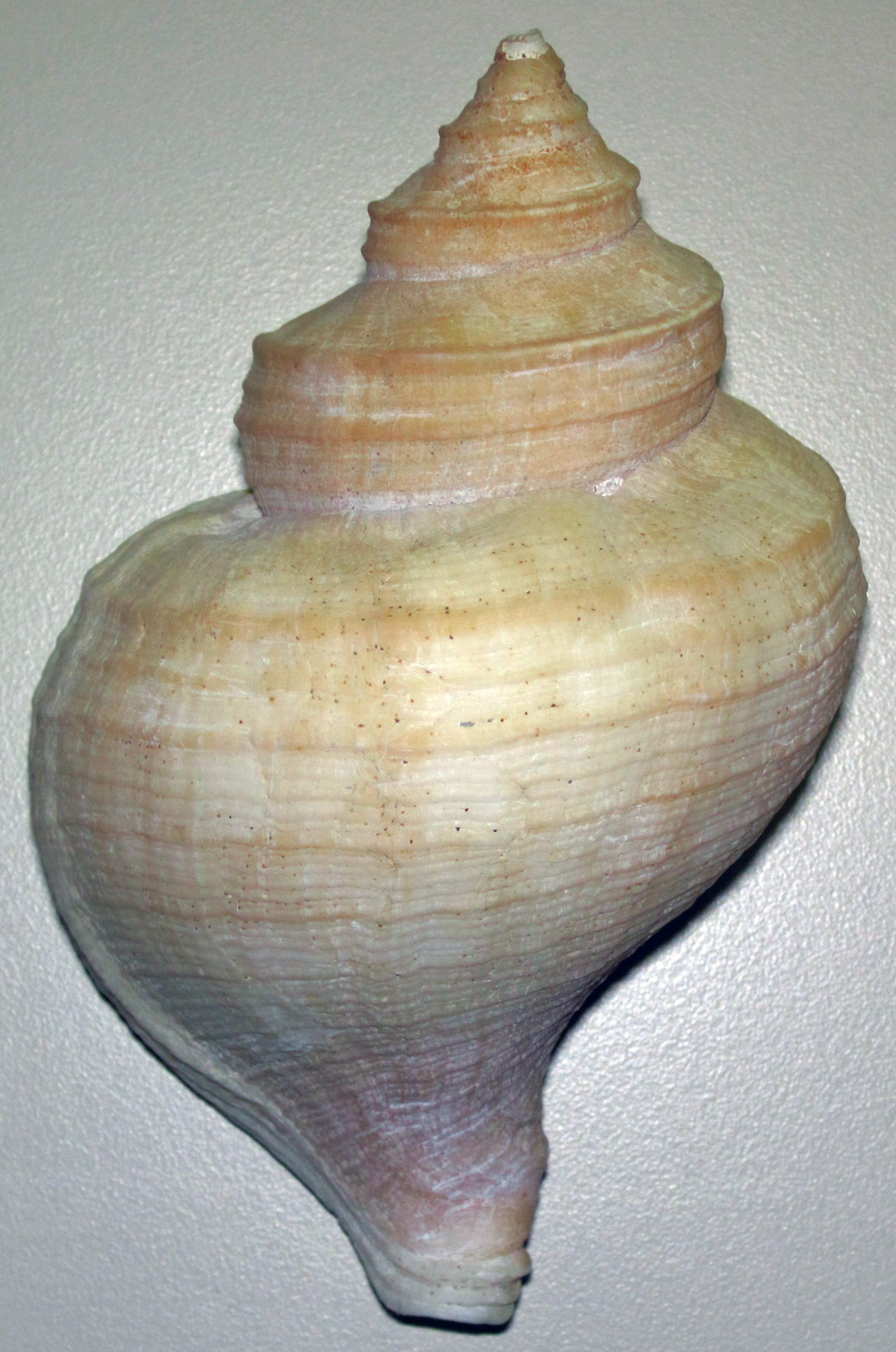
Neptunea pribiloffensis (dorsal)

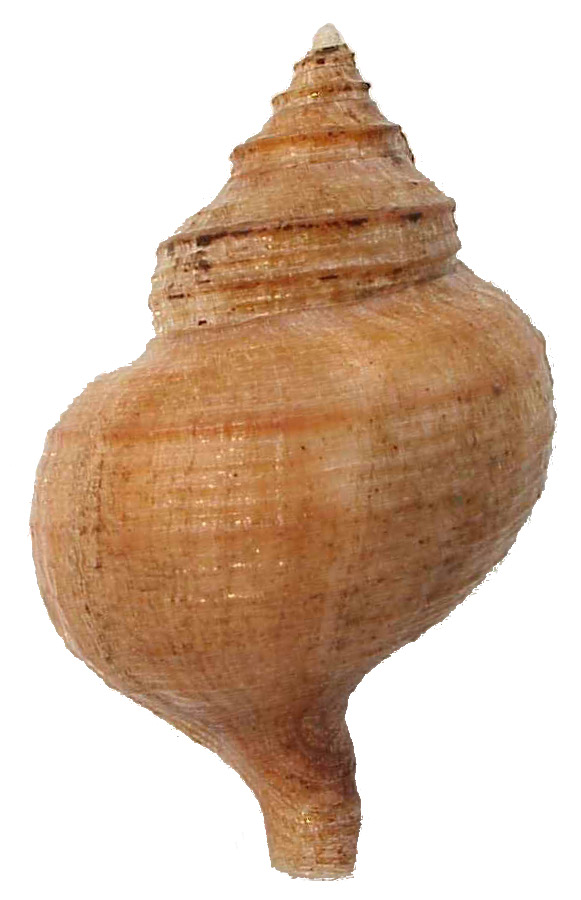
Abapertural view of the shell of Neptunea pribiloffensis.
