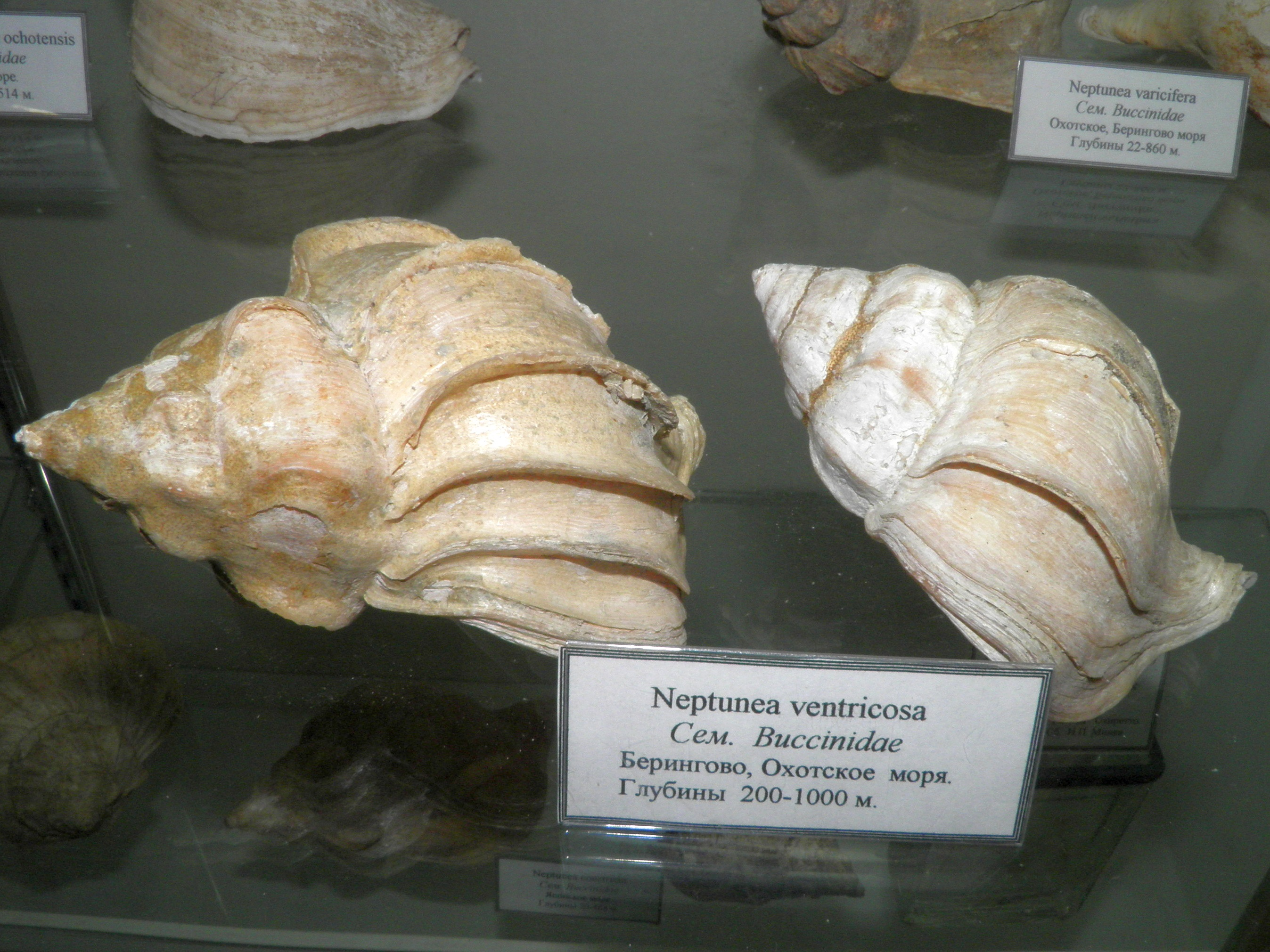
- Two views of a shell of Neptunea ventricosa

Scientific classification
- Kingdom: Animalia
- Phylum: Mollusca
- Class: Gastropoda
- Subclass: Caenogastropoda
- Order: Neogastropoda
- Family: Buccinidae
- Genus: Neptunea
- Species: N. ventricosa

Binomial name
- Neptunea ventricosa (Gmelin, 1791)

Synonyms
- Buccinum ventricosum Gmelin, 1791 (original combination); Chrysodomus nuceus Dall, 1919; Chrysodomus saturus (Martyn); Fusus bulbosus Valenciennes, 1846; Fusus fornicatus f. conica Aurivillius, 1885; Fusus fornicatus f. devexa Aurivillius, 1885; Fusus fornicatus f. intermedia Aurivillius, 1885; Fusus saturus Deshayes, 1843; Neptunea beringiana var. unicostata Golikov, 1963; Neptunea satura (Martyn, 1784) (unavailable name); Tritonium antiquum var. behringiana Middendorff, 1848

= Neptunea ventricosa =

Species of gastropod

Neptunea ventricosa is a species of sea snail, a marine gastropod mollusk in the family Buccinidae, the true whelks.

== Description ==
The length of the shell attains 105.1 mm.

== Distribution ==
This marine species occurs off Kamchatka, Russia, and off Alaska.
