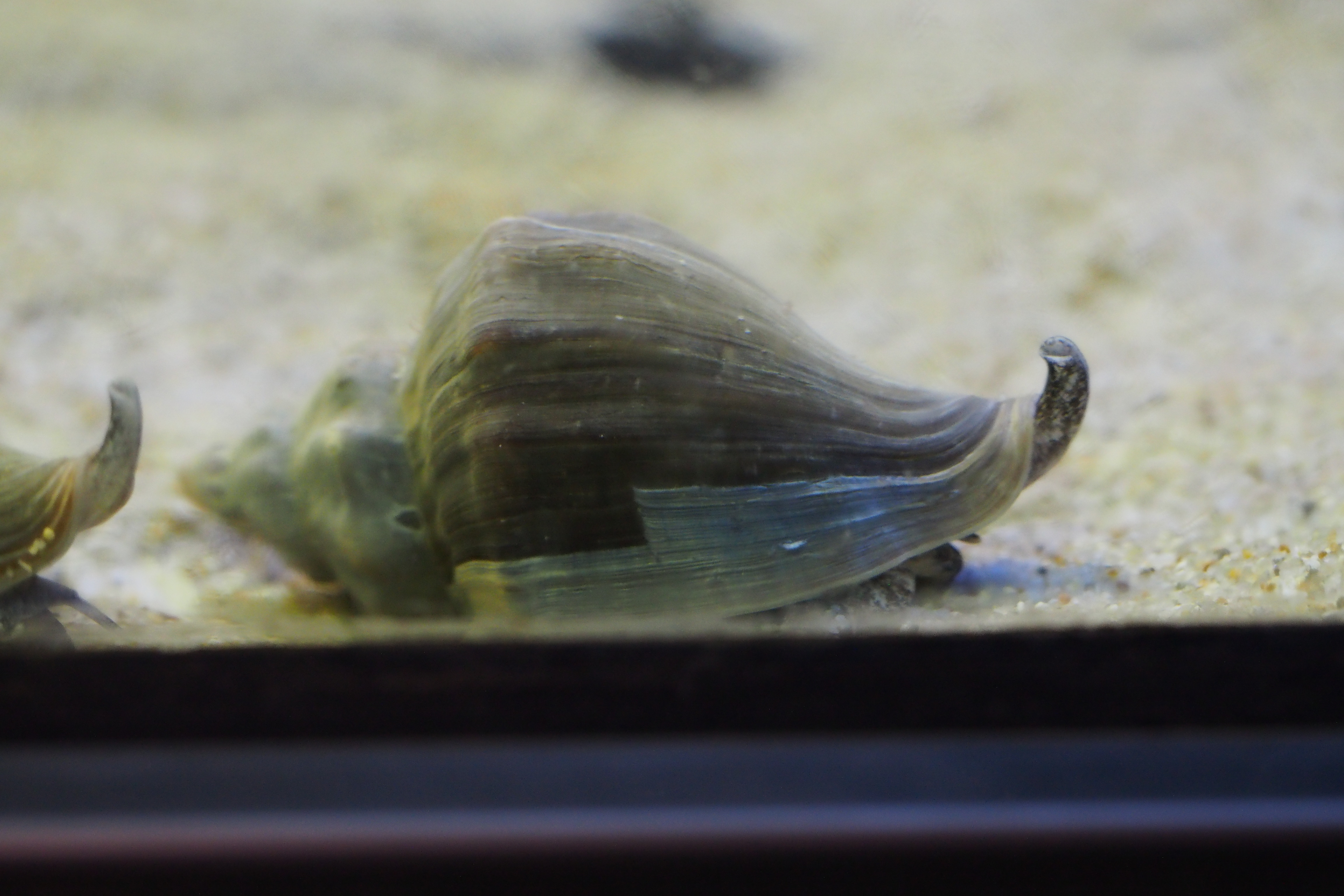

Scientific classification
- Kingdom: Animalia
- Phylum: Mollusca
- Class: Gastropoda
- Subclass: Caenogastropoda
- Order: Neogastropoda
- Family: Buccinidae
- Genus: Neptunea
- Species: N. arthritica

Binomial name
- Neptunea arthritica (Valenciennes, 1858)

Synonyms
- Barbitonia arthritica (Valenciennes, 1858); Barbitonia arthritica arthritica (Valenciennes, 1858); Barbitonia arthritica lurida (A. Adams, 1863); Fusus arthriticus Valenciennes, 1858 (original combination); Neptunea arthritica (Valenciennes, 1858); Neptunea arthritica var. asamusi Nomura & Hatai, 1937; Neptunea arthritica var. matusima Nomura & Hatai, 1937; Neptunea lurida A. Adams, 1863

= Neptunea arthritica =

Species of gastropod

Neptunea arthritica is a species of sea snail, a marine gastropod mollusk in the family Buccinidae, the true whelks.

== Description ==
The length of the shell attains 75.4 mm.

== Distribution ==
This species occurs off Japan and as an alien species in the Black Sea.

== Toxicity ==
N. arthritica contains toxic tetramethylammonium salts (referred to as "tetramine" in this context) in its tissues, especially the salivary gland, and has the potential to cause human poisoning.
