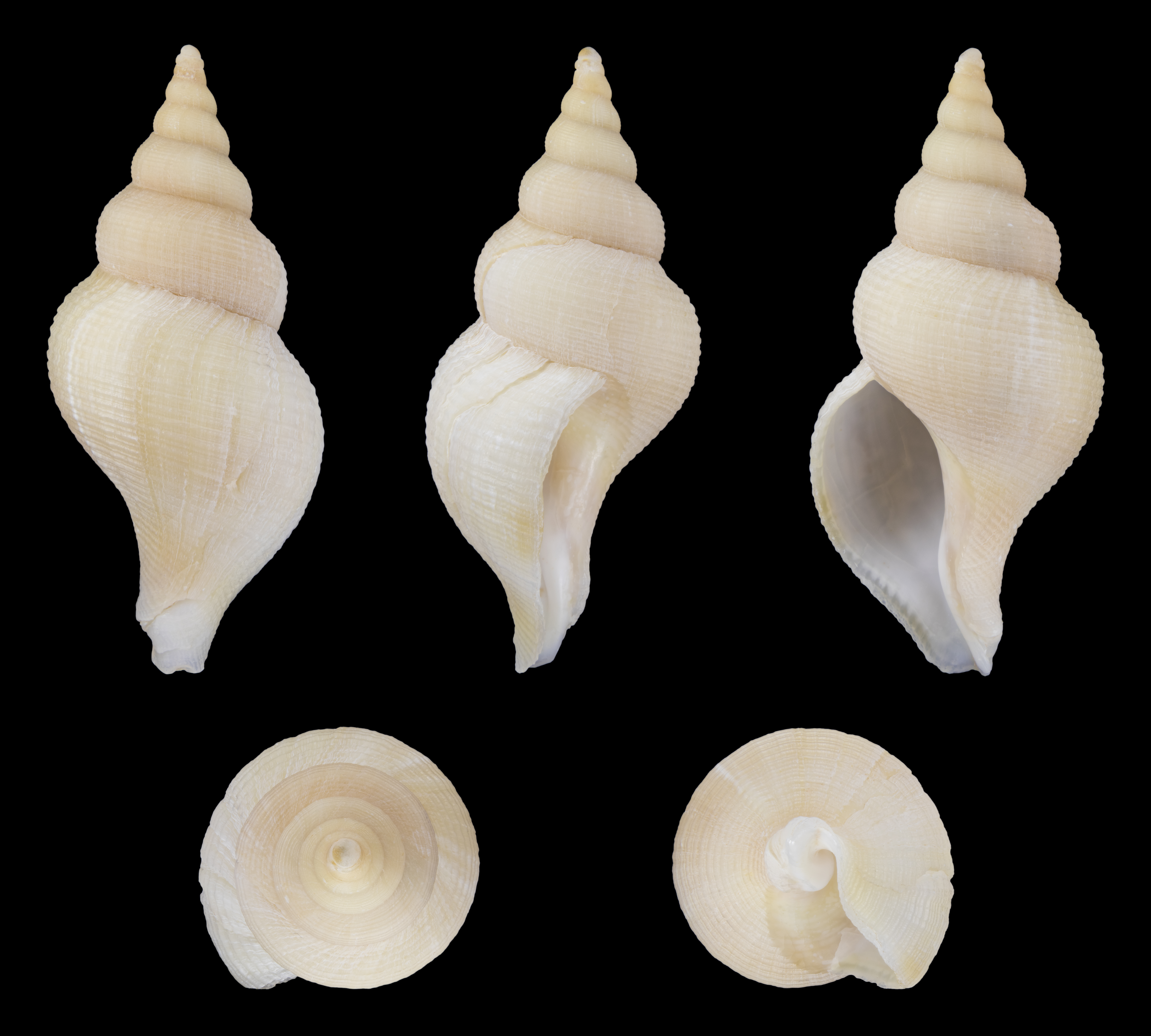
- Shell of Neptunea contraria

Scientific classification
- Kingdom: Animalia
- Phylum: Mollusca
- Class: Gastropoda
- Subclass: Caenogastropoda
- Order: Neogastropoda
- Family: Buccinidae
- Genus: Neptunea
- Species: N. contraria

Binomial name
- Neptunea contraria (Linnaeus, 1771)

Synonyms
- Fusus perversus Kiener, 1840; Fusus sinistrorsus Deshayes, 1832; Murex contrarius Linnaeus, 1771; Tritonium antiquum var. contrarium (Linnaeus, 1771)

= Neptunea contraria =

Species of gastropod

Neptunea contraria is a left-handed species of sea snail, a marine gastropod mollusk in the family Buccinidae, the true whelks.

== Description ==
Neptunea contraria is a carnivorous gastropod. They have shells that are typically sinistral, or coiled to the left. The length of the shell typically reaches around 100mm, while larger specimens can reach up to 190mm. There is not much variation in this species, and it is not easily mistaken for other gastropods. Colors of the shell can range between white and dark brown.

== Distribution ==
This species occurs in the Mediterranean Sea off Sicily. It habitats a wide range of depths, from around 100 to 800 meters deep.
