= Neptunea gyroscopoides =

Scientific classification
- Kingdom: Animalia
- Phylum: Mollusca
- Class: Gastropoda
- Subclass: Caenogastropoda
- Order: Neogastropoda
- Family: Buccinidae
- Genus: Neptunea
- Species: N. gyroscopoides

Binomial name
- Neptunea gyroscopoides Fraussen & Terryn, 2007

Species of gastropod

Neptunea gyroscopoides is a species of sea snail, a marine gastropod mollusk in the family Buccinidae, the true whelks.

== Description ==
This cold water species attains a size of 120 mm.

== Distribution ==
Northern Pacific Ocean: Alaska.
