= Neptunea hedychra =

Scientific classification
- Kingdom: Animalia
- Phylum: Mollusca
- Class: Gastropoda
- Subclass: Caenogastropoda
- Order: Neogastropoda
- Family: Buccinidae
- Genus: Neptunea
- Species: N. hedychra

Binomial name
- Neptunea hedychra Fraussen & Terryn, 2007

Species of gastropod

Neptunea hedychra is a species of sea snail, a marine gastropod mollusk in the family Buccinidae, the true whelks.

== Description ==
Neptunea hedychra has a conical spiral shell. It has light colouration and can have tan bands running horizontally along the snail shell.
