= Neptunea ennae =

Scientific classification
- Kingdom: Animalia
- Phylum: Mollusca
- Class: Gastropoda
- Subclass: Caenogastropoda
- Order: Neogastropoda
- Family: Buccinidae
- Genus: Neptunea
- Species: N. ennae

Binomial name
- Neptunea ennae Sakurai & Tiba, 1969

Synonyms
- Neptunea (Golikovia) ennae Sakurai & Tiba, 1969

Species of sea snail

Neptunea ennae is a species of Buccinidae. It is distributed in the Sea of Japan and the East China Sea. The species was first described by Sakurai, K.I. & R. Chiba, in 1969.
