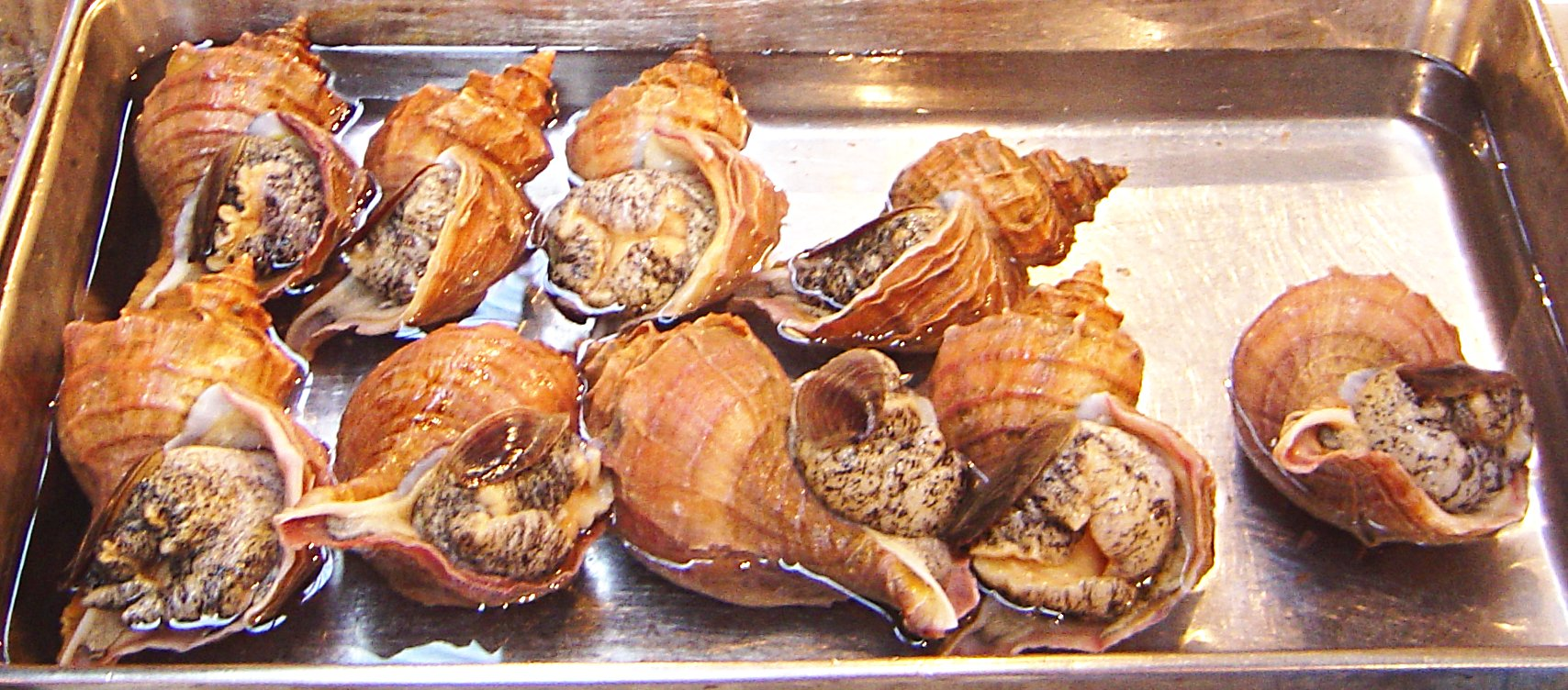

Scientific classification
- Kingdom: Animalia
- Phylum: Mollusca
- Class: Gastropoda
- Subclass: Caenogastropoda
- Order: Neogastropoda
- Family: Buccinidae
- Genus: Neptunea
- Species: N. polycostata

Binomial name
- Neptunea polycostata Scarlato in Galkin et Scarlato, 1955

Synonyms
- Neptunea polycostata polycostata Galkin & Scarlato, 1955; Neptunea satura var. polycostata Galkin & Scarlato, 1955 (basionym)

= Neptunea polycostata =

Species of gastropod

Neptunea polycostata is a species of sea snail, a marine gastropod mollusk in the family Buccinidae, the true whelks.

There is one subspecies: Neptunea polycostata aino Fraussen & Terryn, 2007 (synonym: Neptunea polycostata var. sculpturata Golikov, 1963)

== Distribution ==
Cold northern seas, Sakhalin, and Hokkaido.
