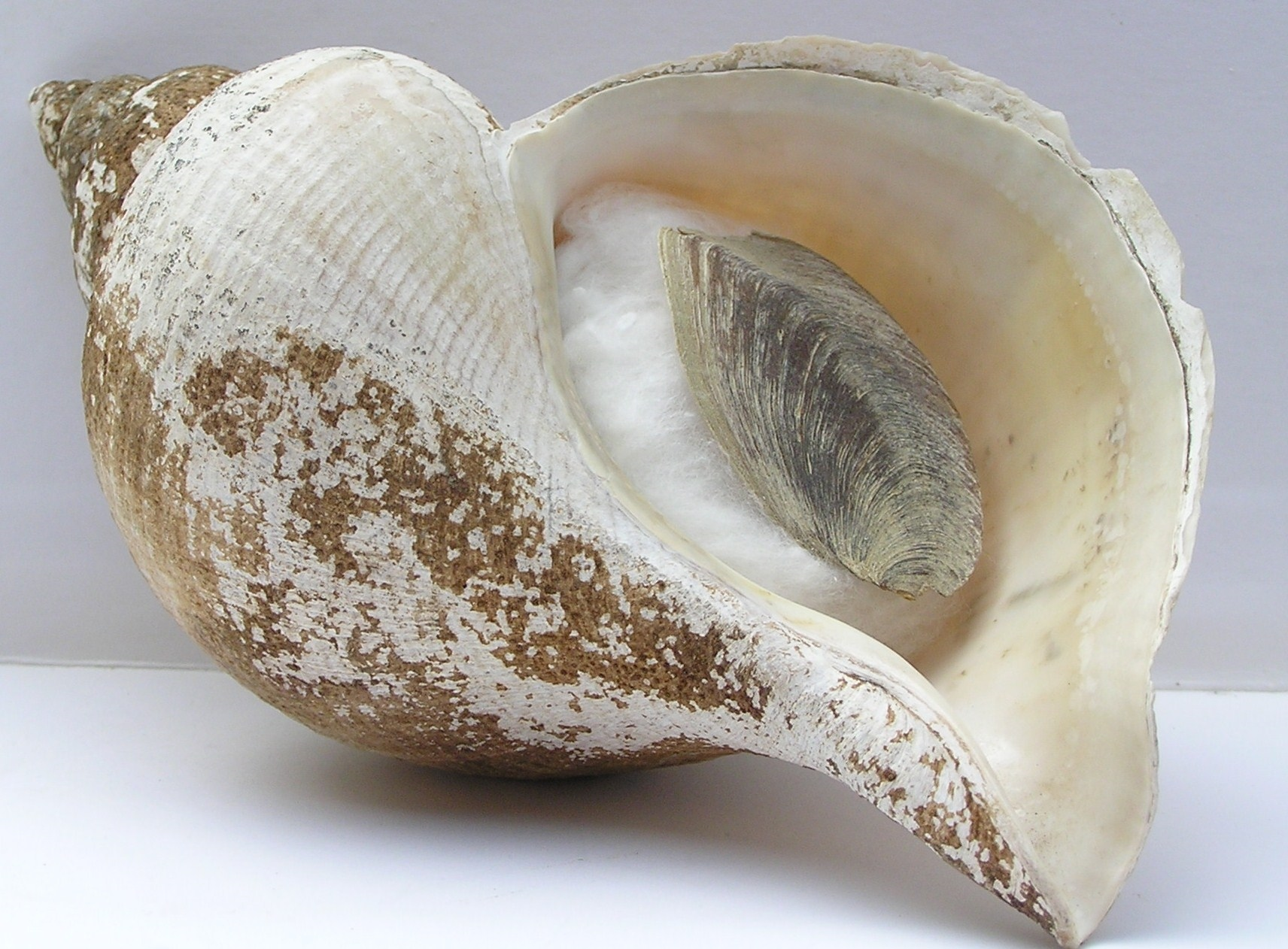
- Apertural view of a shell of Neptunea intersculpta

Scientific classification
- Kingdom: Animalia
- Phylum: Mollusca
- Class: Gastropoda
- Subclass: Caenogastropoda
- Order: Neogastropoda
- Family: Buccinidae
- Genus: Neptunea
- Species: N. intersculpta

Binomial name
- Neptunea intersculpta (Dall, 1891)

Synonyms
- Chrysodomus hypolispus Dall, 1891; Chrysodomus intersculptus G. B. Sowerby III, 1899 (original combination); Colus hypolispus (Dall, 1891); Neptunea antiqua japonica Dautzenberg & H. Fischer, 1912; Neptunea constricta (Dall, 1907)

= Neptunea intersculpta =

Species of gastropod

Neptunea intersculpta is a species of sea snail, a marine gastropod mollusk in the family Buccinidae, the true whelks.
