= Neptunea alabaster =

Scientific classification
- Kingdom: Animalia
- Phylum: Mollusca
- Class: Gastropoda
- Subclass: Caenogastropoda
- Order: Neogastropoda
- Family: Buccinidae
- Genus: Neptunea
- Species: N. alabaster

Binomial name
- Neptunea alabaster Alexeyev & Fraussen, 2005

Species of gastropod

Neptunea alabaster is a species of sea snail, a marine gastropod mollusk in the family Buccinidae, the true whelks.
