= Neptunea umbratica =

Scientific classification
- Kingdom: Animalia
- Phylum: Mollusca
- Class: Gastropoda
- Subclass: Caenogastropoda
- Order: Neogastropoda
- Family: Buccinidae
- Genus: Neptunea
- Species: N. umbratica

Binomial name
- Neptunea umbratica Fraussen & Terryn, 2007

Species of gastropod

Neptunea umbratica is a species of sea snail, a marine gastropod mollusk in the family Buccinidae, the true whelks.
