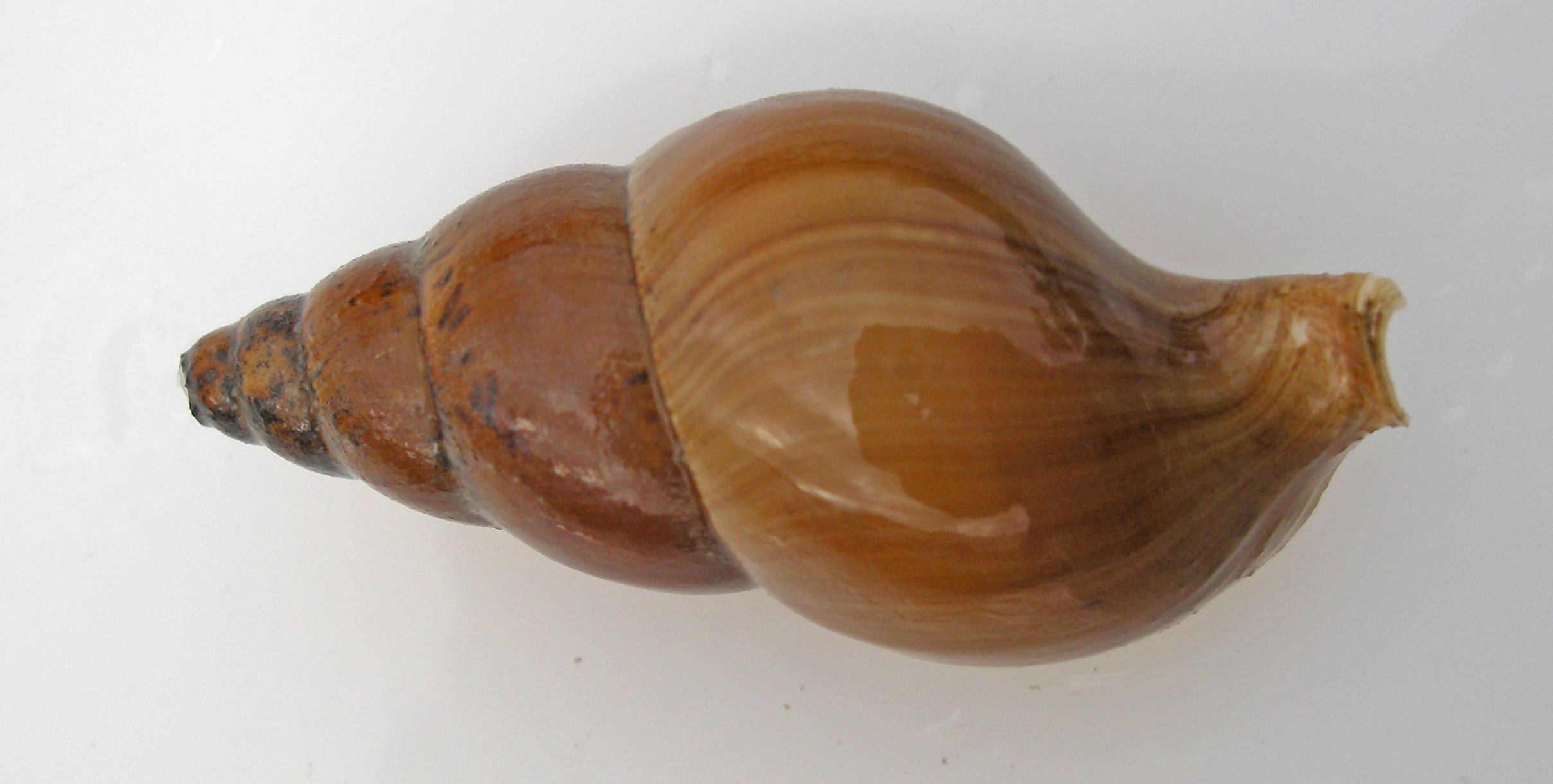

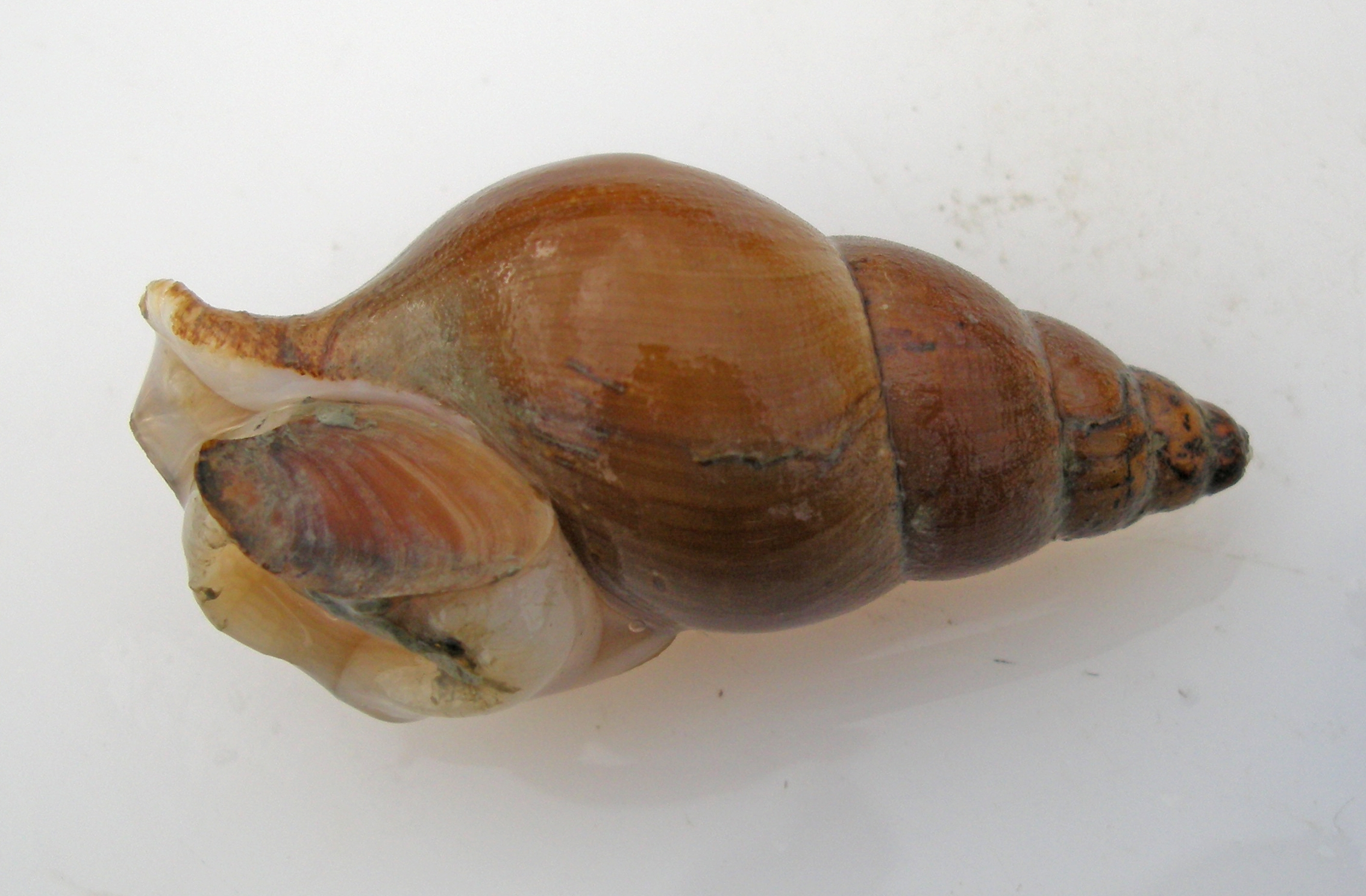

Scientific classification
- Kingdom: Animalia
- Phylum: Mollusca
- Class: Gastropoda
- Subclass: Caenogastropoda
- Order: Neogastropoda
- Superfamily: Buccinoidea
- Family: Buccinidae
- Genus: Neptunea
- Species: N. smirnia

Binomial name
- Neptunea smirnia (W. H. Dall, 1919)

Synonyms
- Chrysodomus smirnia Dall, 1919

= Neptunea smirnia =

Species of gastropod

Neptunea smirnia, the chocolate whelk, is a species of sea snail, a marine gastropod mollusk in the family Buccinidae, the true whelks. It was first described to science by William Healey Dall in 1919. The type specimen was collected from the Strait of Juan de Fuca in 114 fathoms of water.

Neptunea smirnia fossils have been identified in Pliocene epoch deposits, suggesting that this species is at least 2.5 million years old.

== Description ==
The shell is chocolate brown to tan in color. There are typically five to six whorls. The spiral edge between the whorls, or suture, is quite distinct. The larger two or three whorls may have small ridges, while the remaining, smaller, whorls are completely smooth. The aperture, or opening of the shell, is oval in shape and white in color. The siphonal canal is short and wide. The operculum, which closes the aperture, is horny and brown. Chocolate whelks can reach 11 centimetres (4.3 in) long. The maximum diameter of the shell is roughly half its length.

== Habitat and range ==
Chocolate whelks are found in the northeast Pacific Ocean from Oregon to Southeast Alaska. They are found in Puget Sound They live on soft sea bottoms from shallow waters to 300 metres (980 ft).
