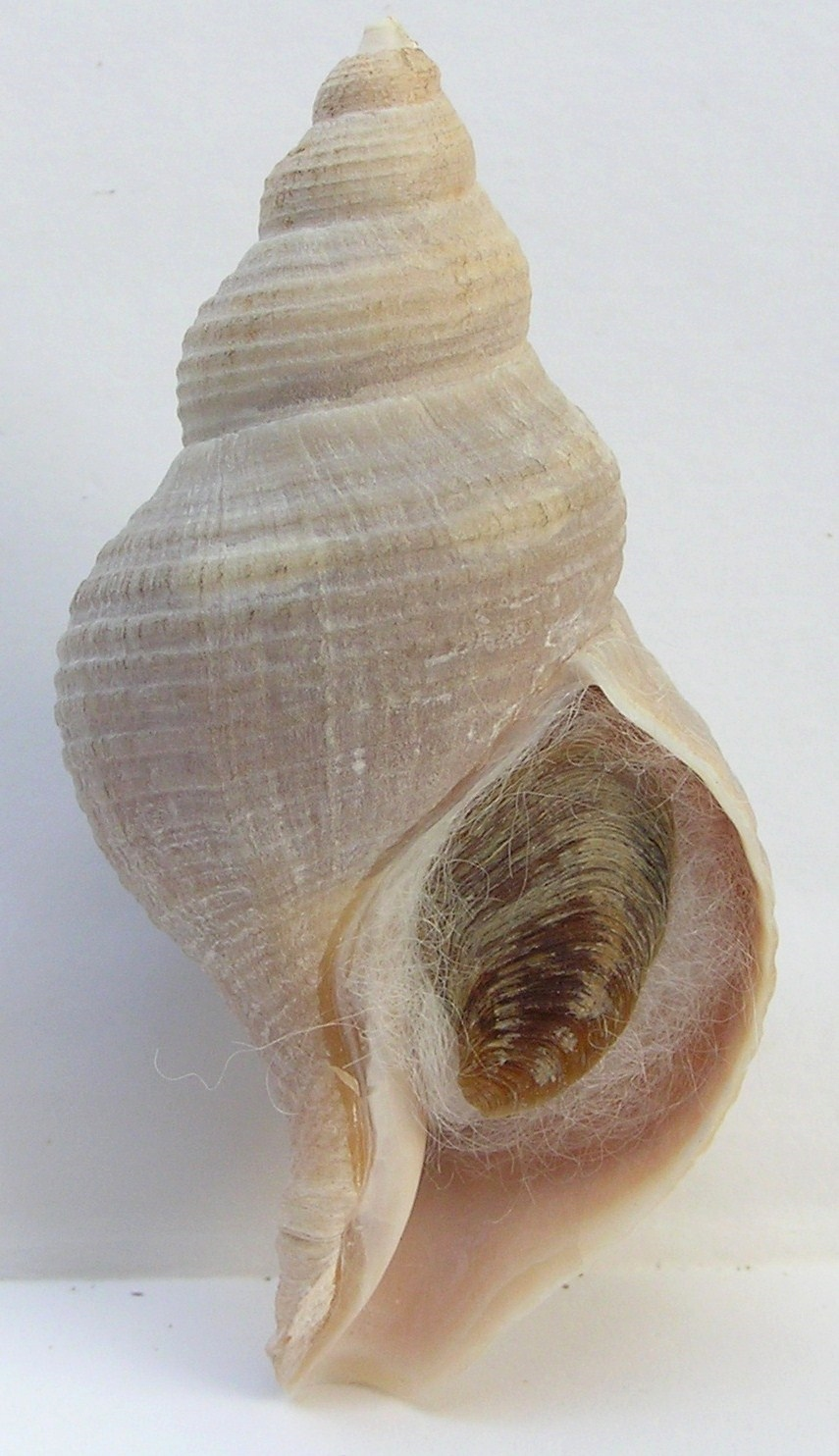
- Apertural view of a shell of Neptunea ithia, the operculum glued in place on cotton. From British Columbia, Canada.

Scientific classification
- Kingdom: Animalia
- Phylum: Mollusca
- Class: Gastropoda
- Subclass: Caenogastropoda
- Order: Neogastropoda
- Family: Buccinidae
- Genus: Neptunea
- Species: N. ithia

Binomial name
- Neptunea ithia Dall, 1891

= Neptunea ithia =

Neptunea

Species of gastropod

Neptunea ithia is a species of large sea snail or whelk, a marine gastropod mollusk in the family Buccinidae, the true whelks.
