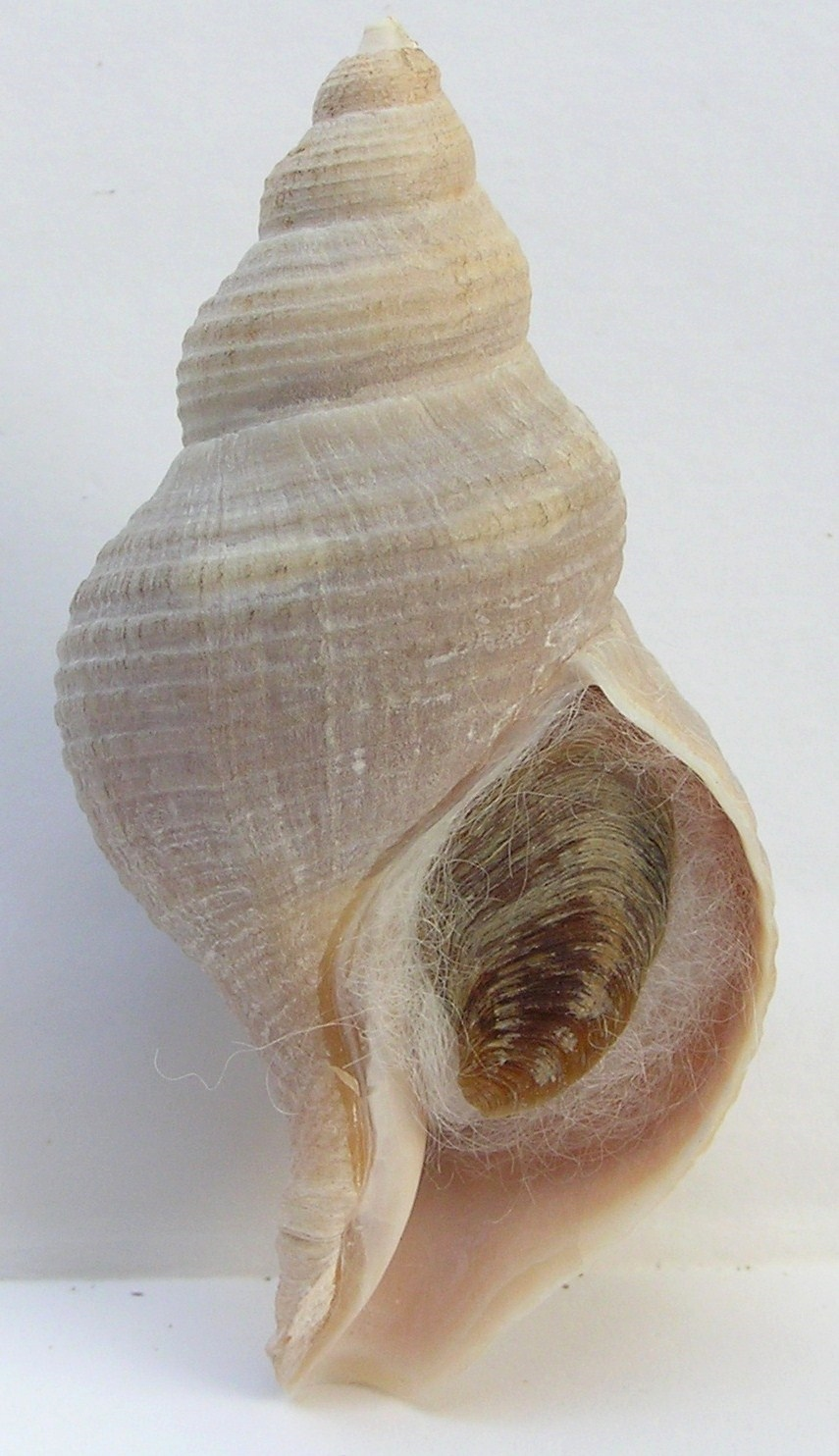
- Apertural view of a shell of Neptunea ithia, the operculum glued in place on cotton

Scientific classification
- Kingdom: Animalia
- Phylum: Mollusca
- Class: Gastropoda
- Subclass: Caenogastropoda
- Order: Neogastropoda
- Family: Buccinidae
- Genus: Neptunea; Röding, 1798

Type species
- Murex antiquus Linnaeus, 1758

Synonyms
- List: Barbitonia Dall, 1916; Buccinum (Neptunea); Chrysodomus Swainson, 1840; Chrysodomus (Barbitonia) Dall, 1916; Chrysodomus (Sulcosipho) Dall, 1916; Costaria Golikov, 1977; Fusus (Chrysodomus); Fusus (Neptunea) Röding, 1798; Golikovia Habe & Sato, 1973; Neptunea (Barbitonia) Dall, 1916; Neptunea (Golikovia) Habe & Sato, 1973; Neptunea (Neptunea) Röding, 1798; Neptunea (Sulcosipho) Dall, 1916; Neptunia Locard, 1886

= Neptunea =

Genus of gastropods

Neptunea is a genus of large sea snails, marine gastropod mollusks in the subfamily Neptuneinae of the family Buccinidae, the true whelks.

== Species ==
According to the World Register of Marine Species (WoRMS), the following species with valid names are included within the genus Neptunea:

- Neptunea acutispiralis Okutani, 1968
- Neptunea alabaster Alexeyev & Fraussen, 2005
- Neptunea alexeyevi Fraussen & Terryn, 2007
- Neptunea amianta (Dall, 1890)
- Neptunea angulata Harmer, 1914 †
- Neptunea antarctocostata Stilwell & Zinsmeister, 1992 †
- Neptunea antiqua (Linnaeus, 1758)
- Neptunea arthritica (Valenciennes, 1858)
- Neptunea aurigena Fraussen & Terryn, 2007
- Neptunea behringiana (Middendorff, 1848)
- Neptunea borealis (R. A. Philippi, 1850)
- Neptunea bulbacea (Valenciennes, 1858)
- Neptunea communis (Middendorff, 1849)
- Neptunea constricta (Dall, 1907)
- Neptunea contraria (Linnaeus, 1771)
- Neptunea convexa Goryachev, 1978
- Neptunea costaria Fraussen & Terryn, 2007
- Neptunea cumingii Crosse, 1862
- Neptunea cuspidis Fraussen & Terryn, 2007
- Neptunea cybaea Fraussen & Terryn, 2007
- Neptunea decemcostata (Say, 1826)
- Neptunea denselirata Brøgger, 1901
- Neptunea despecta (Linnaeus, 1758)
- Neptunea elegantula Ito & Habe, 1965
- Neptunea ennae Sakurai & Tiba, 1969
- Neptunea eulimata (Dall, 1907)
- Neptunea excelsior Fraussen & Terryn, 2017
- Neptunea fitchi (R. N. Clark, 2022)
- Neptunea flatteryensis R. N. Clark, 2022
- Neptunea frater (Pilsbry, 1901)
- Neptunea fukueae Kira, 1959
- Neptunea gulbini Goryachev & Kantor, 1983
- Neptunea gyroscopoides Fraussen & Terryn, 2007
- Neptunea hedychra Fraussen & Terryn, 2007
- Neptunea heros (Gray, 1850)
- Neptunea hesperica Fraussen & Terryn, 2007
- Neptunea hiberna Fraussen & Terryn, 2007
- Neptunea humboldtiana A. G. Smith, 1971
- Neptunea insularis (Dall, 1895)
- Neptunea intersculpta (G. B. Sowerby III, 1899)
- Neptunea inversa Harmer, 1918 †
- Neptunea ithia (Dall, 1891)
- Neptunea jagudinae Goryachev & Kantor, 1983
- Neptunea kuroshio Oyama, 1959
- Neptunea laeva Golikov, Goryachev & Kantor, 1987
- Neptunea lamellosa Golikov, 1962
- Neptunea laticostata Golikov, 1962
- Neptunea lyrata (Gmelin, 1791)
- Neptunea lyratodespecta Strauch, 1972 †
- Neptunea magnanimita Fraussen & Terryn, 2007
- Neptunea mcleani R. N. Clark, 2020
- Neptunea meridionalis A. G. Smith, 1971
- Neptunea middendorffiana MacGinitie, 1959
- Neptunea mikawaensis T. Nakano, Kurihara, Miyoshi & Higuchi, 2010
- Neptunea multistriata (Aurivillius, 1885)
- Neptunea nivea Okutani, 1981
- Neptunea nodositella Fraussen & Terryn, 2007
- Neptunea occaecata Fraussen & Terryn, 2007
- Neptunea ochotensis Golikov, 1962
- Neptunea oncodes (Dall, 1907)
- Neptunea phoenicea (Dall, 1891)
- Neptunea polycostata Scarlato, 1955
- Neptunea pribiloffensis (Dall, 1919)
- Neptunea purpurea Tiba, 1983
- Neptunea robusta Okutani, 1964
- Neptunea rugosa Golikov, 1962
- Neptunea smirnia (Dall, 1919)
- Neptunea stilesi A. G. Smith, 1968
- Neptunea stonei (Pilsbry, 1892) †
- Neptunea subdilatata (Yen, 1936)
- Neptunea tabulata (Baird, 1863)
- Neptunea tuberculata (Yokoyama, 1929)
- Neptunea umbratica Fraussen & Terryn, 2007
- Neptunea varicifera (Dall, 1907)
- Neptunea ventricosa (Gmelin, 1791)
- Neptunea vinlandica Fraussen & Terryn, 2007
- Neptunea vinosa (Dall, 1919)
- Neptunea vladivostokensis (Bartsch, 1929)

Species brought into synonymy

- Neptunea (Trophonopsis): synonym of Trophonopsis Bucquoy, Dautzenberg & Dollfus, 1882
- Neptunea (Trophonopsis) lasia Dall, 1919: synonym of Scabrotrophon lasius (Dall, 1919)
- Neptunea apolyonis Dall, 1919: synonym of Boreotrophon apolyonis (Dall, 1919)
- Neptunea arthritica (Bernardi, 1857): synonym of Barbitonia arthritica (Valenciennes, 1858)
- Neptunea beringi (Dall, 1902): synonym of Boreotrophon clathratus (Linnaeus, 1767)
- Neptunea berniciensis (King, 1846): synonym of Troschelia berniciensis (King, 1846)
- Neptunea bonaespei Barnard, 1963: synonym of Buccipagoda bonaespei (Barnard, 1963)
- Neptunea brevicauda (Deshayes, 1832): synonym of Aulacofusus brevicauda (Deshayes, 1832)
- Neptunea caelata Verrill, 1880: synonym of Retimohnia caelata (Verrill & Smith in Verrill, 1880)
- Neptunea callicerata Dall, 1919: synonym of Boreotrophon avalonensis Dall, 1902
- Neptunea cincta Link, 1807: synonym of Filifusus filamentosus (Röding, 1798)
- Neptunea dalli Friele, 1882: synonym of Granulifusus dalli (Watson, 1882)
- Neptunea danielsseni (Friele, 1879): synonym of Mohnia danielsseni (Friele, 1879)
- Neptunea denselirata Brögger, 1901: synonym of Neptunea despecta (Linnaeus, 1758)
- Neptunea doliata Röding, 1798: synonym of Gelagna succincta (Linnaeus, 1771)
- Neptunea ecaudata Link, 1807: synonym of Latirus gibbulus (Gmelin, 1791)
- Neptunea ecaudis Locard, 1897: synonym of Turrisipho fenestratus (Turton, 1834)
- Neptunea elegantula Dall, 1907: synonym of Boreotrophon elegantulus (Dall, 1907)
- Neptunea fasciata Jaeckel, 1952: synonym of Neptunea despecta (Linnaeus, 1758)
- Neptunea hanseni Friele, 1879: synonym of Colus sabini (Gray, 1824)
- Neptunea ithitoma Dall, 1919: synonym of Boreotrophon alaskanus Dall, 1902
- Neptunea kotakamaruae Ito & Habe, 1965: synonym of Neptunea elegantula Ito & Habe, 1965
- Neptunea lachesis (Mörch, 1869): synonym of Turrisipho lachesis (Mörch, 1869)
- Neptunea laevigata Link, 1807: synonym of Fasciolaria tulipa (Linnaeus, 1758)
- Neptunea lurida A. Adams, 1863: synonym of Barbitonia arthritica (Valenciennes, 1858)
- Neptunea magellanicus Röding, 1798: synonym of Fusitriton magellanicus (Röding, 1798)
- Neptunea middendorffiana MacGinitie, 1959: synonym of Neptunea heros Gray, 1850
- Neptunea minor (Hirase, 1908): synonym of Neptunea kuroshio Oyama in Kira, 1959
- Neptunea oncoda (Dall, 1907): synonym of Neptunea onchodes (Dall, 1907)
- Neptunea ossiania Friele, 1879: synonym of Beringius ossianius (Friele, 1879)
- Neptunea peregra Locard, 1897: synonym of Turrisipho fenestratus (Turton, 1834)
- Neptunea pertenuis Sykes, 1911: synonym of Retifusus latericeus (Møller, 1842)
- Neptunea pusilla Röding, 1798: synonym of Nassaria pusilla (Röding, 1798)
- Neptunea satura (Martyn, 1784): synonym of Neptunea ventricosa (Gmelin, 1791)
- Neptunea soluta (Hermann, 1781): synonym of Buccinum undatum Linnaeus, 1758
- Neptunea staphylina Dall, 1919: synonym of Boreotrophon bentleyi Dall, 1908
- Neptunea taeniata (G.B. Sowerby II, 1880): synonym of Neptunea cumingii Crosse, 1862
- Neptunea terebralis Gould, 1860: synonym of Aulacofusus brevicauda (Deshayes, 1832)
- Neptunea tolomia Dall, 1919: synonym of Boreotrophon tolomius (Dall, 1919)
- Neptunea virgata Friele, 1879: synonym of Anomalisipho verkruezeni (Kobelt, 1876)

== Gallery of shells ==
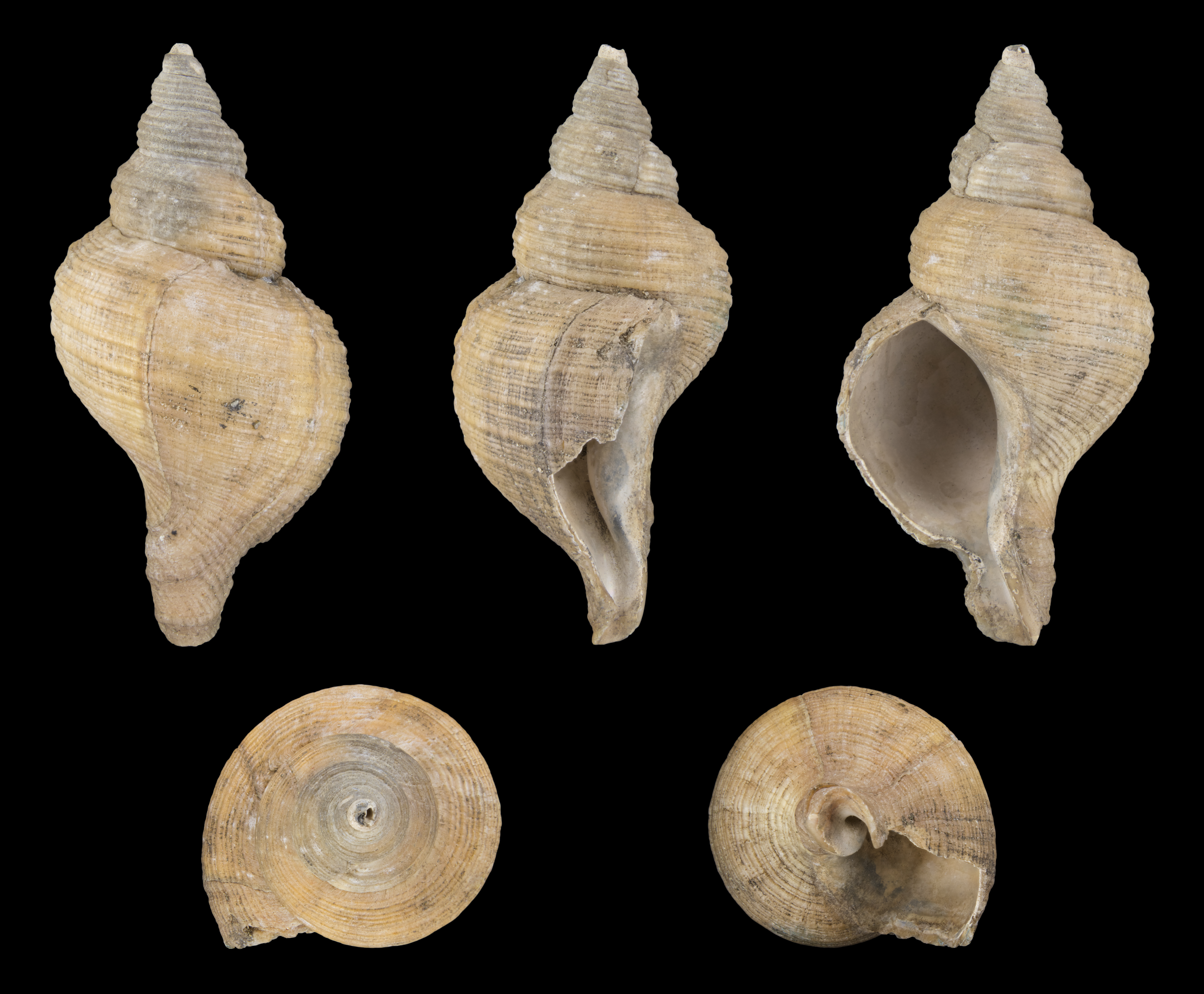
Neptunea angulata

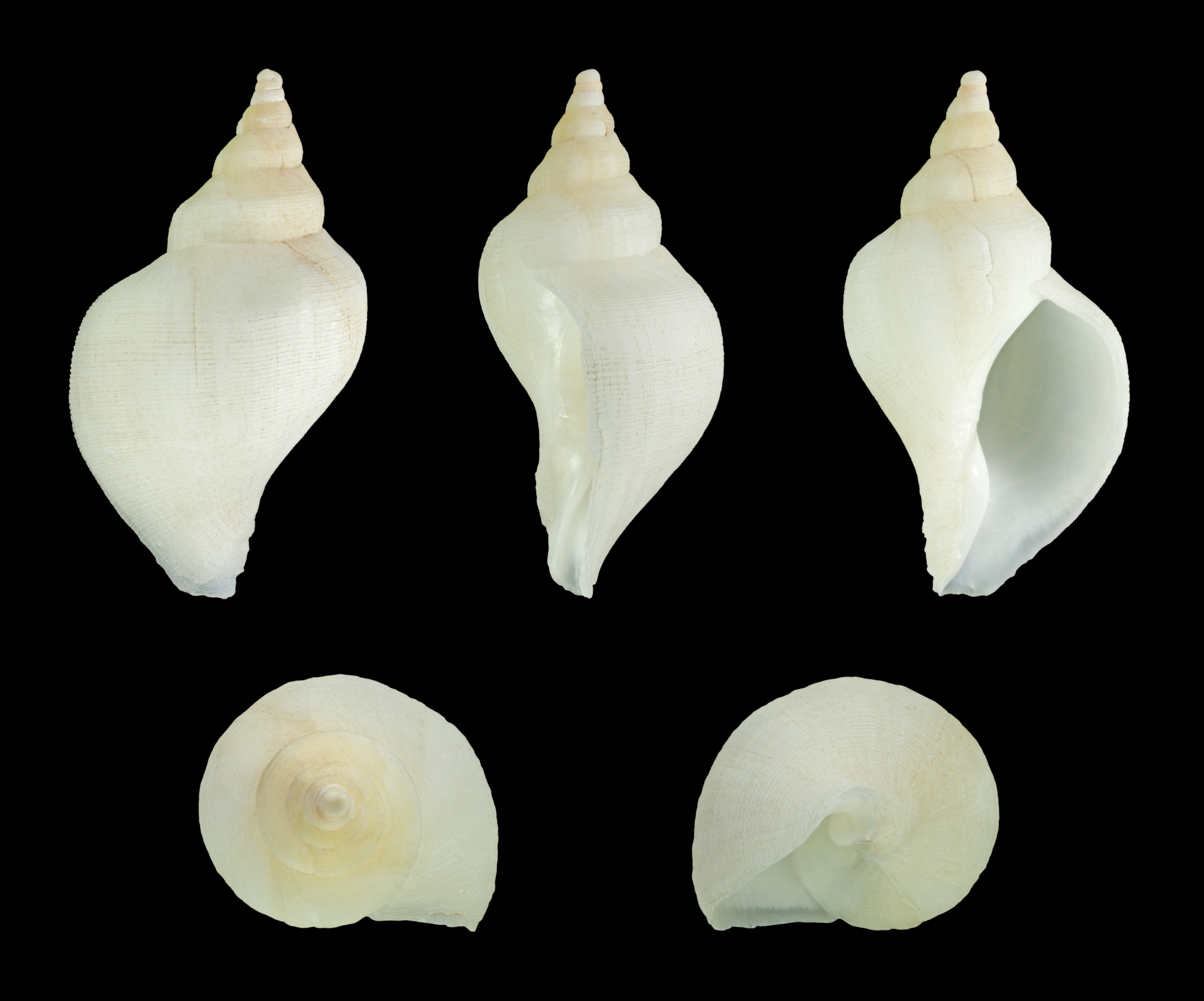
Neptunea antiqua

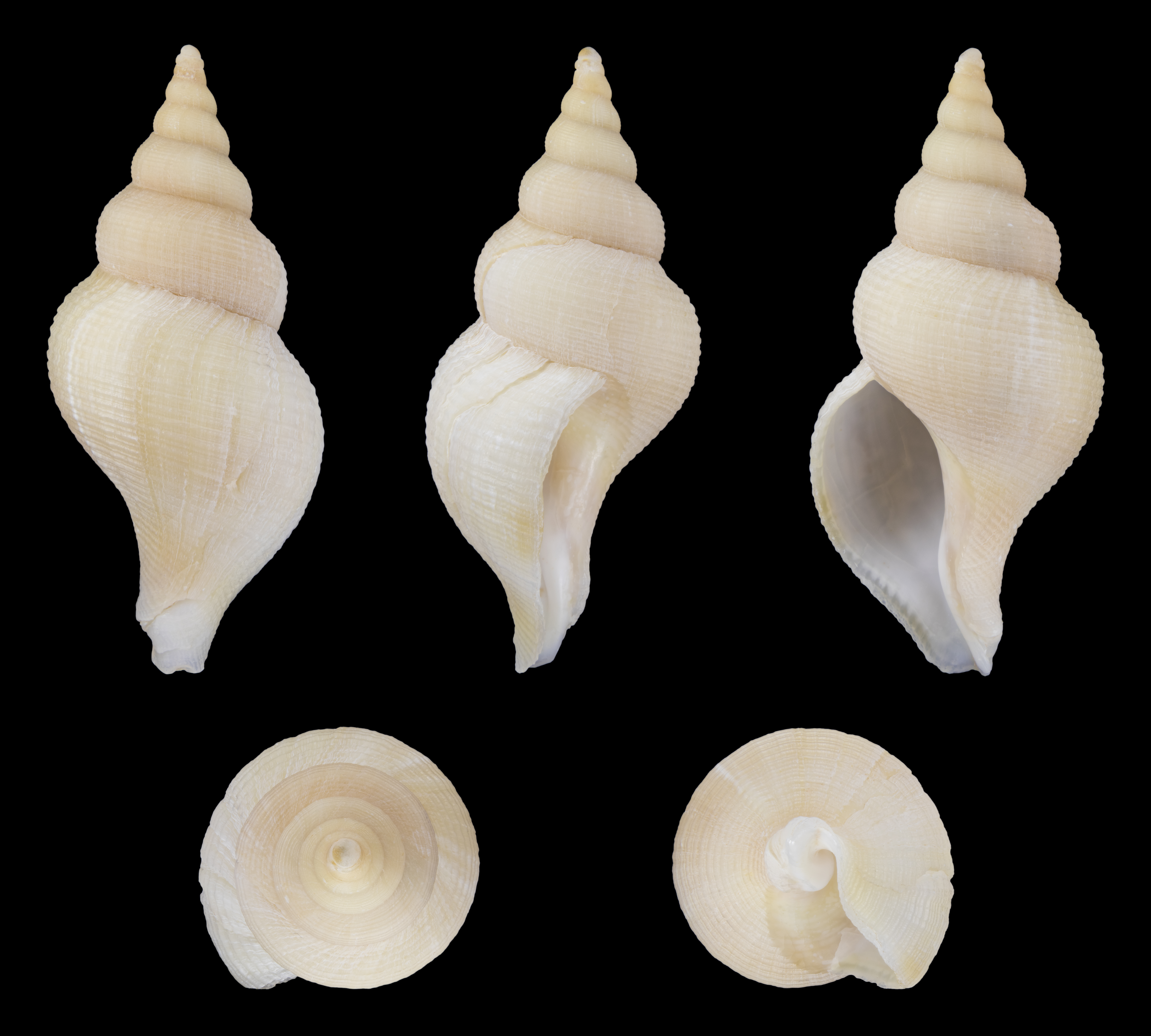
Neptunea contraria

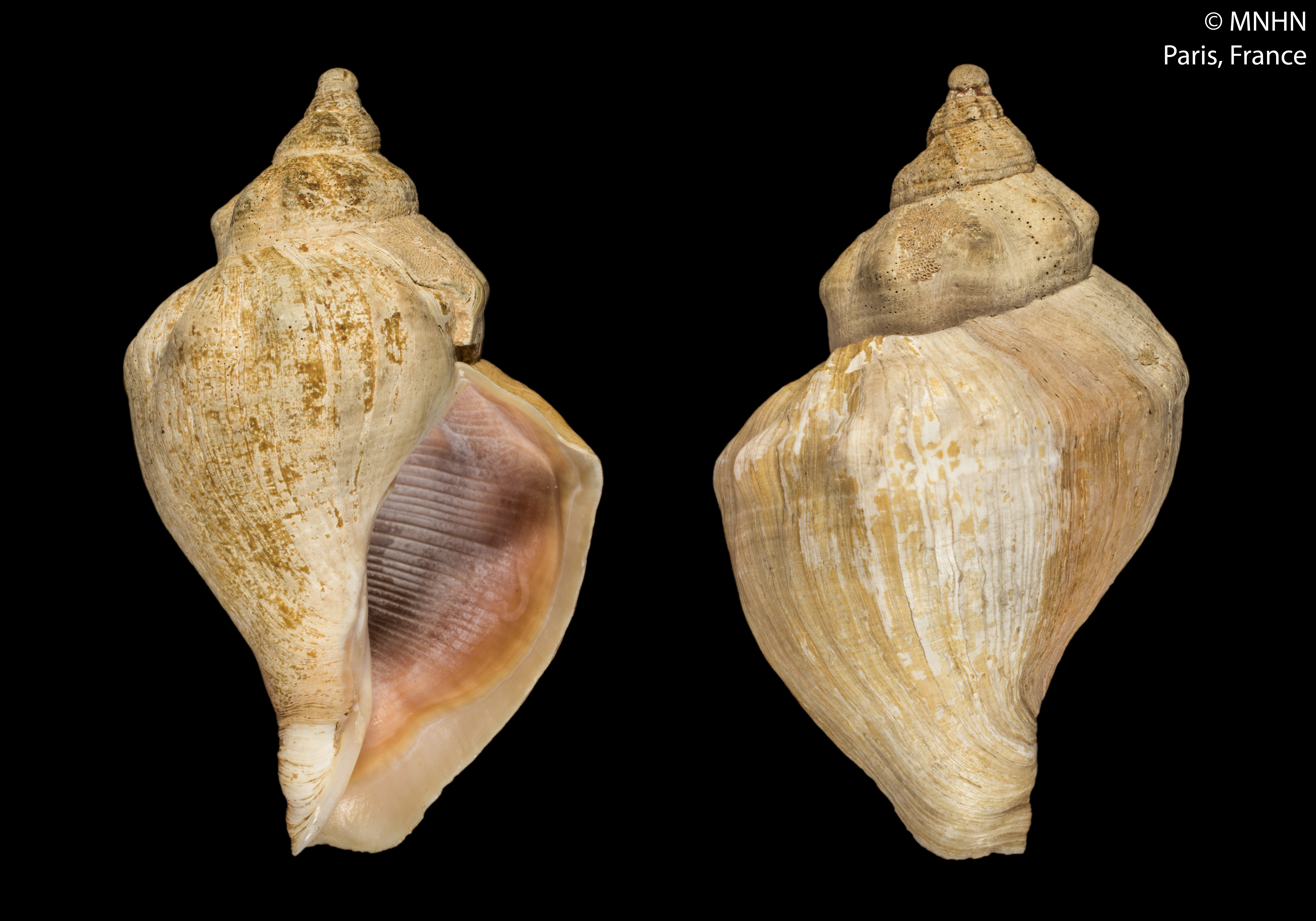
Neptunea arthritica

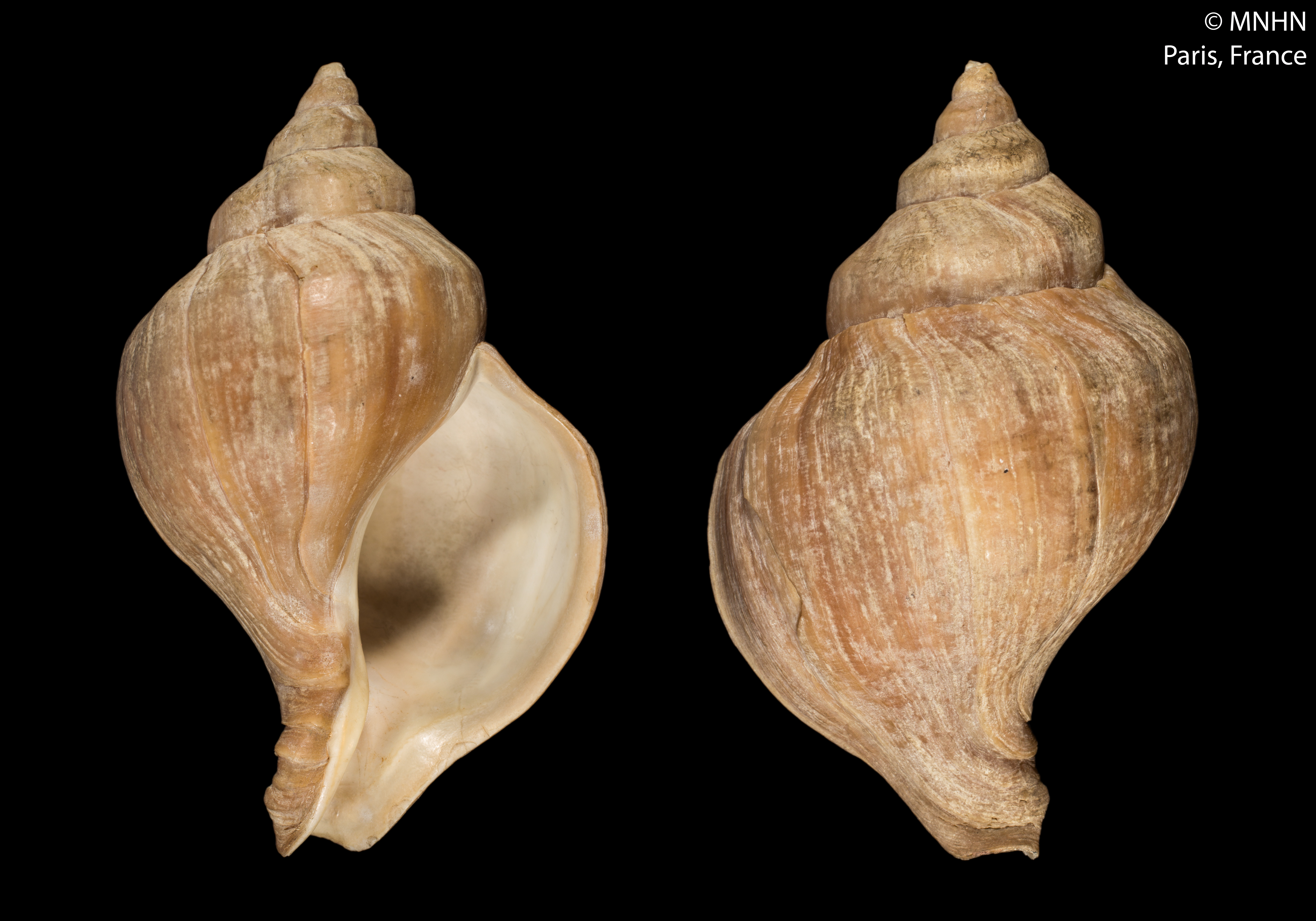
Neptunea bulbacea

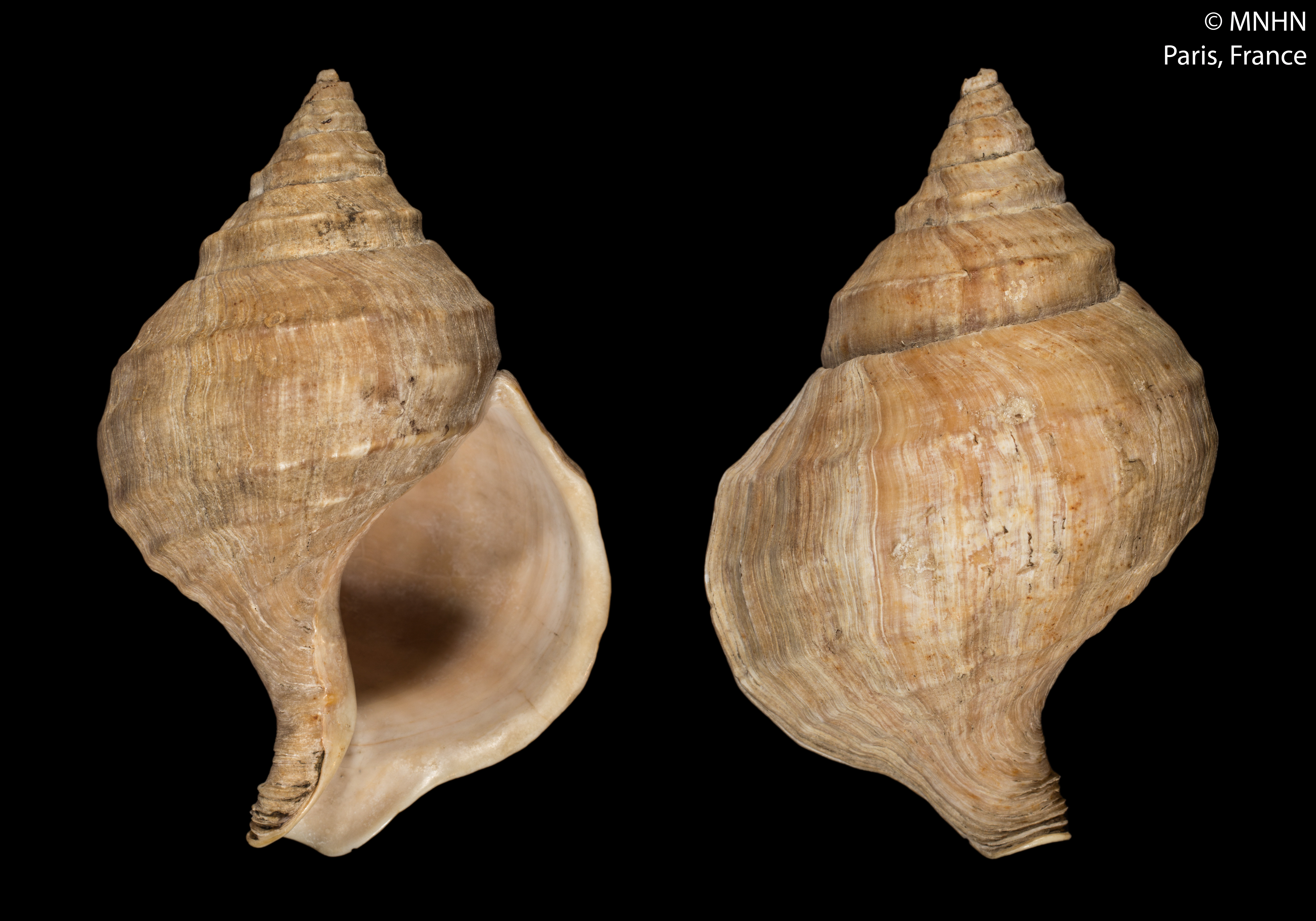
Neptunea ventricosa

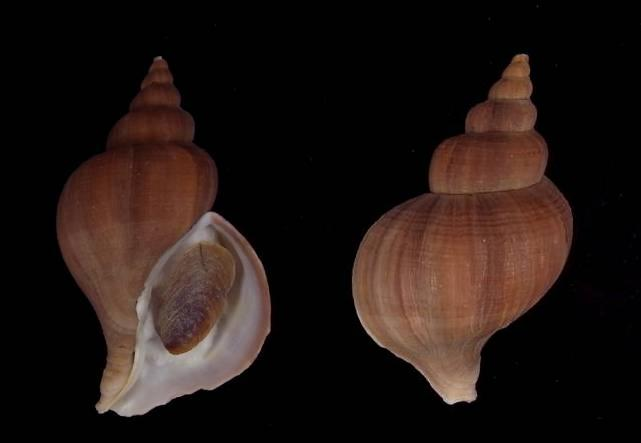
Neptunea vladivostokensis

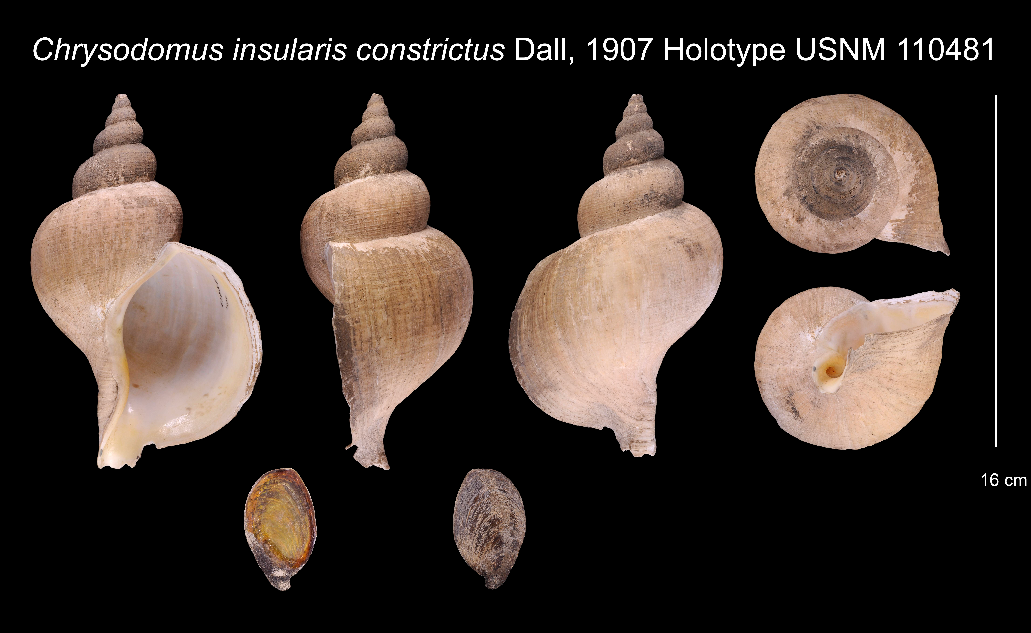
Neptunea constricta

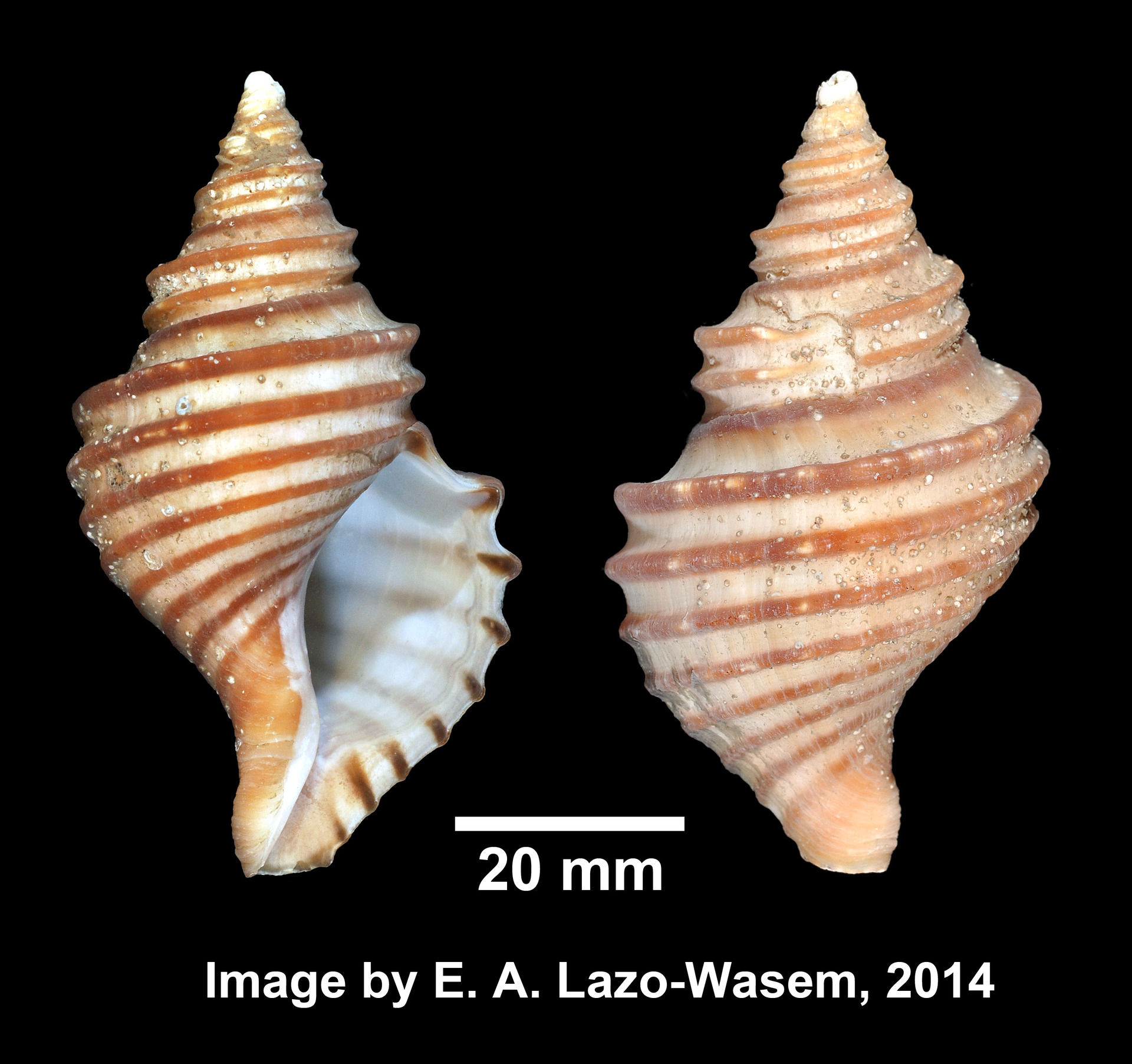
Neptunea decemcostata

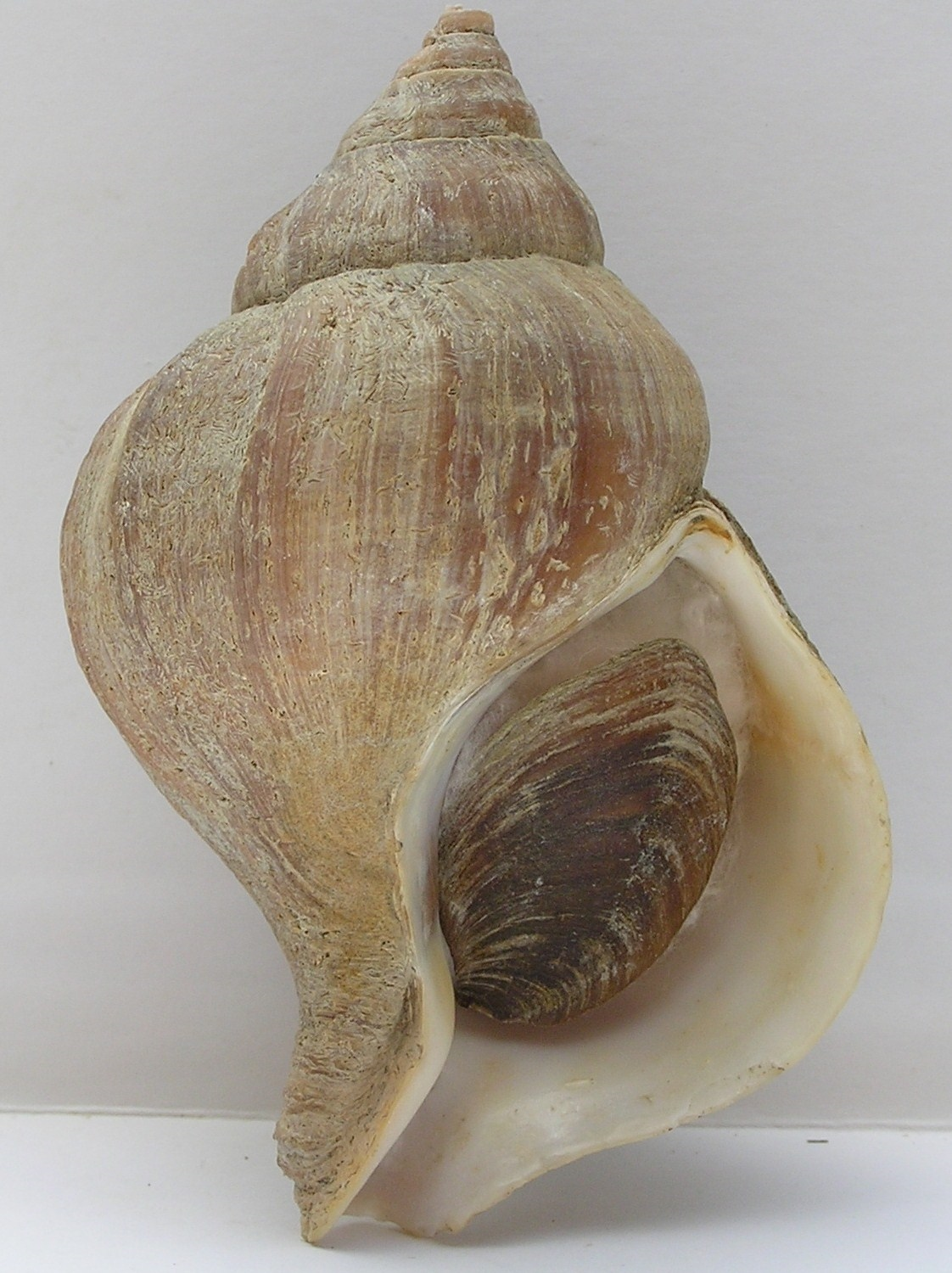
Neptunea beringiana (apertural)

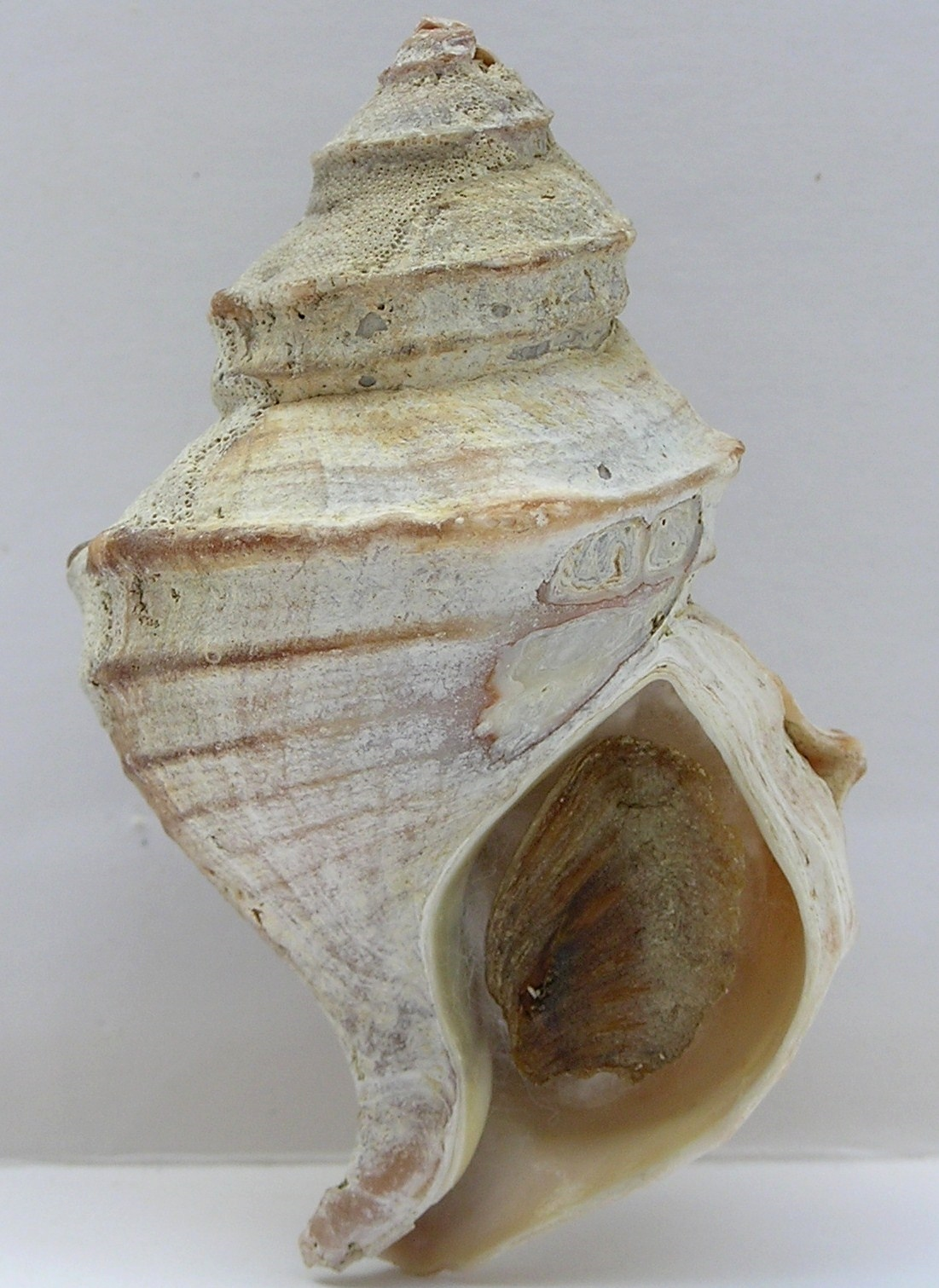
Neptunea communis (apertural)

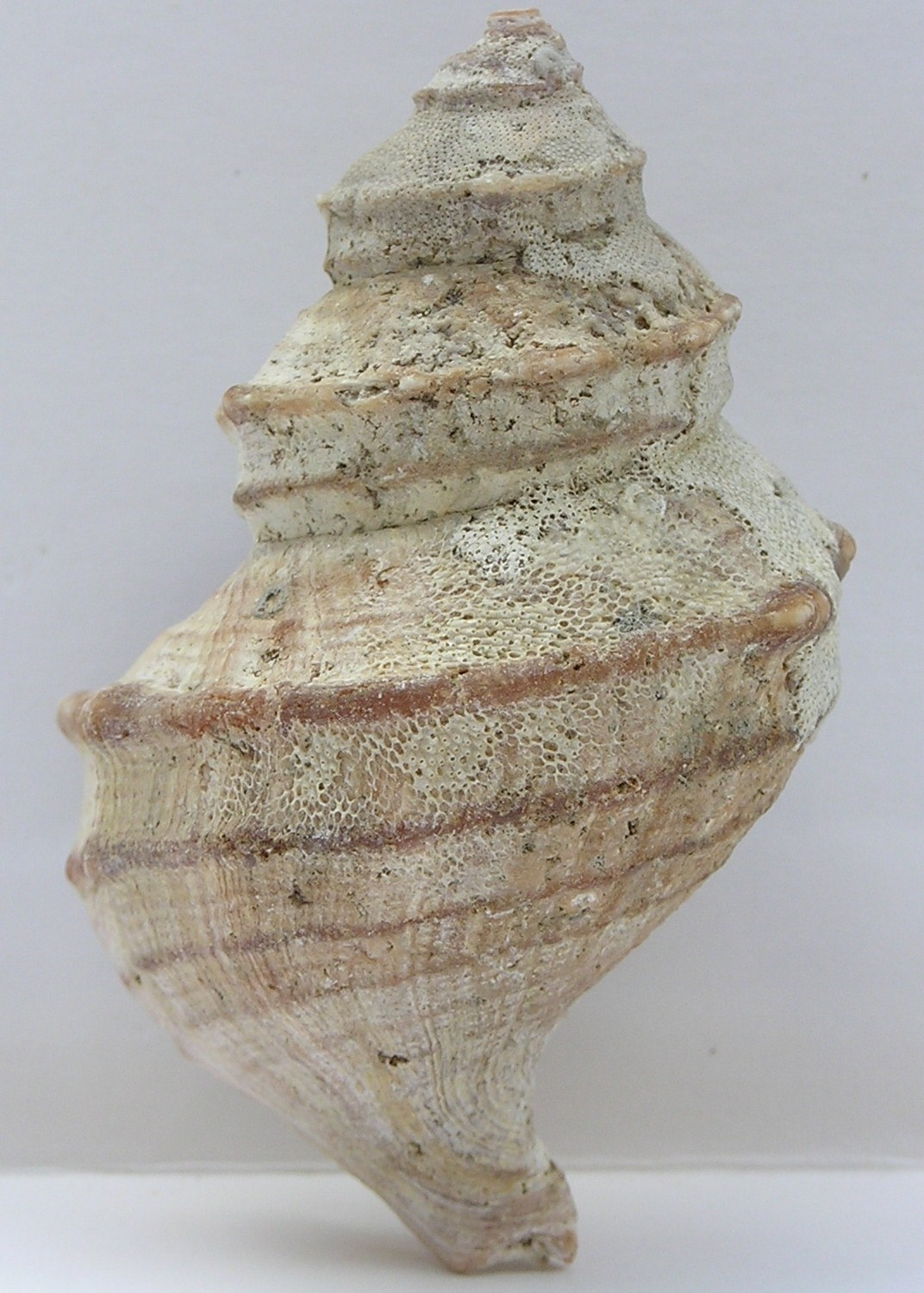
Neptunea communis (dorsal)

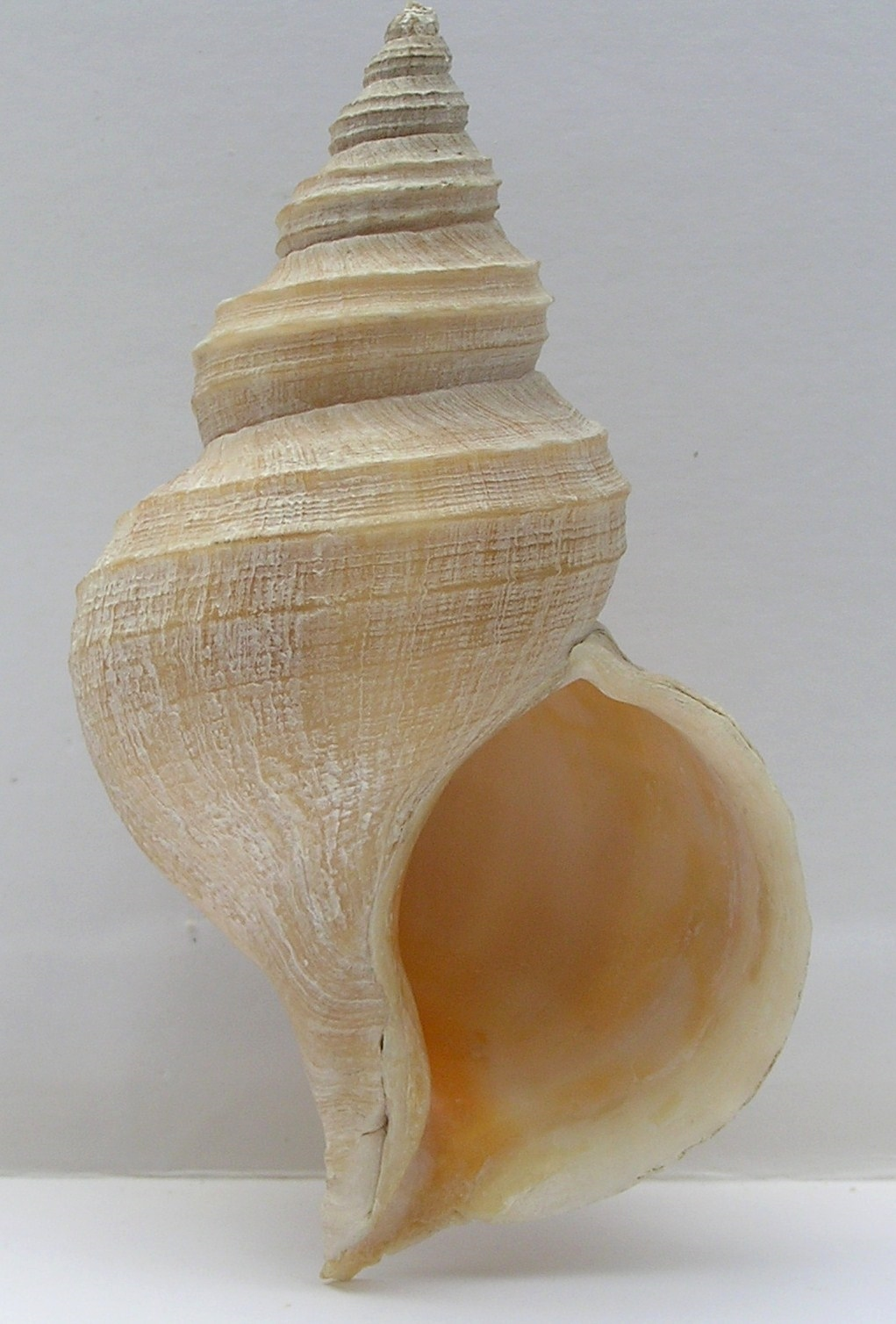
Neptunea despecta (apertural)

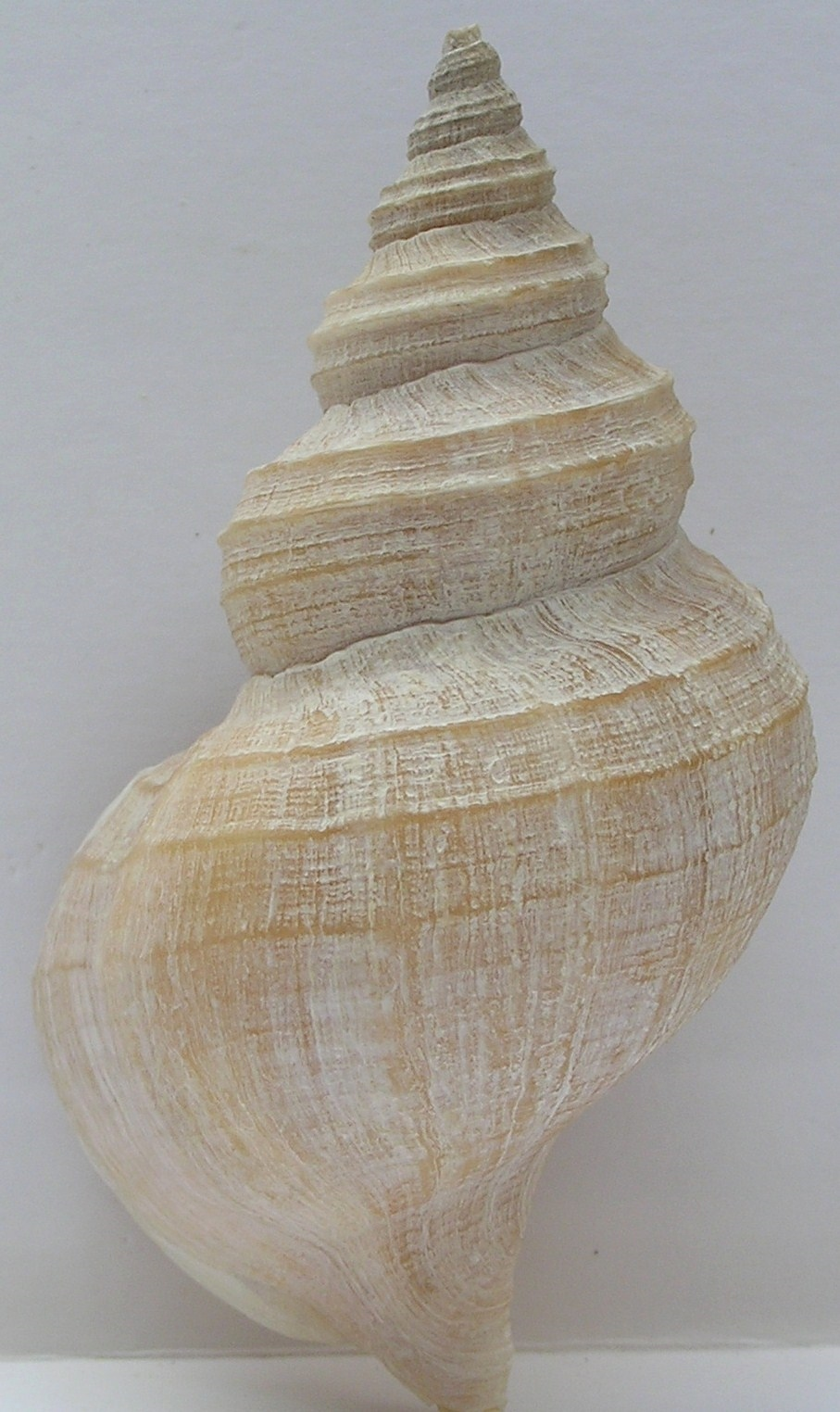
Neptunea despecta (dorsal)

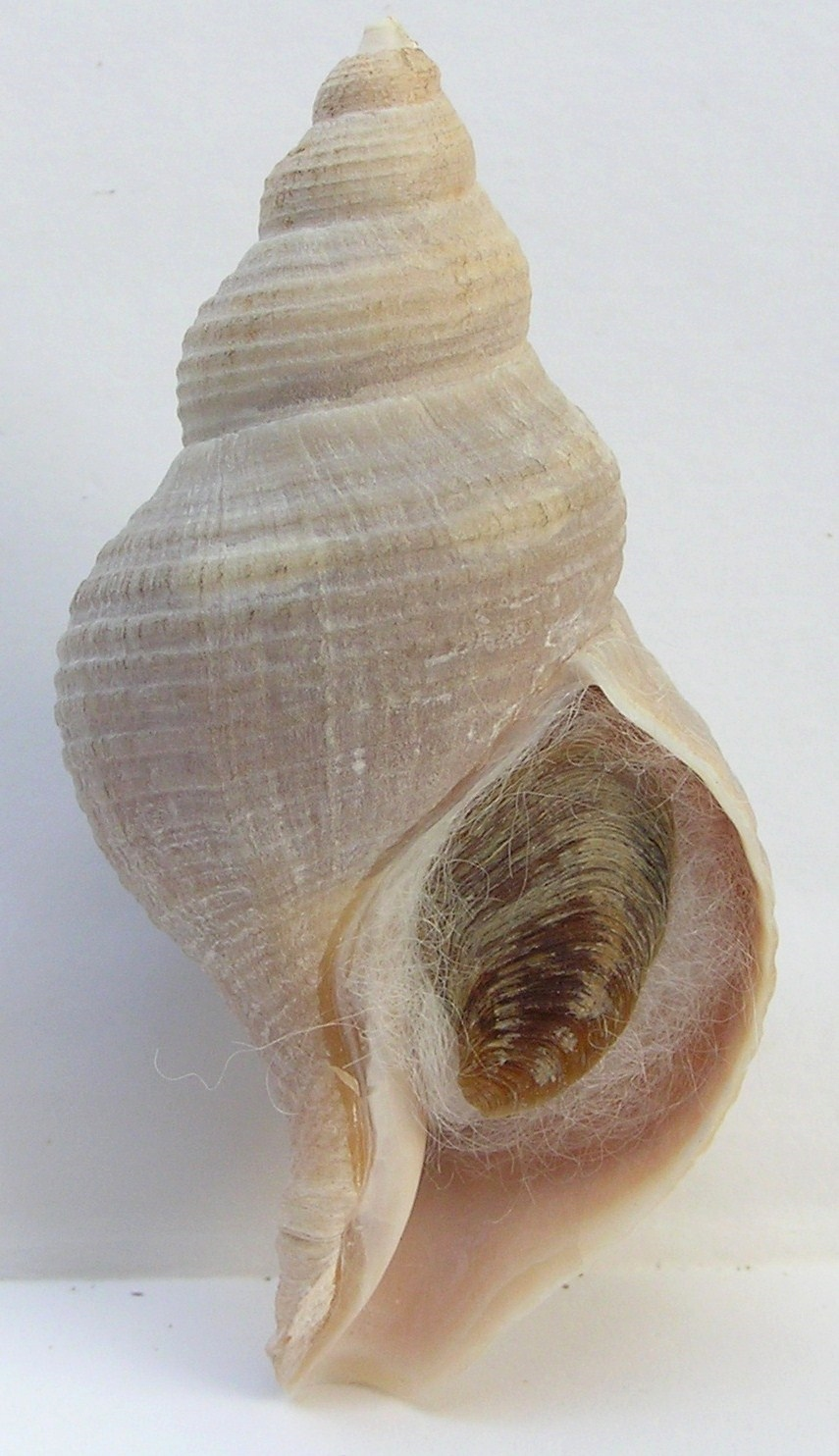
Neptunea ithia (apertural)

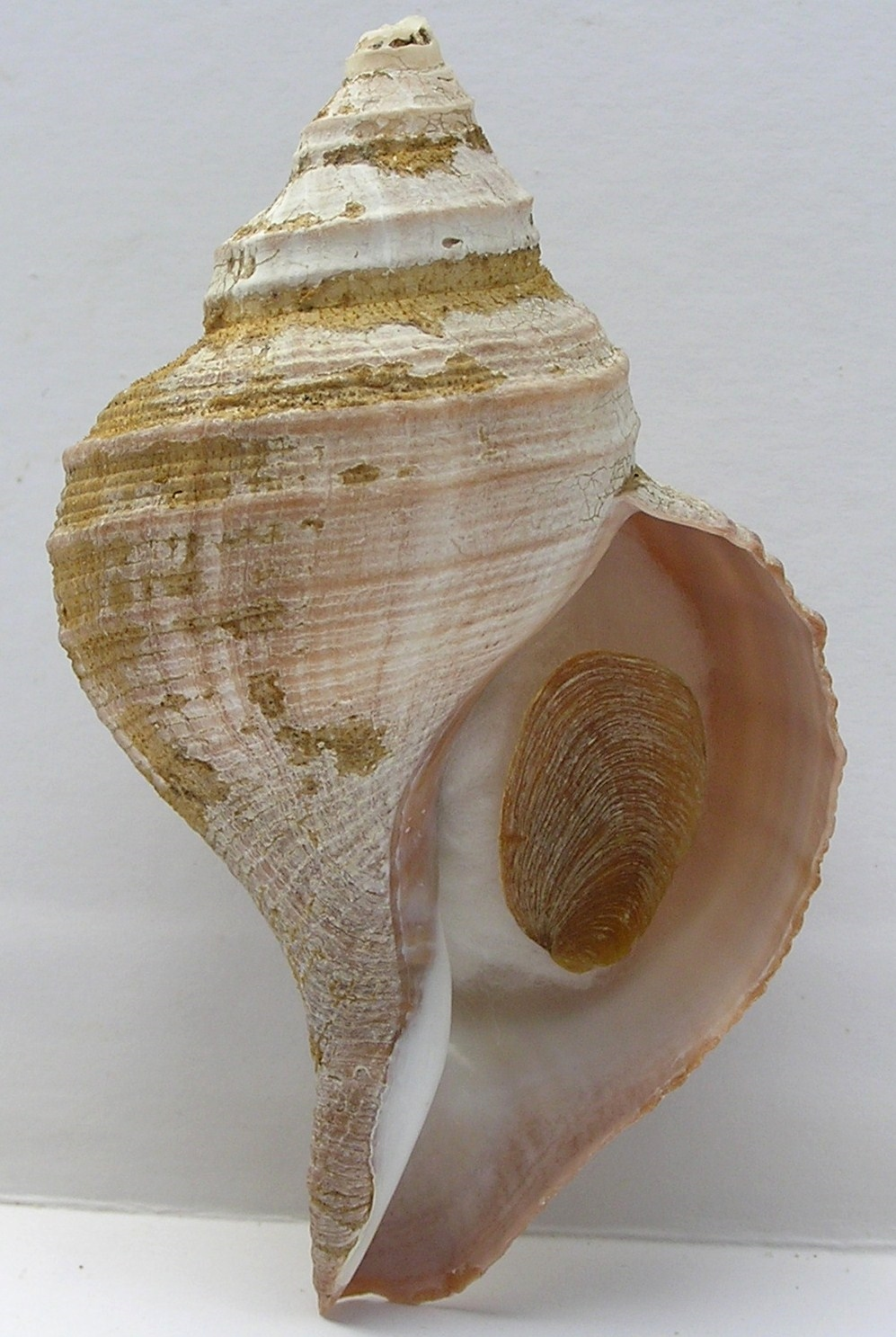
Neptunea laticostata (apertural)

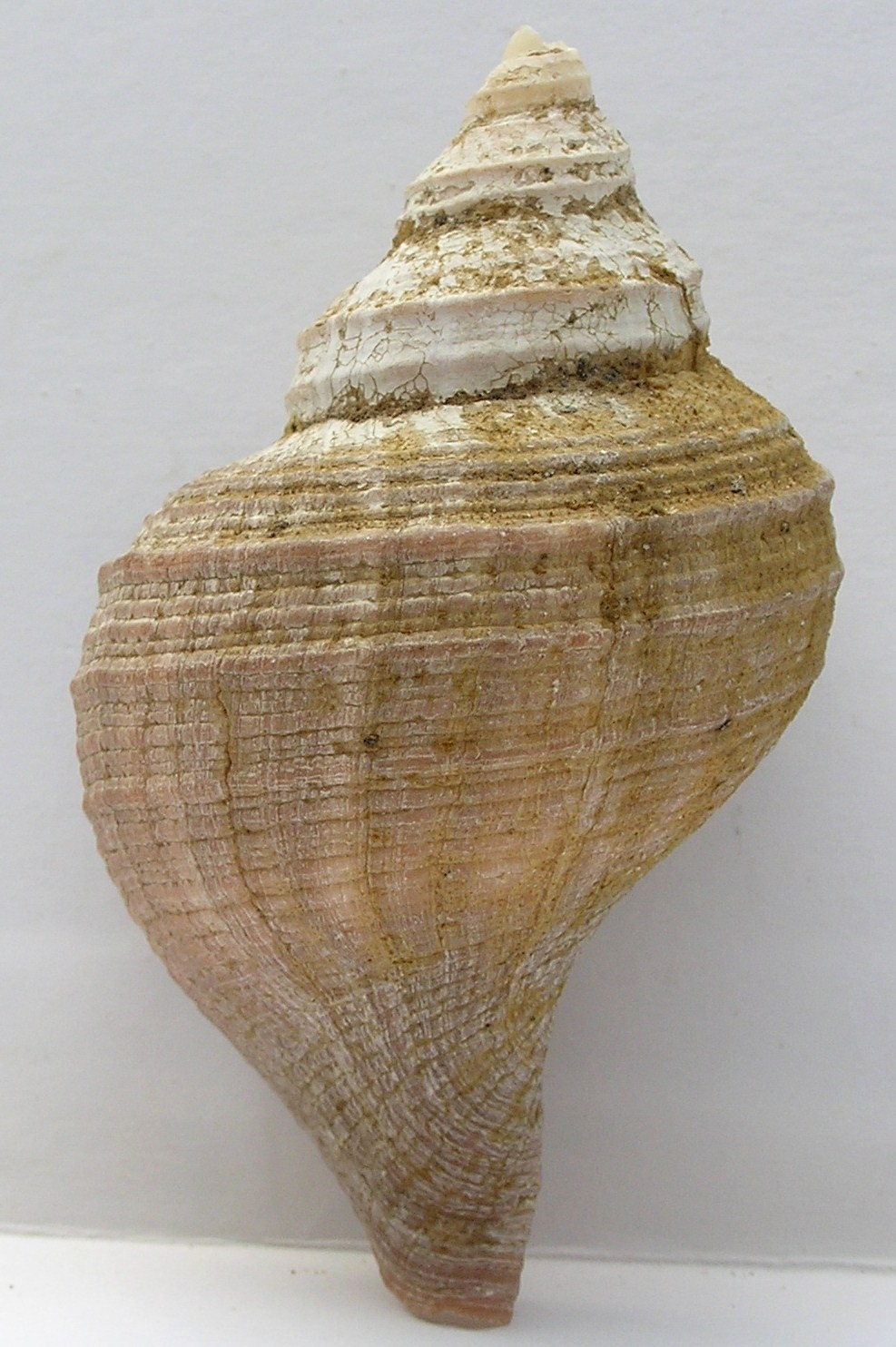
Neptunea laticostata (dorsal)

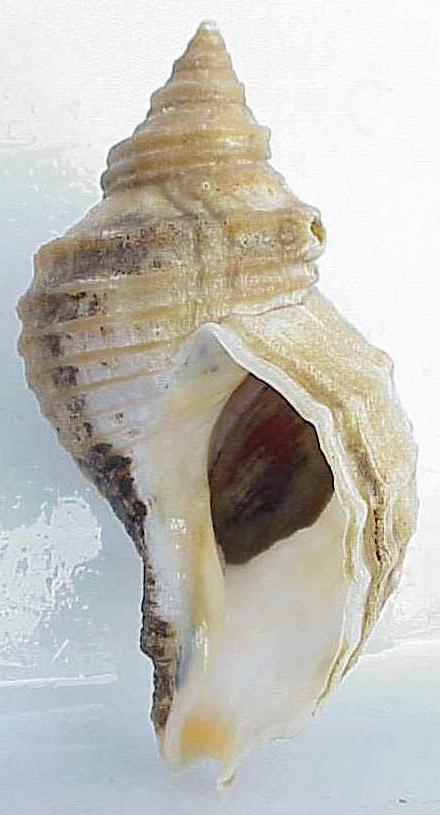
Neptunea lyrata (apertural)

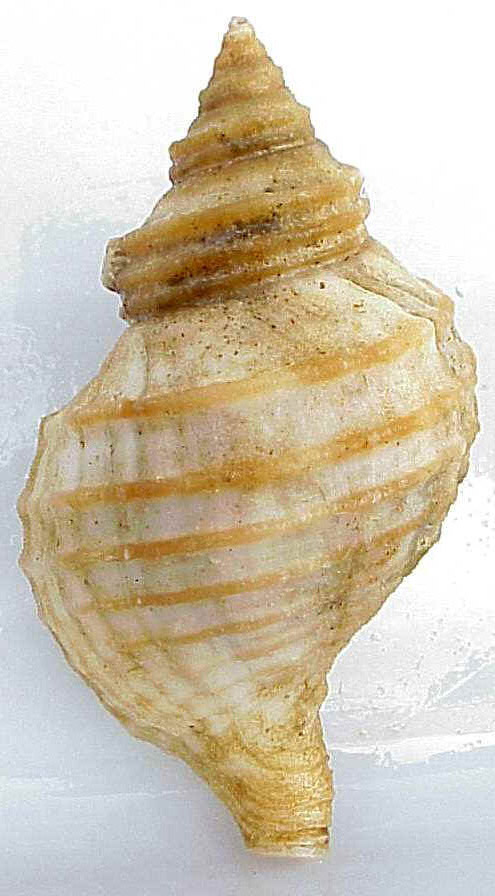
Neptunea lyrata (dorsal)

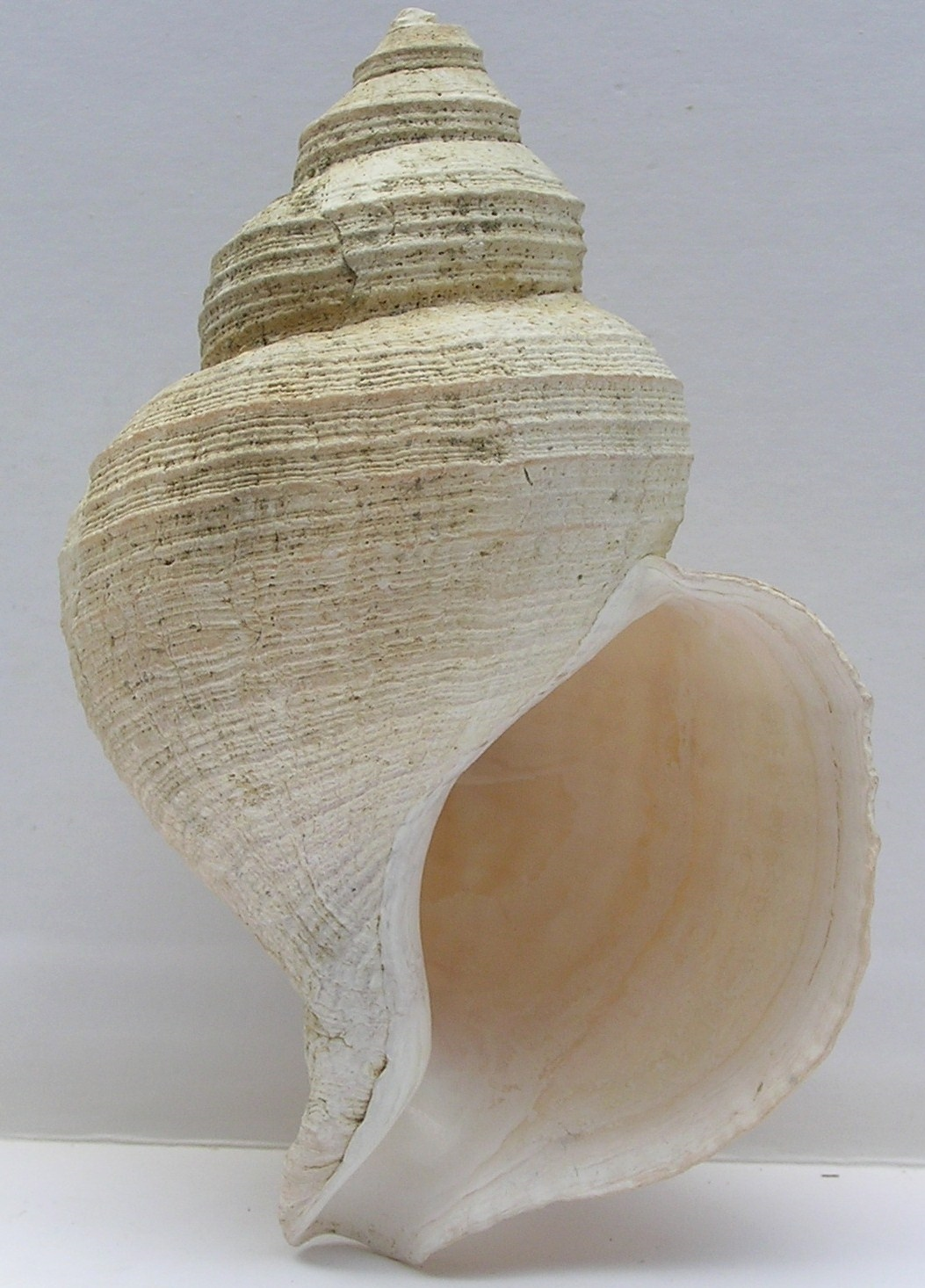
Neptunea pribiloffensis (apertural)

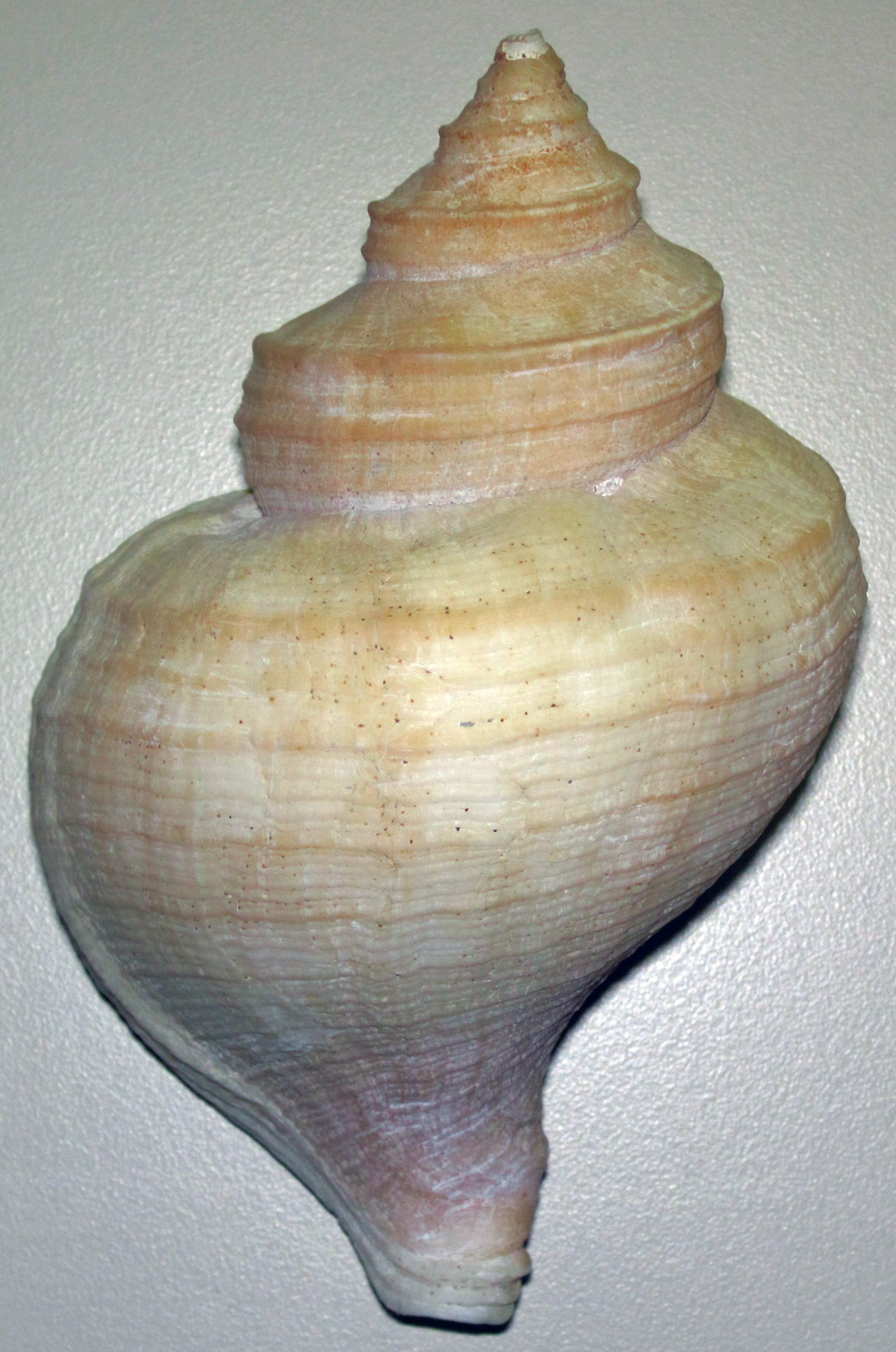
Neptunea pribiloffensis (dorsal)

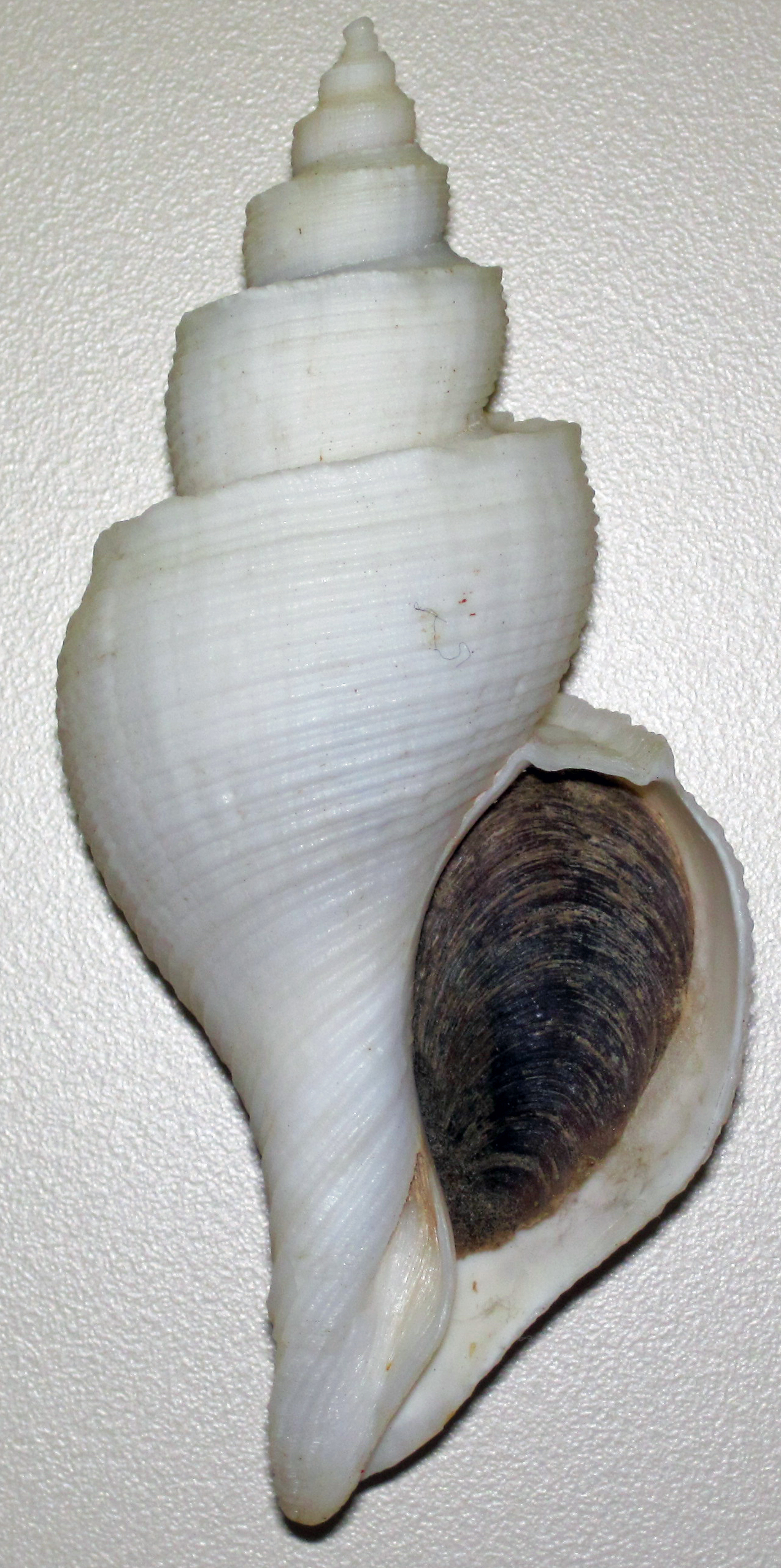
Neptunea tabulata (apertural)

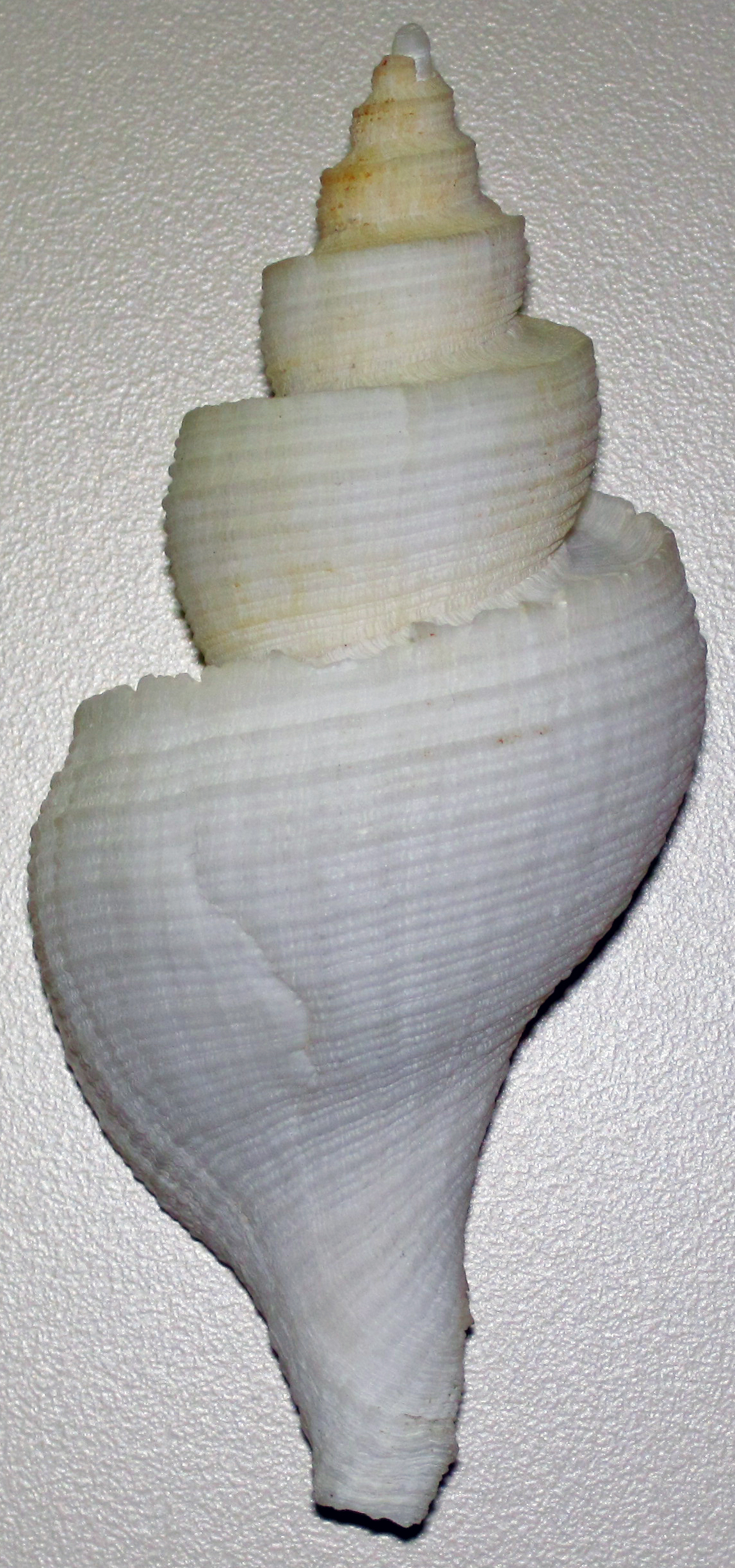
Neptunea tabulata (dorsal)

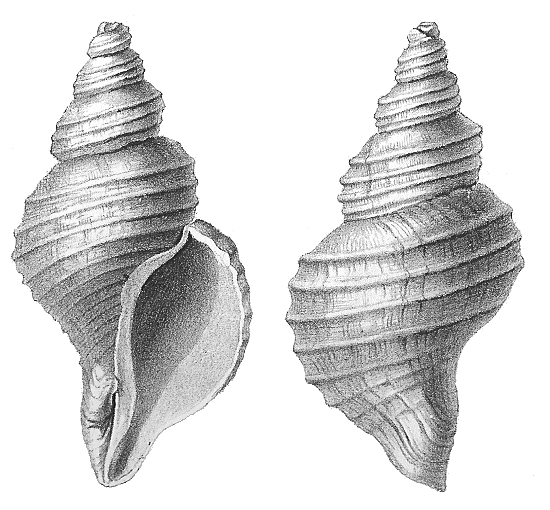
Neptunea despecta
