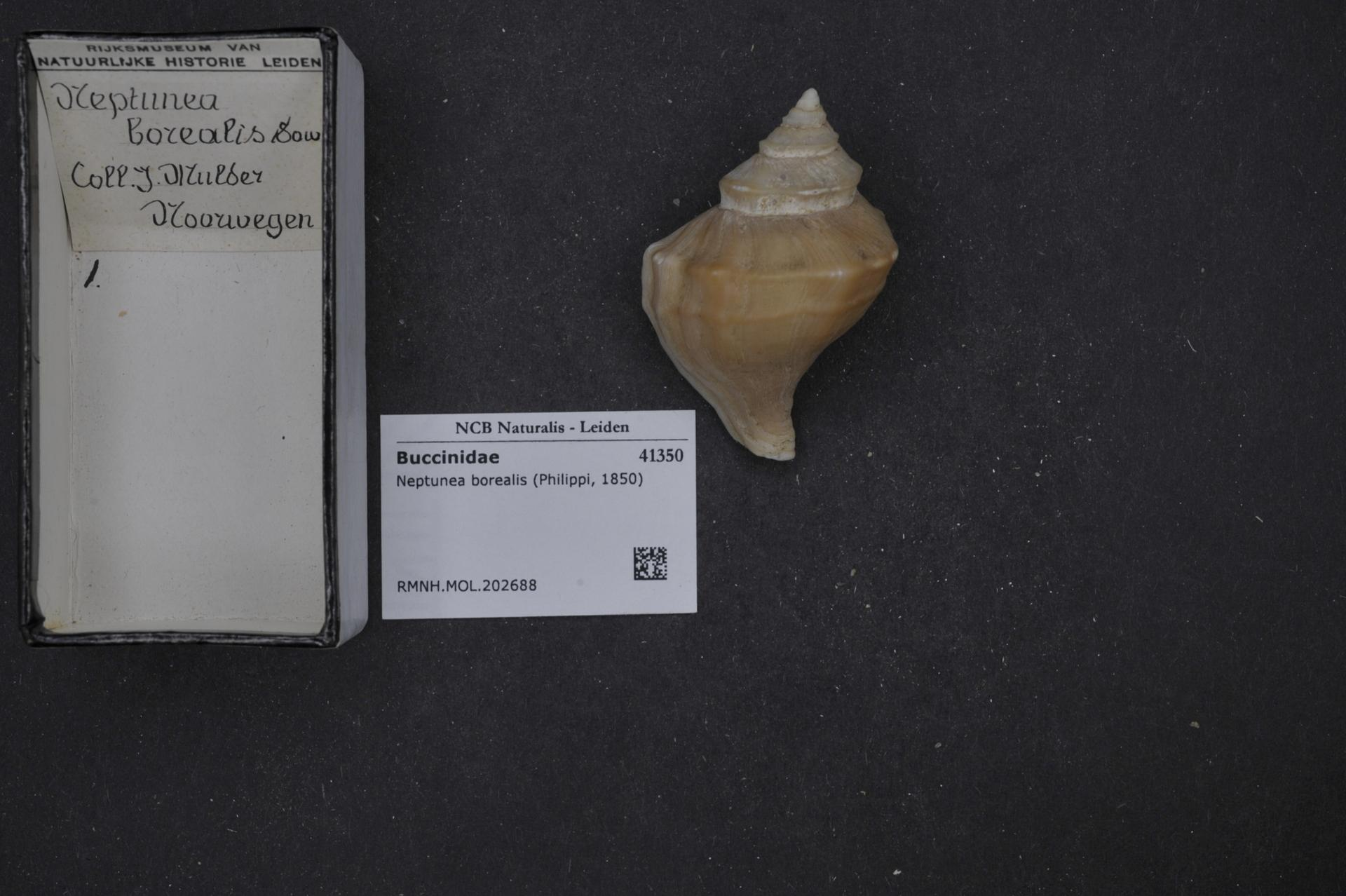

Scientific classification
- Kingdom: Animalia
- Phylum: Mollusca
- Class: Gastropoda
- Subclass: Caenogastropoda
- Order: Neogastropoda
- Family: Buccinidae
- Genus: Neptunea
- Species: N. borealis

Binomial name
- Neptunea borealis (Philippi, 1850)

= Neptunea borealis =

Species of sea snail

Neptunea borealis is a species of sea snail, a marine gastropod mollusk in the family Buccinidae, the true whelks.
