= Neptunea occaecata =

Scientific classification
- Kingdom: Animalia
- Phylum: Mollusca
- Class: Gastropoda
- Subclass: Caenogastropoda
- Order: Neogastropoda
- Family: Buccinidae
- Genus: Neptunea
- Species: N. occaecata

Binomial name
- Neptunea occaecata Fraussen & Terryn, 2007

Species of gastropod

Neptunea occaecata is a species of sea snail, a marine gastropod mollusk in the family Buccinidae, the true whelks.

== Description ==
This deepwater species attains a size of 70 to 180 mm.

== Distribution ==
This species occurs in the North-west Pacific Ocean around the Kamchatka area, and is trawled at depths between 180-200m.
