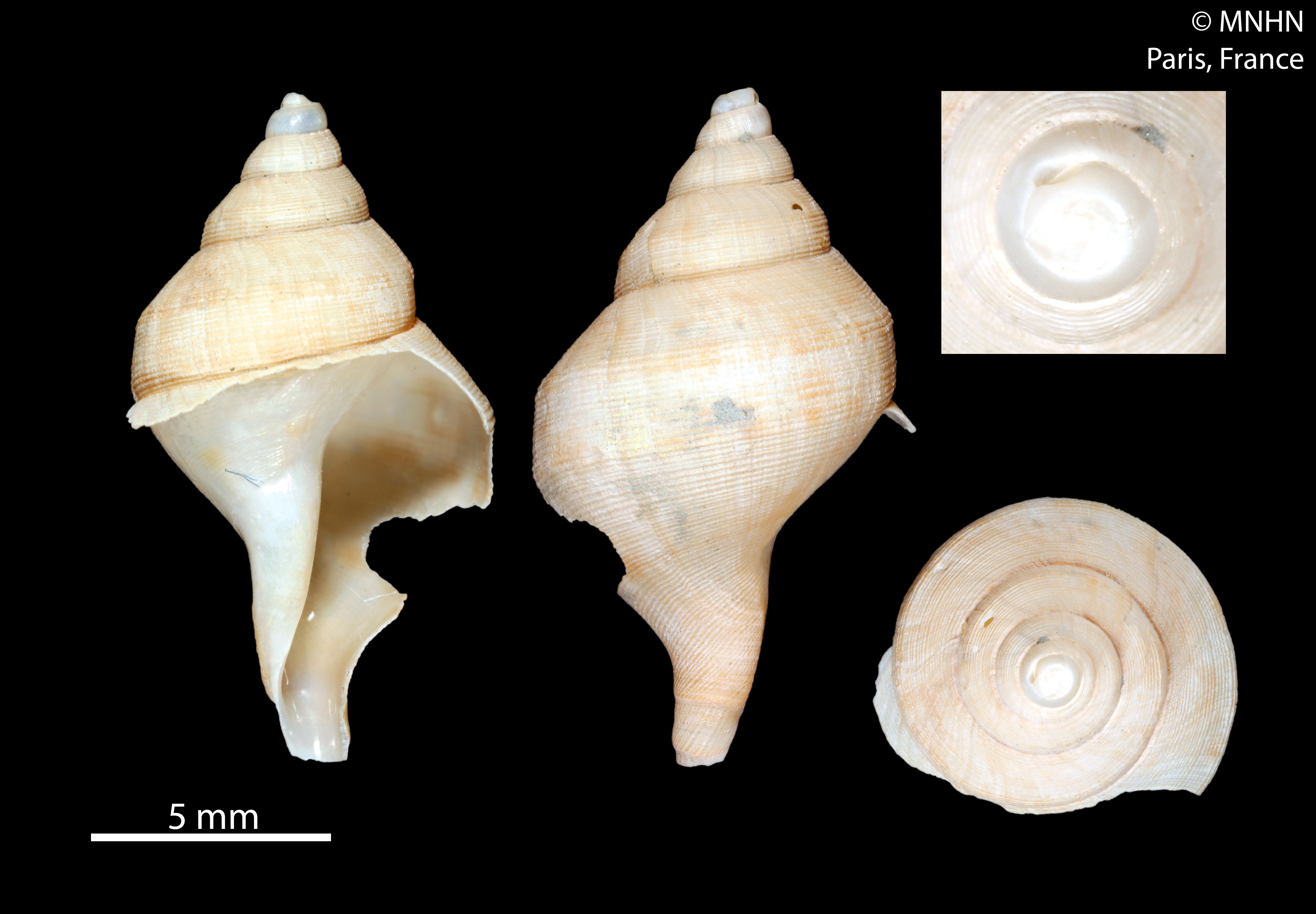
- Shell of Buccinum yadai

Scientific classification
- Kingdom: Animalia
- Phylum: Mollusca
- Class: Gastropoda
- Subclass: Caenogastropoda
- Order: Neogastropoda
- Superfamily: Buccinoidea
- Family: Buccinidae
- Genus: Bathybuccinum; Golikov & Sirenko, 1989

Type species
- Bathybuccinum bicordatum Golikov & Sirenko, 1988

= Bathybuccinum =

Genus of gastropods

Bathybuccinum is a genus of sea snails, marine gastropod mollusks in the family Buccinidae, the true whelks.

In 2022 this genus was redescribed as a synonym of the family Buccinum Lineaus, 1758

== Species ==
Species within the genus Bathybuccinum include:

- Bathybuccinum bicordatum Golikov & Sirenko, 1988: synonym of Buccinum bicordatum (A. N. Golikov & Sirenko, 1988) (superseded combination)
- Bathybuccinum clarki Kantor & Harasewych, 1998: synonym of Aleutibuccinum clarki (Kantor & Harasewych, 1998) (superseded combination)
- Bathybuccinum higuchii Fraussen & Chino, 2009: synonym of Buccinum higuchii (Fraussen & Chino, 2009) (original combination)
- Bathybuccinum unicordatum Golikov & Sirenko, 1988: synonym of Buccinum unicordatum (A. N. Golikov & Sirenko, 1988) (superseded combination)
- [Bathybuccinum yadai Fraussen & Chino, 2009: synonym of Buccinum yadai (Fraussen & Chino, 2009) (original combination)
