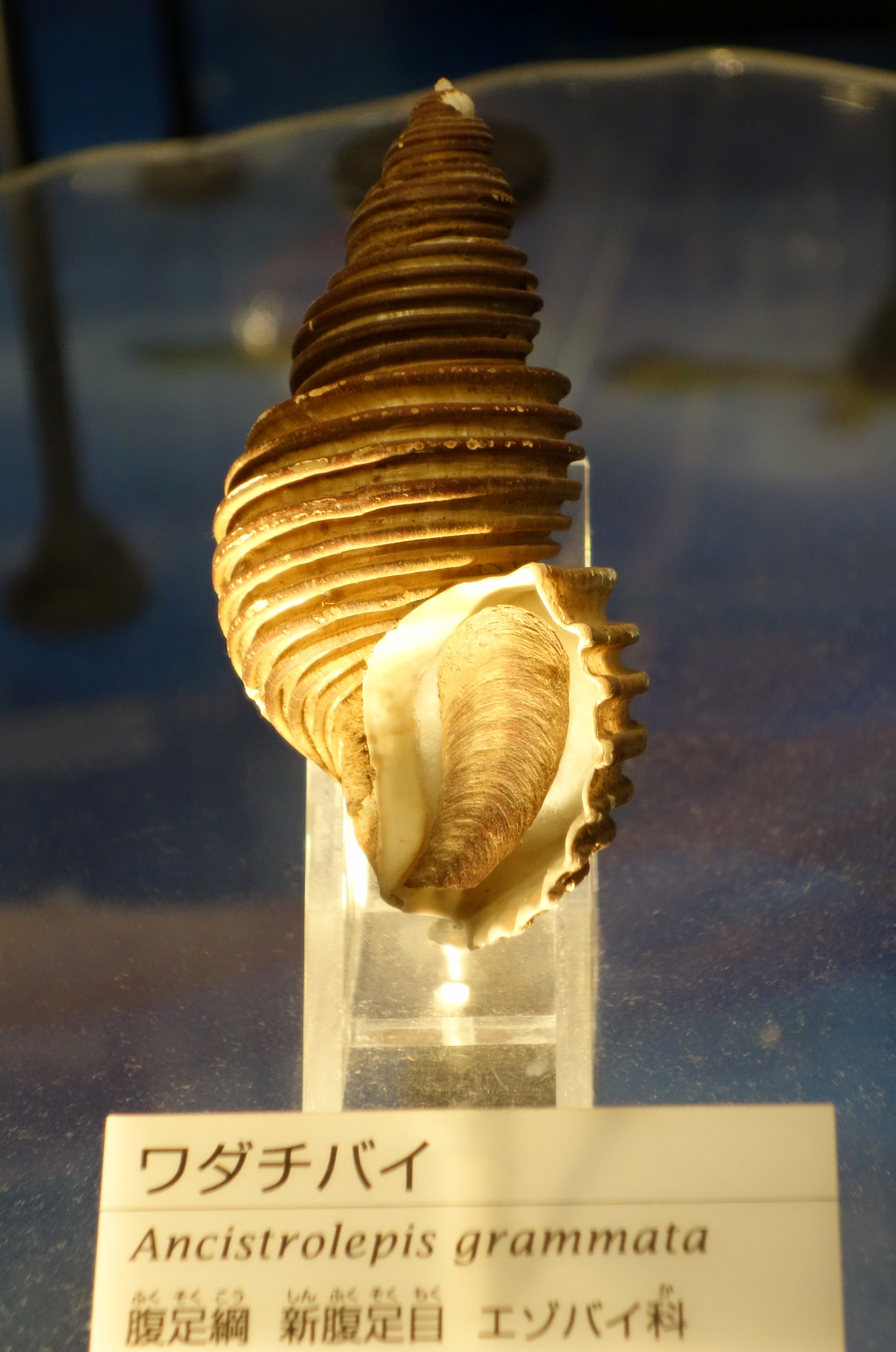
- Ancistrolepis grammatus shell and operculum

Scientific classification
- Kingdom: Animalia
- Phylum: Mollusca
- Class: Gastropoda
- Subclass: Caenogastropoda
- Order: Neogastropoda
- Family: Buccinidae
- Subfamily: Parancistrolepidinae
- Genus: Ancistrolepis; Dall, 1894

Synonyms
- Chrysodomus (Ancistrolepis) Dall, 1895

= Ancistrolepis =

Genus of whelk

Ancistrolepis is a genus of sea snails, marine gastropod molluscs in the family Buccinidae, the true whelks.

== Species ==
Species within the genus Ancistrolepis include:

- Ancistrolepis californicus Dall, 1919
- Ancistrolepis eucosmius (Dall, 1891)
- Ancistrolepis grammatus (Dall, 1907)
- Ancistrolepis hikidai Kuroda, 1944
- Ancistrolepis kawamurai Habe & Ito, 1972
- Ancistrolepis okhotensis Dall, 1925
- Ancistrolepis vietnamensis Sirenko & Goryachev, 1990

Subgenera formerly placed in Ancistrolepis:

- Ancistrolepis (Clinopegma) elevated to Clinopegma Grant & Gale, 1931
- Ancistrolepis (Japelion) elevated to Japelion Dall, 1916

Species formerly placed in Ancistrolepis:

- Ancistrolepis beringianus is a synonym of Neancistrolepis beringianus (Dall, 1919)
- Ancistrolepis damon is a synonym of Clinopegma magnum damon (Dall, 1907)
- Ancistrolepis decora is a synonym of Clinopegma decora (Dall, 1925)
- Ancistrolepis (Clinopegma) decora is a synonym of Clinopegma decora (Dall, 1925)
- Ancistrolepis fujitai is a synonym of Parancistrolepis fujitai (Kuroda, 1931)
- Ancistrolepis hiranoi is a synonym of Parancistrolepis fujitai (Kuroda, 1931)
- Ancistrolepis latus is a synonym of Japelion latus (Dall, 1918)
- Ancistrolepis magna is a synonym of Clinopegma magnum (Dall, 1895)
- Ancistrolepis sasakii is a synonym of Clinopegma sasakii Habe & Ito, 1970
- Ancistrolepis trochoideus is a synonym of Bathyancistrolepis trochoideus (Dall, 1907)
