= Volutharpa nipponkaiensis =

Scientific classification
- Kingdom: Animalia
- Phylum: Mollusca
- Class: Gastropoda
- Subclass: Caenogastropoda
- Order: Neogastropoda
- Superfamily: Buccinoidea
- Family: Buccinidae
- Genus: Volutharpa
- Species: V. nipponkaiensis

Binomial name
- Volutharpa nipponkaiensis Habe & Ki. Ito, 1980

Synonyms
- Volutharpa ampullacea nipponkaiensis Habe & Ki. Ito, 1980

Species of gastropod

Volutharpa nipponkaiensis is a species of sea snail, a marine gastropod mollusk in the family Buccinidae, the true whelks.

Subspecies

- Volutharpa nipponkaiensis lymnaeformis Habe & Ki. Ito, 1980
- Volutharpa nipponkaiensis nipponkaiensis Habe & Ki. Ito, 1980

== Description ==
The length of the shell attains 34 mm.

== Distribution ==
This marine species occurs off Japan.
