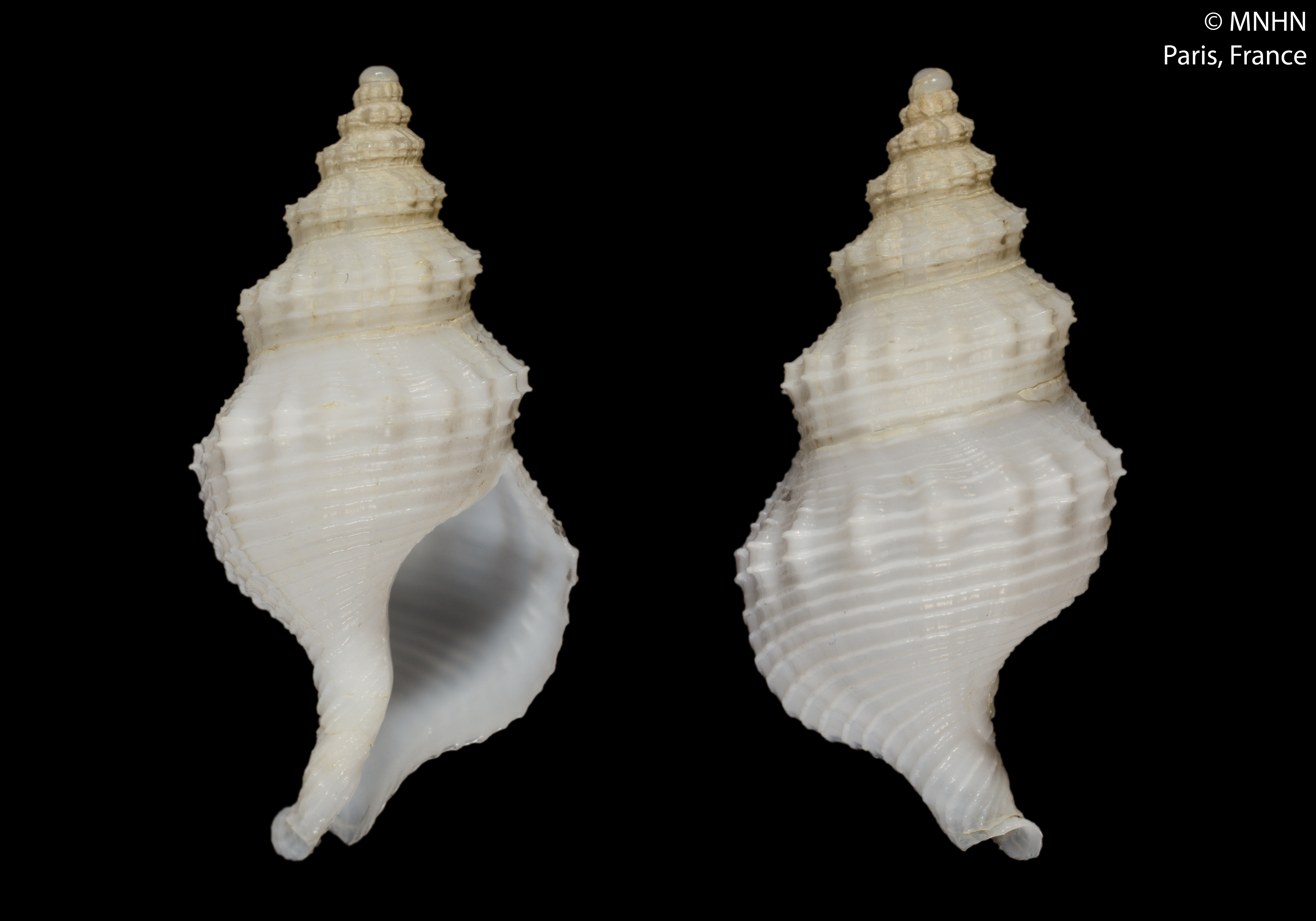
- Shell of Phaenomenella cirsiumoides (holotype at MNHN, Paris)

Scientific classification
- Kingdom: Animalia
- Phylum: Mollusca
- Class: Gastropoda
- Subclass: Caenogastropoda
- Order: Neogastropoda
- Family: Buccinidae
- Genus: Phaenomenella
- Species: P. cirsiumoides

Binomial name
- Phaenomenella cirsiumoides (Fraussen, 2004)

Synonyms
- Nassaria cirsiumoides Fraussen, 2004 (original combination)

= Phaenomenella cirsiumoides =

Species of gastropod

Phaenomenella cirsiumoides is a species of sea snail, a marine gastropod mollusc in the family Buccinidae, the true whelks.

== Description ==
The length of the shell attains 30.6 mm.

== Distribution ==
This species occurs in the South China Sea and off Japan.
