= Pararetifusus =

Scientific classification
- Kingdom: Animalia
- Phylum: Mollusca
- Class: Gastropoda
- Subclass: Caenogastropoda
- Order: Neogastropoda
- Family: Buccinidae
- Subfamily: Siphonaliinae
- Genus: Pararetifusus; Kosuge, 1967

Type species
- Phymorhynchus tenuis Okutani, 1966

Genus of gastropods

Pararetifusus is a genus of sea snails, marine gastropod molluscs in the family Buccinidae, the true whelks.

== Species ==
Species within the genus Pararetifusus include:

- Pararetifusus carinatus (Ponder, 1970)
- Pararetifusus kantori (Kosyan, 2006)
- Pararetifusus kosugei (Kosyan, 2006)
- Pararetifusus tenuis (Okutani, 1966)

Species brought into synonymy

- Pararetifusus dedonderi Fraussen & Hadorn, 2001: synonym of Eclectofusus dedonderi (Fraussen & Hadorn, 2001)
- Pararetifusus sapius (Dall, 1919): synonym of Fusipagoda sapia (Dall, 1919)
