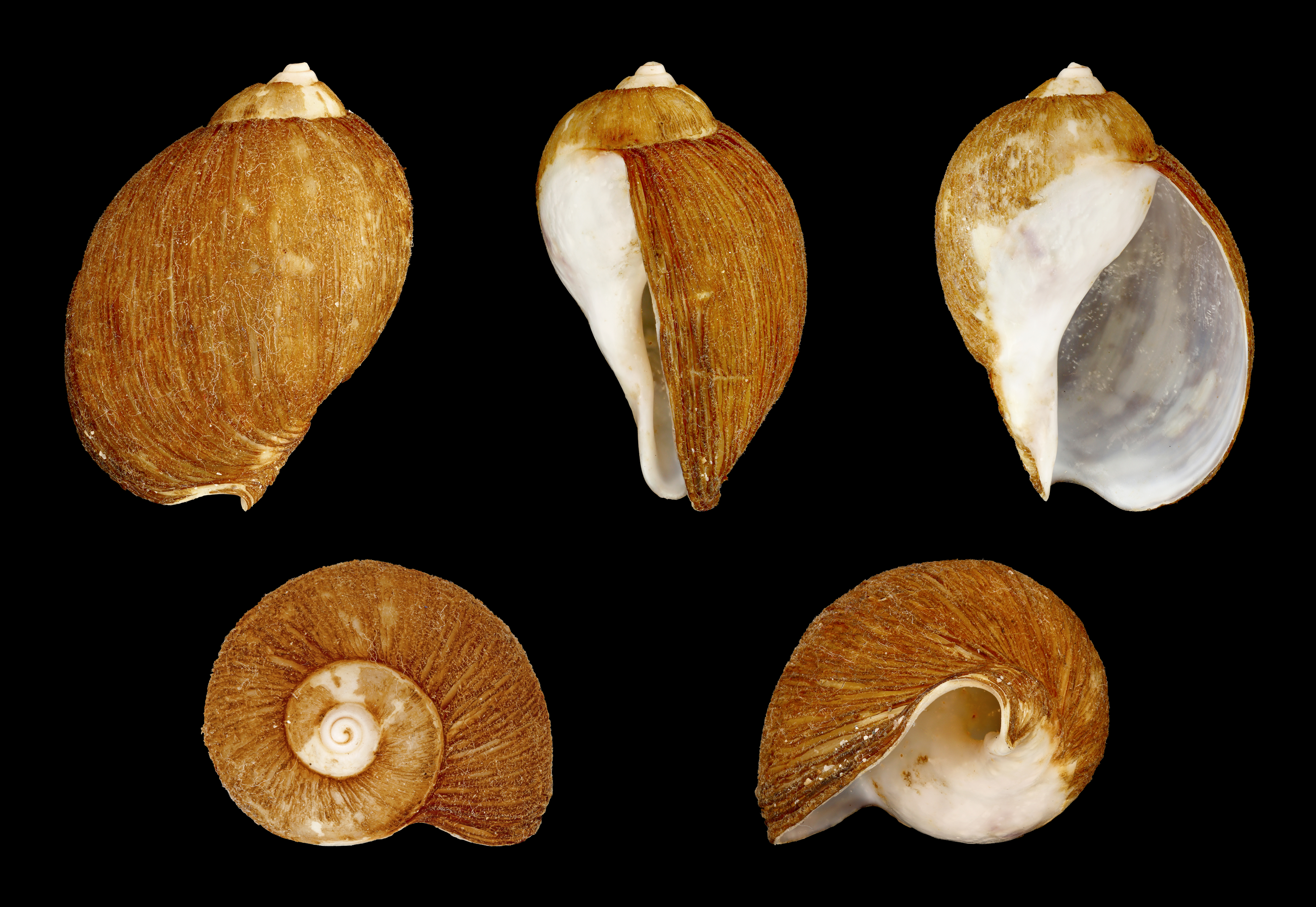
- Volutharpa perryi

Scientific classification
- Kingdom: Animalia
- Phylum: Mollusca
- Class: Gastropoda
- Subclass: Caenogastropoda
- Order: Neogastropoda
- Family: Buccinidae
- Genus: Volutharpa

Species
- See text

= Volutharpa =

Genus of gastropods

Volutharpa is a genus of sea snails, marine gastropod mollusks in the family Buccinidae, the true whelks.

== Description ==
The thin shell is ventricose, thin. The spire is short. The body whorl and the aperture are very large. The operculum is usually wanting, but, when present, at first with apical nucleus, afterwards becoming annular.

(Described as Pseudobuccinum) The thin shell is oval and ventricose. The spire is very short. The body whorls is large, not produced below. The aperture is large, terminating below in a rounded sinus. The outer lip is thin and simple. The inner lip is very thin, smooth, and closely and very broadly folded upon the imperforate umbilical region and body whorl above, so as to form, with a low revolving umbilical ridge, a kind of profoundly arcuate, strongly spiral, false columella. The surface shows more or less distinct revolving lines and furrows.

This genus differs in its simple foot and in possessing eyes as well as in dentition. The form and porcellaneous texture of the shell are like Bullia, and serve to separate it from Buccinum.

The animal is like Buccinum, of a white color sparsely sprinkled with black on the head, foot and siphon; the tentacles are broad, close together at the base, and rather short, with the eyes on the outer side, near the middle; the siphon is thick and short, and the foot is fleshy and simple behind.

== Distribution ==
This genus is confined in distribution to the North Pacific Ocean, mainly off Japan and Alaska.

Fossils have been found in Pliocene and Quaternary strata of Japan and in Quaternary strata of California, USA.

== Species ==
- Volutharpa ampullacea (Middendorff, 1848)
- Volutharpa nipponkaiensis Habe & Ki. Ito, 1980
- Volutharpa perryi (Jay, 1857)

Synonyms

- Volutharpa ainos Kuroda & Kinoshita, 1956: synonym of Volutharpa perryi ainos Kuroda & Kinoshita, 1956
- Volutharpa deshayesiana P. Fischer, 1856: synonym of Volutharpa ampullacea (Middendorff, 1848)
- Volutharpa fischeriana A. Adams, 1870: synonym of Volutharpa perryi (Jay, 1857)
- Volutharpa limnaeana A. Adams, 1860 (nomen nudum)
- Volutharpa morchiana P. Fischer, 1859: synonym of Buccinum baerii (Middendorff, 1848)
- Volutharpa paulucciana Tapparone Canefri, 1882: synonym of Volutharpa perryi (Jay, 1857)
- Volutharpa salmiana Rolle, 1892: synonym of Volutharpa perryi (Jay, 1857)
