= Lussivolutopsius limatus =

Scientific classification
- Kingdom: Animalia
- Phylum: Mollusca
- Class: Gastropoda
- Subclass: Caenogastropoda
- Order: Neogastropoda
- Family: Buccinidae
- Genus: Lussivolutopsius
- Species: L. limatus

Binomial name
- Lussivolutopsius limatus Dall, 1907

Species of gastropod

Lussivolutopsius limatus is a species of sea snail, a marine gastropod mollusc in the family Buccinidae, the true whelks.
