= Pararetifusus kosugei =

Scientific classification
- Kingdom: Animalia
- Phylum: Mollusca
- Class: Gastropoda
- Subclass: Caenogastropoda
- Order: Neogastropoda
- Family: Buccinidae
- Genus: Pararetifusus
- Species: P. kosugei

Binomial name
- Pararetifusus kosugei Kosyan, 2006

Species of gastropod

Pararetifusus kosugei is a species of sea snail, a marine gastropod mollusk in the family Buccinidae, the true whelks.
