= Lussivolutopsius hydractiniferus =

Scientific classification
- Kingdom: Animalia
- Phylum: Mollusca
- Class: Gastropoda
- Subclass: Caenogastropoda
- Order: Neogastropoda
- Family: Buccinidae
- Genus: Lussivolutopsius
- Species: L. hydractiniferus

Binomial name
- Lussivolutopsius hydractiniferus Kantor, 1983

Species of gastropod

Lussivolutopsius hydractiniferus is a species of sea snail, a marine gastropod mollusc in the family Buccinidae, the true whelks.
