= Lussivolutopsius furukawai =

Scientific classification
- Domain: Eukaryota
- Kingdom: Animalia
- Phylum: Mollusca
- Class: Gastropoda
- Subclass: Caenogastropoda
- Order: Neogastropoda
- Family: Buccinidae
- Genus: Lussivolutopsius
- Species: L. furukawai

Binomial name
- Lussivolutopsius furukawai (Oyama, 1951)

Species of gastropod

Lussivolutopsius furukawai is a species of Buccinidae. The species is distributed in the Sea of Okhotsk. The species was first described by Katsura Ōyama in 1951. The species feeds on clams, is found at depths of 4–62 meters, and is generally found in sand.
