= Lussivolutopsius memmi =

Scientific classification
- Kingdom: Animalia
- Phylum: Mollusca
- Class: Gastropoda
- Subclass: Caenogastropoda
- Order: Neogastropoda
- Family: Buccinidae
- Genus: Lussivolutopsius
- Species: L. memmi

Binomial name
- Lussivolutopsius memmi Kantor, 1990

Species of gastropod

Lussivolutopsius memmi is a species of sea snail, a marine gastropod mollusc in the family Buccinidae, the true whelks.

== Description ==
This operculated species attains a size of 135 mm.

== Distribution ==
Western Pacific Ocean: Sea of Okhotsk.

== Habitat ==
Rarely trawled at 1,200 metres depth.
