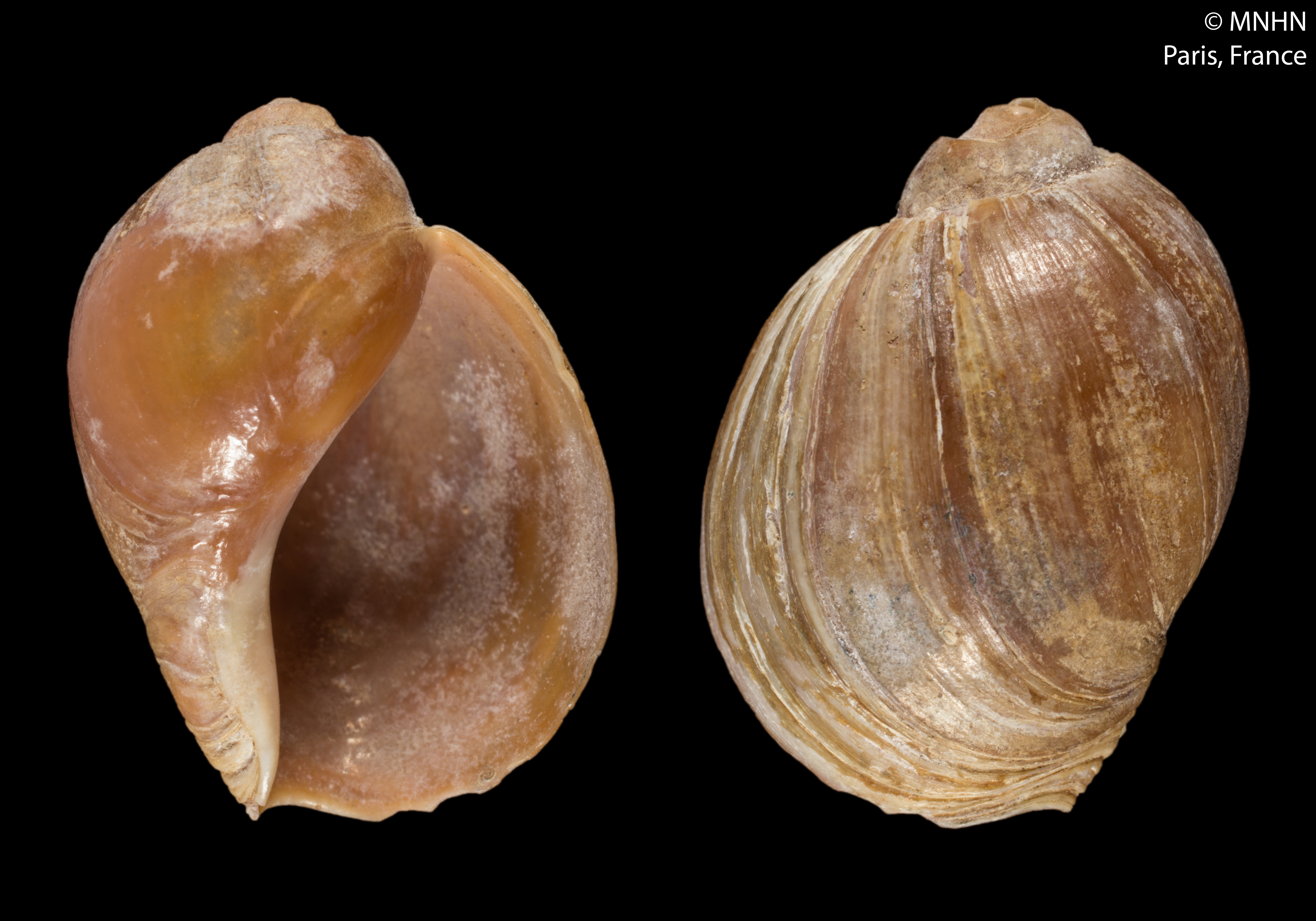
- Shell of Volutharpa ampullacea (syntype at MNHN, Paris)

Scientific classification
- Kingdom: Animalia
- Phylum: Mollusca
- Class: Gastropoda
- Subclass: Caenogastropoda
- Order: Neogastropoda
- Superfamily: Buccinoidea
- Family: Buccinidae
- Genus: Volutharpa
- Species: V. ampullacea

Binomial name
- Volutharpa ampullacea (Middendorff, 1848)

Synonyms
- Buccinum (Volutharpa) ampullaceum (Middendorff, 1848) superseded combination; Buccinum ampullaceum (Middendorff, 1848); Bullia ampullacea Middendorff, 1848 (original combination); Tritonium (Volutharpa) ampullacea (Middendorff, 1848) superseded combination; Volutharpa deshayesiana P. Fischer, 1856 ·

= Volutharpa ampullacea =

Species of gastropod

Volutharpa ampullacea is a species of sea snail, a marine gastropod mollusk in the family Buccinidae, the true whelks.

Subspecies

- Volutharpa ampullacea lymnaeformis Habe & Ki. Ito, 1980: synonym of Buccinum nipponkaiense lymnaeforme (Habe & Ki. Ito, 1980) (basionym)
- Volutharpa ampullacea nipponkaiensis Habe & Ki. Ito, 1980: synonym of Buccinum nipponkaiense (Habe & Ki. Ito, 1980): synonym of Volutharpa nipponkaiensis nipponkaiensis Habe & Ki. Ito, 1980 (basionym)
- Volutharpa ampullacea perryi (Jay, 1857): synonym of Volutharpa perryi (Jay, 1857)

== Description ==
The length of the shell varies between 30 mm and 61.7 mm.

The shell is reddish brown under a rufous or yellowish epidermis.

G.W. Tryon notes the following:

About the Volutharpa ampulacea, a very remarkable fact may be mentioned. The majority of the individuals are without opercula, even without a trace of the pad-like gland or area from which the operculum is secreted. About ten percent, of the individuals of the var. acuminata I have examined had traces of this gland or area, marked by its smooth and rather whitish surface on the granulous dark slate-colored foot. About fifteen percent had well-developed opercula in the proper position. I have ascertained the same to be the case about the typical form, from alcoholic specimens, collected by Dr. William Stimpson in Behring's Strait. There is no mistake about this, strange as it may and must appear, that different individuals of the same species are indifferently operculate or inoperculate. A careful examination of this appendage reveals some singularities in it worthy of note. At first, the operculum is ovoid, with the nucleus near the edge at the larger end, and increases by additions around the edge, but principally upon the smaller or upper end. However, at some late period of its growth it takes a new start, and, seemingly, a new operculum is commenced underneath the old one, with a central nucleus which increases by annular additions, and finally has its edges very much thickened and turned upward, giving it a saucer-like appearance, while the old operculum seems as if laying upon the saucer, with its nucleus and some of the adjacent portion projecting over the edge anteriorly. It has a diameter of .1 inch. That its form is not due to an individual abnormality is evident from the fact that all the specimens examined were similar.

== Distribution ==
This species is confined in distribution to the North Pacific Ocean, mainly off Japan, the North Yellow Sea, the Bering Strait, and Alaska.
