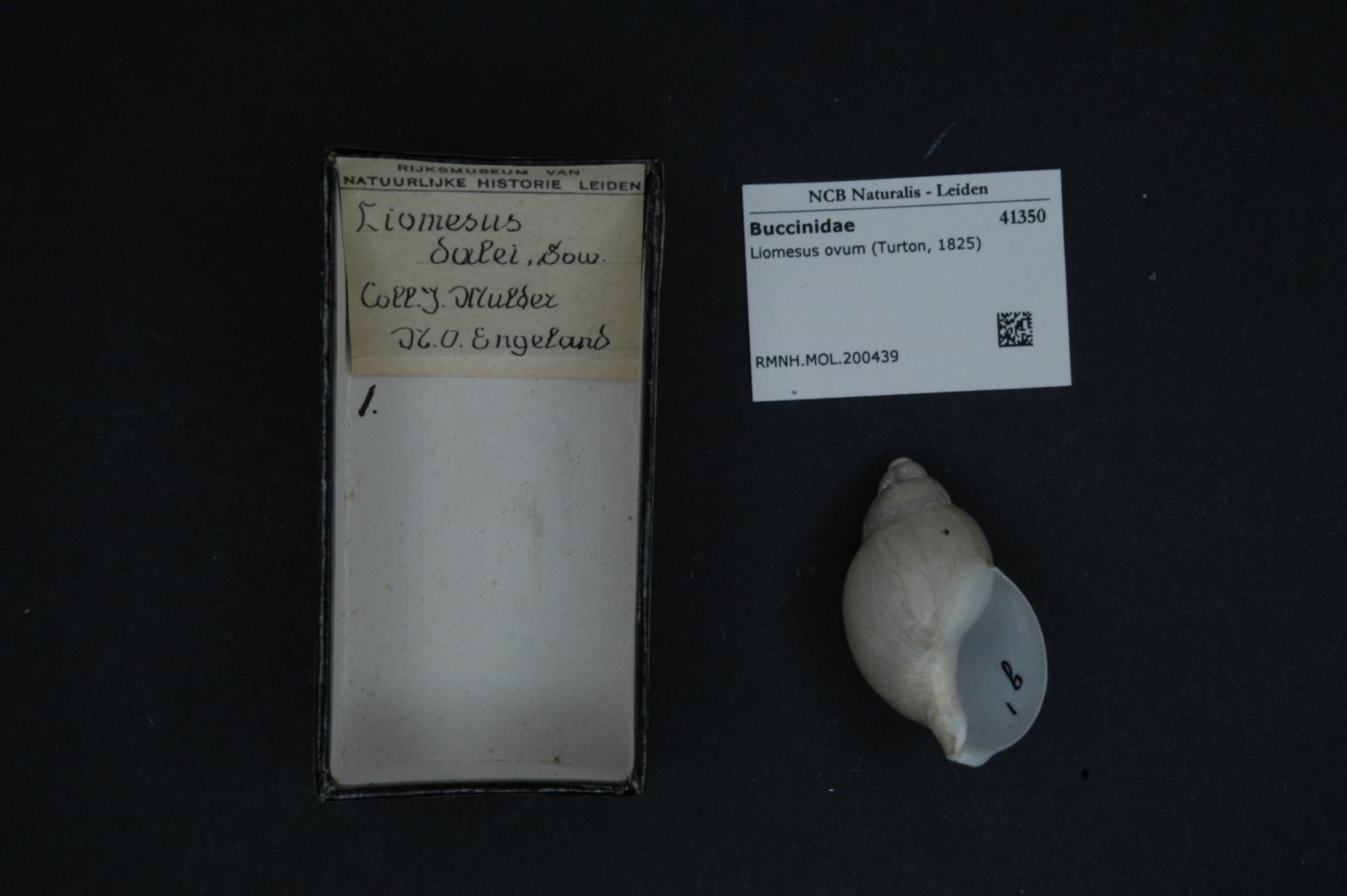
- Preserved specimen - Liomesus ovum (Turton, 1825)

Scientific classification
- Kingdom: Animalia
- Phylum: Mollusca
- Class: Gastropoda
- Subclass: Caenogastropoda
- Order: Neogastropoda
- Family: Buccinidae
- Genus: Liomesus
- Species: L. ovum

Binomial name
- Liomesus ovum (Turton, 1825)

= Liomesus ovum =

Species of gastropod

Liomesus ovum is a species of sea snail, a marine gastropod mollusk in the family Buccinidae, the true whelks.
