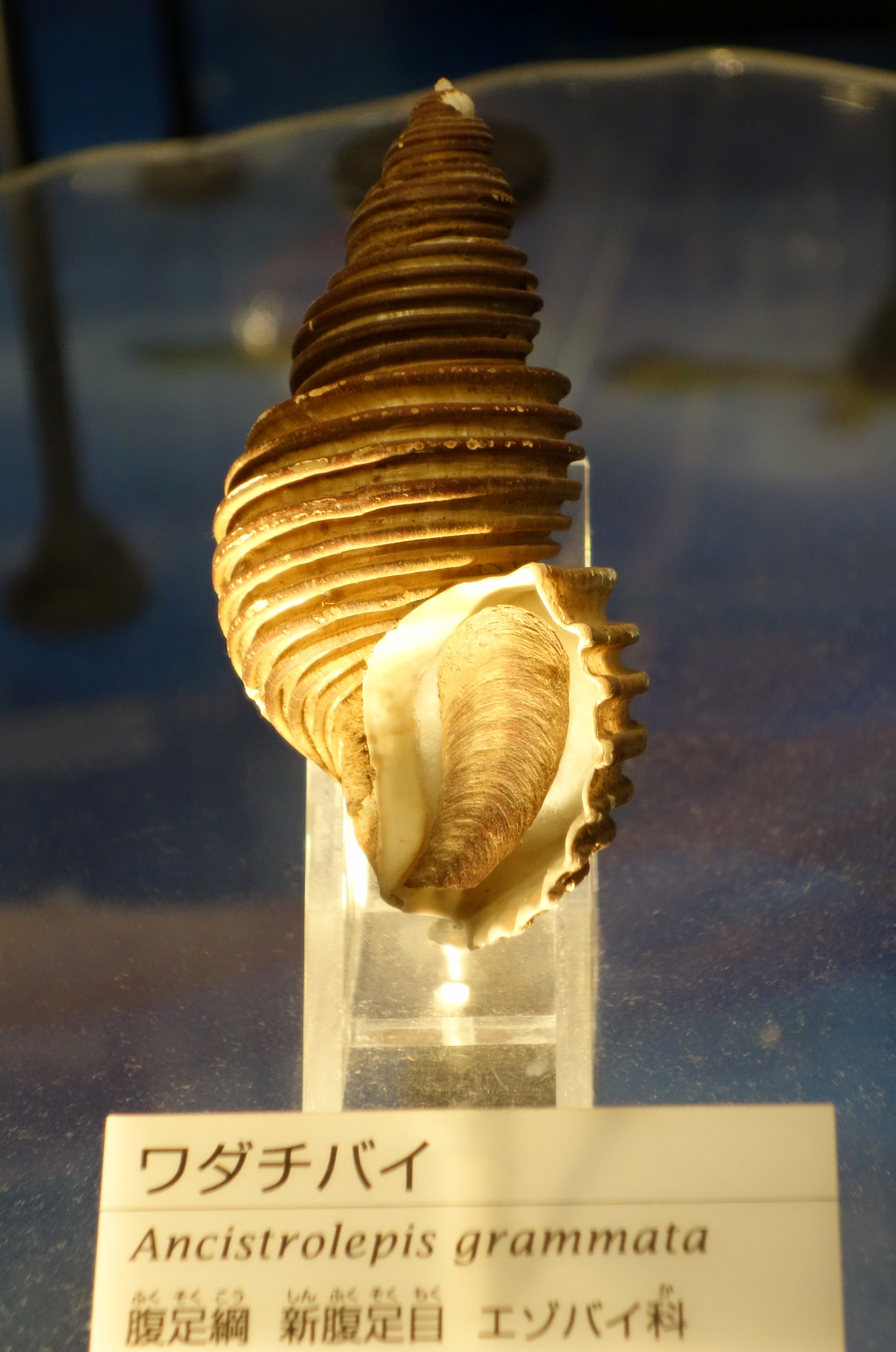
- Ancistrolepis grammatus shell and operculum

Scientific classification
- Kingdom: Animalia
- Phylum: Mollusca
- Class: Gastropoda
- Subclass: Caenogastropoda
- Order: Neogastropoda
- Family: Buccinidae
- Genus: Ancistrolepis
- Species: A. grammatus

Binomial name
- Ancistrolepis grammatus (W. H. Dall, 1907)

Subspecies
- Ancistrolepis grammatus yamazakii (Kuroda, T., 1962)

= Ancistrolepis grammatus =

Species of gastropod

Ancistrolepis grammatus is a species of Buccinidae. The species is distributed around Hokkaido, the Sea of Okhotsk, and the Kurile Islands. The species can be found at depths of about 200–300 meters. The species length usually varies between 100 and 115 millimeters. The species was first described in 1907.
