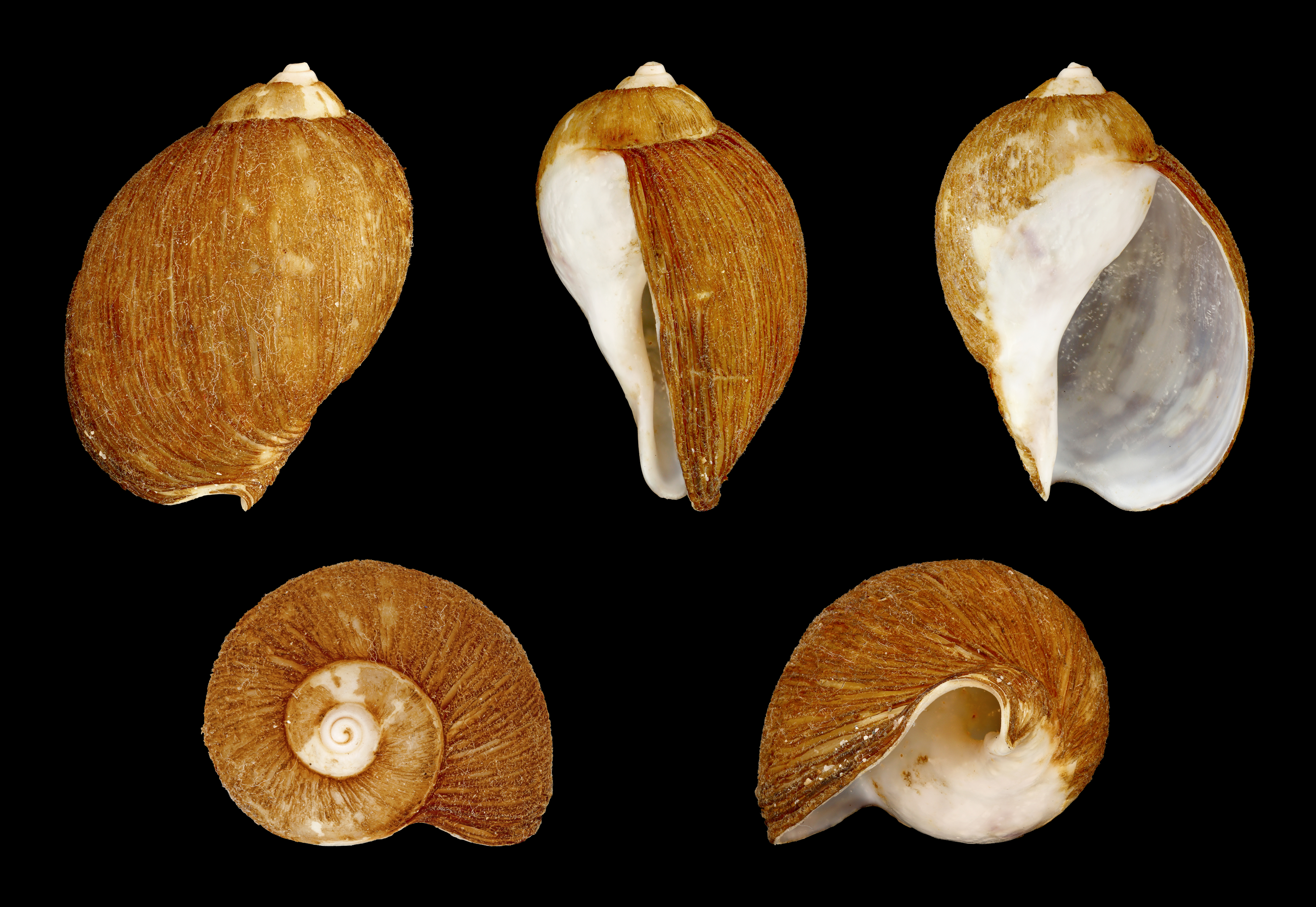
- Shell of Volutharpa perryi

Scientific classification
- Kingdom: Animalia
- Phylum: Mollusca
- Class: Gastropoda
- Subclass: Caenogastropoda
- Order: Neogastropoda
- Superfamily: Buccinoidea
- Family: Buccinidae
- Genus: Volutharpa
- Species: V. perryi

Binomial name
- Volutharpa perryi (Jay, 1857)

Synonyms
- Buccinum perryi (Jay, 1857); Bullia perryi Jay, 1857 (original combination); Volutharpa ampullacea perryi (Jay, 1857); Volutharpa fischeriana A. Adams, 1870; Volutharpa paulucciana Tapparone Canefri, 1882; Volutharpa salmiana Rolle, 1892

= Volutharpa perryi =

Species of gastropod

Volutharpa perryi is a species of sea snail, a marine gastropod mollusk in the family Buccinidae, the true whelks.

== Description ==
The length of the shell varies between 30 mm and 57 mm.

The shell is ovately globulose, rather thin and inflated towards the base. The spire is short and acute. The sutures are impressed. The whorls are smooth. The color of the shell is yellowish ash. The interior of the aperture is rusty brown.

== Distribution ==
This marine species occurs off Japan, in the Yellow Sea, the Korea sea and off Alaska and British Columbia, Canada.
