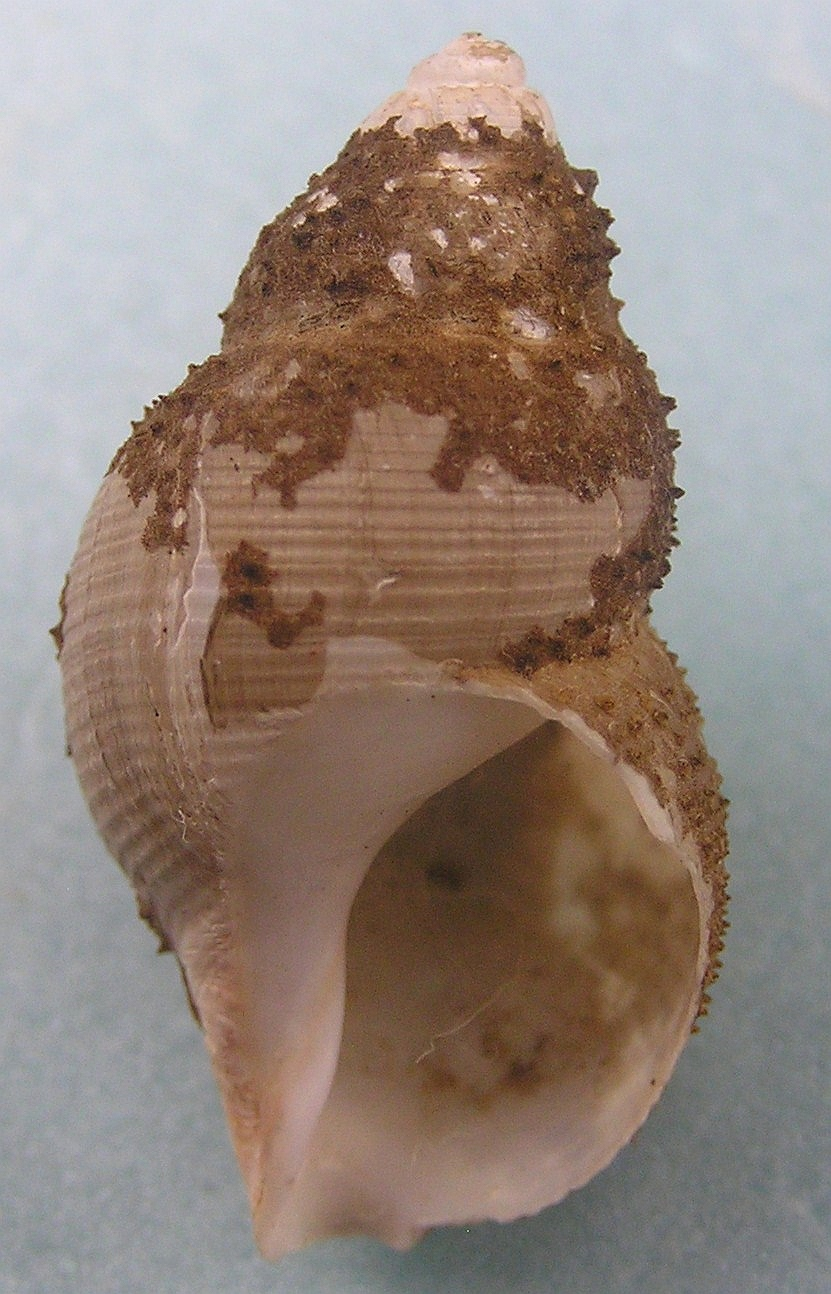
- A shell of Buccinum strigillatum, the periostracum is peeling off of this specimen

Scientific classification
- Kingdom: Animalia
- Phylum: Mollusca
- Class: Gastropoda
- Subclass: Caenogastropoda
- Order: Neogastropoda
- Family: Buccinidae
- Genus: Buccinum
- Species: B. strigillatum

Binomial name
- Buccinum strigillatum Dall, 1891

Synonyms
- Buccinum fucanum Dall, 1907

= Buccinum strigillatum =

Species of gastropod

Buccinum strigillatum is a species of sea snail, a marine gastropod mollusk in the family Buccinidae, the true whelks.

The two subspecies are:

- Buccinum strigillatum fucanum Dall, 1907 - the juanmore whelk
- Buccinum strigillatum strigillatum Dall, 1891

== Description ==
The adult shell grows to a length of 50 mm. The white shell has seven hardly inflated whorls with a deep suture and a low spire. The shell is covered with a hirsute epidermis. The sculpture shows numerous narrow primary ridges with channeled interspaces. The oval to oblong aperture is not expanded and shows a deep sinus near the shoulder.

The eggs are deposited on any hard substance, rock, shell, or sponge.

== Distribution ==
This species can be found along the west coast of North America.
