= Bayerius zenkevitchi =

Scientific classification
- Kingdom: Animalia
- Phylum: Mollusca
- Class: Gastropoda
- Subclass: Caenogastropoda
- Order: Neogastropoda
- Family: Buccinidae
- Genus: Bayerius
- Species: B. zenkevitchi

Binomial name
- Bayerius zenkevitchi (Lus, 1975)

Synonyms
- Bayerius peruvianus Warén & Bouchet, 2001; Tacita zenkevitchi Lus, 1975 (original combination)

Species of gastropod

Bayerius zenkevitchi is a species of sea snail, a marine gastropod mollusk in the family Buccinidae, the true whelks.

== Distribution ==
This abyssal marine species was found in the Peru-Chile Trench at 5200–6040 m.
