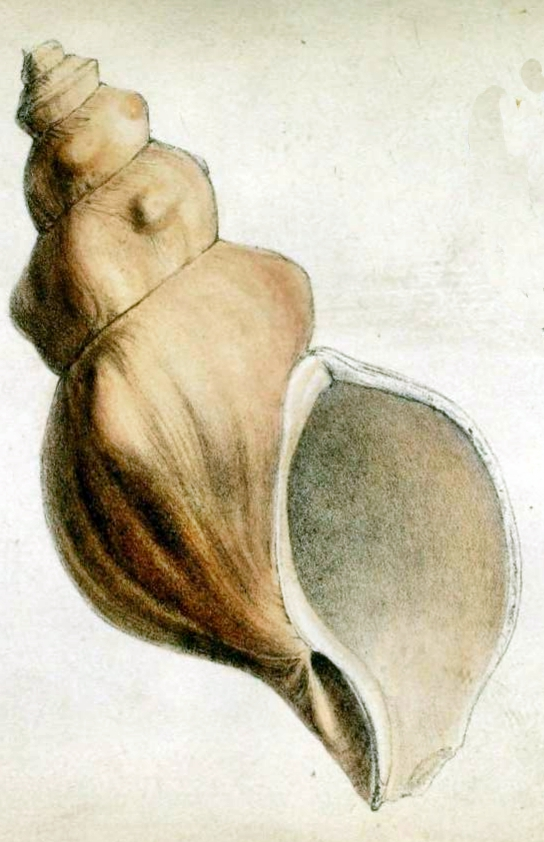
- Original drawing of a shell of Neptunea heros

Scientific classification
- Kingdom: Animalia
- Phylum: Mollusca
- Class: Gastropoda
- Subclass: Caenogastropoda
- Order: Neogastropoda
- Family: Buccinidae
- Genus: Neptunea
- Species: N. heros

Binomial name
- Neptunea heros (Gray, 1850)

Synonyms
- Chrysodomus heros J.E. Gray, 1850 (original combination); Fusus fornicatus normalis (f) Aurivillius, C.W.S., 1885; Neptunea middendorffiana MacGinitie, 1959; Neptunea tabularis Dall, W.H., 1919

= Neptunea heros =

Species of gastropod

Neptunea heros, common name : the heros neptune, is a species of sea snail, a marine gastropod mollusk in the family Buccinidae, the true whelks.

== Description ==
(Original description by J.E. Gray) The size of an adult shell varies between 60 mm and 175 mm. The elongate shell has a conical shape longer than the aperture. The whorls are convex. The two or three upper whorls have a strong central keel. The rest show irregularly placed distant rounder tubercles. The body whorl is rounded, not keeled. The inside of the aperture is white.

The erect egg-cases are ovate-oblong, on an expanded base and contracted beneath. The granular surface is deeply punctated.

The white, opaque, outer coat of the shell is very much inclined to separate from the inner or central coat, which presents, where the outer coat is removed, a smooth surface of yellowish or brown colour.

== Distribution ==
This species is distributed in the Northwest Atlantic Ocean and along Canada; it is also circum-Arctic, and can be found offshore Japan, Korea and Alaska.
