= Liomesus stimpsoni =

Scientific classification
- Kingdom: Animalia
- Phylum: Mollusca
- Class: Gastropoda
- Subclass: Caenogastropoda
- Order: Neogastropoda
- Family: Buccinidae
- Genus: Liomesus
- Species: L. stimpsoni

Binomial name
- Liomesus stimpsoni Dall, 1889

Species of gastropod

Liomesus stimpsoni is a species of sea snail, a marine gastropod mollusc in the family Buccinidae, the true whelks.
