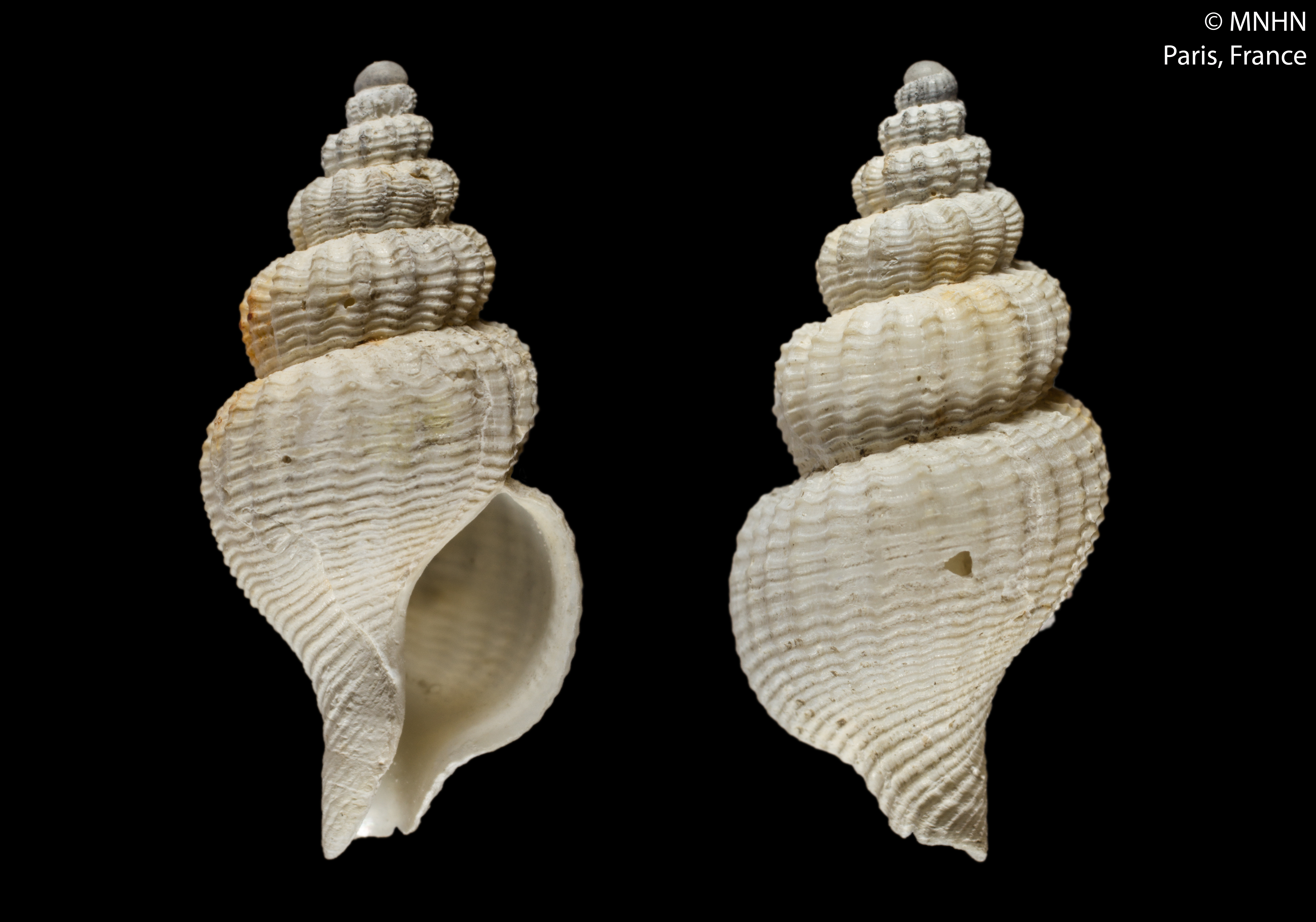
- Shell of Phaenomenella callophorella (holotype at MNHN, Paris)

Scientific classification
- Kingdom: Animalia
- Phylum: Mollusca
- Class: Gastropoda
- Subclass: Caenogastropoda
- Order: Neogastropoda
- Family: Buccinidae
- Genus: Phaenomenella
- Species: P. callophorella

Binomial name
- Phaenomenella callophorella (Fraussen, 2003)

Synonyms
- Manaria callophorella Fraussen, 2004

= Phaenomenella callophorella =

Species of gastropod

Phaenomenella callophorella is a species of sea snail, a marine gastropod mollusc in the family Buccinidae, the true whelks.

== Description ==
The length of the shell attains 19.2 mm.

== Distribution ==
This species occurs in the South China Sea off Taiwan.
