= Lussivolutopsius ochotensis =

Scientific classification
- Kingdom: Animalia
- Phylum: Mollusca
- Class: Gastropoda
- Subclass: Caenogastropoda
- Order: Neogastropoda
- Family: Buccinidae
- Genus: Lussivolutopsius
- Species: L. ochotensis

Binomial name
- Lussivolutopsius ochotensis Kantor, 1986

Species of gastropod

Lussivolutopsius ochotensis is a species of sea snail, a marine gastropod mollusc in the family Buccinidae, the true whelks.
