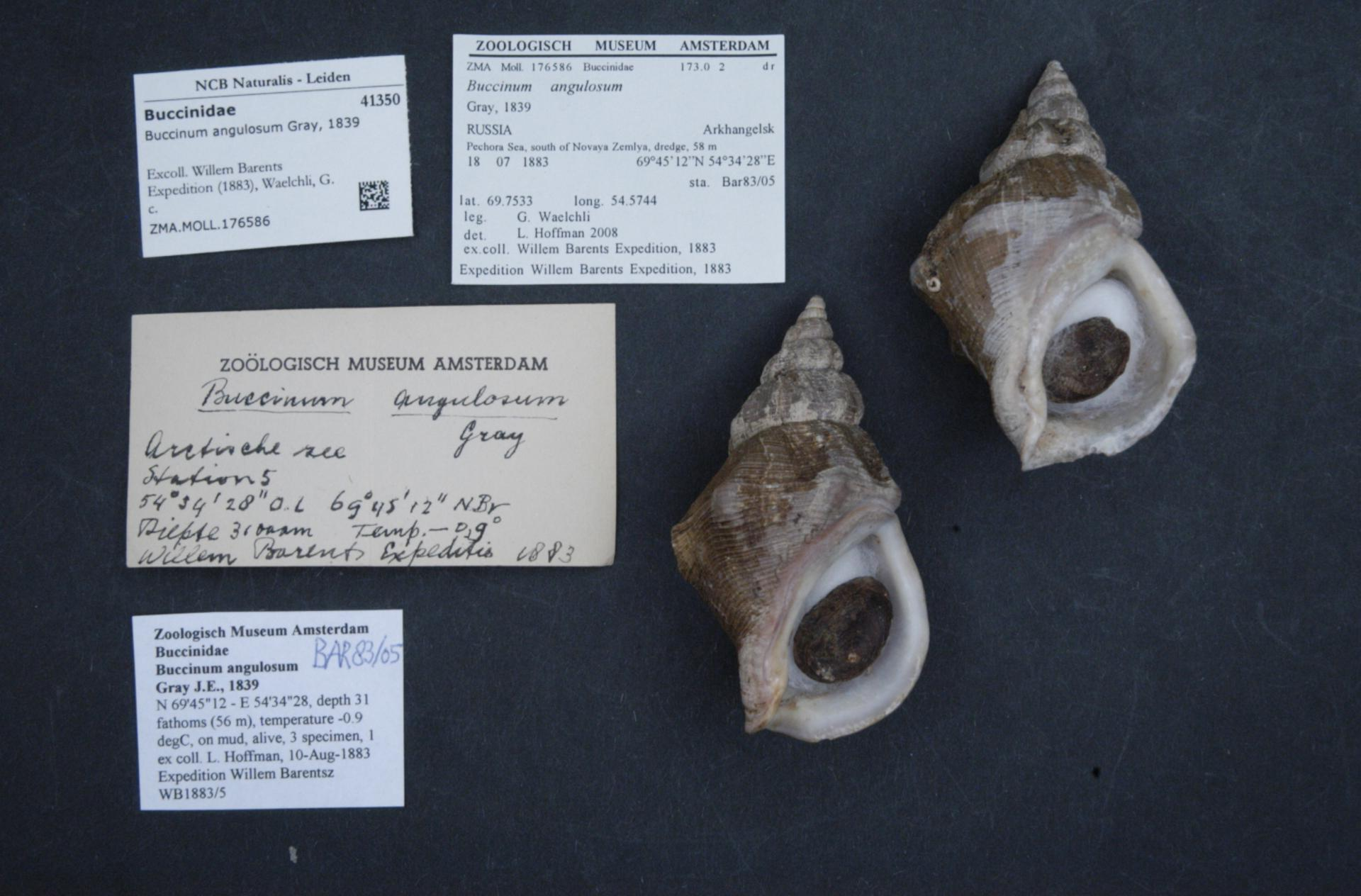

Scientific classification
- Kingdom: Animalia
- Phylum: Mollusca
- Class: Gastropoda
- Subclass: Caenogastropoda
- Order: Neogastropoda
- Family: Buccinidae
- Genus: Buccinum
- Species: B. angulosum

Binomial name
- Buccinum angulosum Gray J.E., 1839

= Buccinum angulosum =

Species of gastropod

Buccinum angulosum is a species of sea snail, a marine gastropod mollusk in the family Buccinidae, the true whelks.

== Description ==
This species attains a size of 60 mm.

== Distribution ==
Arctic Ocean: Chukchi Sea.
