= Phaenomenella angusta =

Scientific classification
- Kingdom: Animalia
- Phylum: Mollusca
- Class: Gastropoda
- Subclass: Caenogastropoda
- Order: Neogastropoda
- Family: Buccinidae
- Genus: Phaenomenella
- Species: P. angusta

Binomial name
- Phaenomenella angusta Hadorn & Fraussen, 2006

Species of gastropod

Phaenomenella angusta is a species of sea snail, a marine gastropod mollusc in the family Buccinidae, the true whelks.
