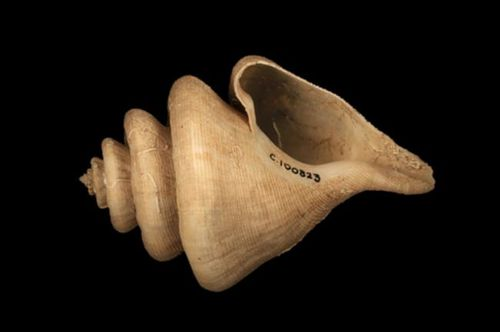
- Buccipagoda kengrahami AM C.100823

Scientific classification
- Kingdom: Animalia
- Phylum: Mollusca
- Class: Gastropoda
- Subclass: Caenogastropoda
- Order: Neogastropoda
- Superfamily: Buccinoidea
- Family: Buccinidae
- Genus: Buccipagoda; Ponder, 2010

Type species
- Buccipagoda kengrahami (Ponder, 1982)

Synonyms
- Kapala Ponder, 1982

= Buccipagoda =

Genus of gastropods

Buccipagoda is a genus of sea snails, marine gastropod molluscs in the family Buccinidae, the true whelks. It was first described in 1982 under the genus name Kapala by Winston Ponder with the name honouring the FRV Kapala, but the genus name had already been used. Hence, a replacement name was needed and given in 2010. The type species is Buccipagoda kengrahami (Ponder, 1982), formerly Kapala kengrahami.

The genus is endemic to Australia and found in the coastal waters of New South Wales, South Australia, Tasmania, and Victoria, on the continental slopes in mud and silt at depths of up to 457 m.

== Species ==
Species within the genus Buccipagoda include:

- Buccipagoda achilles B. A. Marshall & Walton, 2019
- Buccipagoda kengrahami (Ponder, 1982)
- Buccipagoda ponderi B. A. Marshall & Walton, 2019
- Buccipagoda bathybius (Bouchet & Warén, 1986) accepted as Sagenotriton bathybius (Bouchet & Warén, 1986)
- Buccipagoda bonaespei (Barnard, 1963) accepted as Sagenotriton bonaespei (Barnard, 1963)
