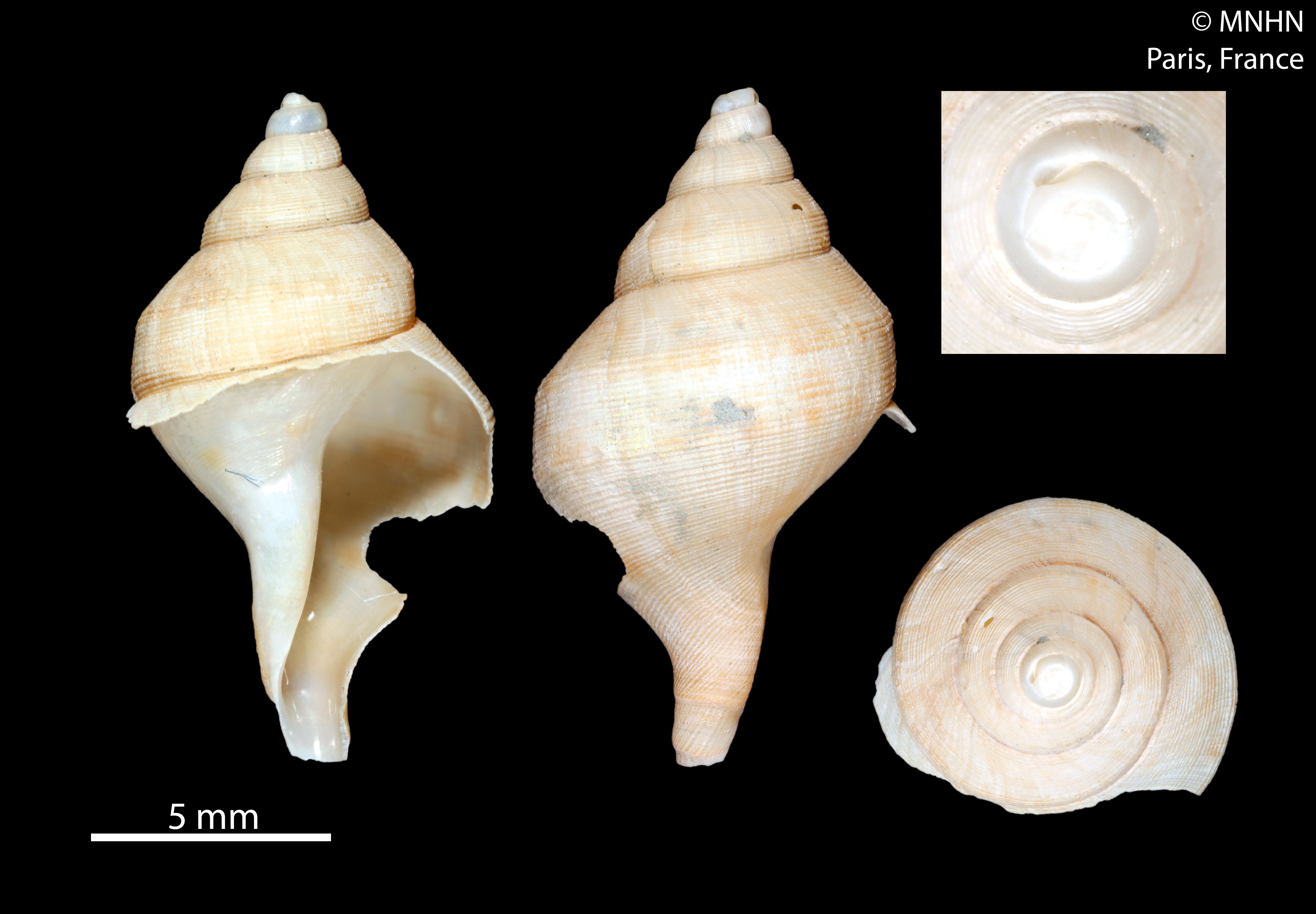
- Shell of Buccinum yadai (paratype at MNHN, Paris)

Scientific classification
- Kingdom: Animalia
- Phylum: Mollusca
- Class: Gastropoda
- Subclass: Caenogastropoda
- Order: Neogastropoda
- Family: Buccinidae
- Genus: Buccinum
- Species: B. yadai

Binomial name
- Buccinum yadai (Fraussen & Chino, 2009)

Synonyms
- Bathybuccinum yadai Fraussen & Chino, 2009 (original combination)

= Buccinum yadai =

Species of gastropod

Buccinum yadai is a species of sea snail, a marine gastropod mollusc in the family Buccinidae, the true whelks.

== Distribution ==
This marine species occurs off Japan.
