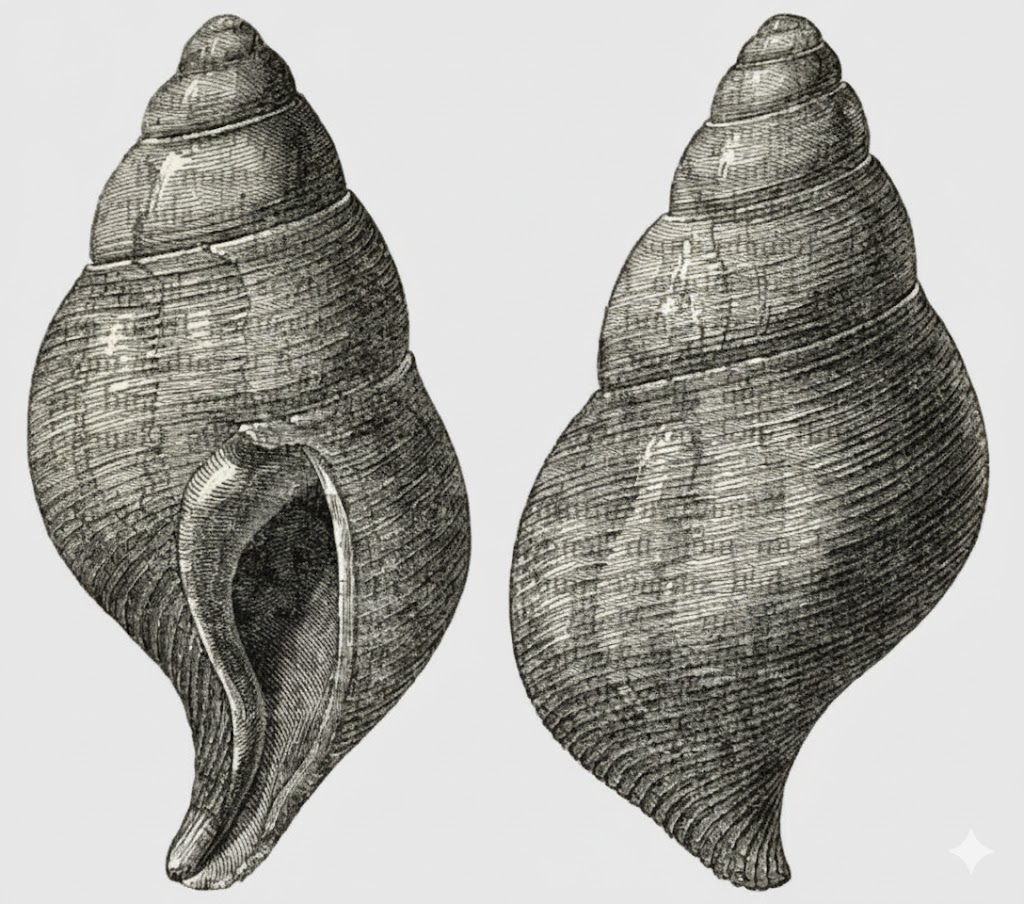
- Shell of † Atractodon elegans (holotype)

Scientific classification
- Kingdom: Animalia
- Phylum: Mollusca
- Class: Gastropoda
- Subclass: Caenogastropoda
- Order: Neogastropoda
- Family: Buccinidae
- Genus: †Atractodon; Charlesworth, 1837

= Atractodon =

Genus of gastropods

Atractodon is an extinct genus of large sea snails or true whelks, a marine gastropod molluscs in the family Buccinidae, the true whelks.

== Species ==
- † Atractodon elegans Charlesworth, 1837
