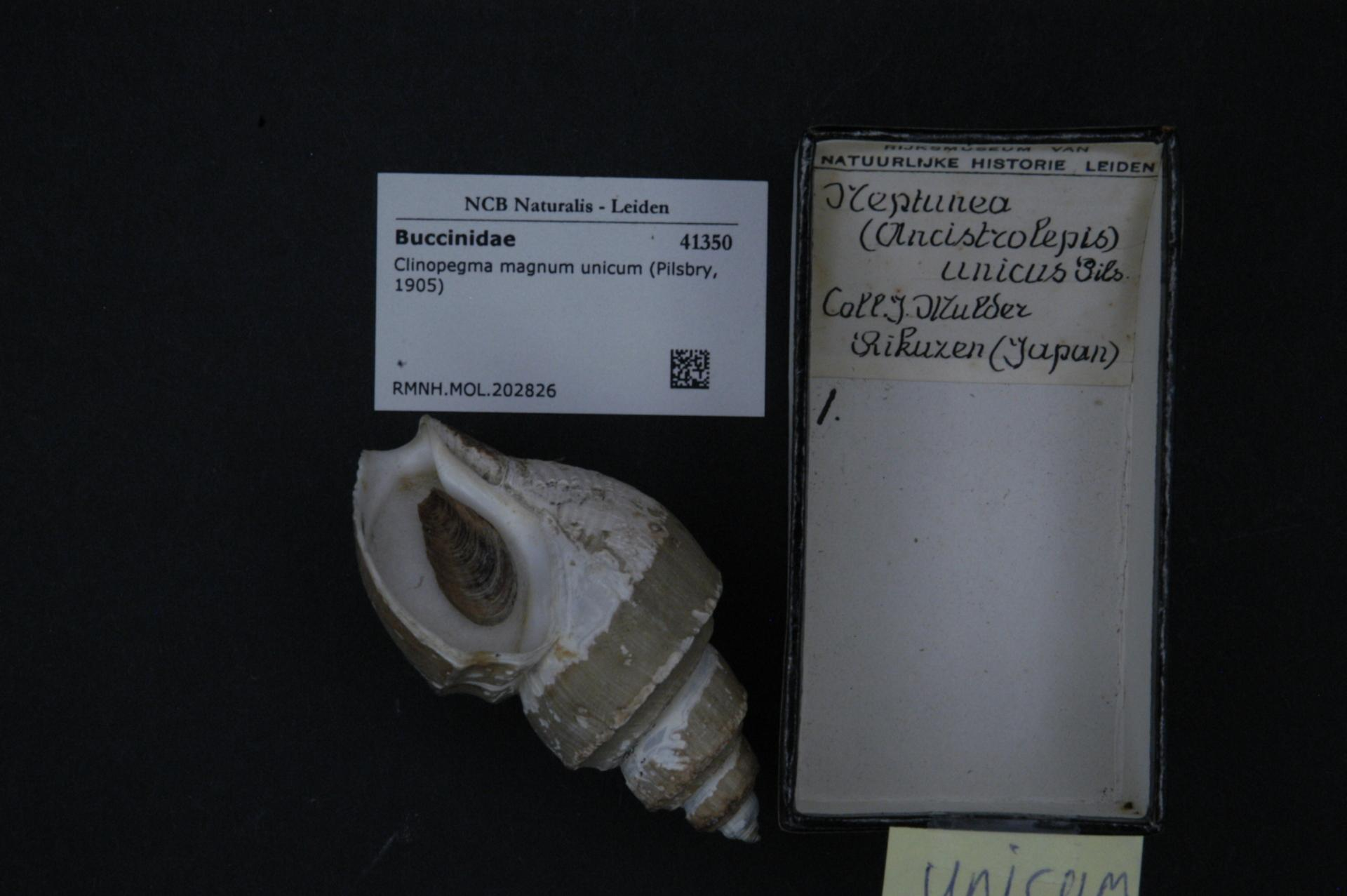

Scientific classification
- Kingdom: Animalia
- Phylum: Mollusca
- Class: Gastropoda
- Subclass: Caenogastropoda
- Order: Neogastropoda
- Family: Buccinidae
- Genus: Clinopegma
- Species: C. magnum

Binomial name
- Clinopegma magnum Dall, 1895

Synonyms
- Ancistrolepis magna Dall, 1895; Chrysodomus (Ancistrolepis) magnus Dall, 1895 superseded combination; Chrysodomus magnus Dall, 1895; Clinopegma magna (Dall, 1895) (wrong gender agreement of specific epithet)

= Clinopegma magnum =

Clinopegma magna

Species of gastropod

Clinopegma magnum is a species of sea snail, a marine gastropod mollusk in the family Buccinidae, the true whelks.

Subspecies

- Clinopegma magnum buccinoides T. Habe & Ki. Ito, 1965
- Clinopegma magnum damon (Dall, 1907)
- Clinopegma magnum magnum (Dall, 1895)
- Clinopegma magnum unicum (Pilsbry, 1905)
- Clinopegma magnum uritai (Kuroda, 1931)

== Description ==
This species attains a size of 80 mm.

== Distribution ==
Northern Pacific Ocean: Bering Sea.
