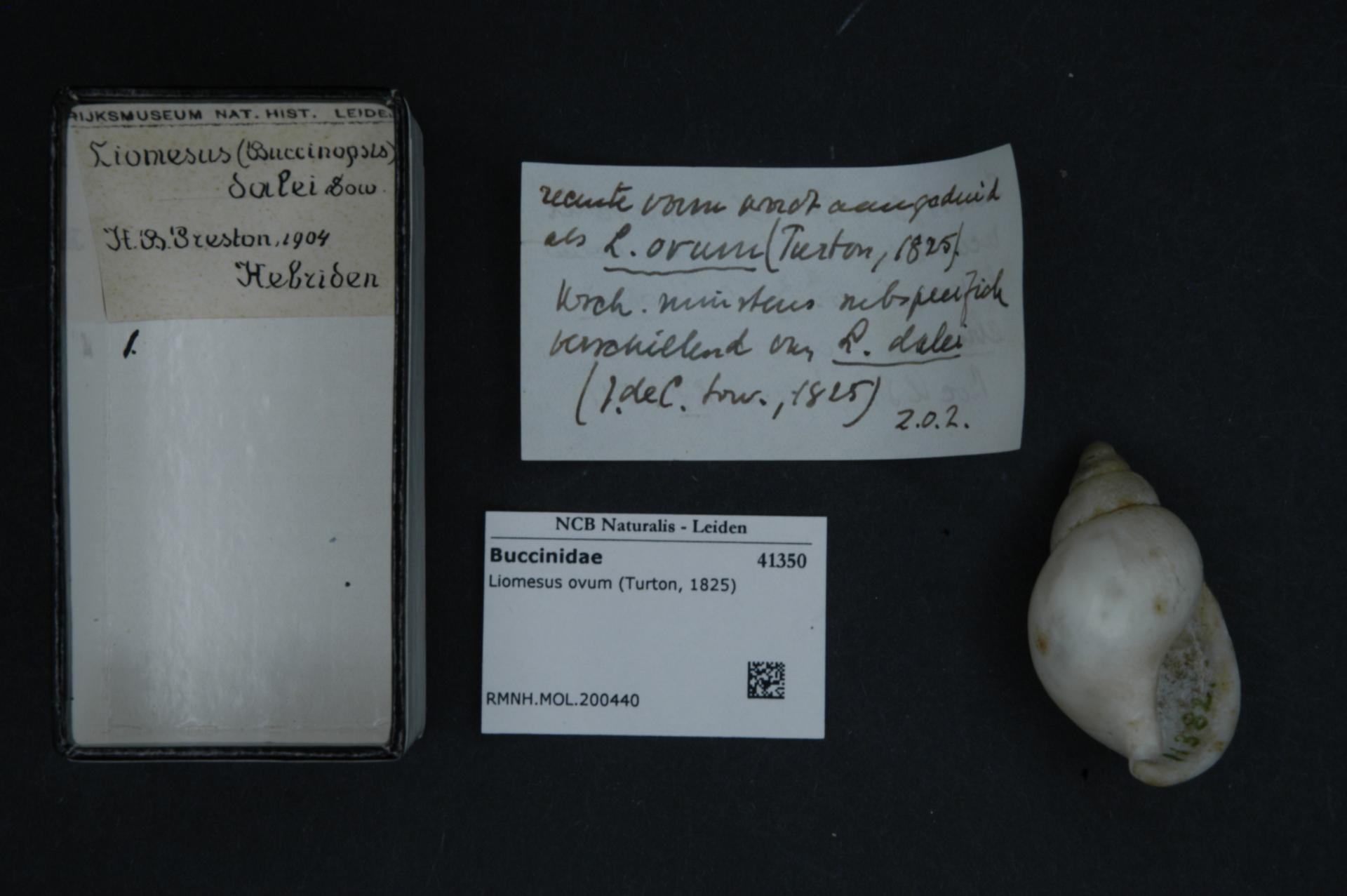
- Naturalis Biodiversity Center - RMNH.MOL.200440 - Liomesus ovum (Turton, 1825) - Buccinidae - Mollusc shell

Scientific classification
- Kingdom: Animalia
- Phylum: Mollusca
- Class: Gastropoda
- Subclass: Caenogastropoda
- Order: Neogastropoda
- Family: Buccinidae
- Genus: Liomesus; Adams H. & A., 1853

= Liomesus =

Genus of gastropods

Liomesus is a genus of sea snails, marine gastropod mollusks in the family Buccinidae, the true whelks.

== Species ==
Species within the genus Liomesus include:

- Liomesus ovum (Turton, 1825)
- Liomesus stimpsoni Dall, 1889
