= Clinopegma decora =

Scientific classification
- Kingdom: Animalia
- Phylum: Mollusca
- Class: Gastropoda
- Subclass: Caenogastropoda
- Order: Neogastropoda
- Family: Buccinidae
- Genus: Clinopegma
- Species: C. decora

Binomial name
- Clinopegma decora (Dall, 1925)

Species of gastropod

Clinopegma decora is a species of Buccinidae. The species is distributed in the Sea of Japan, off of south-western Sakhalin Island. The species is distributed in mud and muddy sand between a depth of 20 to 64 meters.
