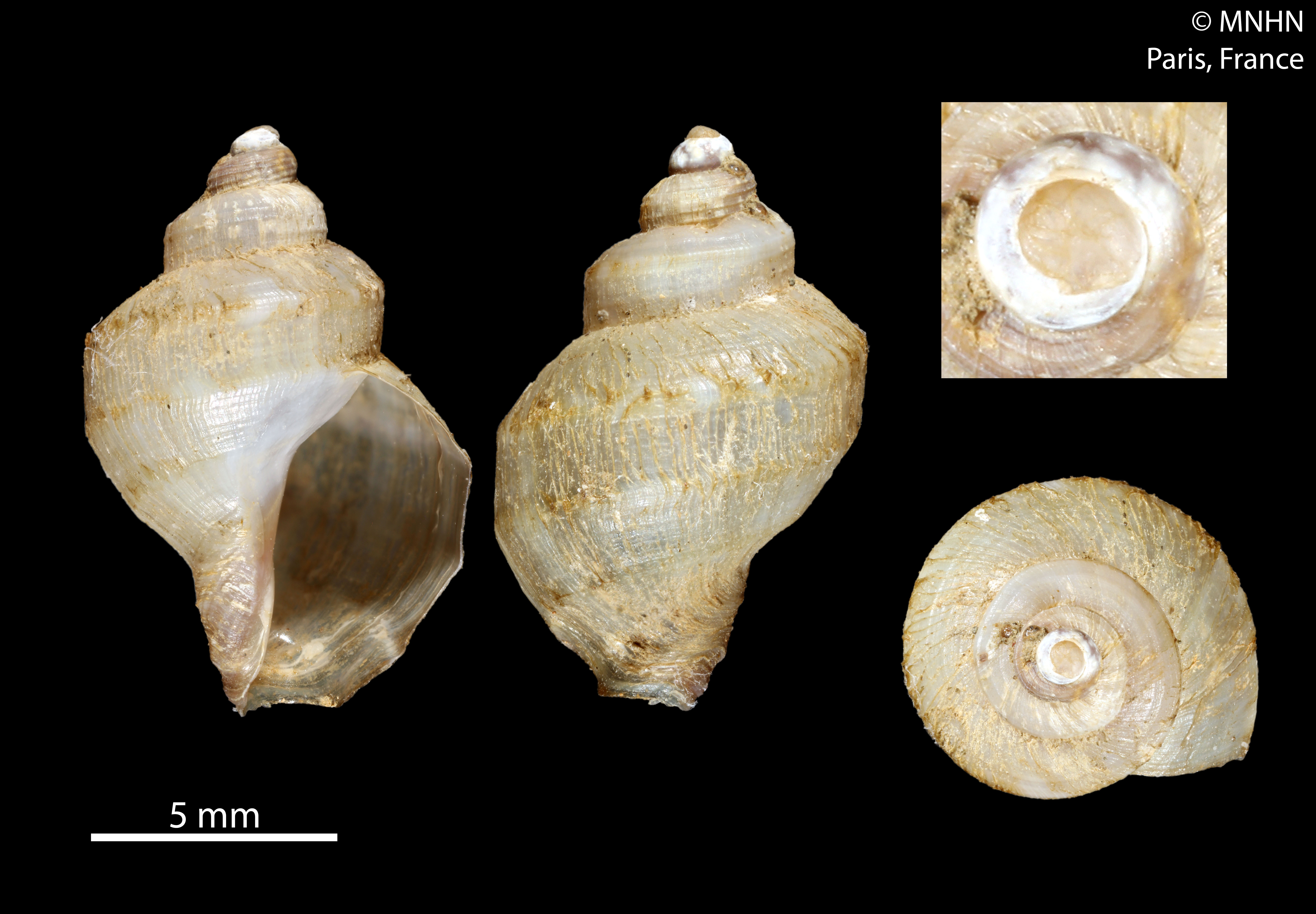
- Shell of Buccinum higuchii (paratype at MNHN, Paris)

Scientific classification
- Kingdom: Animalia
- Phylum: Mollusca
- Class: Gastropoda
- Subclass: Caenogastropoda
- Order: Neogastropoda
- Family: Buccinidae
- Genus: Buccinum
- Species: B. higuchii

Binomial name
- Buccinum higuchii (Fraussen & Chino, 2009)

Synonyms
- Bathybuccinum higuchii Fraussen & Chino, 2009 (original combination)

= Buccinum higuchii =

Species of gastropod

Buccinum higuchii is a species of sea snail, a marine gastropod mollusc in the family Buccinidae, the true whelks.

== Distribution ==
This marine species occurs off Japan.
