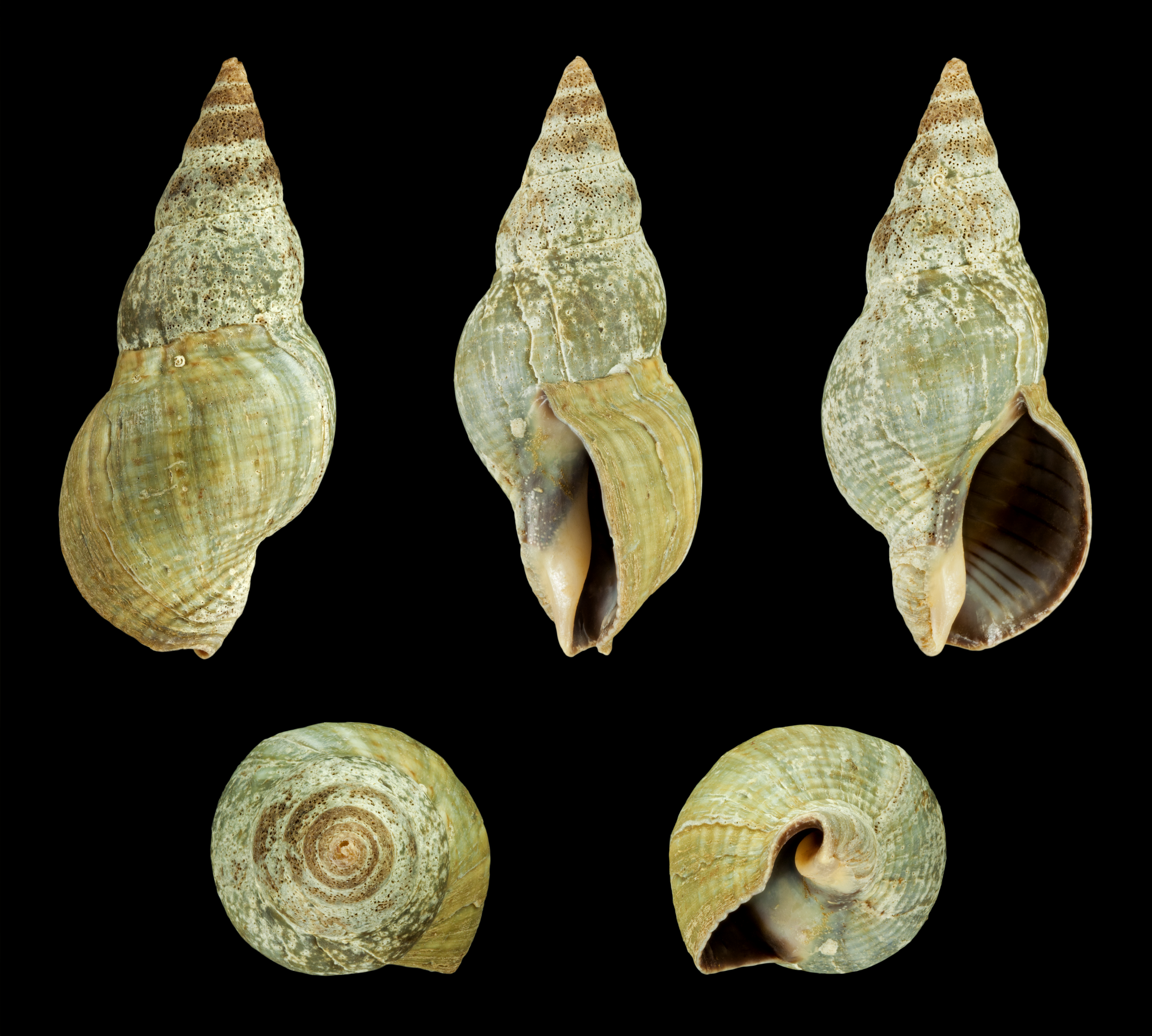
- Japeuthria ferrea

Scientific classification
- Kingdom: Animalia
- Phylum: Mollusca
- Class: Gastropoda
- Subclass: Caenogastropoda
- Order: Neogastropoda
- Family: Buccinidae
- Genus: Japeuthria; Iredale, 1918

Type species
- Buccinum ferreum Reeve, 1847

= Japeuthria =

Genus of gastropods

Japeuthria is a monospecific genus of sea snails, marine gastropod mollusks in the family Buccinidae, the true whelks.

== Species ==
Species within the genus Japeuthria include:

- Japeuthria ferrea (Reeve, 1847)
