= Lussivolutopsius =

Scientific classification
- Kingdom: Animalia
- Phylum: Mollusca
- Class: Gastropoda
- Subclass: Caenogastropoda
- Order: Neogastropoda
- Family: Buccinidae
- Genus: Lussivolutopsius; Kantor, 1983

Genus of gastropods

Lussivolutopsius is a genus of sea snails in the family Buccinidae, the true whelks.

== Species ==
Species within the genus Lussivolutopsius include:

- Lussivolutopsius emphaticus (Dall, 1907)
- Lussivolutopsius filosus (Dall, 1919)
- Lussivolutopsius furukawai (Oyama, 1951)
- Lussivolutopsius hydractiniferus (Kantor, 1983)
- Lussivolutopsius ivanovi (Kantor, 1983)
- Lussivolutopsius limatus (Dall, 1907)
- Lussivolutopsius marinae (Kantor, 1984)
- Lussivolutopsius memmi (Kantor, 1990)
- Lussivolutopsius ochotensis (Kantor, 1986)
- Lussivolutopsius strelzovae (Kantor, 1990)
