= Neptuneinae =

Scientific classification
- Kingdom: Animalia
- Phylum: Mollusca
- Class: Gastropoda
- Subclass: Caenogastropoda
- Order: Neogastropoda
- Superfamily: Buccinoidea
- Family: Buccinidae
- Subfamily: Neptuneinae; W. Stimpson, 1865

Synonyms
- Chrysodominae Dall, 1870; Neptuneidae W. Stimpson, 1865

Subfamily of gastropods

The Neptuneinae are taxonomic subfamily of large sea snails, often known as whelks.

== Genera ==
- Aulacofusus Dall, 1918
- Laevisipho J. H. McLean & R. N. Clark, 2023
- Neptunea Röding, 1798

Synonyms

- Barbitonia Dall, 1916 accepted as Neptunea (Barbitonia) Dall, 1916 represented as Neptunea Röding, 1798
- Chrysodomus Swainson, 1840 accepted as Neptunea Röding, 1798 (junior synonym)
- Costaria Golikov, 1977 accepted as Neptunea Röding, 1798
- Golikovia Habe & Sato, 1973 accepted as Neptunea (Golikovia) Habe & Sato, 1973 accepted as Neptunea Röding, 1798
- Neptunia Locard, 1886 accepted as Neptunea Röding, 1798 (unjustified emendation)
