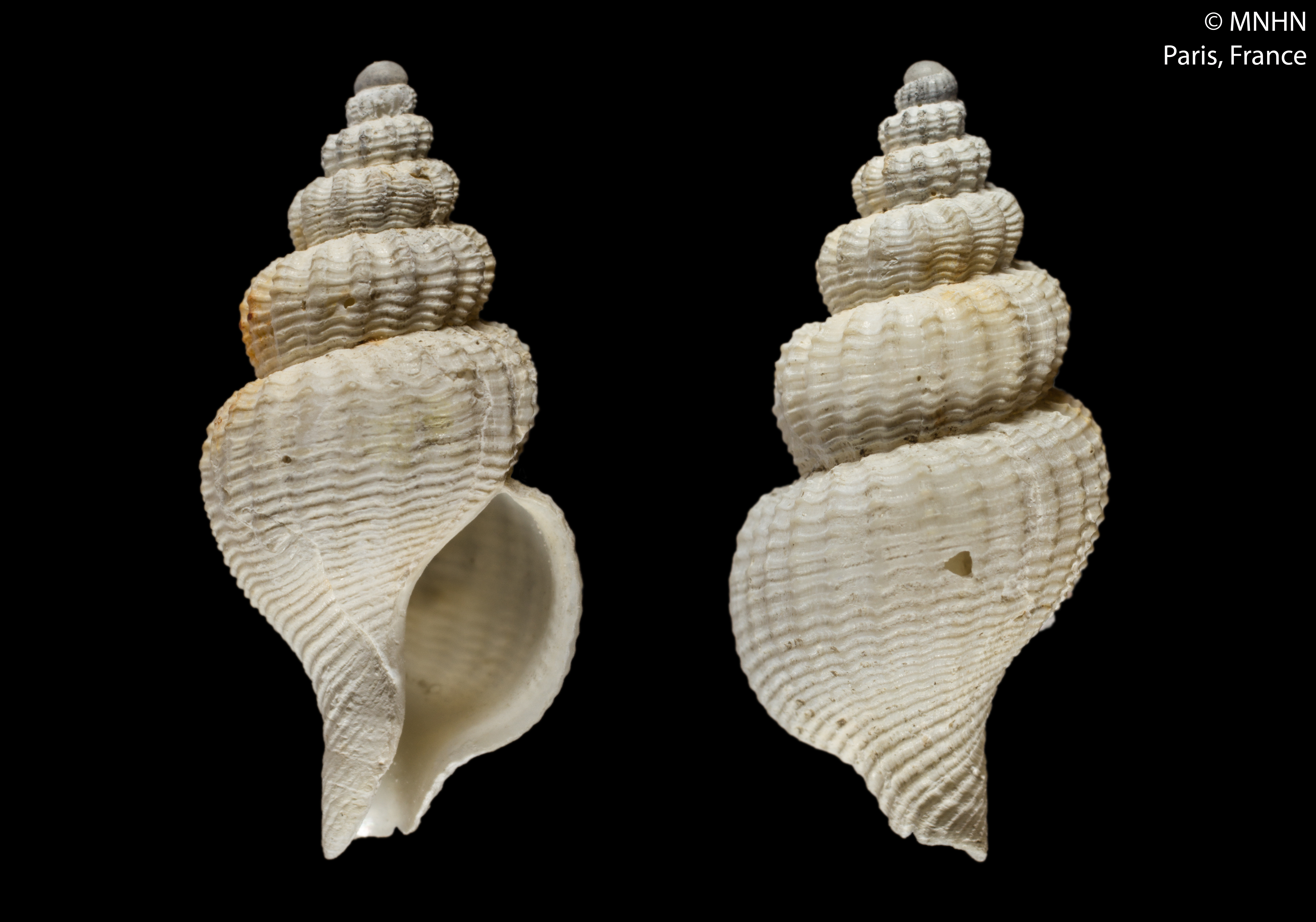
- Shell of Phaenomenella callophorella (holotype at MNHN, Paris)

Scientific classification
- Kingdom: Animalia
- Phylum: Mollusca
- Class: Gastropoda
- Subclass: Caenogastropoda
- Order: Neogastropoda
- Superfamily: Buccinoidea
- Family: Buccinidae
- Genus: Phaenomenella; Fraussen, 2006

Type species
- Manaria inflata Shikama, 1971

= Phaenomenella =

Genus of gastropods

Phaenomenella is a genus of sea snails, marine gastropod molluscs in the subfamily Siphonaliinae of the family Buccinidae, the true whelks.

== Species ==
According to the World Register of Marine Species (WoRMS), the following species with valid names are included within the genus Phaenomenella :

- Phaenomenella angusta Hadorn & Fraussen, 2006
- Phaenomenella callophorella (Fraussen, 2003)
- Phaenomenella cirsiumoides (Fraussen, 2004)
- Phaenomenella inflata (Shikama, 1971)
- Phaenomenella insulapratasensis (Okutani & Lan, 1994)
- Phaenomenella mokenorum Fraussen, 2008
- Phaenomenella nicoi Kantor, Kosyan, Sorokin & Fedosov, 2020
- Phaenomenella samadiae Kantor, Kosyan, Sorokin & Fedosov, 2020
- Phaenomenella thachi Fraussen & Stahlschmidt, 2012
- Phaenomenella venusta Fraussen & Stahlschmidt, 2012
- Phaenomenella vexabilis Fraussen & Stahlschmidt, 2013
