= Bayerius =

Scientific classification
- Kingdom: Animalia
- Phylum: Mollusca
- Class: Gastropoda
- Subclass: Caenogastropoda
- Order: Neogastropoda
- Family: Buccinidae
- Genus: Bayerius; Olsson, 1971

Synonyms
- Calliloconcha ·(incorrect subsequent spelling); Calliloncha Lus, 1978 ·; Mohnia (Tacita) Lus, 1971 ·; Paracalliloncha Lus, 1989 (uncertain synonym); Tacita Lus, 1971

Genus of gastropods

Bayerius is a genus of sea snails, marine gastropod mollusks in the family Buccinidae, the true whelks.

== Species ==
Species within the genus Bayerius include:

- Bayerius arnoldi (Lus, 1981)
- Bayerius fragilissimus (Dall, 1908)
- Bayerius holoserica (Lus, 1971)
- Bayerius inflatus Kantor, Kosyan, Sorokin, Herbert & Fedosov, 2020
- Bayerius knudseni (Bouchet & Warén, 1986)
- Bayerius nekrasovorum Kantor, Kosyan, Sorokin, Herbert & Fedosov, 2020
- Bayerius solidus (Lus, 1978)
- Bayerius ultraabyssalis (Lus, 1989)
- Bayerius zenkevitchi (Lus, 1975)

- Brought into synonymy:

- Bayerius peruvianus Warén & Bouchet, 2001: synonym of Bayerius zenkevitchi (Lus, 1975)
