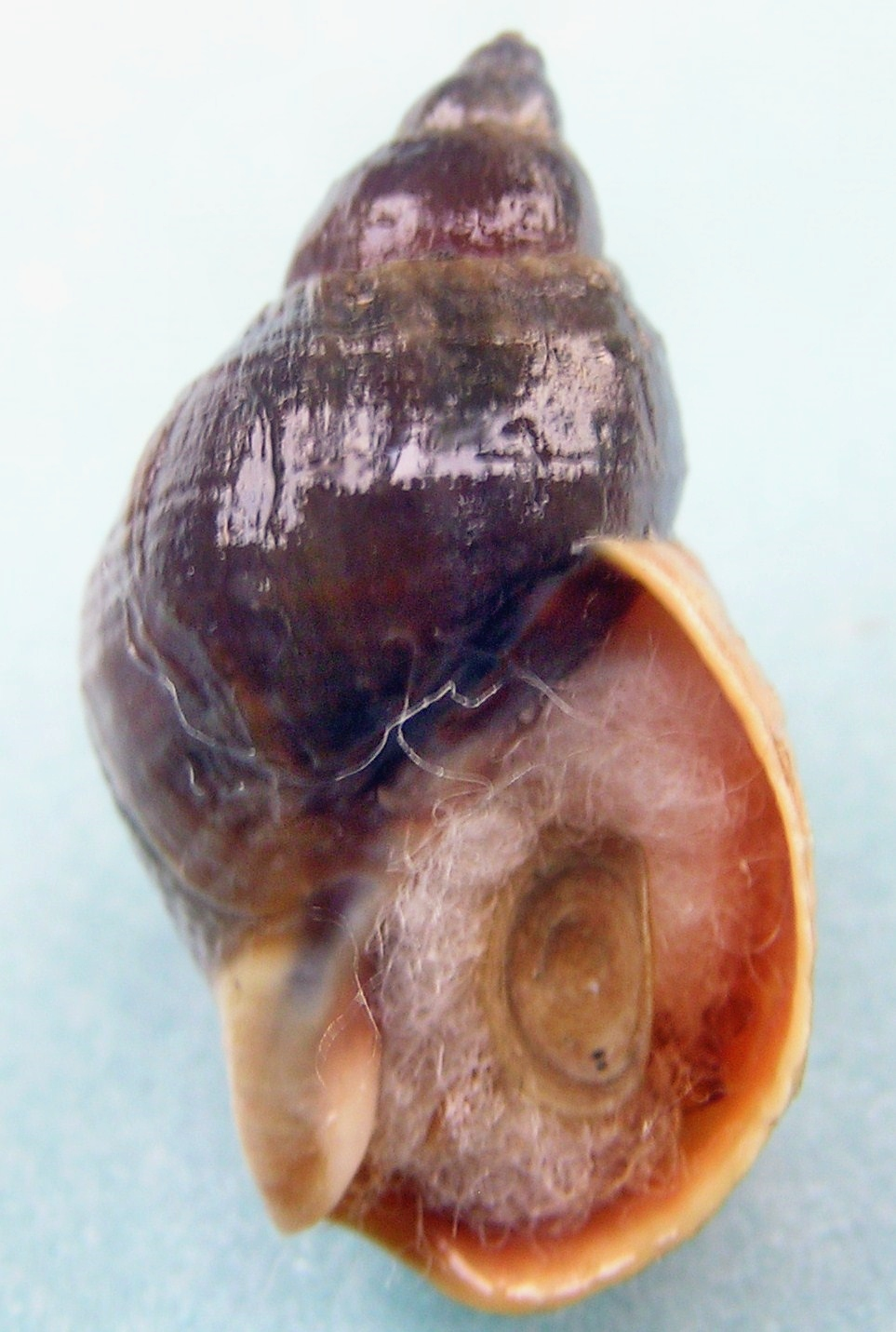
- A shell of Buccinum baerii. The operculum has been glued to cotton in the aperture

Scientific classification
- Kingdom: Animalia
- Phylum: Mollusca
- Class: Gastropoda
- Subclass: Caenogastropoda
- Order: Neogastropoda
- Family: Buccinidae
- Genus: Buccinum
- Species: B. baerii

Binomial name
- Buccinum baerii (Middendorff, 1848)

Synonyms
- Tritonium (Fusus) baerii Middendorff, 1848 (basionym); Tritonium baerii Middendorff, 1848 (original combination); Volutharpa morchiana P. Fischer, 1859

= Buccinum baerii =

Species of sea snail

Buccinum baerii, common name Baer's buccinum, is a species of sea snail, a marine gastropod mollusk in the family Buccinidae, the true whelks. The epithet is written by some authors as "baeri".

== Description ==
The size of an adult shell varies between 25 mm and 54 mm. The thin shell has an elongate to ovate shape with a large broad, convex body whorl. The conical spire is pointed. There are numerous, rounded spiral cords on the whorls; but they may be hard to see. In some specimens, the cords are large with occasional low and broad axial ribs. The presence or absence of sculpture in this species is an individual character and is not based on a geographic location. The broad oval aperture points upwards. The siphonal canal is short and broad. The columella and the parietal wall are curved showing a thin, yellowish-white callus. The horny operculum is small and oval. The color of the shell varies between yellowish-brown and purplish-gray.

Baer's buccinum is host to larval stages of trematodes.

The hermit crab Pagurus hirsutiusculus (Dana, 1851) can be found in empty shells of Baer's buccinum.

== Distribution ==
This cold-water species occurs on rocky shores, sand or gravel in the intertidal zone to depths of 15m. in the Bering Sea and Aleutian Islands to Kodiak, Alaska
