= Eclectofusus dedonderi =

Scientific classification
- Kingdom: Animalia
- Phylum: Mollusca
- Class: Gastropoda
- Subclass: Caenogastropoda
- Order: Neogastropoda
- Family: Eosiphonidae
- Genus: Eclectofusus
- Species: E. dedonderi

Binomial name
- Eclectofusus dedonderi (Fraussen & Hadorn, 2001)

Synonyms
- Pararetifusus dedonderi Fraussen & Hadorn, 2001 (original combination)

Species of sea snail

Eclectofusus dedonderi is a species of sea snail, a marine gastropod mollusc in the family Eosiphonidae.

== Description ==
The length of the shell attains 12 mm.

== Distribution ==
This marine species occurs off the Balicasag Island, the Philippines. The species resides 120 to 250 meters underwater.
