= Sulcosinus =

Scientific classification
- Kingdom: Animalia
- Phylum: Mollusca
- Class: Gastropoda
- Subclass: Caenogastropoda
- Order: Neogastropoda
- Superfamily: Buccinoidea
- Family: incertae sedis
- Genus: Sulcosinus; Dall, 1895

Type species
- Buccinum taphrium Dall, 1891

Synonyms
- Buccinum (Sulcosinus) Dall, 1895; Sulkosinus Dall, 1895 (misspelling)

Genus of gastropods

Sulcosinus is a genus of large sea snails or true whelks, marine gastropod molluscs in the superfamily Buccinoidea.

== Description ==
(Original description) The shell is thin and features a deeply channeled suture, a strongly reflected lip, and a thick parietal callous deposit.

== Species ==
According to the World Register of Marine Species, the following species with valid names are included within the genus Sulcosinus:

- Sulcosinus carinatus J. H. McLean & R. N. Clark, 2023
- Sulcosinus taphrium (Dall, 1891)

Synonyms

- Sulcosinus orientalis Golikov & Gulbin, 1977: synonym of Clinopegma borealis Tiba, 1969
