= Clinopegma =

Scientific classification
- Kingdom: Animalia
- Phylum: Mollusca
- Class: Gastropoda
- Subclass: Caenogastropoda
- Order: Neogastropoda
- Family: Buccinidae
- Genus: Clinopegma; Grant & Gale, 1931

Synonyms
- Ancistrolepis (Clinopegma) U. S. Grant & Gale, 1931; Neptunea (Clinopegma) U. S. Grant & Gale, 1931 (original rank)

Genus of gastropods

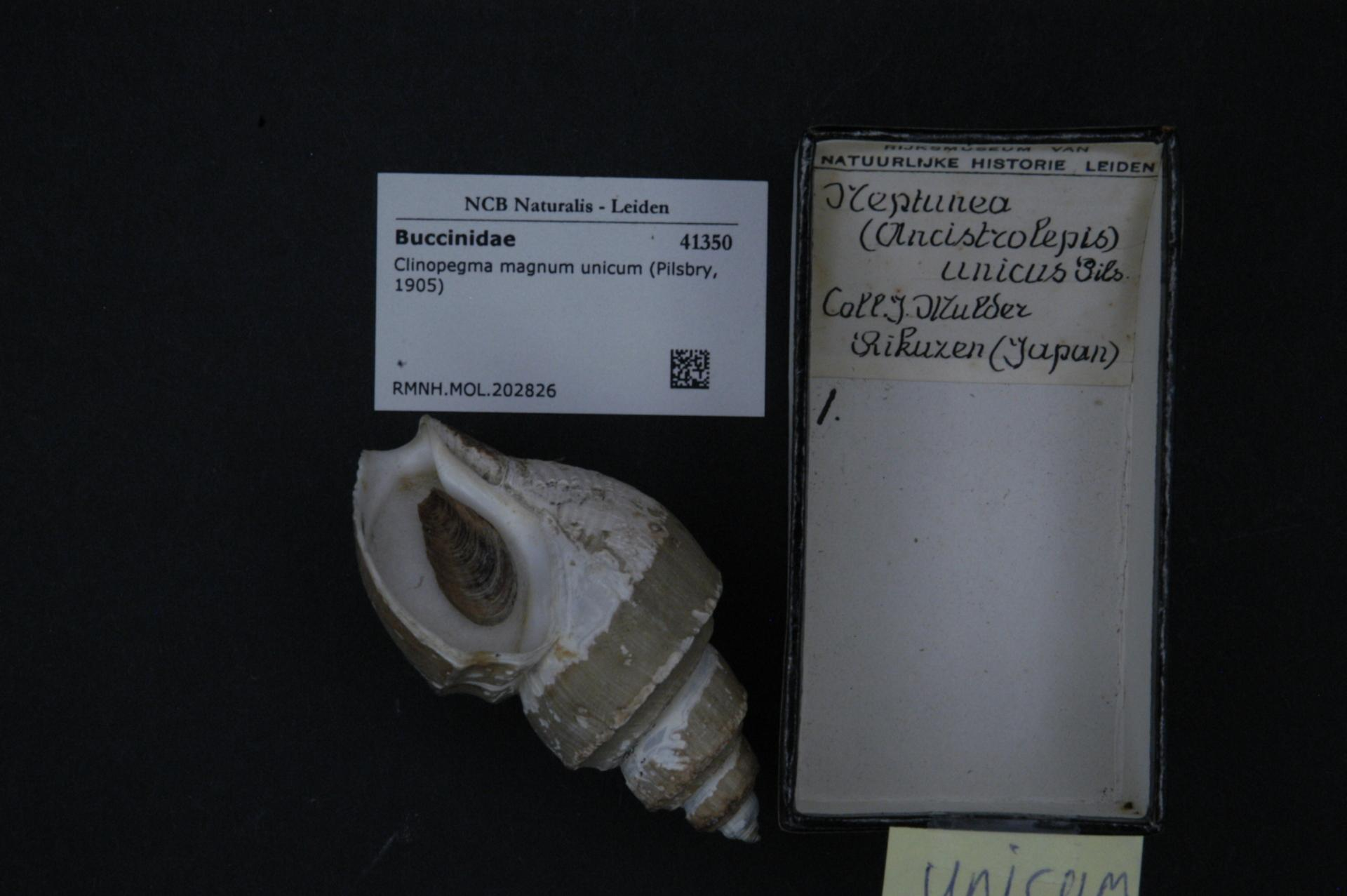

Clinopegma is a genus of sea snails, marine gastropod mollusks in the family Buccinidae, the true whelks.

== Species ==
Species within the genus Clinopegma include:

- Clinopegma borealis Tiba, 1969
- Clinopegma chikaoi Tiba, 1968
- Clinopegma decora (Dall, 1925)
- Clinopegma hirsutum Tiba, 1971
- Clinopegma magnum
- Clinopegma sasakii T. Habe & Ki. Ito, 1970

Synonyms

- Clinopegma aequapaceum Tiba, 1981: synonym of Clinopegma magnum unicum (Pilsbry, 1905) (junior subjective synonym)
- Clinopegma beringianum (Dall, 1919): synonym of Neancistrolepis beringiana (Dall, 1919)
- Clinopegma buccinoides T. Habe & Ki. Ito, 1964: synonym of Clinopegma magnum buccinoides T. Habe & Ki. Ito, 1965 (superseded rank)
- Clinopegma checknum Tiba, 1981: synonym of Clinopegma hirsutum Tiba, 1971 (junior subjective synonym)
- Clinopegma hachijoensis Okutani, 1964: synonym of Japelion hachijoensis (Okutani, 1964) (superseded combination)
- Clinopegma ishikawai Tiba, 1974: synonym of Clinopegma hirsutum Tiba, 1971 (incorrect subsequent spelling of the species epithet)
- Clinopegma isikawai Tiba, 1974: synonym of Clinopegma hirsutum Tiba, 1971 (junior subjective synonym)
- Clinopegma magna (Dall, 1895): synonym of Clinopegma magnum (Dall, 1895) (wrong gender agreement of specific epithet)
- Clinopegma unicum (Pilsbry, 1905): synonym of Clinopegma magnum unicum (Pilsbry, 1905) (superseded rank)
