= Aleutibuccinum =

Scientific classification
- Kingdom: Animalia
- Phylum: Mollusca
- Class: Gastropoda
- Subclass: Caenogastropoda
- Order: Neogastropoda
- Family: Buccinidae
- Genus: Aleutibuccinum
- Species: A. clarki

Binomial name
- Aleutibuccinum clarki (Kantor & Harasewych, 1998)

Synonyms
- Bathybuccinum (Ovulatibuccinum) clarki Kantor & Harasewych, 1998 superseded combination; Buccinum clarki (Kantor & Harasewych, 1998); Ovulatibuccinum clarki (Kantor & Harasewych, 1998) ·

Genus of gastropod

Aleutibuccinum is a genus of sea snail, a marine gastropod mollusc in the subfamily Buccininae in the family Buccinidae, the true whelks. Its only species is Aleutibuccinum clarki.
