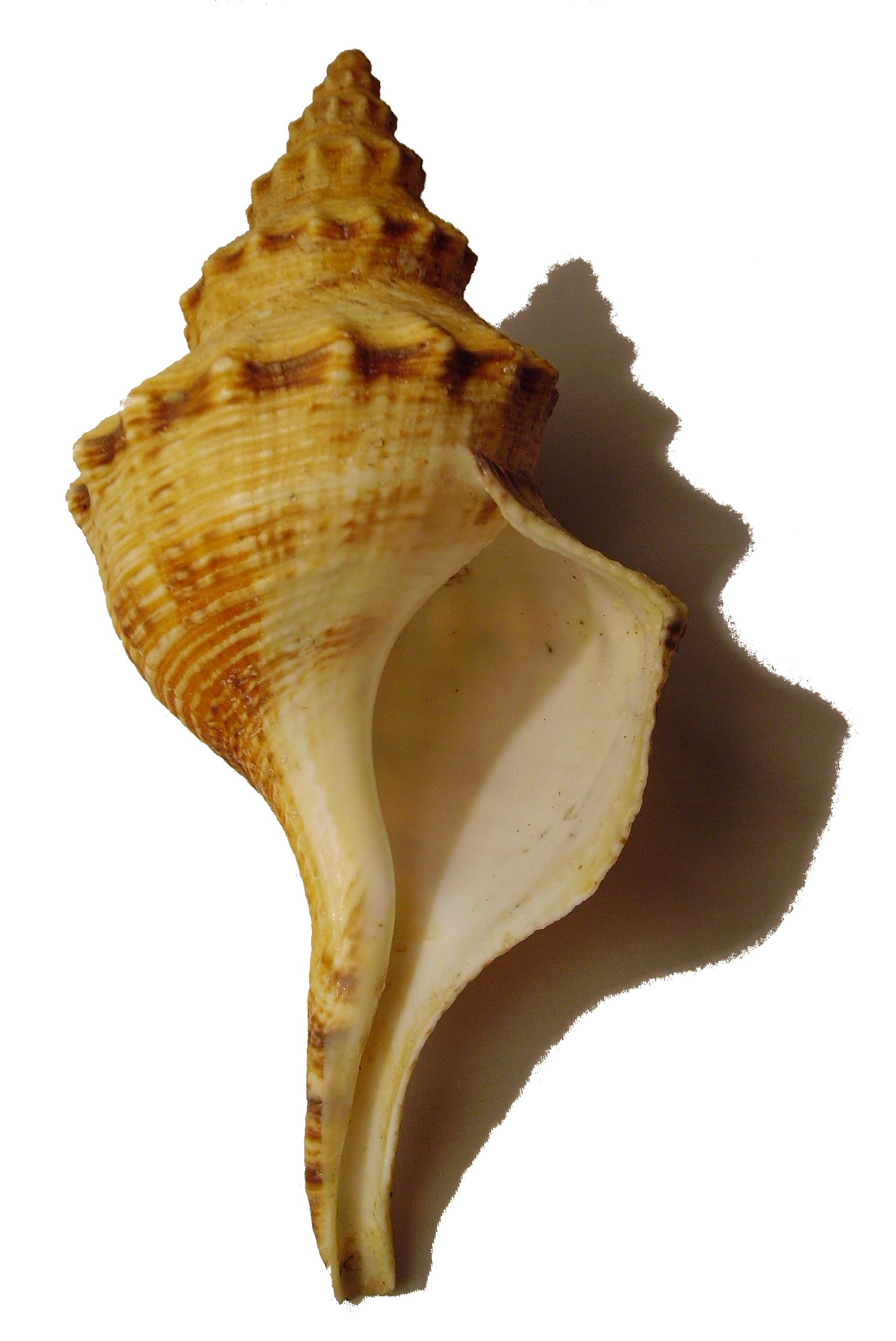
- Apertural view of a shell of Penion maximus, anterior end towards the bottom of the page

Scientific classification
- Kingdom: Animalia
- Phylum: Mollusca
- Class: Gastropoda
- Subclass: Caenogastropoda
- Order: Neogastropoda
- Superfamily: Buccinoidea
- Family: Buccinidae; Rafinesque, 1815

Type genus
- Buccinum Linnaeus, 1758

Genera
- See text

Synonyms
- Cominellidae; Donovaniinae; Cytharinae Thiele, 1929; Mangeliinae P. Fischer, 1883; Oenopotinae Bogdanov, 1987

= Buccinidae =

Family of large sea snails

The Buccinidae are a very large and diverse taxonomic family of large sea snails, often known as whelks or true whelks.

The family includes more than 1500 species.

== Habitat ==
The true whelks occur worldwide in all seas from tropical oceans to the cold seas of the Arctic Ocean and the Southern Ocean. They are found from the intertidal to the bathypelagic zones. Most prefer a solid bottom, but some inhabit sandy substrates.

== Description ==
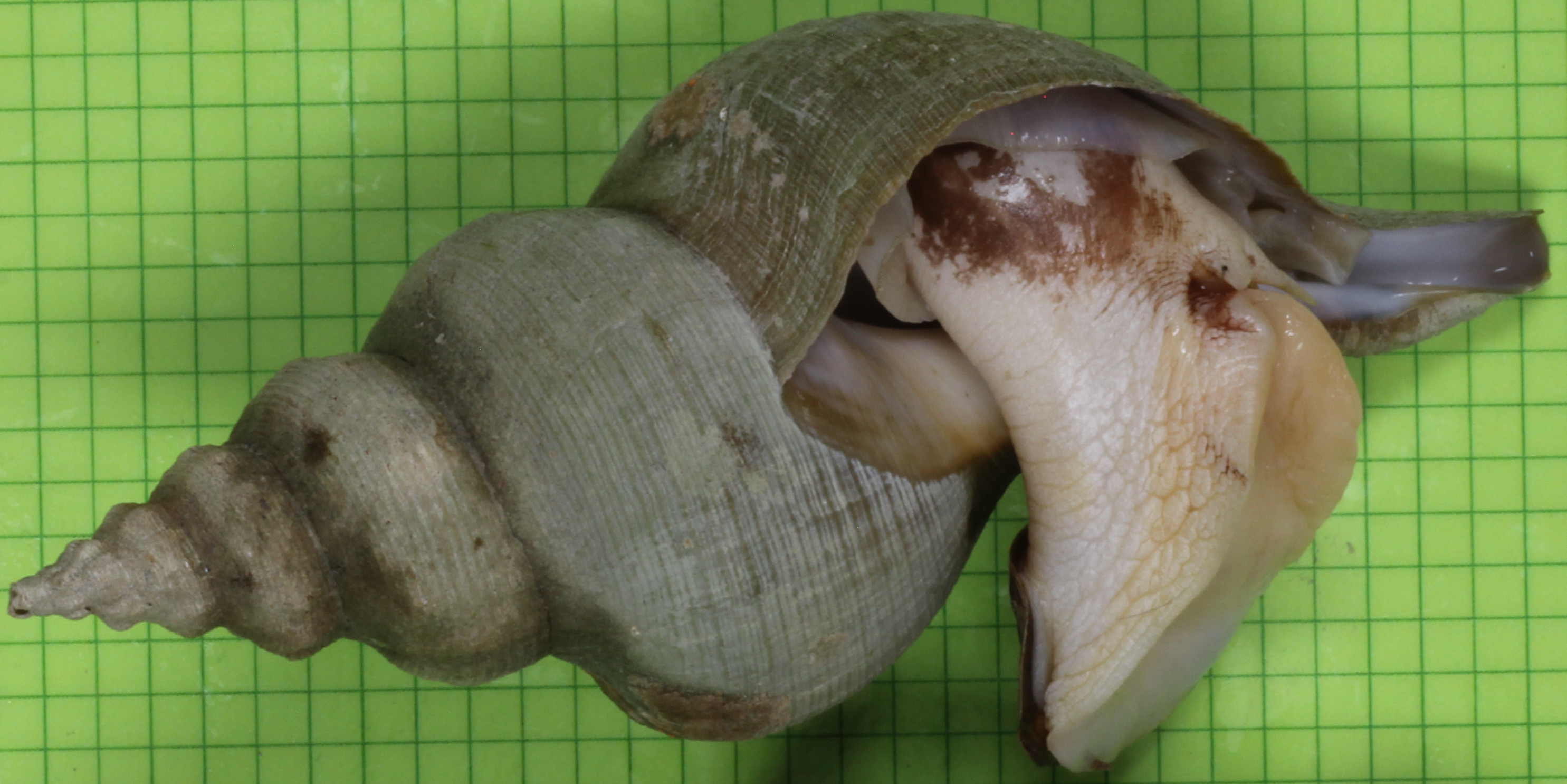
A siphon whelk Penion ormesi, collected from Golden Bay in New Zealand.

The shells of species in this family are moderate to large in size, conical to fusiform in shape. The shell often has deep sutures. The shell surface is generally smooth, sometimes with a spiral and/ or axial sculpture. The thickness of the shell is more pronounced in tropical shallow-water species, while the shell of species living in moderate and colder waters is generally thin or moderately thin. The top of the whorls are more or less shouldered. The radial ribs of the shell sometimes show shoulder knobs. The aperture is large with a well-defined siphonal canal. The rim of the aperture is sometimes used to pry open the shell of bivalves. The aperture is closed by a horny operculum.

The soft body is elongated and spiral. The head has two conical, depressed tentacles which bear the eyes on a lobe or prominence at their base. The mouth contains a long, cylindrical, annulated proboscis and a small tongue. The mantle forms a thin-edged flap over the branchial cavity. On the left side, it has an elongated, open canal, that emerges by a notch or groove in the shell. The two gills are elongated, unequal and pectinate (i.e. in a comb-like arrangement). The large foot is generally broad.

True whelks are carnivores and scavengers. They feed on clams, carrion, and sometimes even on detritus. Their sense of smell is very well-developed; they can sense chemical signals from their prey from a considerable distance with their osphradia. Many whelks are capable of boring through the shell of bivalves, and because of this, some species cause much harm in oyster farms. True whelks can even attack fish caught in a net by extending their probosces to twice the length of their own bodies.

The female whelk lays spongy egg capsules with hundreds of eggs. These form round clusters or a tower-shaped masses. Only about 10% of these eggs hatch. The larvae then feed on the rest of the eggs that have not yet hatched.

The flesh of the common northern whelk, Buccinum undatum, is much appreciated by connoisseurs as a food item, but its consumption is currently somewhat in decline.

The empty shell of a whelk is often used by the hermit crab to make its home.

Buccinum undatum looking for a partner and mating

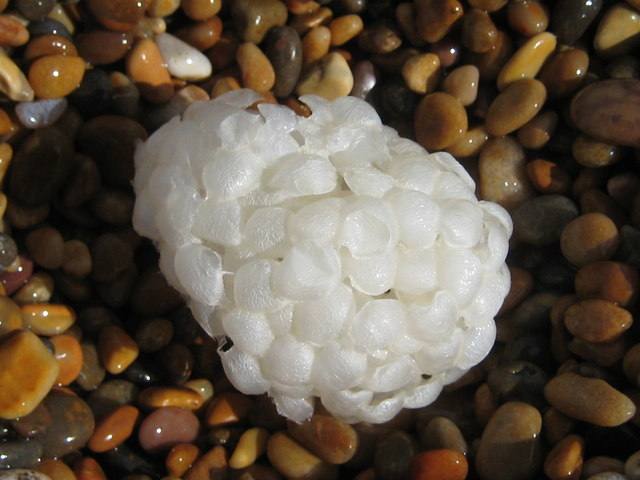
Egg cases of the common whelk (Buccinum undatum)

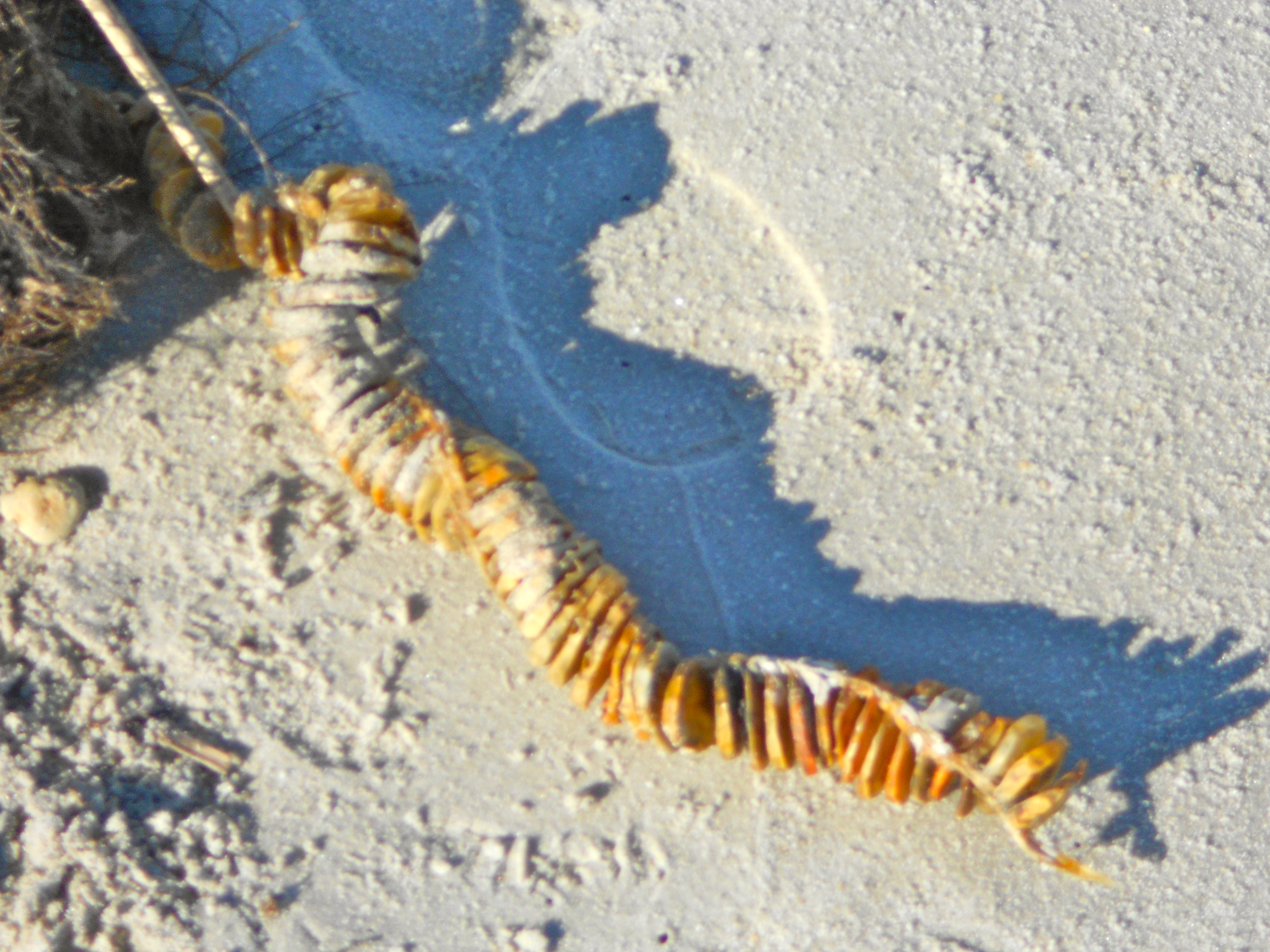
Egg cases of the knobbed whelk (Busycon carica), from Delaware Bay

== Taxonomy ==
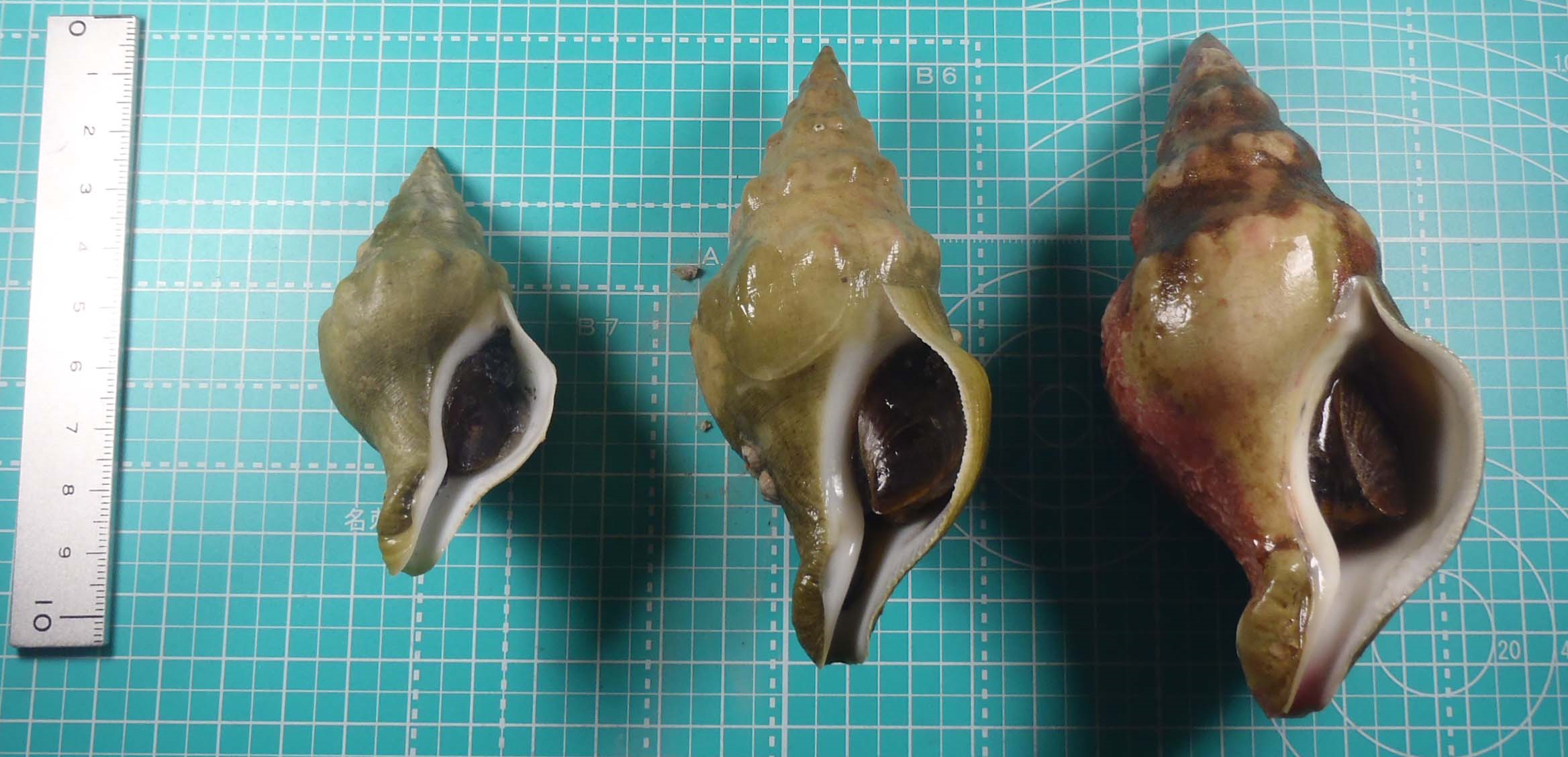
Three Kelletia lischkei whelks from Japan.

The family Busyconidae was for a time treated as a subfamily of Buccinidae called Busyconinae. Genera Antillophos, Engoniophos, Phos, Nassaria, Tomlinia, Anentome and Clea were treated within family Buccinidae, but they were moved to Nassariidae in 2016.

According to the taxonomy of the Gastropoda by Bouchet & Rocroi (2005), followed by a revision in 2022 by Kantor et al., the family Buccinidae consists of six subfamilies:

- Subfamily Buccininae Rafinesque, 1815
- Subfamily Beringiinae Golikov & Starobogatov, 1975
- Subfamily Buccinidae incertae sedis (temporary name)
- Subfamily Busyconinae* Wade, 1917 (1867) : presently, Busyconinae is treated as a synonym of the Busyconidae.
- Subfamily Donovaniinae Casey, 1904 - synonym: Lachesinae L. Bellardi, 1877 (inv.)
- Subfamily Liomesinae P. Fischer, 1884
- Subfamily Neptuneinae W. Stimpson, 1865
- Subfamily Parancistrolepidinae T. Habe, 1972
- Subfamily Siphonaliinae Finlay, 1928 - synonym: Austrosiphonidae Cotton & Godfrey, 1938
- Subfamily Truncariinae Cossmann, 1901
- Subfamily Volutopsiinae Habe & Sato, 1973

The subfamily Pisaniinae was raised to the status of family Pisaniidae in 2009.

=== Genera ===
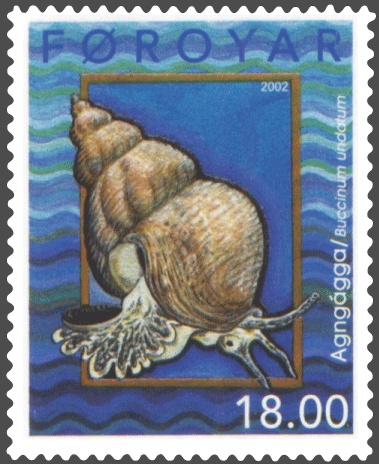
Buccinum undatum on a stamp from the Faroe Islands

Genera within the family Buccinidae include:

Genera not in a family:

- † Accidenticulabrum Vermeij, 2000
- †Atractodon Charlesworth, 1837
- † Buccinofusus Conrad, 1866
- † Eripachya Gabb, 1869
- † Hilda R. Hoernes & Auinger, 1884
- † Laevibuccinum Conrad, 1865
- † Phoracanthus K. Martin, 1914
- † Pirgos De Gregorio, 1885
- † Scalaspira Conrad, 1863
- † Vagantospira Tembrock, 1968

Subfamily Beringiinae

- Aleutijapelion J. H. McLean & R. N. Clark, 2023
- Beringius Dall, 1887
- Exiloberingius J. H. McLean & R. N. Clark, 2023
- Metajapelion Goryachev, 1987
- Neoberingius T. Habe & Ki. Ito, 1965

Subfamily Buccininae

- Aleutibuccinum J. H. McLean & R. N. Clark, 2023
- Buccinum Linnaeus, 1758
- Castaneobuccinum J. H. McLean & R. N. Clark, 2023
- Plicibuccinum A. N. Golikov & Gulbin, 1977
- Sulcosinus Dall, 1895
- Volutharpa P. Fischer, 1856

Subfamily Buccinidae incertae sedis (temporary name)

- Anomalisipho Dautzenberg & H. Fischer, 1912
- Corneobuccinum Golikov & Gulbin, 1977
- Helicofusus Dall, 1916
- Latisipho Dall, 1916
- Plicifusus Dall, 1902
- † Searlesia Harmer, 1914
- Troschelia Mörch, 1876
- † Zelandiella Finlay, 1926

Subfamily Liomesini P. Fischer, 1884

- Liomesus Stimpson, 1865

Subfamily Neptuneinae W. Stimpson, 1865

- Aulacofusus Dall, 1918
- Laevisipho J. H. McLean & R. N. Clark, 2023
- Neptunea Röding, 1798

Subfamily Parancistrolepidinae T. Habe, 1972

- Ancistrolepis Dall, 1895
- Bathyancistrolepis T. Habe & Ki. Ito, 1968
- Boreancistrolepis J. H. McLean & R. N. Clark, 2023
- Clinopegma Grant & Gale, 1931
- Japelion Dall, 1916
- Neancistrolepis Habe & Sato, 1973
- Parancistrolepis Azuma, 1965
- Pseudoliomesus Habe & Sato, 1973
- Thalassoplanes Dall, 1908

Subfamily Siphonaliinae Finlay, 1928

- Bayerius Olsson, 1971
- Japeuthria Iredale, 1918
- Mohnia Friele in Kobelt, 1879
- Pararetifusus Kosuge, 1967
- Phaenomenella Fraussen, 2006
- Siphonalia A. Adams, 1863

Subfamily Truncariinae Cossmann, 1901

- Truncaria A. Adams & Reeve, 1850

Subfamily Volutopsiinae Habe & Sato, 1973

- Crebrivolutopsius J. H. McLean & R. N. Clark, 2023
- Habevolutopsius Kantor, 1983
- Lussivolutopsius Kantor, 1983
- Pyrolofusus Mörch, 1869
- Volutopsius Mörch, 1857

subfamily ?

- † Boreokelletia Anderson, 1964
- Limatofusus Vaught, 1989
- Ornatoconcha Lus, 1987: this is a nomen nudum that belongs to the temporary family Buccinoidea incertae sedis

== Synonyms ==
A long list
- Acamptochetus Cossmann, 1901: synonym of Metula H. Adams & A. Adams, 1853
- Adansonia Pallary, 1902: synonym of Chauvetia Monterosato, 1884
- Agassitula Olsson & Bayer, 1972: synonym of Metula H. Adams & A. Adams, 1853
- Anomalosipho: synonym of Anomalisipho Dautzenberg & H. Fischer, 1912
- Antemetula Rehder, 1943: synonym of Metula H. Adams & A. Adams, 1853
- Antimitra Iredale, 1917: synonym ofMetula H. Adams & A. Adams, 1853
- Barbitonia Dall, 1916: synonym of Neptunea (Barbitonia) Dall, 1916 represented as Neptunea Röding, 1798
- Bathybuccinum Golikov & Sirenko, 1989: synonym of Buccinum Linaeus, 1758
- Bathyclionella Kobelt, 1905: synonym of Belomitra P. Fischer, 1883
- Beringion Habe & Ito, 1965: synonym of Beringius Dall, 1887
- Boreofusus G.O. Sars, 1878: synonym of Troschelia Mörch, 1876
- Brevisiphonia Lus, 1973: synonym of Thalassoplanes Dall, 1908
- Buccinopsis Jeffreys, 1867: synonym of Liomesus Stimpson, 1865
- Calliloncha Lus, 1978: synonym of Bayerius Olsson, 1971
- Chauvetiella F. Nordsieck, 1968: synonym of Chauvetia Monterosato, 1884
- Chrysodomus Swainson, 1840: synonym of Neptunea Röding, 1798
- Colicryptus Iredale, 1918: synonym of Turrisipho Dautzenberg & H. Fischer, 1912
- Colubrarina Kuroda & Habe in Kuroda, Habe & Oyama, 1971: synonym of Metula H. Adams & A. Adams, 1853
- Costaria A. N. Golikov, 1977: synonym of Neptunea Röding, 1798
- Cryptomitra Dall, 1924: synonym of Belomitra P. Fischer, 1883
- Dellina Beu, 1970: synonym of Belomitra P. Fischer, 1883
- Donovania Bucquoy, Dautzenberg & Dollfus, 1883: synonym of Chauvetia Monterosato, 1884
- Donovaniella F. Nordsieck, 1968: synonym of Chauvetia Monterosato, 1884
- Echinosipho Kaiser, 1977: synonym of Americominella Klappenbach & Ureta, 1972
- Floritula Olsson & Bayer, 1972: synonym of Metula H. Adams & A. Adams, 1853
- Folineaea Monterosato, 1884: synonym of Chauvetia Monterosato, 1884
- Fulgur Montfort, 1810: synonym of Busycon Röding, 1798
- Golikovia Habe & Sato, 1973: synonym of Neptunea (Golikovia) Habe & Sato, 1973 accepted as Neptunea Röding, 1798
- Harpofusus Habe & Ito, 1965: synonym of Pyrolofusus Mörch, 1869
- Hypojapelion Okutani, 1968 : synonym of Japelion (Hypojapelion) Okutani, 1968 represented as Japelion Dall, 1916 (superseded rank)
- Jumala Friele, 1882: synonym of Beringius Dall, 1887
- Kapala Ponder, 1982: synonym of Buccipagoda Ponder, 2010
- Lachesis Risso, 1826: synonym of Chauvetia Monterosato, 1884
- Limatofusus Dall, 1918: synonym of Latisipho Dall, 1916
- Mada Jeffreys, 1867: synonym of Buccinum Linnaeus, 1758
- Madiella Wenz, 1943: synonym of Buccinum Linnaeus, 1758
- Mala Cossmann, 1901: synonym of Buccinum Linnaeus, 1758
- Minitula Olsson & Bayer, 1972: synonym of Metula H. Adams & A. Adams, 1853
- Morrisonella Bartsch, 1945: synonym of Belomitra P. Fischer, 1883
- Neptunia Locard, 1886: synonym of Neptunea Röding, 1798
- Nesaea Risso, 1826: synonym of Chauvetia Monterosato, 1884
- Ovulatibuccinum Golikov & Sirenko, 1989: synonym of Buccinum Linnaeus, 1758
- Paracalliloncha Lus, 1987: synonym of Bayerius Olsson, 1971
- Parasipho Dautzenberg & H. Fischer, 1912: synonym of Plicifusus Dall, 1902
- Pleurobela Monterosato in Locard, 1897: synonym of Belomitra P. Fischer, 1883
- Quasisipho Petrov, 1982: synonym of Plicifusus Dall, 1902
- * Reticubuccinum Ito & Habe, 1980: synonym of Buccinum Linnaeus, 1758
- Sipho Mörch, 1852: synonym of Colus Röding, 1798
- Siphonorbis Mörch, 1869: synonym of Colus Röding, 1798
- Strombella Gray, 1857: synonym of Volutopsius Mörch, 1857
- Syntagma Iredale, 1918: synonym of Chauvetia Monterosato, 1884
- Tacita Lus, 1971: synonym of Bayerius Olsson, 1971
- Tritonellium Valenciennes, 1858: synonym of Tritonium O. F. Müller, 1776 accepted as Buccinum Linnaeus, 1758 (unnecessary replacement name for Tritonium O. F. Müller, 1776, by Valenciennes considered a homonym of Tritonia Cuvier)
- Tritonidea Swainson, 1840: synonym of Cantharus Röding, 1798
- Thysanobuccinum A. N. Golikov & Gulbin, 1980: synonym of Buccinum Linnaeus, 1758
- Tritonium O.F. Müller, 1776: synonym of Buccinum Linnaeus, 1758
- Tritonofusus Beck, 1847: synonym of Colus Röding, 1798
- Turrivolutopsius Tiba & Kosuge, 1979: synonym of Volutopsius Mörch, 1857 (unavailable name: no description or diagnosis)
- Ukko Friele, 1893: synonym of Beringius Dall, 1887 (unnecessary nom. nov. pro Jumala Friele, 1882, rejected as "improper";)
- Volutopsion T. Habe & Ki. Ito, 1965: synonym of Volutopsius Mörch, 1857 (junior subjective synonym)
