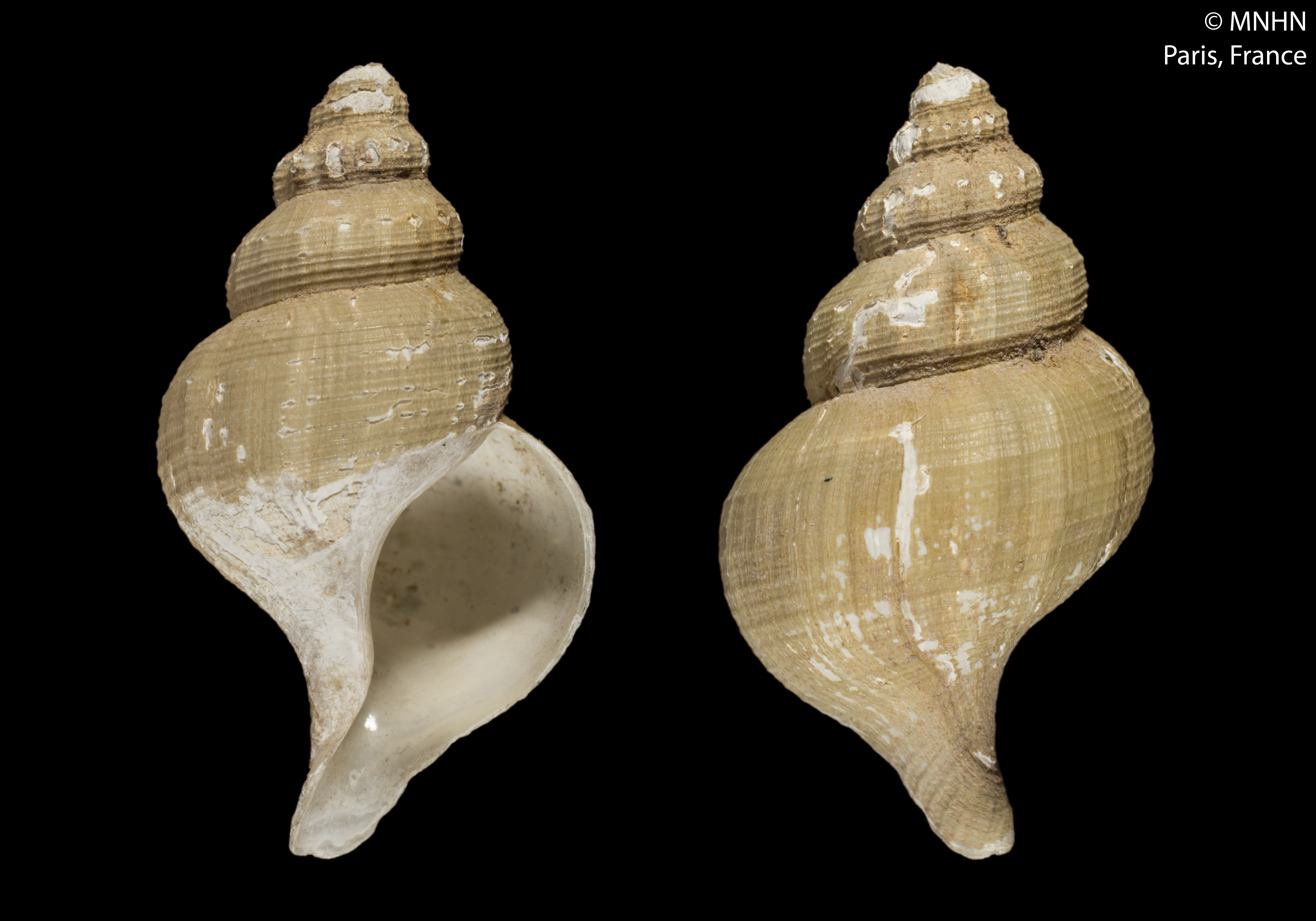
- Shell of Mohnia abyssorum (lectotype at MNHN, Paris)

Scientific classification
- Kingdom: Animalia
- Phylum: Mollusca
- Class: Gastropoda
- Subclass: Caenogastropoda
- Order: Neogastropoda
- Superfamily: Buccinoidea
- Family: Buccinidae
- Genus: Mohnia; Friele, 1879

Type species
- Fusus mohni Friele, 1877

= Mohnia =

Genus of gastropods

Mohnia is a genus of sea snails, marine gastropod mollusks in the subfamily Siphonaliinae of the family Buccinidae, the true whelks.

== Species ==
Species within the genus Mohnia include:

- Mohnia abyssorum (Fischer P., 1883)
- Mohnia blakei (A. E. Verrill, 1885)
- Mohnia carolinensis (Verrill, 1884): synonym of Retimohnia carolinensis (A. E. Verrill, 1884)
- Mohnia danielsseni (Friele, 1879)
- Mohnia krampi (Thorson, 1951)
- Mohnia mohni (Friele, 1877)
- Mohnia parva (Verrill & Smith, 1882)
- Mohnia simplex (Verrill, 1884)

Species brought into synonymy

- Mohnia (Tacita): synonym of Tacita Lus, 1971
- Mohnia attenuata Golikov & Gulbin, 1977: synonym of Retifusus attenuatus (Golikov & Gulbin, 1977)
- Mohnia bella (Ozaki, 1958): synonym of Retimohnia bella (Ozaki, 1958)
- Mohnia buccinoides Dall, 1913: synonym of Retimohnia buccinoides (Dall, 1913)
- Mohnia caelata (Verrill & Smith, 1880): synonym of Retimohnia caelata (Verrill, 1880)
- Mohnia corbis Dall, 1913: synonym of Fusipagoda corbis (Dall, 1913)
- Mohnia daphnelloides Okutani, 1964: synonym of Retimohnia daphnelloides (Okutani, 1964)
- Mohnia exquisita Dall, 1913: synonym of Fusipagoda exquisita (Dall, 1913)
- Mohnia frielei Dall, 1891: synonym of Retimohnia frielei (Dall, 1891)
- Mohnia glypta (Verrill, 1882): synonym of Retimohnia glypta (A. E. Verrill, 1882)
- Mohnia iturupa Golikov & Sirenko, 1998: synonym of Retifusus iturupus (Golikov & Sirenko, 1998)
- Mohnia iwateana Tiba, 1981: synonym of Retimohnia bella (Ozaki, 1958)
- Mohnia kaicherae Petuch, 1987: synonym of Manaria fusiformis (Clench & Aguayo, 1941)
- Mohnia kurilana Dall, 1913: synonym of Pseudomohnia kurilana (Dall, 1913) (original combination)
- Mohnia multicostata Habe & Ito, 1965: synonym of Mohnia bella (Ozaki, 1958)
- Mohnia okhotskana Tiba, 1981: synonym of Retifusus olivaceus (Bartsch, 1929)
- Mohnia robusta Dall, 1913: synonym of Retimohnia robusta (Dall, 1913)
- Mohnia similis Golikov & Gulbin, 1977: synonym of Retifusus similis (Golikov & Gulbin, 1977)
- Mohnia toyamana Tiba, 1981: synonym of Retimohnia toyamana (Tiba, 1981)
- Mohnia twateana Tiba, 1981: synonym of Mohnia bella (Ozaki, 1958)
