= Retimohnia =

Scientific classification
- Kingdom: Animalia
- Phylum: Mollusca
- Class: Gastropoda
- Subclass: Caenogastropoda
- Order: Neogastropoda
- Superfamily: Buccinoidea
- Family: Retimohniidae
- Genus: Retimohnia; McLean, 1995

Type species
- Mohnia frielei Dall, W.H., 1891

Genus of gastropods

Retimohnia is a genus of sea snails, marine gastropod molluscs in the family Retimohniidae.

== Species ==
Species within the genus Retimohnia include:

- Retimohnia acadiana Garcia, 2008
- Retimohnia bella (Ozaki, 1958)
- Retimohnia caelata A. E. Verrill, 1880
- Retimohnia clarki (Dall, 1907)
- Retimohnia frielei (Dall, 1891)
- Retimohnia glypta (A. E. Verrill, 1882)
- Retimohnia hondoensis (Dall, 1913)
- Retimohnia lussae Kosyan & Kantor, 2016
- Retimohnia mcleani Kosyan & Kantor, 2016
- Retimohnia micra (Dall, 1907)
- Retimohnia robusta (Dall, 1913)
- Retimohnia sordida (Dall, 1907)
- Retimohnia vernalis (Dall, 1913)

Species brought into synonymy

- Retimohnia buccinoides (Dall, 1913): synonym of Retifusus buccinoides (Dall, 1913)
- Retimohnia carolinensis (A. E. Verrill, 1884): synonym of Mohnia carolinensis (Verrill, 1884)
- Retimohnia clementinus (Dall, 1919): synonym of Limatofusus clementinus (Dall, 1919)
- Retimohnia corbis (Dall, 1913): synonym of Fusipagoda corbis (Dall, 1913)
- Retimohnia daphnelloides (Okutani, 1964): synonym of Retifusus daphnelloides (Okutani, 1964)
- Retimohnia japonica (Dall, 1913): synonym of Retimohnia micra (Dall, 1907)
- Retimohnia laticingulatus (Golikov & Gulbin, 1977): synonym of Retifusus laticingulatus Golikov & Gulbin, 1977
- Retimohnia multicostata (Habe & Ito, 1965): synonym of Mohnia bella (Ozaki, 1958)
- Retimohnia olivacea (Bartsch, 1929): synonym of Retifusus olivaceus (Bartsch, 1929)
- Retimohnia robusta (Dall, 1913): synonym of Mohnia robusta Dall, 1913
- Retimohnia toyamana (Tiba, 1981): synonym of Retifusus toyamanus (Tiba, 1981)
- Retimohnia virens (Dall, 1877): synonym of Retifusus virens (Dall, 1877)
