= Retimohnia micra =

Scientific classification
- Kingdom: Animalia
- Phylum: Mollusca
- Class: Gastropoda
- Subclass: Caenogastropoda
- Order: Neogastropoda
- Family: Retimohniidae
- Genus: Retimohnia
- Species: R. micra

Binomial name
- Retimohnia micra Dall, 1907

Species of gastropod

Retimohnia micra is a species of sea snail, a marine gastropod mollusc in the family Retimohniidae, the true whelks and the like.
