= Retifusus latericeus =

Scientific classification
- Kingdom: Animalia
- Phylum: Mollusca
- Class: Gastropoda
- Subclass: Caenogastropoda
- Order: Neogastropoda
- Family: Retimohniidae
- Genus: Retifusus
- Species: R. latericeus

Binomial name
- Retifusus latericeus (Möller, 1842)

Synonyms
- Colus latericeus (Møller, 1842); Fusus latericeus Møller, 1842 (original combination); Fusus latericeus var. laevis Mörch, 1869; Fusus pellucidus Hancock, 1846; Fusus pullus Reeve, 1848; Neptunea pertenuis Sykes, 1911; Sipho geminostriatus Pfeffer, 1886; Tritonium incarnatum M. Sars, 1851

Species of gastropod

Retifusus latericeus is a species of sea snail, a marine gastropod mollusk in the family Retimohniidae, the true whelks.

== Distribution ==
This species occurs in European waters and in the Northwest Atlantic Ocean.
