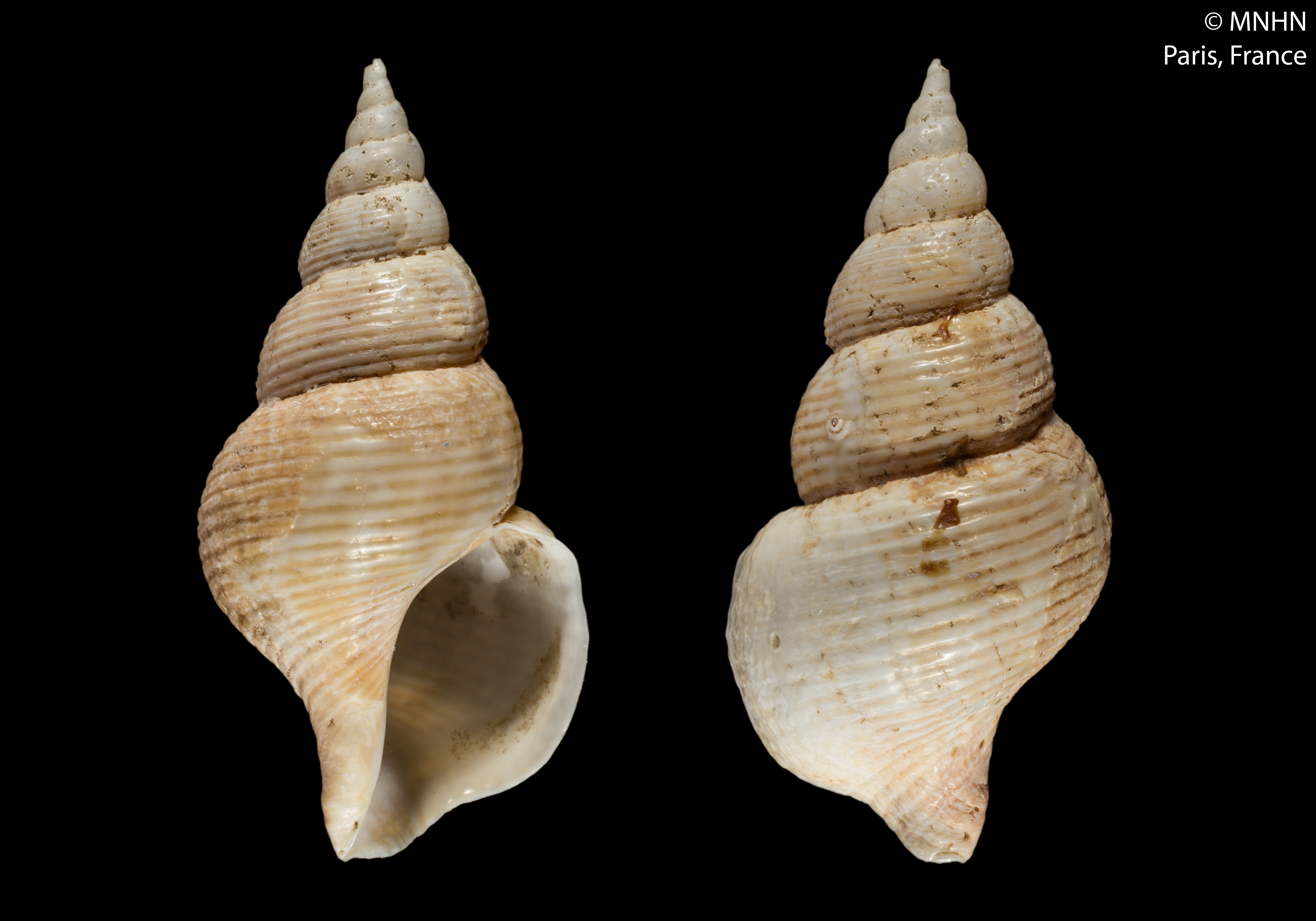
- Aulacofusus brevicauda shell (syntype at MNHN, Paris)

Scientific classification
- Kingdom: Animalia
- Phylum: Mollusca
- Class: Gastropoda
- Subclass: Caenogastropoda
- Order: Neogastropoda
- Family: Buccinidae
- Genus: Aulacofusus
- Species: A. brevicauda

Binomial name
- Aulacofusus brevicauda (Deshayes, 1832)

Synonyms
- List: Aulacofusus schantaricus (Middendorff, 1849); Aulacofusus schantaricus kurilensis Golikov & Gulbin, 1977; Aulacofusus spitzbergensis (Reeve, 1855); Colus (Aulacofusus) schantaricus (Middendorff, 1849) junior subjective synonym; Colus (Aulacofusus) schantaricus kurilensis (A. N. Golikov & Gulbin, 1977)junior subjective synonym; Colus brevicauda (Deshayes, 1832) (basionym); Colus spitzbergensis (Reeve, 1855); Fusus (Sipho) lividus Mörch, 1862 ·; Fusus brevicauda Deshayes, 1832; Fusus lividus Mörch, 1862; Fusus spitzbergensis Reeve, 1855; Neptunea (Sipho) terebralis A. A. Gould, 1860; Neptunea brevicauda (Deshayes, 1832); Neptunea terebralis Gould, 1860; Tritonium schantaricum Middendorff, 1849

= Aulacofusus brevicauda =

Species of gastropod

Aulacofusus brevicauda, common name the thick-ribbed whelk, is a species of sea snail, a marine gastropod mollusc in the family Buccinidae, the true whelks.

Subspecies

- Aulacofusus brevicauda fortilirata (Sowerby III, 1913): synonym of Aulacofusus periscelidus (Dall, 1891) (junior synonym)
- Aulacofusus brevicauda kurilensis ^{A. N. Golikov & Gulbin, 1977}

== Description ==
The length of the shell attains 60 mm, its diameter 25 mm.

(Originally description in Latin of Neptunea (Sipho) terebralis) The shell is elongated and ovato-fusiform in shape. It possesses a reddish-horn coloration and an externally chalky texture, marked by regular longitudinal striations. The surface is encircled by a series of ribs and grooves of subequal width.

The spire consists of approximately eight whorls, though the specimen specifically exhibits 7 1/2 rounded whorls that are distinctly tabulate at their upper margins. The body whorl is well-proportioned, measuring one-third of the total shell length. The aperture is pyriform and terminates in a moderate rostrum. The outer lip is gracefully arched and features small submarginal denticles on the interior. This inner surface is further adorned with reddish streaks that correspond to the external ribs of the shell.

== Distribution ==
This species occurs in Arctic waters.
