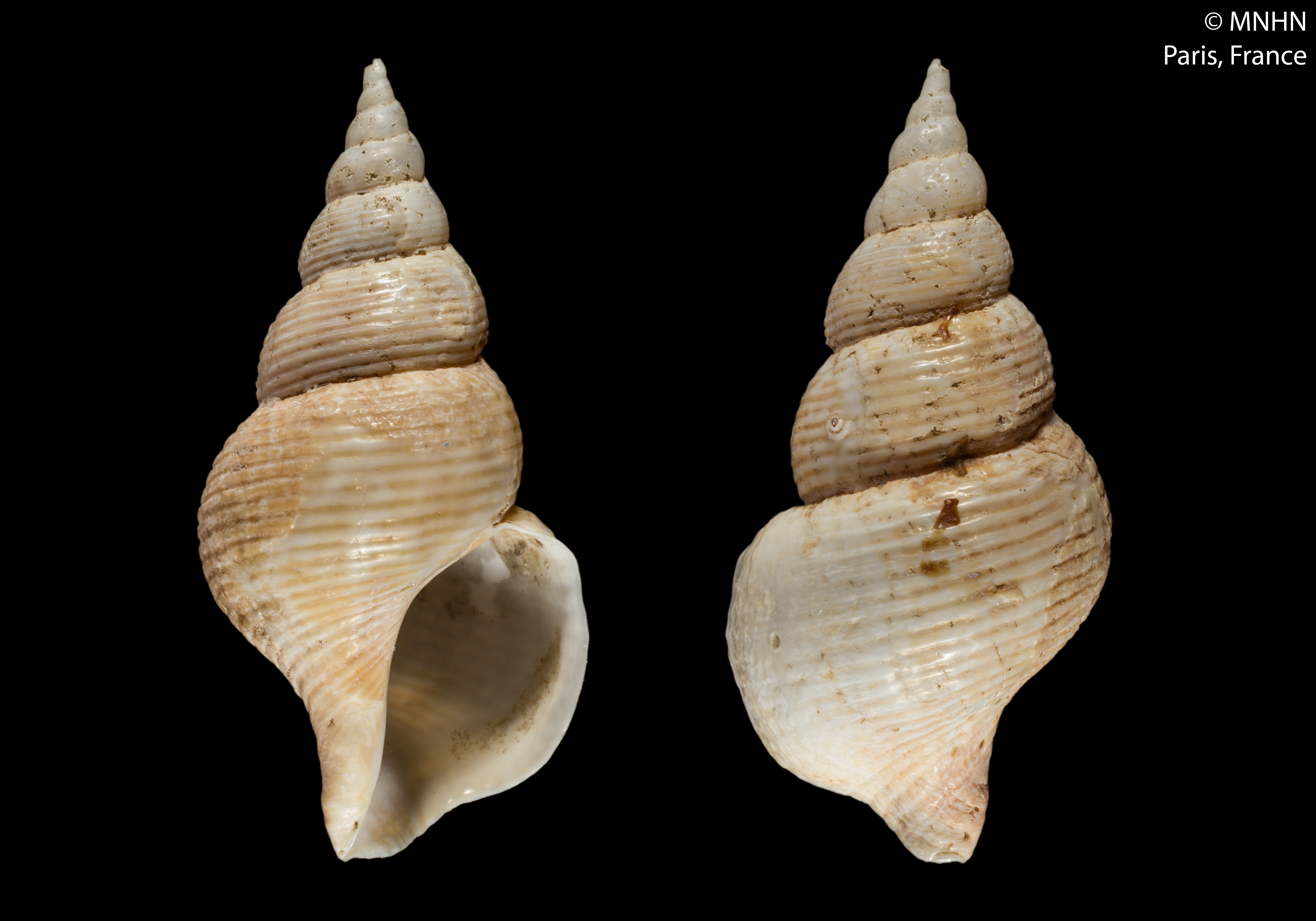
- Aulacofusus brevicauda shell (syntype at MNHN, Paris)

Scientific classification
- Kingdom: Animalia
- Phylum: Mollusca
- Class: Gastropoda
- Subclass: Caenogastropoda
- Order: Neogastropoda
- Superfamily: Buccinoidea
- Family: Buccinidae
- Genus: Aulacofusus; W.H. Dall, 1918

Type species
- Fusus spitzbergensis Reeve, 1855

Species
- See text

Synonyms
- Colus (Aulacofusus) Dall, 1918; Plicifusus (Aulacofusus)

= Aulacofusus =

Genus of gastropods

Aulacofusus is a genus of sea snails, marine gastropod mollusks in the subfamily Neptuneinae of the family Buccinidae, the true whelks.

== General characteristics ==
Another group of species within Colus, typified by Fusus spitzbergensis Reeve (synonym of Aulacofusus brevicauda (Deshayes, 1832)) has a special aspect due to the short siphonal canal and the prominence of the spiral ribs separated by chaneled interspaces. It may be called Aulacofusus

== Species ==
According to the World Register of Marine Species (WoRMS), the following species with valid names are included within the genus Aulacofusus :

- † Aulacofusus asagaiensis (Makiyama, 1934)
- Aulacofusus brevicauda (Deshayes, 1832)
- Aulacofusus calamaeus (Dall, 1907)
- Aulacofusus calathus (Dall, 1919)
- Aulacofusus canaliculatus J. H. McLean & R. N. Clark, 2023
- Aulacofusus coerulescens Kuroda & Habe in Habe, 1961
- Aulacofusus esychus (Dall, 1907)
- Aulacofusus gulbini Kosyan & Kantor, 2013
- Aulacofusus herendeeni (Dall, 1902)
- Aulacofusus hiranoi (Shikama, 1962)
- Aulacofusus ombronius (Dall, 1919)
- Aulacofusus periscelidus (Dall, 1891)
- Aulacofusus tanagaensis J. H. McLean & R. N. Clark, 2023

Taxa inquirenda

- Aulacofusus dimidiatus Dall, 1919
- Aulacofusus trophius Dall, 1919

Species brought into synonymy

- Aulacofusus capponius (Dall, 1919): synonym of Colus pulcius (Dall, 1919)
- Aulacofusus georgianus Dall, 1921: synonym of Latisipho georgianus (Dall, 1921) (superseded combination)
- Aulacofusus halidonus Dall, 1919: synonym of Colus halidonus (Dall, 1919) (original combination)
- Aulacofusus halimeris Dall, 1919: synonym of Colus halimeris (Dall, 1919) (original combination)
- Aulacofusus insulapratasensis Okutani & Lan, 1994: synonym of Phaenomenella insulapratasensis (Okutani & Lan, 1994) (original combination)
- Aulacofusus kurilensis Golikov & Gulbin, 1977: synonym of Aulacofusus brevicauda (Deshayes, 1832)
- Aulacofusus morditus Dall, 1919: synonym of Latisipho morditus (Dall, 1919) (original combination)
- Aulacofusus nobilis (Dall, 1919): synonym of Aulacofusus herendeeni (Dall, 1902)
- Aulacofusus pulcius Dall, 1919: synonym of Colus pulcius (Dall, 1919) (original combination)
- Aulacofusus sapius (Dall, 1919): synonym of Fusipagoda sapia (Dall, 1919)
- Aulacofusus schantaricus (Middendorff, 1849): synonym of Aulacofusus brevicauda (Deshayes, 1832)
- Aulacofusus severinus Dall, 1919: synonym of Latisipho severinus (Dall, 1919) (original combination)
- Aulacofusus spitzbergensis (Reeve, 1855): synonym of Aulacofusus brevicauda (Deshayes, 1832)
- Aulacofusus timetus Dall, 1919: synonym of Latisipho timetus (Dall, 1919) (original combination)
