= Retimohnia acadiana =

Scientific classification
- Kingdom: Animalia
- Phylum: Mollusca
- Class: Gastropoda
- Subclass: Caenogastropoda
- Order: Neogastropoda
- Family: Retimohniidae
- Genus: Retimohnia
- Species: R. acadiana

Binomial name
- Retimohnia acadiana Garcia, 2008

Species of gastropod

Retimohnia acadiana is a species of sea snail, a marine gastropod mollusc in the family Retimohniidae.
