= Retimohnia glypta =

Scientific classification
- Kingdom: Animalia
- Phylum: Mollusca
- Class: Gastropoda
- Subclass: Caenogastropoda
- Order: Neogastropoda
- Family: Retimohniidae
- Genus: Retimohnia
- Species: R. glypta

Binomial name
- Retimohnia glypta (A. E. Verrill, 1882)

Synonyms
- Mohnia glypta (Verrill, 1882); Sipho glyptus Verrill, 1882; Sipho lindahli Posselt & Jensen, 1898

Species of gastropod

Retimohnia glypta is a species of sea snail, a marine gastropod mollusc in the family Retimohniidae.

== Description ==
The shell attains a length of up to 27 mm.

== Distribution ==
This species is distributed in European waters (Iceland, Greenland, Faroes) and in the Northwest Atlantic Ocean (New Jersey).
