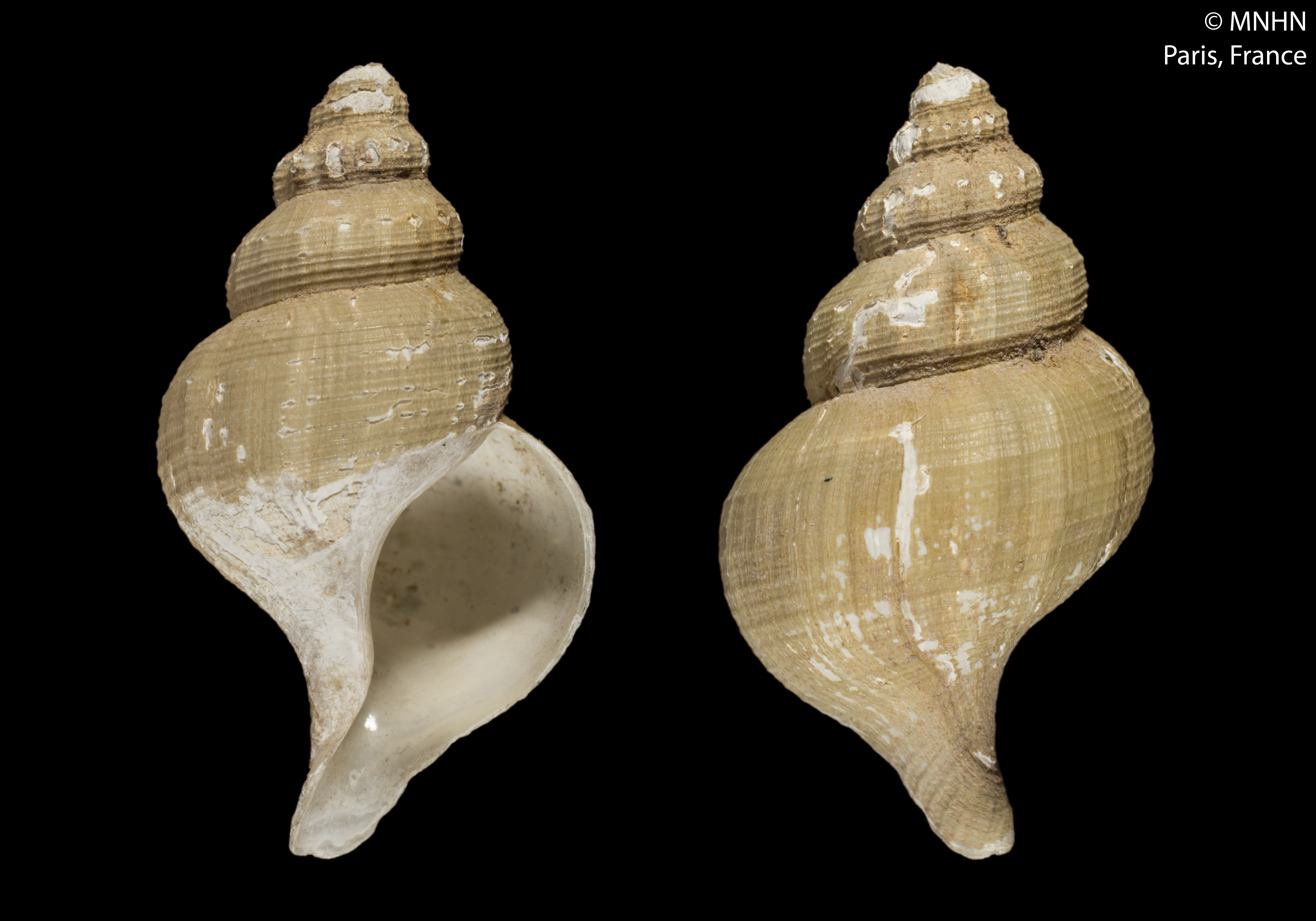
- Shell of Mohnia abyssorum (lectotype at MNHN, Paris)

Scientific classification
- Kingdom: Animalia
- Phylum: Mollusca
- Class: Gastropoda
- Subclass: Caenogastropoda
- Order: Neogastropoda
- Family: Buccinidae
- Genus: Mohnia
- Species: M. abyssorum

Binomial name
- Mohnia abyssorum (P. Fischer, 1883)

Synonyms
- Fusus abyssorum P. Fischer, 1884 (original combination); Sipho hispidulus Verrill, 1885; Sipho profundicola Verrill & S. Smith, 1884; Sipho profundicola var. dispar Verrill & S. Smith, 1884; Tacita abyssorum (P. Fischer, 1884)

= Mohnia abyssorum =

Species of gastropod

Mohnia abyssorum is a species of sea snail, a marine gastropod mollusk in the family Buccinidae, the true whelks.

== Description ==
The length of the shell attains 34.5 mm.

== Distribution ==
This marine species occurs off the Azores.
