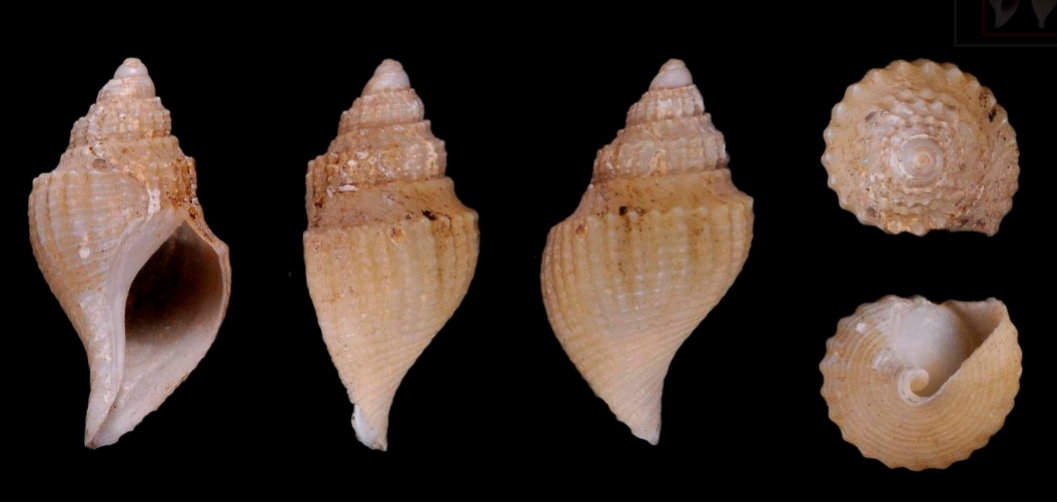
- Shell of Mohnia blakei (holotype at the Smithsonian Institution)

Scientific classification
- Kingdom: Animalia
- Phylum: Mollusca
- Class: Gastropoda
- Subclass: Caenogastropoda
- Order: Neogastropoda
- Family: Buccinidae
- Genus: Mohnia
- Species: M. blakei

Binomial name
- Mohnia blakei (A. E. Verrill, 1885)

Synonyms
- Bela blakei Verrill, 1885

= Mohnia blakei =

Species of gastropod

Mohnia blakei is a species of sea snail, a marine gastropod mollusk in the family Buccinidae, the true whelks.

== Description ==
The length of the shell attains 16 mm, its width 8 mm.

(Original description of Bela blakei) Shell of good size for the genus, stout, fusiform, with turreted spire and shouldered whorls, having a circle of nodules just below the suture and another at the shoulder. The shell contains 5½ whorls, of which three belong to the protoconch, which is rather large, regularly coiled, the apical whorl rather small, a little depressed, white and polished. The second whorl is also polished, but crossed by very fine lines of growth. The last nuclear whorl has about five raised, revolving cinguli in addition to the lines of growth. The lower whorls are crossed by numerous rather straight, obtuse ribs, separated by intervals of about their own breadth. Of these there are about twenty-four on the body whorl. Each of these ribs rises into a rounded, rather prominent tubercle at the shoulder. They are faintly marked and oblique on the concave subsutural band, but form another circle of obtuse tubercles just below the suture. Anteriorly they fade out at about the middle of the body whorl. The suture itself is impressed and undulated. The surface, both of the ribs and intervals, is covered by close but distinct lines of growth. At the shoulder a distinct revolving carina connects the tubercles together. Below this there are pretty regular, well-developed revolving cinguli, which are rounded and separated by rather wide intervals, and cross both ribs and interspaces, but in crossing the ribs they become more prominent and form oblong nodules on the upper part of the whorl. On the lower part of the whorl and siphon they are a little wider, more spaced, and roughened only by the raised lines of growth. On the penultimate whorl there are three or four revolving cinguli below the carina. The subsutural band is strongly marked, broad and decidedly concave, and is covered with slightly curved, oblique lines of growth and faint ribs, and has a single, small, revolving cingulus in the middle. The aperture is long, ovate-fusiform, angulated at the outer lip, and with an acute posterior angle; anteriorly it is narrowed into the moderately long straight canal. The posterior sinus is nearly obsolete. The columella is straight, with a sinuous inner margin. The operculum is greenish yellow, ovate, obtusely rounded posteriorly, subspiral anteriorly, with the nucleus near the inner anterior edge. The epidermis is pale yellow, thin, closely adherent. The color of the shell within is bluish white. The nucleus is white.

== Distribution ==
This species occurs in the Northwest Atlantic Ocean on shallow benthic sediments.
