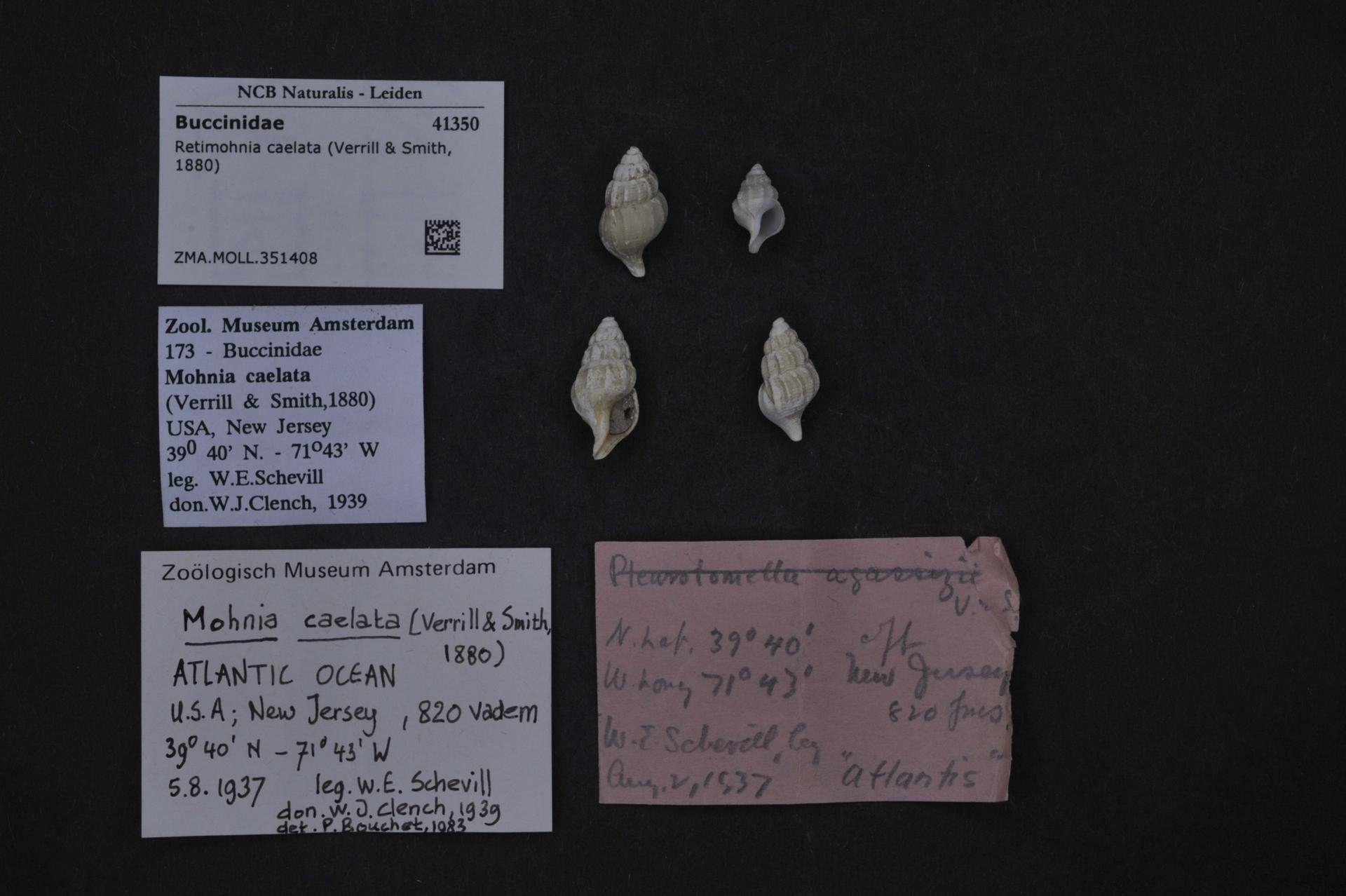
- Shells of Retimohnia caelata

Scientific classification
- Kingdom: Animalia
- Phylum: Mollusca
- Class: Gastropoda
- Subclass: Caenogastropoda
- Order: Neogastropoda
- Family: Retimohniidae
- Genus: Retimohnia
- Species: R. caelata

Binomial name
- Retimohnia caelata (A. E. Verrill & S. I. Smith, 1880)

Synonyms
- Colus caelatus (A. E. Verrill, 1880); Colus obesus (A. E. Verrill, 1884); Mohnia caelata (Verrill & S. I. Smith, 1880); Neptunea (Sipho) caelata Verrill, 1880; Neptunea obesus Verrill, A.E., 1884; Sipho caelatulus Verrill, 1884; Sipho caelatus (Verrill & Smith, 1880); Sipho caelatus var. hebes Verrill, 1884; Sipho hebes Verrill, 1884; Sipho obesus Verrill, 1884

= Retimohnia caelata =

Species of gastropod

Retimohnia caelata is a species of sea snail, a marine gastropod mollusc in the family Retimohniidae. It has a fusiform shell with 12 axial ribs per whorl.

== Distribution ==
Retimohnia caelata is found along the North American continental slope of the Atlantic Ocean from North Carolina (U.S.) to Iceland at depths from 1000 to 2500 meters.

== Taxonomy ==
Retimohnia caelata's position in the taxonomic tree has gone through several revisions. It was originally placed in the genus Neptunea by A.E. Verrill. Over the next few decades, N. caelata would also be placed in Colus and Sipho. In 1985, Bouchet et.al. placed it in genus Mohnia where it stayed until 1995 when McLean devised a new genus, Retimohnia, that included 10 species taken from several closely related genera, including N. caelata, now named R. caelata.
