= Retifusus similis =

Scientific classification
- Kingdom: Animalia
- Phylum: Mollusca
- Class: Gastropoda
- Subclass: Caenogastropoda
- Order: Neogastropoda
- Family: Retimohniidae
- Genus: Retifusus
- Species: R. similis

Binomial name
- Retifusus similis Golikov & Gulbin, 1977

Species of gastropod

Retifusus similis is a species of sea snail, a marine gastropod mollusc in the family Retimohniidae, the true whelks and the like.
