= Aulacofusus gulbini =

Scientific classification
- Kingdom: Animalia
- Phylum: Mollusca
- Class: Gastropoda
- Subclass: Caenogastropoda
- Order: Neogastropoda
- Family: Buccinidae
- Genus: Aulacofusus
- Species: A. gulbini

Binomial name
- Aulacofusus gulbini Kosyan & Kantor, 2013

Species of gastropod

Aulacofusus gulbini is a species of sea snail, a marine gastropod mollusc in the family Buccinidae, the true whelks.

== Description ==
The length of the shell shell attains 73.7 mm.

== Distribution ==
This marine species occurs near the Kuril Islands.
