= Fusipagoda =

Scientific classification
- Kingdom: Animalia
- Phylum: Mollusca
- Class: Gastropoda
- Subclass: Caenogastropoda
- Order: Neogastropoda
- Superfamily: Buccinoidea
- Family: Retimohniidae
- Genus: Fusipagoda; Habe & Ki. Ito, 1965

Type species
- Mohnia exquisita Dall, 1913

Genus of gastropods

Fusipagoda is a genus of sea snails, marine gastropod mollusks in the family Retimohniidae, the true whelks and the like.

== Species ==
- Fusipagoda corbis (Dall, 1913)
- Fusipagoda exquisita (Dall, 1913)
- Fusipagoda itohabei Kosyan & Kantor, 2015
- Fusipagoda sapia (Dall, 1919)
