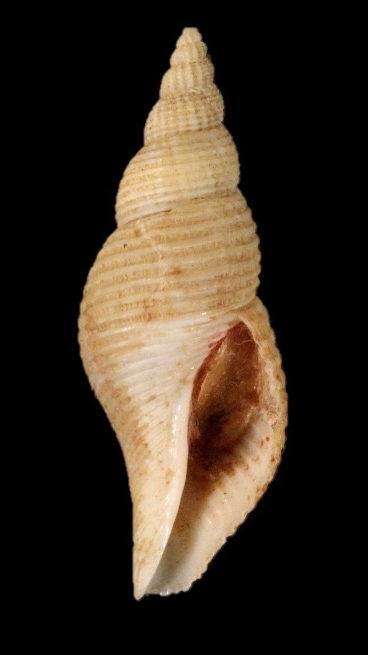
- Shell of Aulacofusus coerulescens (specimen at Naturalis Biodiversity Center)

Scientific classification
- Kingdom: Animalia
- Phylum: Mollusca
- Class: Gastropoda
- Subclass: Caenogastropoda
- Order: Neogastropoda
- Family: Buccinidae
- Genus: Aulacofusus
- Species: A. coerulescens

Binomial name
- Aulacofusus coerulescens JKuroda & T. Habe, 1961

= Aulacofusus coerulescens =

Species of gastropod

Aulacofusus coerulescens is a species of sea snail, a marine gastropod mollusc in the family Buccinidae, the true whelks.

== Distribution ==
This marine species occurs near Japan, Taiwan and the Philippines.
