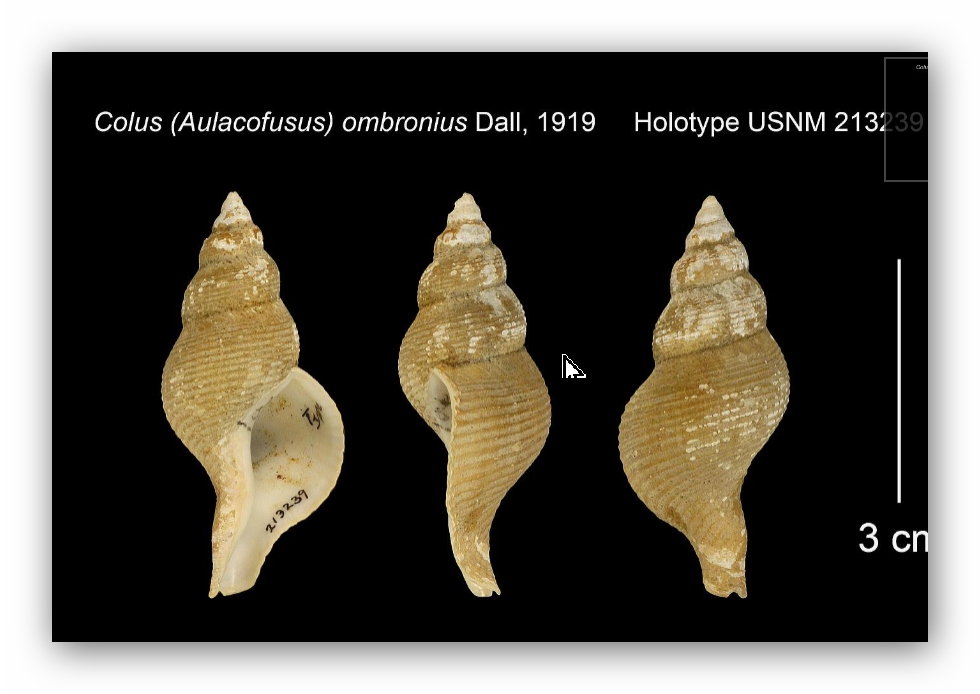
- Shell of Aulacofusus ombronius (holotype at the Smithsonian Institution)

Scientific classification
- Kingdom: Animalia
- Phylum: Mollusca
- Class: Gastropoda
- Subclass: Caenogastropoda
- Order: Neogastropoda
- Superfamily: Buccinoidea
- Family: Buccinidae
- Genus: Aulacofusus
- Species: A. ombronius

Binomial name
- Aulacofusus ombronius (Dall, 1902)

Synonyms
- Colus ombronius Dall, 1919 (original combination)

= Aulacofusus ombronius =

Species of gastropod

Aulacofusus ombronius is a species of sea snail, a marine gastropod mollusc in the family Buccinidae, the true whelks.

== Description ==
(Original description) The shell is of moderate size with a length of 50 mm. It is white with a dull olive gray periostracum. It contains more than six well-rounded whorls.The protoconch is missing. The aperture with a length of 30 mm is longer than the spire. The suture is distinct and not appressed. The axial sculpture consists of rather strong, regular and regularly spaced incremental lines which minutely corrugate the spirals. The spiral sculpture consists of (on the penultimate whorl about a dozen) flattish ribs, equal and equally spaced with much narrower interspace. On the body whorl, especially near the periphery, these ribs have a tendency to become keeled and the interspaces wider. The aperture is ovate and simple. It is 30 mm wide. The outer lip is slightly expanded and reflects the external sculpture. The throat is white. The inner lip is enameled. The columella is twisted and almost pervious. The siphonal canal is two-thirds as long as the rest of the aperture and is well recurved.

== Distribution ==
This species occurs in the Bering Sea and off the Pribilof Islands.
