= Aulacofusus hiranoi =

Scientific classification
- Kingdom: Animalia
- Phylum: Mollusca
- Class: Gastropoda
- Subclass: Caenogastropoda
- Order: Neogastropoda
- Family: Buccinidae
- Genus: Aulacofusus
- Species: A. hiranoi

Binomial name
- Aulacofusus hiranoi (Shikama, 1962)

Synonyms
- Colus calamaeus hiranoi Shikama, 1962 (original combination)

Species of gastropod

Aulacofusus hiranoi is a species of sea snail, a marine gastropod mollusc in the family Buccinidae, the true whelks.

== Distribution ==
This marine species occurs off Japan.
