= Mohnia krampi =

Scientific classification
- Kingdom: Animalia
- Phylum: Mollusca
- Class: Gastropoda
- Subclass: Caenogastropoda
- Order: Neogastropoda
- Family: Buccinidae
- Genus: Mohnia
- Species: M. krampi

Binomial name
- Mohnia krampi (Thorson, 1951)

Species of gastropod

Mohnia krampi is a species of sea snail, a marine gastropod mollusk in the family Buccinidae, the true whelks.
