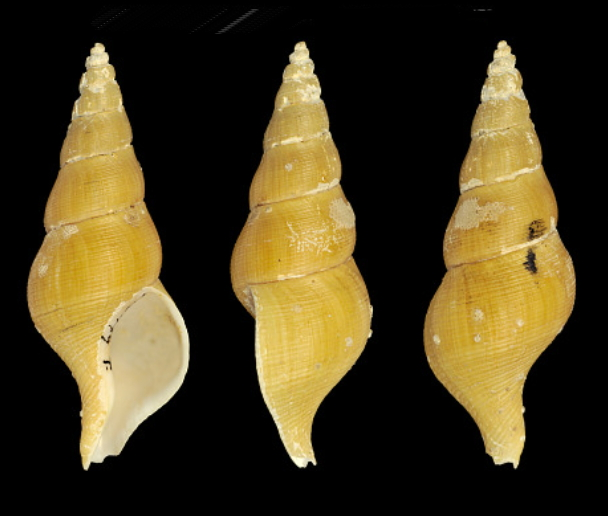
- Shell of Aulacofusus esychus (holotype at the Smithsonian Institution)

Scientific classification
- Kingdom: Animalia
- Phylum: Mollusca
- Class: Gastropoda
- Subclass: Caenogastropoda
- Order: Neogastropoda
- Family: Buccinidae
- Genus: Aulacofusus
- Species: A. esychus

Binomial name
- Aulacofusus esychus (Dall, 1907)

Synonyms
- Colus esychus (Dall, 1907); Sipho esychus (Dall, 1907); Tritonofusus esychus Dall, 1907 · unaccepted (original combination)

= Aulacofusus esychus =

Species of gastropod

Aulacofusus esychus is a species of sea snail, a marine gastropod mollusc in the family Buccinidae, the true whelks.

Subspecies

- Aulacofusus esychus esychus (Dall, 1907)
- Aulacofusus esychus shikotanicus (A. N. Golikov & Gulbin, 1977)

== Description ==
The length of the shell attains 52 mm, its diameter 21 mm.

(Original description) The shell is slender, solid, and acute, possessing a distinct pinkish-brown coloration. It consists of approximately eight moderately convex whorls. While the apex is acute, it typically appears more or less eroded, and the suture is not deeply constricted.

The sculpture is composed of numerous fine, narrow, and flattish spiral ridges that exhibit a tendency to form pairs. These ridges are separated by narrow interspaces that are notably not channeled. Overall, the sculpture is distinct without being overly prominent. On the penultimate whorl, there are approximately 25 spirals, about one-third of which are rendered duplex by a fine medial groove.

The aperture is ovate and displays a livid pink interior, while the outer lip is slightly reflected. The columella is slender and strongly twisted, appearing almost pervious. Finally, the siphonal canal is contracted and notably recurved at its anterior end.

== Distribution ==
This species occurs in arctic waters of Bering Island, Bering Sea.
