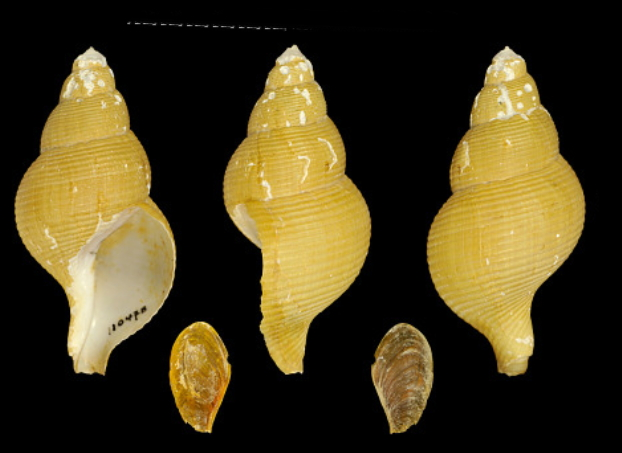
- Shell of Aulacofusus calamaeus (holotype at the Smithsonian Institution)

Scientific classification
- Kingdom: Animalia
- Phylum: Mollusca
- Class: Gastropoda
- Subclass: Caenogastropoda
- Order: Neogastropoda
- Family: Buccinidae
- Genus: Aulacofusus
- Species: A. calamaeus

Binomial name
- Aulacofusus calamaeus (Dall, 1907)

= Aulacofusus calamaeus =

Species of gastropod

Aulacofusus calamaeus is a species of sea snail, a marine gastropod mollusc in the family Buccinidae, the true whelks.

== Description ==
The length of the shell (tip eroded) attains 57 mm, its diameter 28 mm.

(Originally description) The shell is thin and white, though it is covered by a distinct straw-yellow periostracum. It consists of approximately six well-rounded whorls separated by a very distinct suture. While the protoconch appears small, the apex of the specimen is eroded.

The sculpture is entirely spiral in nature. On the penultimate whorl, between the sutures, there are 12 flattish, low, and equal spiral ridges. these ridges are slightly rounded and separated by narrower, subequal, channeled interspaces. The entire surface is crossed only by faint incremental lines of growth.

The aperture is a lustrous milk-white, while the body whorl features a polished, eroded area near the opening. The columella is thick and white, appearing twisted and recurved toward the anterior end. The siphonal canal is wide and short, notably lacking a siphonal fasciole. The outer lip is thin and characterized by a slightly reflected margin.

== Distribution ==
This species occurs in arctic waters of the northwestern Pacific Ocean (Japan, Russian Federation)
