= Mohnia simplex =

Scientific classification
- Kingdom: Animalia
- Phylum: Mollusca
- Class: Gastropoda
- Subclass: Caenogastropoda
- Order: Neogastropoda
- Family: Buccinidae
- Genus: Mohnia
- Species: M. simplex

Binomial name
- Mohnia simplex (Verrill, 1884)

Species of gastropod

Mohnia simplex is a species of sea snail, a marine gastropod mollusk in the family Buccinidae, the true whelks.
