= Aulacofusus canaliculatus =

Scientific classification
- Kingdom: Animalia
- Phylum: Mollusca
- Class: Gastropoda
- Subclass: Caenogastropoda
- Order: Neogastropoda
- Family: Buccinidae
- Genus: Aulacofusus
- Species: A. canaliculatus

Binomial name
- Aulacofusus canaliculatus J. H. McLean & R. N. Clark, 2023

Species of gastropod

Aulacofusus canaliculatus is a species of sea snail, a marine gastropod mollusc in the family Buccinidae, the true whelks.

== Description ==
The length of the shell attains 66.6 mm.

== Distribution ==
This species occurs in arctic waters near Agattu Island, Aleutian Is, Alaska.
