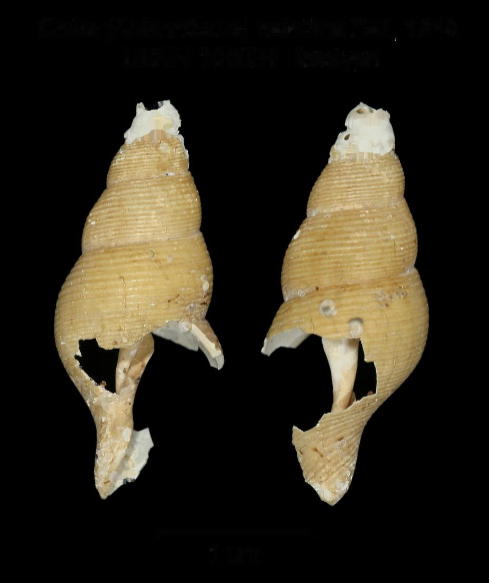
- Shell of Aulacofusus calathus (holotype at the Smithsonian Institution)

Scientific classification
- Kingdom: Animalia
- Phylum: Mollusca
- Class: Gastropoda
- Subclass: Caenogastropoda
- Order: Neogastropoda
- Superfamily: Buccinoidea
- Family: Buccinidae
- Genus: Aulacofusus
- Species: A. calathus

Binomial name
- Aulacofusus calathus Dall, 1919

Synonyms
- Colus calathus Dall, 1919; Colus (Aulacofusus) calathus Dall, 1919

= Aulacofusus calathus =

Species of gastropod

Aulacofusus calathus is a species of sea snail, a marine gastropod mollusc in the family Buccinidae, the true whelks.

== Description ==
(Original description of Colus (Aulacofusus) calathus) The small, thin shell measures 26 mm. It is white under a straw-colored periostracum. The shell contains more than six well-rounded whorls; the protoconch is defective. The suture is distinct and not appressed. The axial sculpture consists of faint incremental striae. The spiral sculpture consists of (on the penultimate whorl 13) fine rounded low subequal ribs with narrower interspace. The ribs at and below the periphery are a little more close-set. This sculpture covers the whole shell very evenly. The aperture is wide and measures 12 mm. The outer lip is thickened and slightly crenulated by the external sculpture. The body is erased. The columella is short and attenuated in front. The short siphonal canal is wide and slightly recurved.

== Distribution ==
This marine species occurs near the Shumagin Islands, Alaska.
