= Retifusus =

Scientific classification
- Kingdom: Animalia
- Phylum: Mollusca
- Class: Gastropoda
- Subclass: Caenogastropoda
- Order: Neogastropoda
- Superfamily: Buccinoidea
- Family: Retimohniidae
- Genus: Retifusus; Dall, 1916

Type species
- Tritonium jessoense Schrenck, 1863

Synonyms
- Plicifusus (Retifusus) Dall, 1916

Genus of gastropods

Retifusus is a genus of sea snails, marine gastropod mollusks in the family Retimohniidae, the true whelks and the like.

== Species ==
Species within the genus Retifusus include:

- Retifusus attenuatus (Golikov & Gulbin, 1977)
- Retifusus buccinoides (Dall, 1913)
- Retifusus chungtui Thach, 2025
- Retifusus daphnelloides (Okutani, 1964)
- Retifusus iturupus (Golikov & Sirenko, 1998)
- Retifusus jessoensis (Schrenck, 1863)
- Retifusus latericeus (Möller, 1842)
- Retifusus laticingulatus Golikov & Gulbin, 1977
- Retifusus latiplicatus Kosyan & Kantor, 2014
- Retifusus olivaceus (Bartsch, 1929)
- Retifusus parvus (Tiba, 1980)
- Retifusus roseus (Dall, 1877)
- Retifusus similis (Golikov & Gulbin, 1977)
- Retifusus toyamanus (Tiba, 1981)
- Retifusus virens (Dall, 1877)

Species brought into synonymy

- Retifusus brunneus (Dall, 1877): synonym of Retifusus jessoensis (Schrenck, 1863)
- Retifusus incisus (Dall, 1919): synonym of Plicifusus olivaceus (Aurivillius, 1885)
- Retifusus olivaceus (Aurivillius, 1885): synonym of Plicifusus olivaceus (Aurivillius, 1885)
- Retifusus rhyssoides (Dall, 1918): synonym of Plicifusus rhyssus (Dall, 1907) (junior subjective synonym)
- Retifusus semiplicatus Golikov, 1985: synonym of Retifusus parvus (Tiba, 1980)
- Retifusus tenuis (Okutani, 1966): synonym of Pararetifusus tenuis (Okutani, 1966) (superseded combination)
- Retifusus yanamii (Yokoyama, 1926): synonym of Retifusus virens (Dall, 1877)
- Retifusus yessoensis (Schrenck, 1863): synonym of Retifusus jessoensis (Schrenck, 1863) (misspelling)
