= Retifusus buccinoides =

Scientific classification
- Kingdom: Animalia
- Phylum: Mollusca
- Class: Gastropoda
- Subclass: Caenogastropoda
- Order: Neogastropoda
- Family: Retimohniidae
- Genus: Retifusus
- Species: R. buccinoides

Binomial name
- Retifusus buccinoides Dall, 1913

Species of gastropod

Retifusus buccinoides is a species of sea snail, a marine gastropod mollusc in the family Retimohniidae, the true whelks and the like.
