= Retifusus iturupus =

Scientific classification
- Kingdom: Animalia
- Phylum: Mollusca
- Class: Gastropoda
- Subclass: Caenogastropoda
- Order: Neogastropoda
- Family: Retimohniidae
- Genus: Retifusus
- Species: R. iturupus

Binomial name
- Retifusus iturupus (Golikov & Sirenko, 1998)

Synonyms
- Mohnia iturupa Golikov & Sirenko, 1998 (original combination)

Species of gastropod

Retifusus iturupus is a species of sea snail, a marine gastropod mollusk in the family Retimohniidae, the true whelks and the like.
