= Retimohnia bella =

Scientific classification
- Kingdom: Animalia
- Phylum: Mollusca
- Class: Gastropoda
- Subclass: Caenogastropoda
- Order: Neogastropoda
- Family: Retimohniidae
- Genus: Retimohnia
- Species: R. bella

Binomial name
- Retimohnia bella Ozaki, 1958

Species of gastropod

Retimohnia bella is a species of sea snail, a marine gastropod mollusc in the family Retimohniidae, the true whelks and the like.
