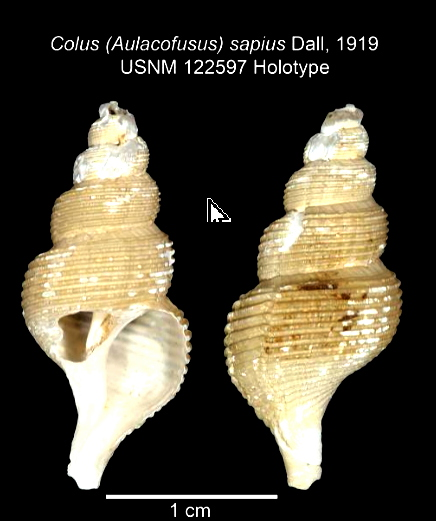
- Shell of Fusipagoda sapia (holotype at the Smithsonian Institution)

Scientific classification
- Kingdom: Animalia
- Phylum: Mollusca
- Class: Gastropoda
- Subclass: Caenogastropoda
- Order: Neogastropoda
- Superfamily: Buccinoidea
- Family: Retimohniidae
- Genus: Fusipagoda
- Species: F. sapia

Binomial name
- Fusipagoda sapia (Dall, 1919)

Synonyms
- Aulacofusus sapius (Dall, 1919); Colus sapius Dall, 191; Colus (Aulacofusus) sapius Dall, 1919 (original combination); Pararetifusus sapius (Dall, 1919)

= Fusipagoda sapia =

Species of gastropod

Fusipagoda sapia is a species of sea snail, a marine gastropod mollusc in the family Retimohniidae, the true whelks and the like.

== Description ==
(Original description as Colus (Aulacofusus) sapius) The small, thin shell measures 22 mm. The apical whorls are eroded, but six prominently rounded whorls remain. The suture is distinct and is not appressed. The whorl in front of it is flattened and without spiral sculpture for a short distance. The shell is white with a straw-colored periostracum. The axial sculpture consists of faint incremental striae. The spiral sculpture consists of (on the penultimate whorl about eight) strong squarish ribs with subequal rather deep, channeled interspaces. Both are slightly wrinkled by the incremental lines and become obsolete on the siphonal canal. There are a few minor spirals behind the posterior rib. The aperture is roundly ovate. The thin outer lip is simple. The inner lip is erased. The white columella is twisted; its axis pervious. The narrow siphonal canal is rather long, well defined and somewhat recurved.

== Distribution ==
This marine species occurs southwest of Sitka, Alaska.
