= Retimohnia frielei =

Scientific classification
- Kingdom: Animalia
- Phylum: Mollusca
- Class: Gastropoda
- Subclass: Caenogastropoda
- Order: Neogastropoda
- Family: Retimohniidae
- Genus: Retimohnia
- Species: R. frielei

Binomial name
- Retimohnia frielei Dall, 1891

Species of gastropod

Retimohnia frielei is a species of sea snail, a marine gastropod mollusc in the family Retimohniidae, the true whelks and the like.
