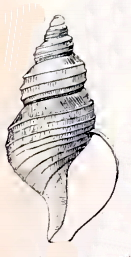
- Original image of a shell of Mohnia parva

Scientific classification
- Kingdom: Animalia
- Phylum: Mollusca
- Class: Gastropoda
- Subclass: Caenogastropoda
- Order: Neogastropoda
- Family: Buccinidae
- Genus: Mohnia
- Species: M. parva

Binomial name
- Mohnia parva (Verrill & Smith, 1882)

Synonyms
- Sipho parvus Verrill & S. Smith, 1882

= Mohnia parva =

Species of gastropod

Mohnia parva is a species of sea snail, a marine gastropod mollusk in the family Buccinidae, which are the true whelks.

== Description ==
The length of the shell varies between 14 mm and 27 mm.

The small, thin, delicate shell is translucent, subfusiform. It contains a rather slender, acute spire; a short, straight siphonal canal; and a few raised, strong, revolving cinguli. The suture is impressed. It has six to seven convex whorls, usually with three (rarely five or six) prominent, rounded cinguli, or carinae, separated by much wider, broadly concave interspaces. The uppermost one is usually some distance below the suture, and is often stronger than the rest, producing a slight shoulder.

On the body whorl, in specimens with six whorls, there are about seven to nine principal carinae, occasionally with a smaller one interpolated, and becoming more crowded anteriorly. On one specimen with seven whorls, there are thirteen principal cinguli. Fine, delicate and close, raised lines of growth, or lamellae, cover the interspaces and cross the raised cinguli.

The protoconch is very small, smooth and glossy. The first whorl is minute and regularly spiral, not upturned. Three spiral cinguli appear on the second whorl. The aperture is elliptical. The thin outer lip is rounded, incurved at the base of the siphonal canal, which is narrow, but very short, and straight. The columella is nearly straight in the middle. The epidermis is thin, lamellose, but not ciliated. The color is yellowish or grayish white. The operculum is ovate, with the outer or left end rounded and incurved, forming a small lobe, defined by a notch, and with the nucleus central to this small lobe.

The odontophore is very slender. The outlines of the median plates are indistinct. They bear three very small but distinct and nearly equal denticles. The lateral teeth of the radula have only two denticles.

== Distribution ==
This marine species lives off New England in the United States
