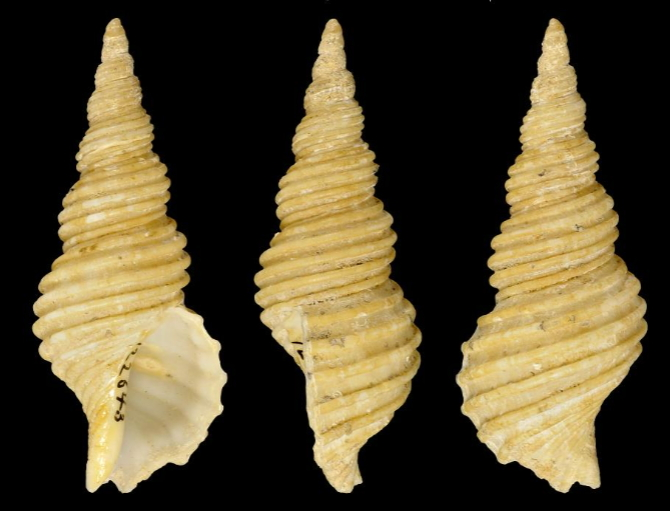
- Shell of Aulacofusus periscelidus (holotype at the Smithsonian Institution)

Scientific classification
- Kingdom: Animalia
- Phylum: Mollusca
- Class: Gastropoda
- Subclass: Caenogastropoda
- Order: Neogastropoda
- Family: Buccinidae
- Genus: Aulacofusus
- Species: A. periscelidus

Binomial name
- Aulacofusus periscelidus (Dall, 1891)

Synonyms
- Aulacofusus brevicauda fortilirata (G. B. Sowerby III, 1913) (junior synonym); Chrysodomus periscelidus Dall, 1891 (original combination); Colus periscelidus (Dall, 1891) superseded combination; Cominella fortilirata G. B. Sowerby III, 1913

= Aulacofusus periscelidus =

Species of gastropod

Aulacofusus periscelidus is a species of sea snail, a marine gastropod mollusc in the family Buccinidae, the true whelks.

== Description ==
The length of the shell shell attains 46 mm, its diameter 19 mm.

(Original description) The shell is small and robust, resembling a diminutive Aulacofusus spitzbergensis (synonym of Aulacofusus brevicauda (Deshayes, 1832)). It is fundamentally white, covered by a thin, yellowish periostracum. The spire is distinctly acute, leading to a total of eight rounded whorls.

The sculpture is dominated by prominent, elevated spiral cords separated by deep, well-defined channels. There are five strong spirals on the upper whorls, increasing to ten on the body whorl.

The aperture is white within the throat and is internally grooved, with the indentations corresponding exactly to the external spiral cords. The siphonal canal is notably short.

== Distribution ==
This marine species occurs near Akutan Island, Alaska.
