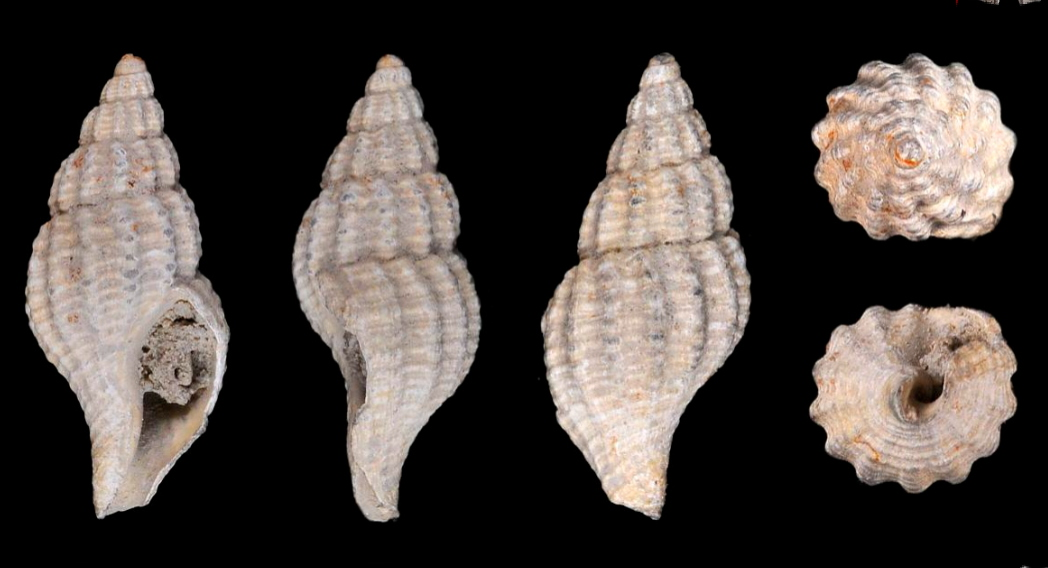
- Shell of Mohnia carolinensis (syntype at the Smithsonian Institution)

Scientific classification
- Kingdom: Animalia
- Phylum: Mollusca
- Class: Gastropoda
- Subclass: Caenogastropoda
- Order: Neogastropoda
- Family: Buccinidae
- Genus: Mohnia
- Species: M. carolinensis

Binomial name
- Mohnia carolinensis (A. E. Verrill, 1884)

Synonyms
- Retimohnia carolinensis (Verrill, 1884); Urosalpinx carolinensis Verrill, 1884

= Mohnia carolinensis =

Species of gastropod

Mohnia carolinensis is a species of sea snail, a marine gastropod mollusk in the family Buccinidae, the true whelks.

== Description ==
The length of the shell attains 15 mm, its diameter 7 mm.

(Original combination) The small shell is pretty regularly fusiform. It has an elevated, rather acute spire, which forms nearly one-half the total length of the shell. It contains six to seven moderately convex whorls, with an impressed suture. The sculpture consists of about twelve rather prominent, stout longitudinal ribs, which run nearly straight across the whorls. And on the body whorl these extend to the base of the siphon. These are separated by deeply concave intervals of about the same width. The whole surface is covered by strongly marked revolving cinguli, which cross both the ribs and their interspaces, and thicken so as to form small, rounded nodules where they cross the ribs. These are separated by interspaces of about the same width, in the middle of which there is a much smaller, thin revolving cingulus, alternating pretty regularly with the larger ones around the periphery. On the anterior part of the body-whorl, and sometimes at the periphery, there are two or three small revolving cinguli in some of the interspaces. On the penultimate whorl there are usually five to seven of the primary cinguli, and on the body whorl and siphon there are about eighteen to twenty. The whole surface is also covered, in perfect specimens, with fine, slightly elevated, wavy lines of growth, which are most conspicuous on the intervals between the ribs. They are usually worn off from the more prominent parts of the ribs and nodules. The protoconch consists of about 2½ regularly coiled whorls. The first two are small, smooth, translucent and somewhat lustrous. The last is covered with rather faint revolving lines, crossed by the lines of growth, which gradually merge into the longitudinal sculpture of the normal whorls, there being no very distinct demarcation between the protoconch and the next whorl. The apical whorl is minute, regularly increasing. The aperture is elongated, ovate-fusiform; The outer lip is thin, sharp and regularly curved. The inner margin is regularly arched. The columella is somewhat elongated, its margin sinuous and somewhat excurved at the tip. The siphonal canal is narrow and somewhat elongated, a little curved. The color of the shell is bluish white. The epidermis is very thin, pale grayish or yellowish white.

== Distribution ==
This species occurs in the Gulf of Mexico.
