= Retimohniidae =

Scientific classification
- Kingdom: Animalia
- Phylum: Mollusca
- Class: Gastropoda
- Subclass: Caenogastropoda
- Order: Neogastropoda
- Superfamily: Buccinoidea
- Family: Retimohniidae; Kantor, Fedosov, Kosyan, Puillandre, Sorokin, Kano, R. Clark & Bouchet, 2021

Family of gastropods

The Retimohniidae are taxonomic family in the superfamily Buccinoidea of large sea snails, often known as whelks and the like.

== Genera ==
- Fusipagoda Habe & Ki. Ito, 1965
- Retifusus Dall, 1916
- Retimohnia J. H. McLean, 1995
