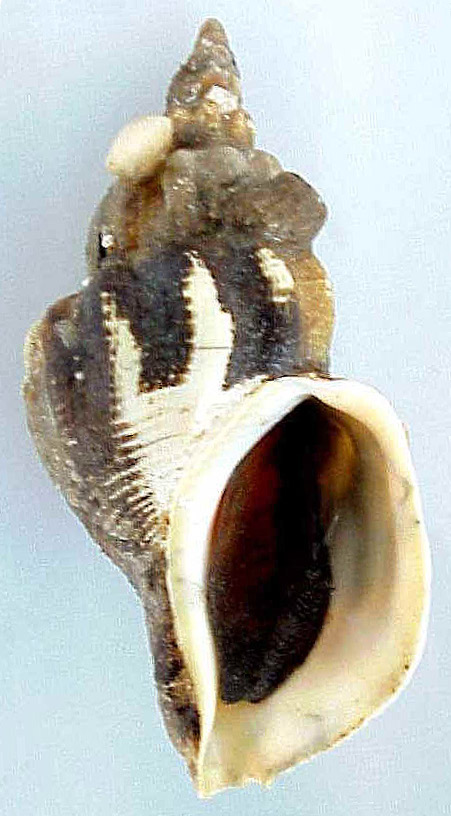
- Apertural view of the shell of Beringius kennicottii

Scientific classification
- Kingdom: Animalia
- Phylum: Mollusca
- Class: Gastropoda
- Subclass: Caenogastropoda
- Order: Neogastropoda
- Family: Buccinidae
- Genus: Beringius
- Species: B. kennicottii

Binomial name
- Beringius kennicottii (Dall, 1871)

= Beringius kennicottii =

Species of gastropod

Beringius kennicottii is a species of sea snail.

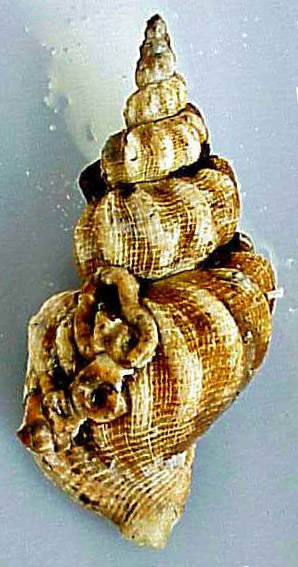
Abapertural view of the shell of Beringius kennicottii.
