= William Bean (geologist) =

English palaeontologist (1787–1866)

William Bean (1787–1866) was an English geologist and conchologist. He was a pioneer of Yorkshire geology. In 1859, he sold his collection of over 15,000 fossils (mostly from localities around Scarborough). The majority of his collection was purchased by the British Museum and the Yorkshire Philosophical Society.

Bean described several new species of Mollusca, including the whelk Beringius turtoni, named in honor of William Turton. Bean was associated with the Magazine of Natural History, and was a friend of Joshua Alder and Albany Hancock.

== Selected publications ==
- Bean, William (1839). "A Catalogue of the Fossils found in the Cornish Limestone of Scarborough". Magazine of Natural History. Vol. 3. pp. 57–62.
