= Beringius crebricostatus =

Scientific classification
- Kingdom: Animalia
- Phylum: Mollusca
- Class: Gastropoda
- Subclass: Caenogastropoda
- Order: Neogastropoda
- Family: Buccinidae
- Genus: Beringius
- Species: B. crebricostatus

Binomial name
- Beringius crebricostatus (Dall, 1877)

Species of gastropod

Beringius crebricostatus is a species of sea snail, a marine gastropod mollusk in the family Buccinidae, the true whelks.
