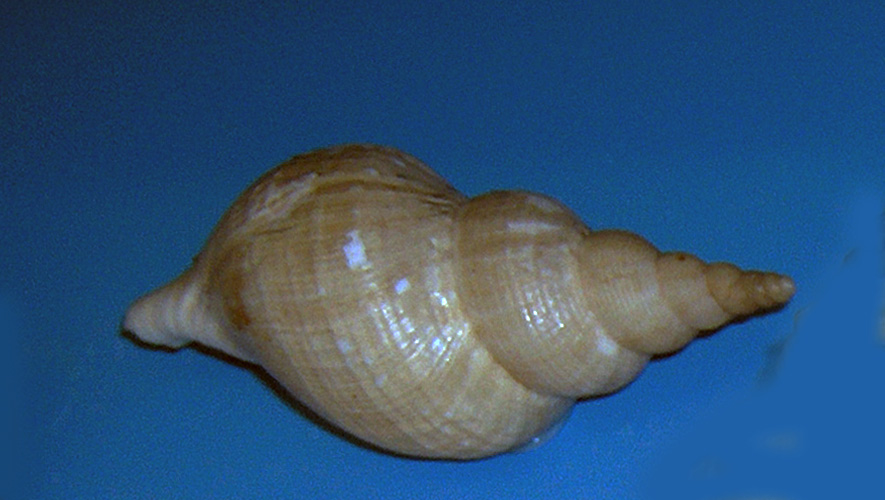

Scientific classification
- Kingdom: Animalia
- Phylum: Mollusca
- Class: Gastropoda
- Subclass: Caenogastropoda
- Order: Neogastropoda
- Family: Buccinidae
- Genus: Beringius
- Species: B. turtoni

Binomial name
- Beringius turtoni (Bean, 1834)

Synonyms
- Beringius ossiani (Friele, 1879); Beringius ossiania (Friele, 1879); Chrysodomus ossiana (Friele, 1879); Neptunea ossiania Friele, 1879

= Beringius turtoni =

Species of gastropod

Beringius turtoni is a species of sea snail, a marine gastropod mollusk in the family Buccinidae, the true whelks.
