= Beringius behringii =

Scientific classification
- Kingdom: Animalia
- Phylum: Mollusca
- Class: Gastropoda
- Subclass: Caenogastropoda
- Order: Neogastropoda
- Family: Buccinidae
- Genus: Beringius
- Species: B. behringii

Binomial name
- Beringius behringii (Middendorff, 1848)

Species of gastropod

Beringius behringii is a species of sea snail, a marine gastropod mollusk in the family Buccinidae, the true whelks.
