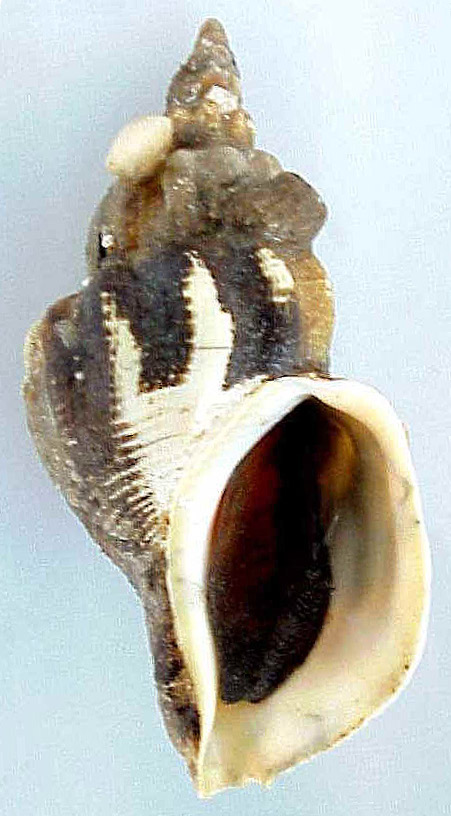
- Apertural view of the shell of Beringius kenicottii

Scientific classification
- Kingdom: Animalia
- Phylum: Mollusca
- Class: Gastropoda
- Subclass: Caenogastropoda
- Order: Neogastropoda
- Family: Buccinidae
- Subfamily: Beringiinae
- Genus: Beringius; Dall, 1887

Synonyms
- Beringion Habe & Ito, 1965; Beringius (Beringion) Habe & Ito, 1965; Beringius (Neoberingius) Habe & Ito, 1965; Chrysodomus (Beringius) Dall, 1887; Jumala Friele, 1882; Ukko Friele, 1893

= Beringius =

Genus of gastropods

Beringius is a genus of large sea snails or true whelks, a marine gastropod molluscs in the family Buccinidae, the true whelks.

Beringius is the type genus of the subfamily Beringiinae.

== Species ==
According to the World Register of Marine Species the following species with valid names are included within the genus Beringius :

- Beringius aleuticus Dall, 1895
- Beringius behringii (Middendorff, 1848)
- Beringius bogasoni Warén & S. M. Smith, 2006
- Beringius crebricostatus (Dall, 1877)
- Beringius eyerdami A. G. Smith, 1959
- Beringius indentatus Dall, 1919
- Beringius kennicottii (Dall, 1871)
- Beringius marshalli Dall, 1919
- Beringius polynematicus Pilsbry, 1907
- Beringius stimpsoni (Gould, 1860)
- Beringius turtoni (Bean, 1834)
- Beringius undatus Dall, 1919
