= Beringius bogasoni =

Scientific classification
- Kingdom: Animalia
- Phylum: Mollusca
- Class: Gastropoda
- Subclass: Caenogastropoda
- Order: Neogastropoda
- Family: Buccinidae
- Genus: Beringius
- Species: B. bogasoni

Binomial name
- Beringius bogasoni Waren & Smith, 2006

Species of gastropod

Beringius bogasoni is a species of sea snail, a marine gastropod mollusk in the family Buccinidae, the true whelks.
