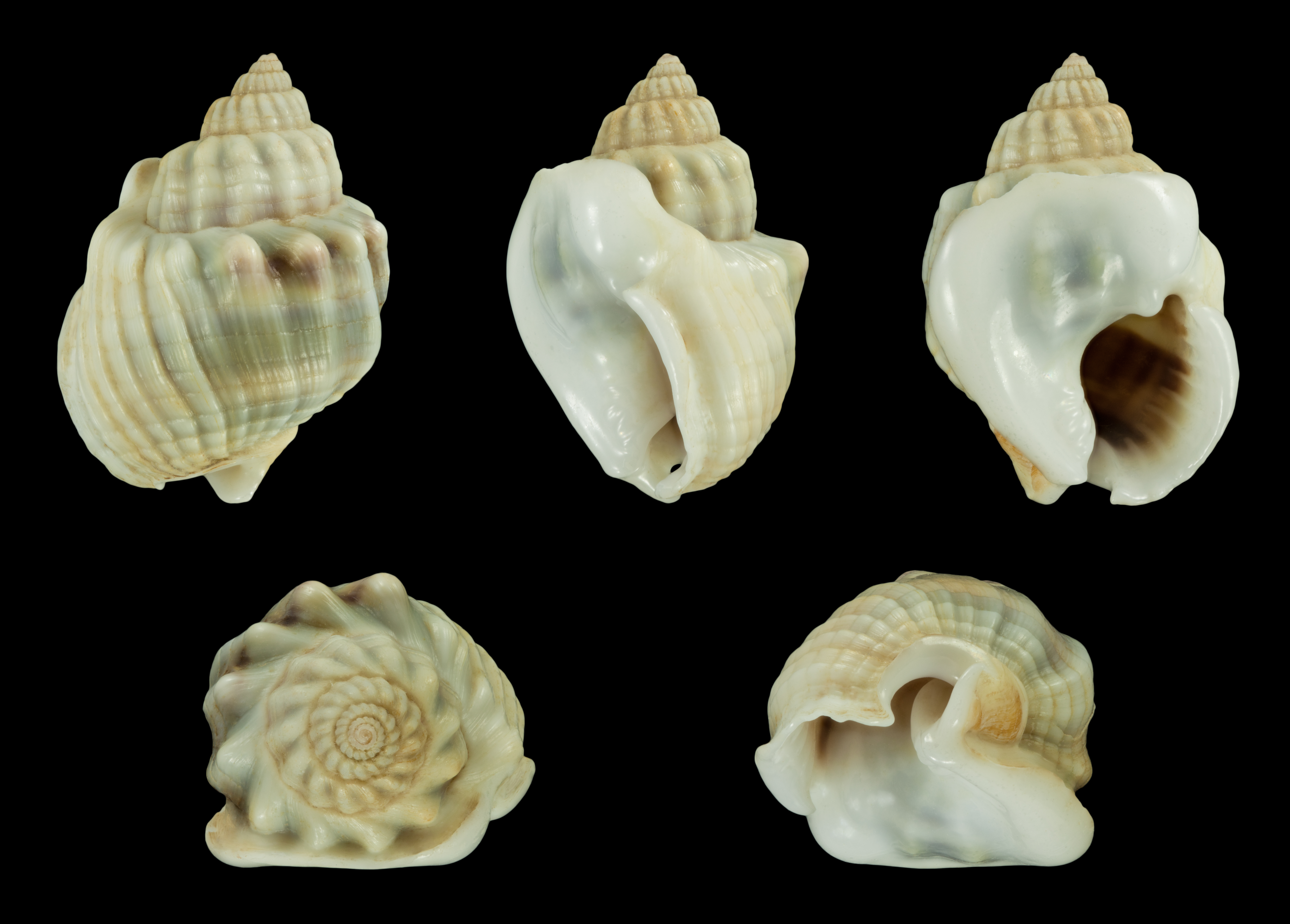
- Shell of Nassarius arcularia

Scientific classification
- Kingdom: Animalia
- Phylum: Mollusca
- Class: Gastropoda
- Subclass: Caenogastropoda
- Order: Neogastropoda
- Family: Nassariidae
- Subfamily: Nassariinae
- Genus: Nassarius; Dumeril, 1806

Type species
- Buccinum arcularia Linnaeus, 1758

Species
- See text

Synonyms
- Aciculina A. Adams, 1853; Alectrion Montfort, 1810 (junior synonym); Alectrion (Zeuxis) H. Adams & A. Adams, 1853; Alectryon Melvill, 1918 (unjustified emendation); Allanassa Iredale, 1929; Arcularia Link, 1807; Arcularia (Plicarcularia) Thiele, 1929; Arculia Jousseaume, 1888 (incorrect subsequent spelling); Austronassaria C. Laeron & J. Laseron, 1956; † Bathynassa Ladd, 1976; † Buccinum (Niotha) H. Adams & A. Adams, 1853; † Chelenassa Shuto, 1969; Eione Risso, 1826 (Invalid: junior homonym of Eione Rafinesque, 1814); Glabrinassa Shuto, 1969; Hebra H. Adams & A. Adams, 1853; Nassa Lamarck, 1799 (Invalid: junior homonym of Nassa Röding, 1798); Nassa (Aciculina) Adams, 1853; Nassa (Alectrion) Montfort, 1810; Nassa (Alectryon) Berthold in Latreille, 1827; Nassa (Arcularia) Link, 1807; Nassa (Eione) Risso, 1826; Nassa (Hebra) H. Adams & A. Adams, 1853; Nassa (Niotha) H. Adams & A. Adams, 1853; Nassa (Profundinassa) Thiele, 1929; Nassa (Venassa) Martens, 1881; Nassa (Zeuxis) H. Adams & A. Adams, 1853; Nassarius (Aciculina) Adams, 1853; Nassarius (Alectrion) Montfort, 1810; Nassarius (Alectryon) Berthold in Latreille, 1827; Nassarius (Arcularia) Link, 1807; Nassarius (Austronassaria) C. Laseron & J. Laseron, 1956; Nassarius (Bathynassa) Ladd, 1976; Nassarius (Catillon) Addicott, 1965; † Nassarius (Chelenassa) Shuto, 1969; Nassarius (Eione) Risso, 1826; Nassarius (Glabrinassa) Shuto, 1969; Nassarius (Hima) Gray, 1852 ex Leach, ms.; † Nassarius (Nanarius) Woodring, 1964 accepted, alternate representation; Nassarius (Nassarius) Duméril, 1805· accepted, alternate representation; Nassarius (Niotha) H. Adams & A. Adams, 1853; Nassarius (Pallacera) Woodring, 1964 accepted, alternate representation; Nassarius (Plicarcularia) Thiele, 1929; Nassarius (Profundinassa) Thiele, 1929; Nassarius (Proneritula) Thiele, 1929; † Nassarius (Psilarius) Woodring, 1964 accepted, alternate representation; Nassarius (Pygmaeonassa) Annadale, 1924; Nassarius (Retiarcularia) Shuto, 1969 (incorrect subsequent spelling); Nassarius (Tarazeuxis) Iredale, 1936; Nassarius (Varicinassa) Habe, 1946; Nassarius (Venassa) Martens, 1881; Nassarius (Zeuxis) H. Adams & A. Adams, 1853; Niotha H. Adams & A. Adams, 1853; Pallacera Woodring, 1964; Plicarcularia Thiele, 1929; Profundinassa Thiele, 1929; Pygmaeonassa Annandale, 1924; Reticularcularia Shuto, 1969 (nomen nudum); Scabronassa Peile, 1939; Tavaniotha Iredale, 1936; Tritia (Varicinassa) Habe, 1946; Varicinassa Habe, 1946; Venassa Martens, 1881; Zeuxis H. Adams & A. Adams, 1853

= Nassarius =

Genus of gastropods

Nassarius, common name nassa mud snails (USA) or dog whelks (UK), is a genus of minute to medium-sized sea snails, marine gastropod molluscs in the family Nassariidae. They are scavengers.

== Etymology ==
The name is derived from the Latin word "nassa", meaning a wickerbasket with a narrow neck, for catching fish. Nassarius would then mean "someone who uses such a wickerbasket for catching fish".

== Ecology ==
=== Distribution and habitat ===
Species within this genus are found worldwide. These snails usually live on mud flats or sand flats, intertidally or subtidally.

=== Life habits ===
Most Nassarius species are very active scavengers, feeding on crabs and carrion as dead fish, etc. They often burrow into marine substrates and then wait with only their siphon protruding, until they smell nearby food.

== Shell description ==
The shells of species in this genus have a relatively high cyrtoconoid (approaching a conical shape but with convex sides) spire and a siphonal notch.

(Described as Aciculina) The shell is turreted, polished, smooth or longitudinally plicate. The inner lip shows the callus sharp, straight, defined. The outer lip is produced in the middle, variced externally.

(Described as Nassa) The eyes are situated on the middle of the tentacles. The lingual teeth are arched and pectinated. The uncini show a basal tooth. The foot is large, expanded and bifurcate at its posterior extremity.

The operculum is ovate, the margin serrated or entire.

The shell is ovate and ventricose. The body whorl is variously sculptured. The aperture is ovate, with a short reflected truncated anterior canal. The inner lip is smooth, often widely spread over with enamel, with a posterior callosity or blunt dentiform plait. The outer lip is dentated, internally crenulated.

== Anatomy ==
The animal has a long siphon.

== Human use ==
=== Archeology ===
Several beads made from Nassarius gibbosulus shells are thought to be the earliest known forms of personal adornment, or even jewelry. Two shell beads found in Skhul Cave on the slopes of Mount Carmel, Israel, are thought to be 100,000 years old, whilst another found at Oued Djebbana, Algeria, is believed to be 90,000 years old. A further group of pierced shells, some with red ochre, has been recovered from the Aterian levels at the Taforalt site in Morocco; these Nassarius gibbosulus beads have been securely dated to about 82,000 years ago.

All these examples predate several 75,000-year-old Nassarius kraussianus beads which were found at Blombos Cave, South Africa (including some colored with red ochre). These beads had previously been thought to be the oldest examples of jewelry.

From A.D. 1130 to 1275, shell beads were manufactured by the inhabitants of the Exhausted Cave near the Clear Creek Ruins. A Southern Sinagua site in Verde Valley, Arizona where "shell played a major role in the economic system of this culture."

=== Modern uses ===
Nassarius vibex is a species which is often selected for marine aquaria. It is often confused with Nassarius obsoletus, a cooler water snail less suited to tropical marine aquarium temperatures. In aquaria, the Nassarius is considered nearly indispensable for keeping sand beds clean and healthy, as these snails tend to burrow and plow through the upper layer in a conch-like fashion, keeping algae and detritus from building up visibly on the surface.

The shells of various species of Nassarius are popular with shell collectors, and are sometimes used in jewelry and other forms of decoration.

== Taxonomy ==
The genus Nassarius has traditionally been subdivided into several subgenera, based on differences in shell morphology, especially the sculpture: Aciculina, Alectrion, Allanassa, Nassodonta, Niotha, Plicarcularia, Profundinassa, Pygmaeonassa, Telasco, and Zeuxis. However, this division is difficult to define, resulting in much confusion. Even phylogenetic analysis shows that the division into these subgenera appears to be uncertain and unreliable. There seem to be two groups within the genus Nassarius with the closest relationship between the subgenera Zeuxis and Telasco. Even the species within the subgenus Plicarcularia do not belong to a single clade. In the end, the molecular phylogeny did not match the previous morphological phylogeny.

== Gallery ==
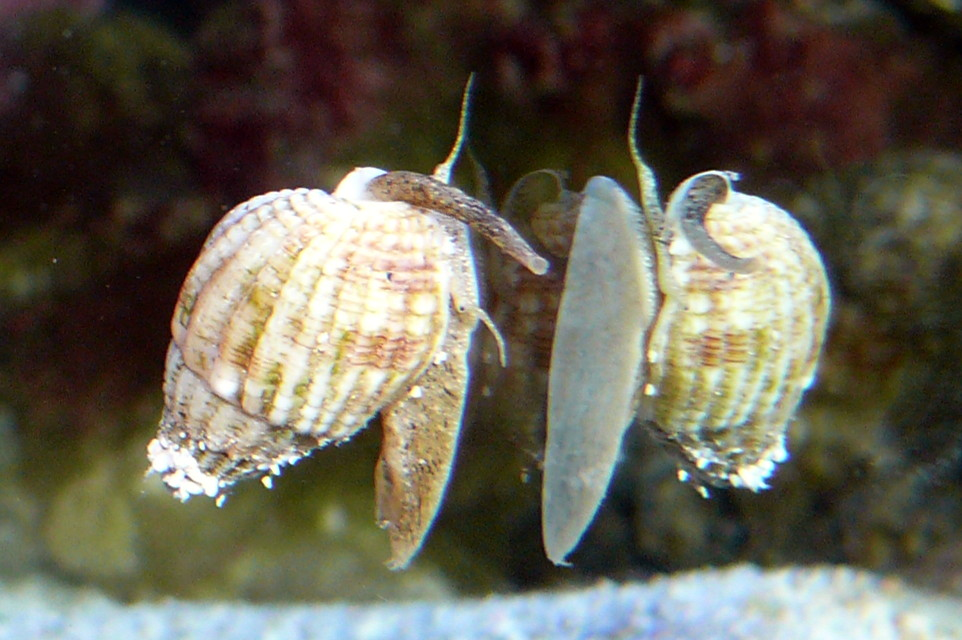

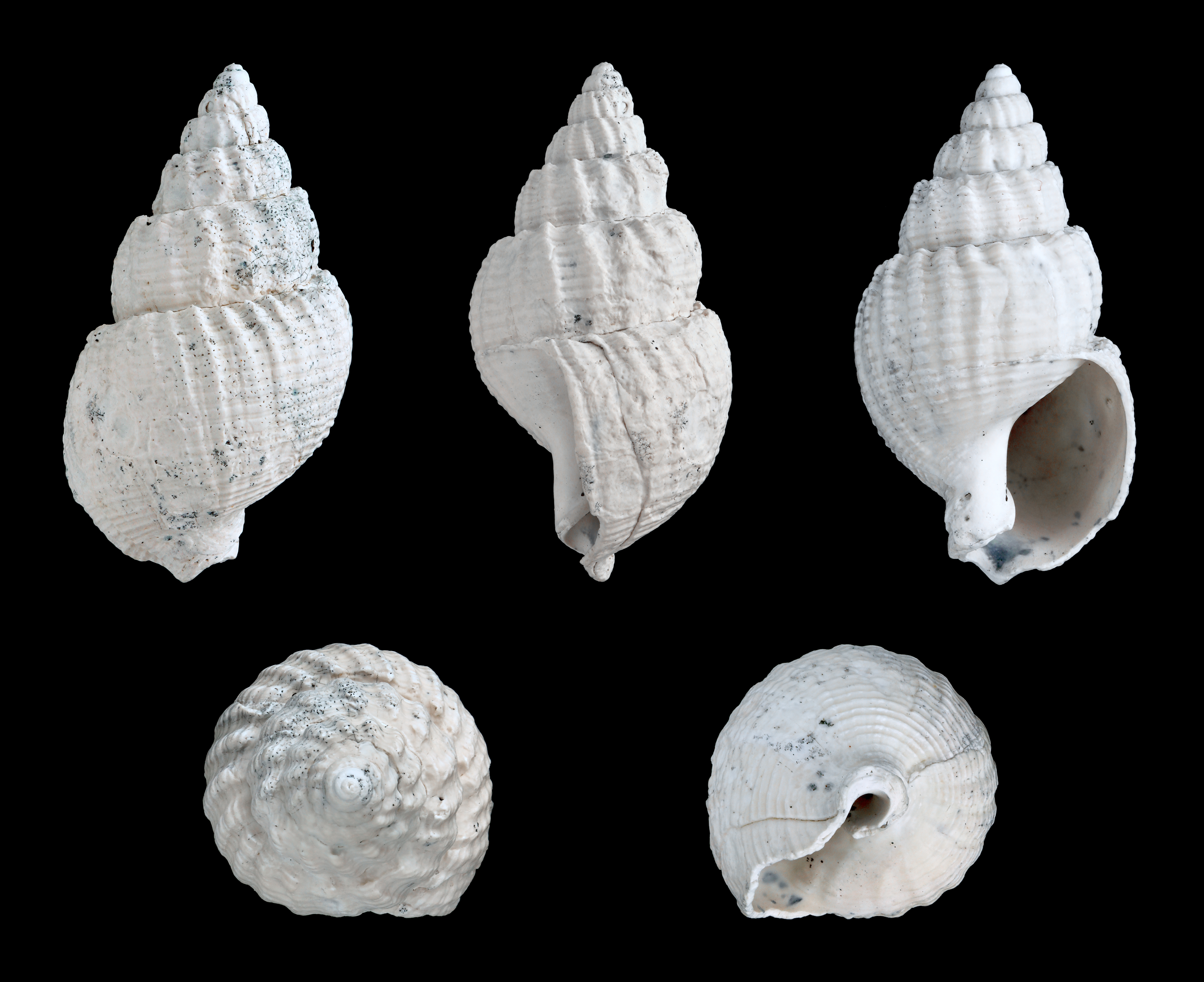
Nassarius scaldisianus

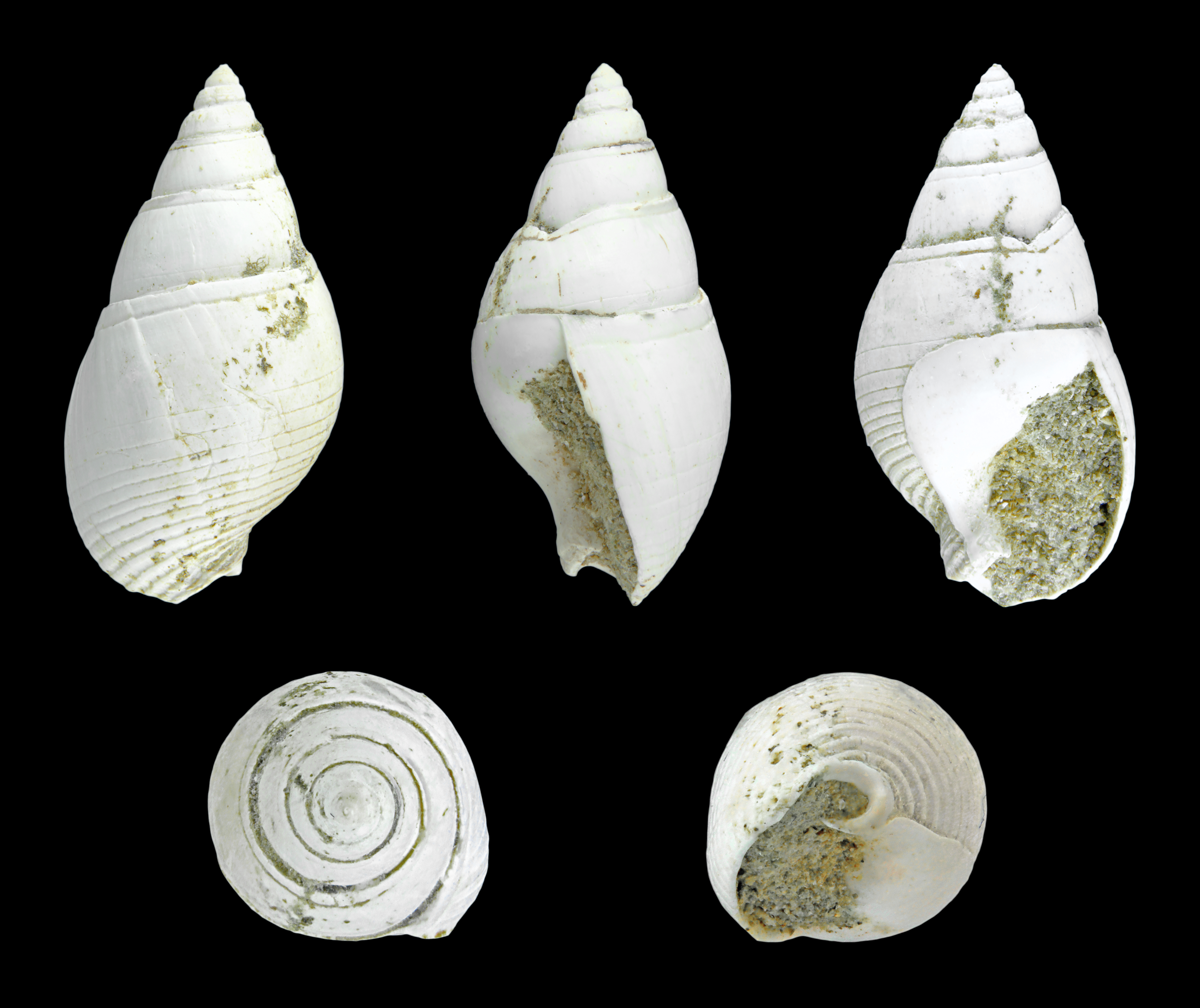
Nassarius semistriatus

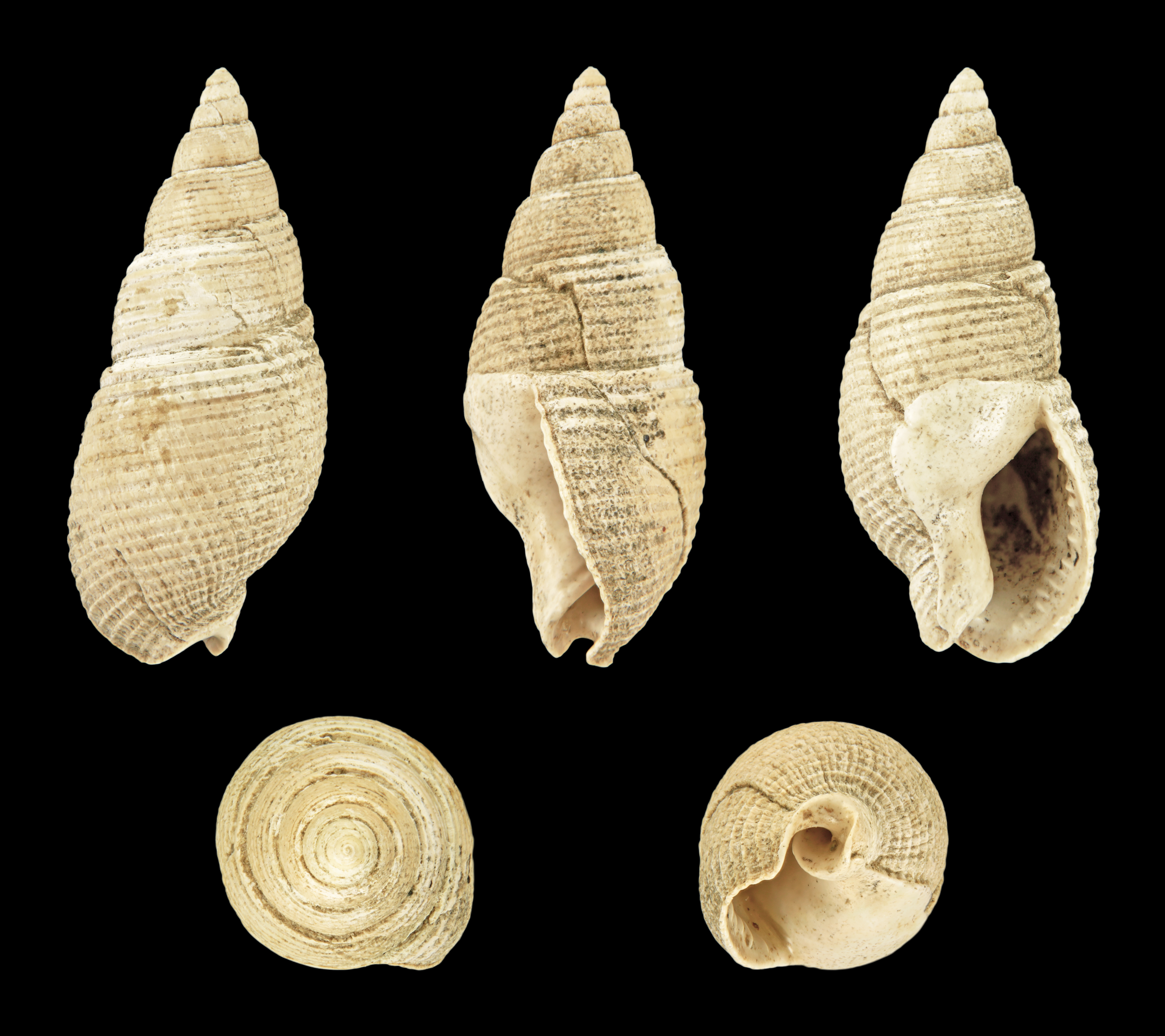
Nassarius semistriatus

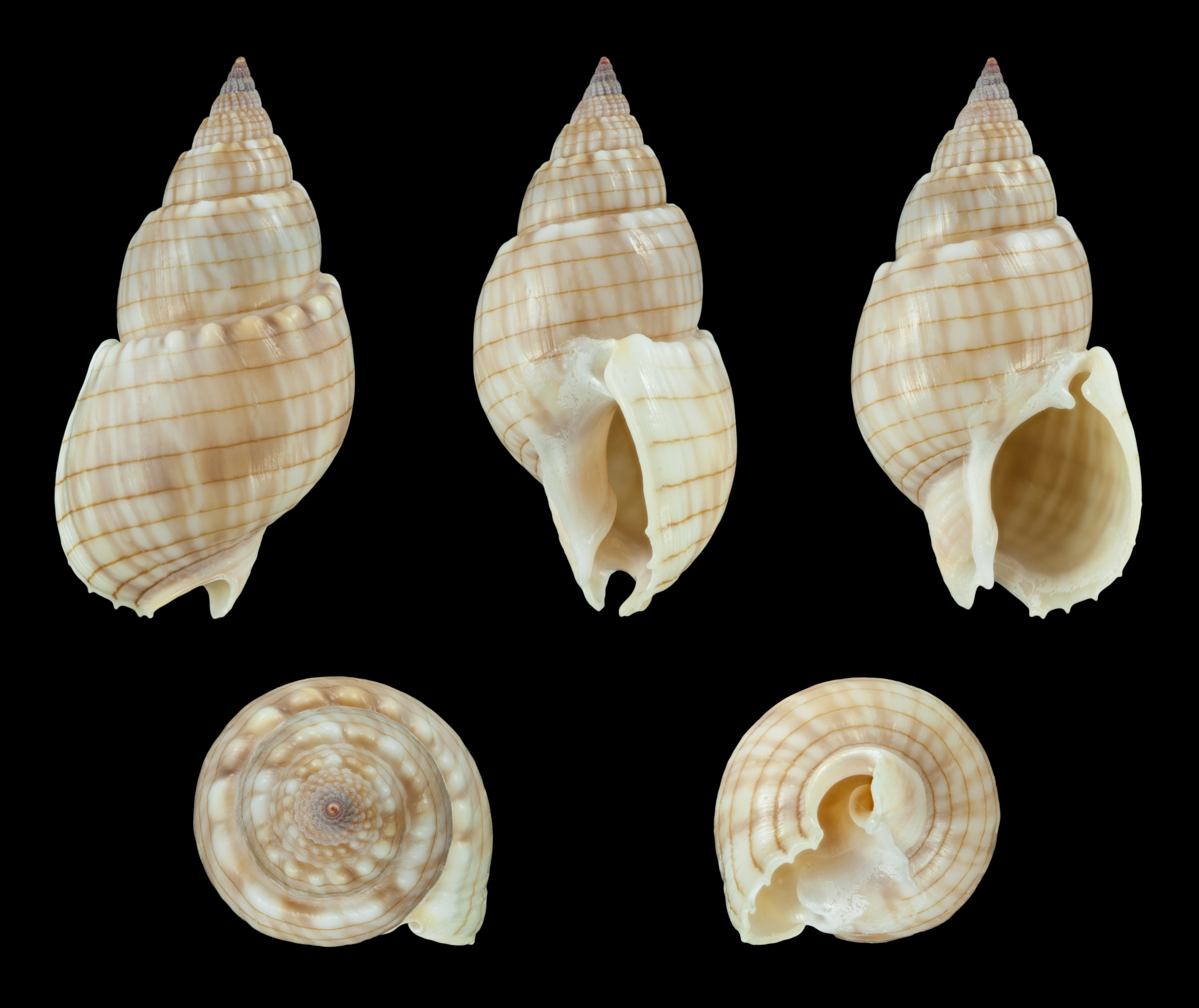
Nassarius (Alectrion) glans glans

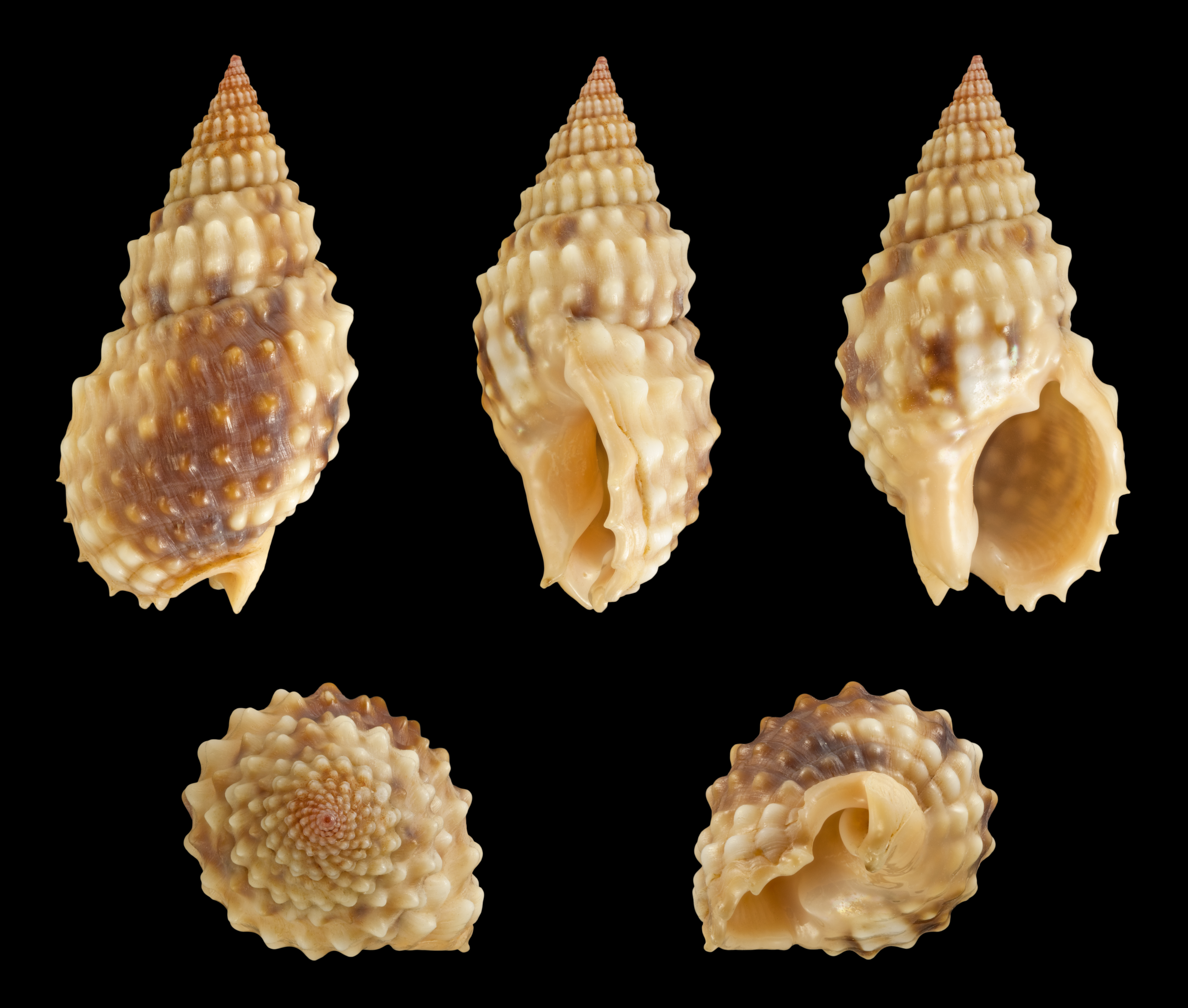
Nassarius (Alectrion) papillosus

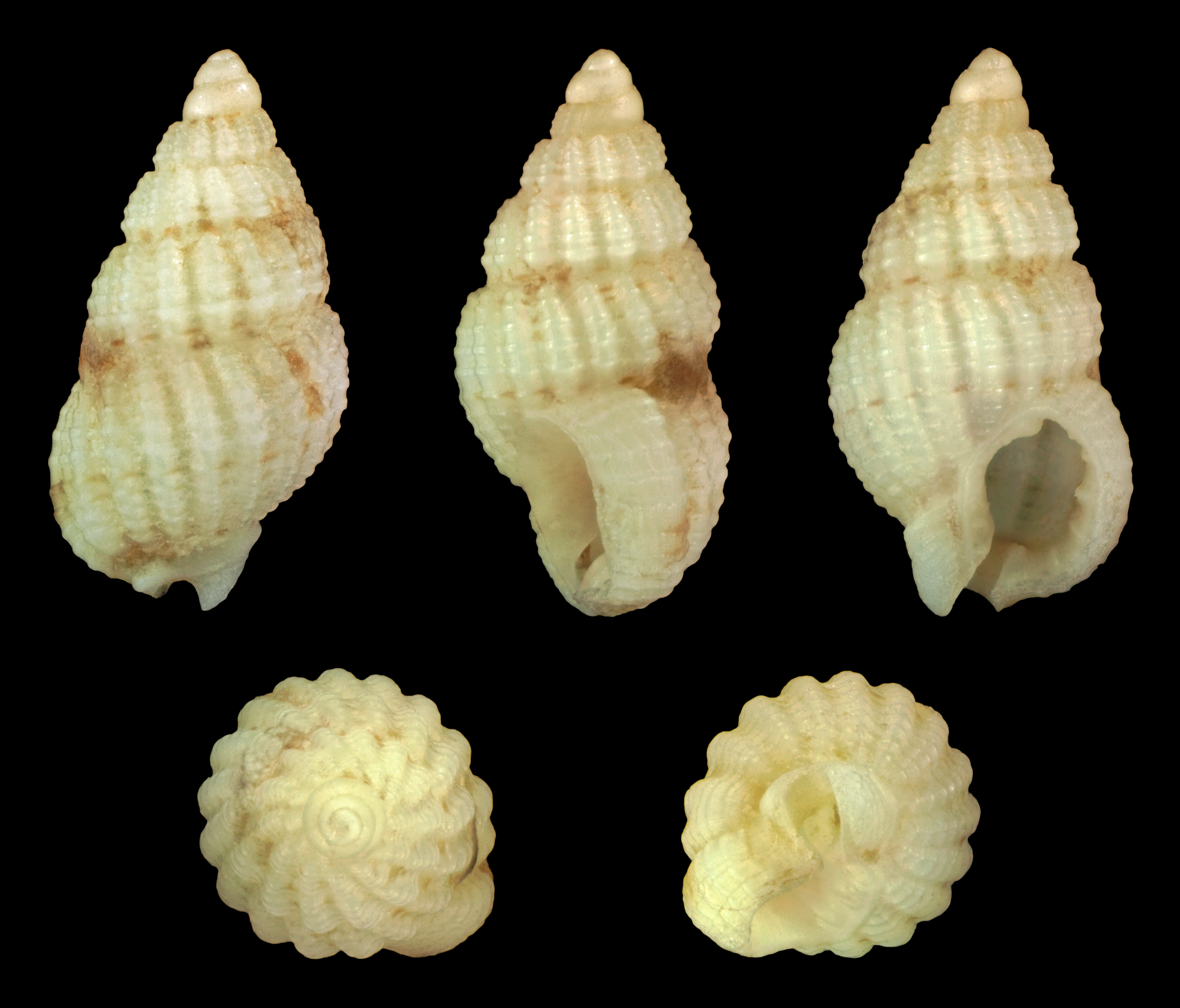
Nassarius (Hima) fuscolineatus

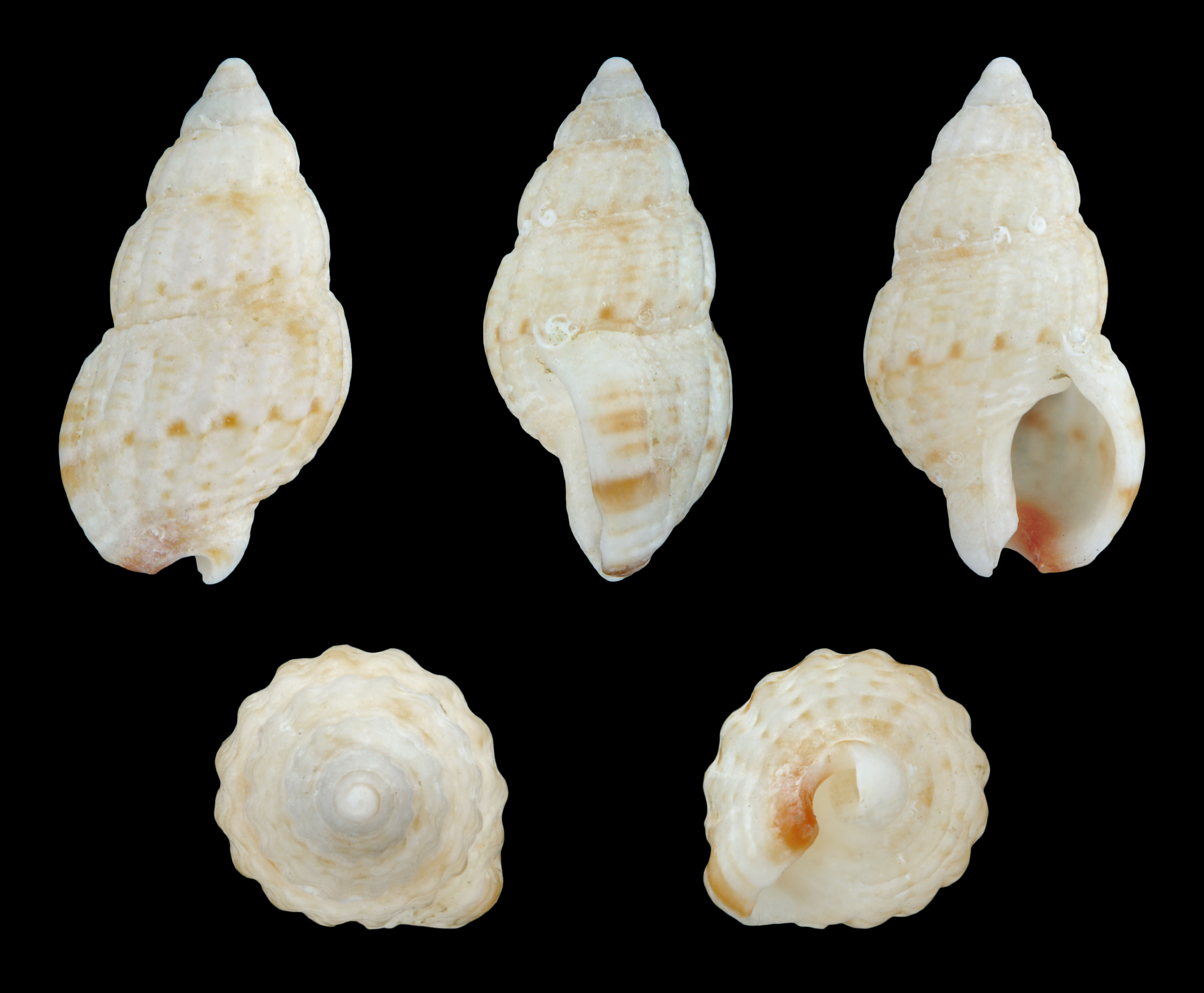
Nassarius (Hima) kochianus

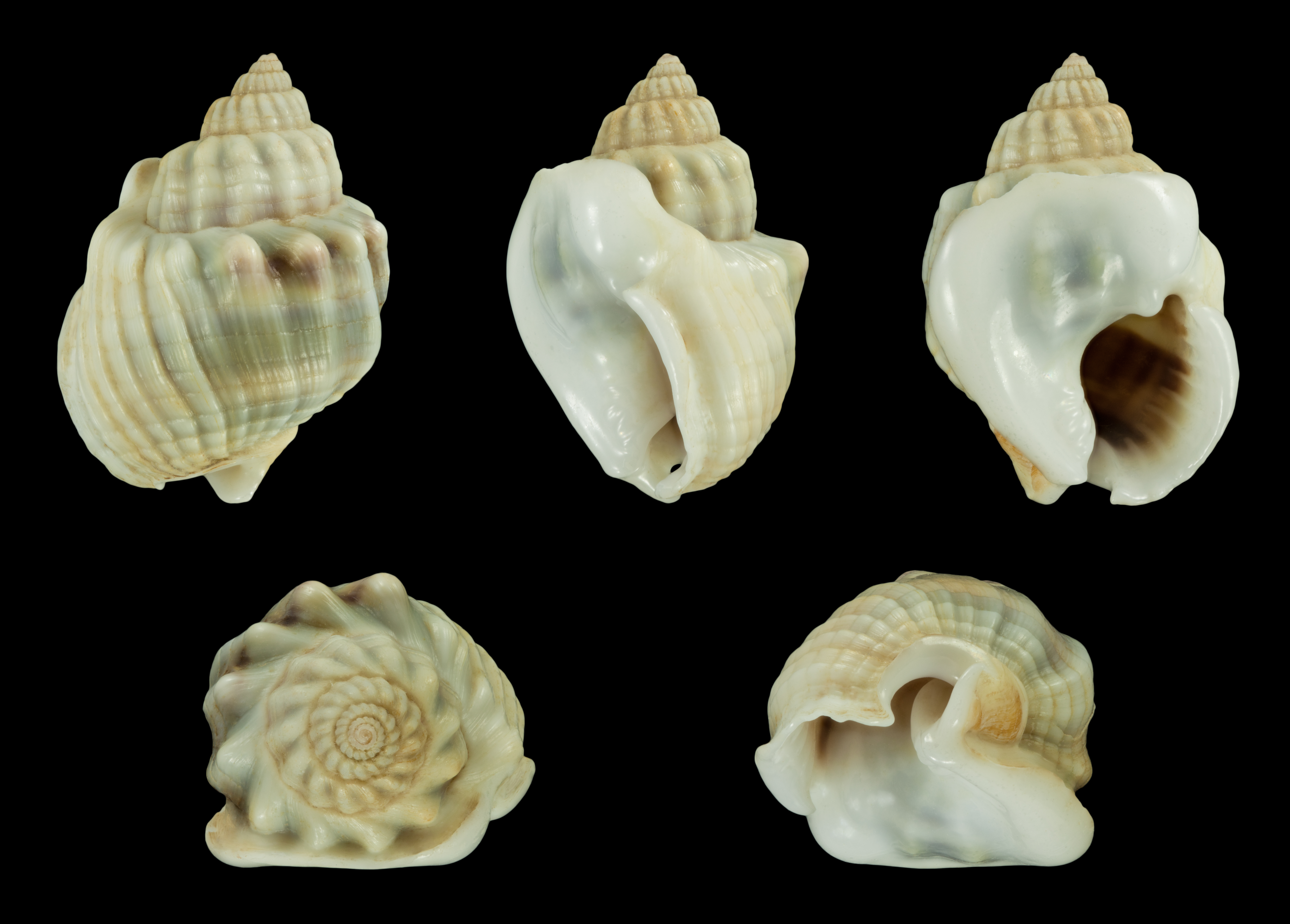
Nassarius (Nassarius) arcularia

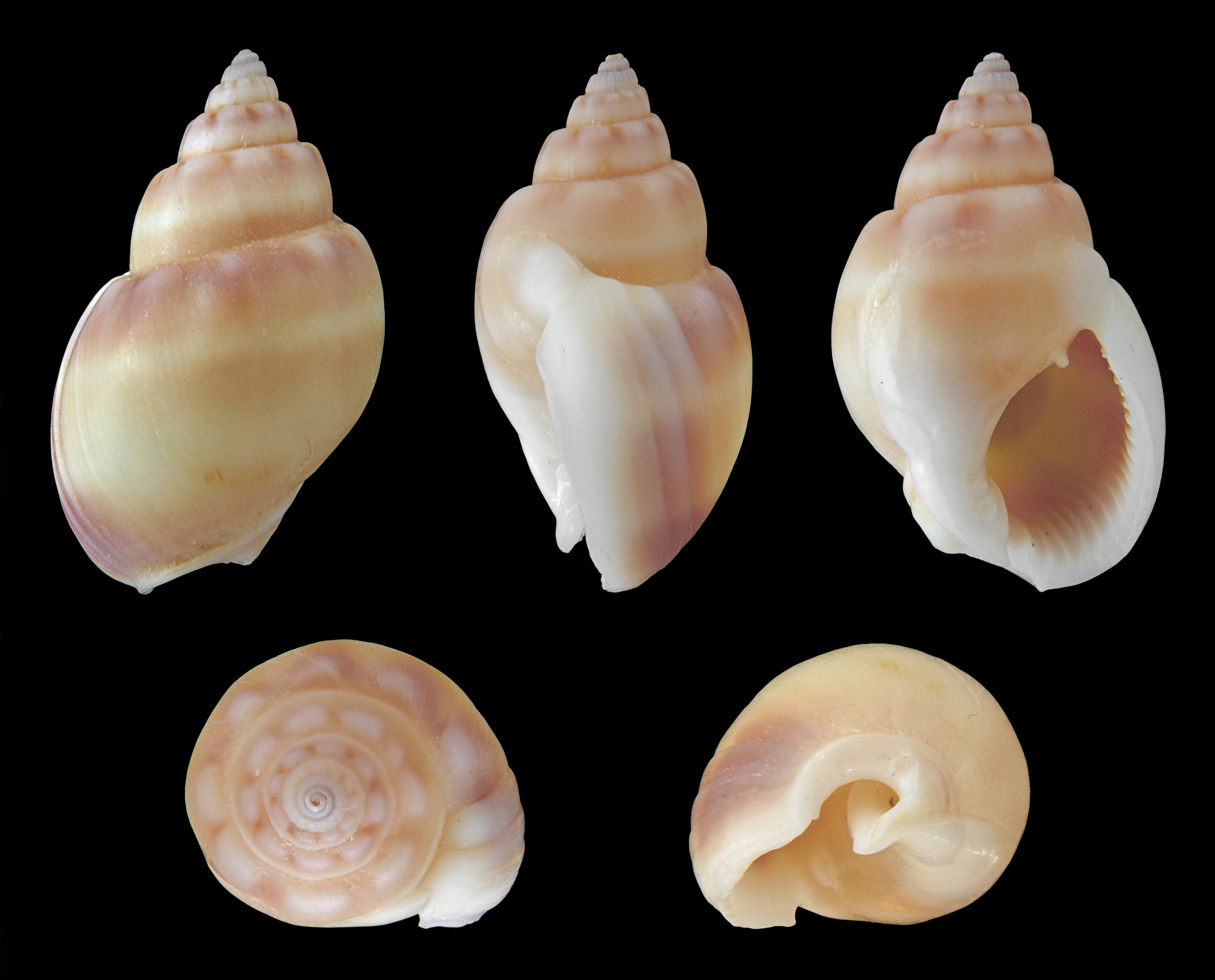
Nassarius (Nassarius) coronatus

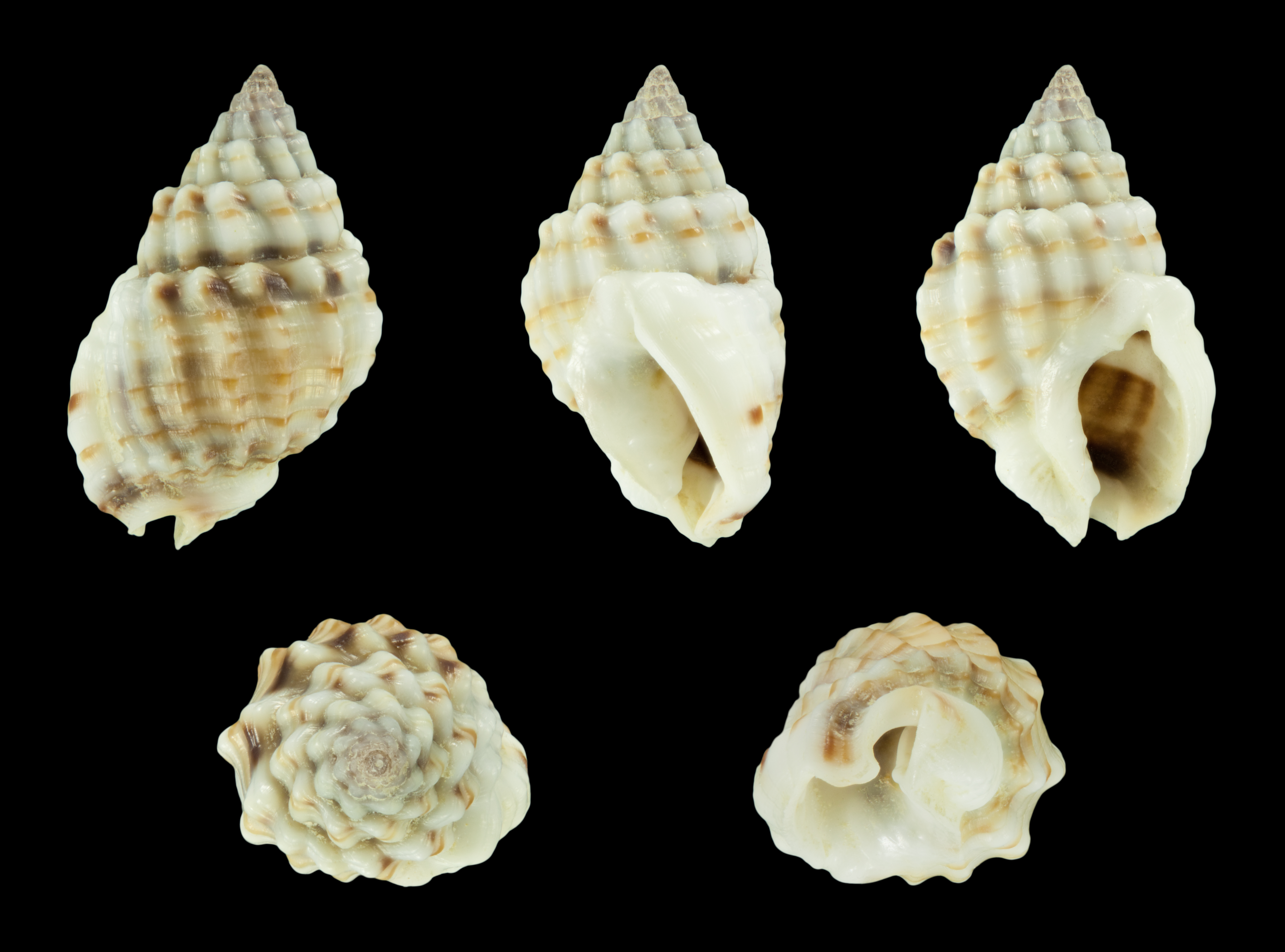
Nassarius (Nassarius) crenoliratus

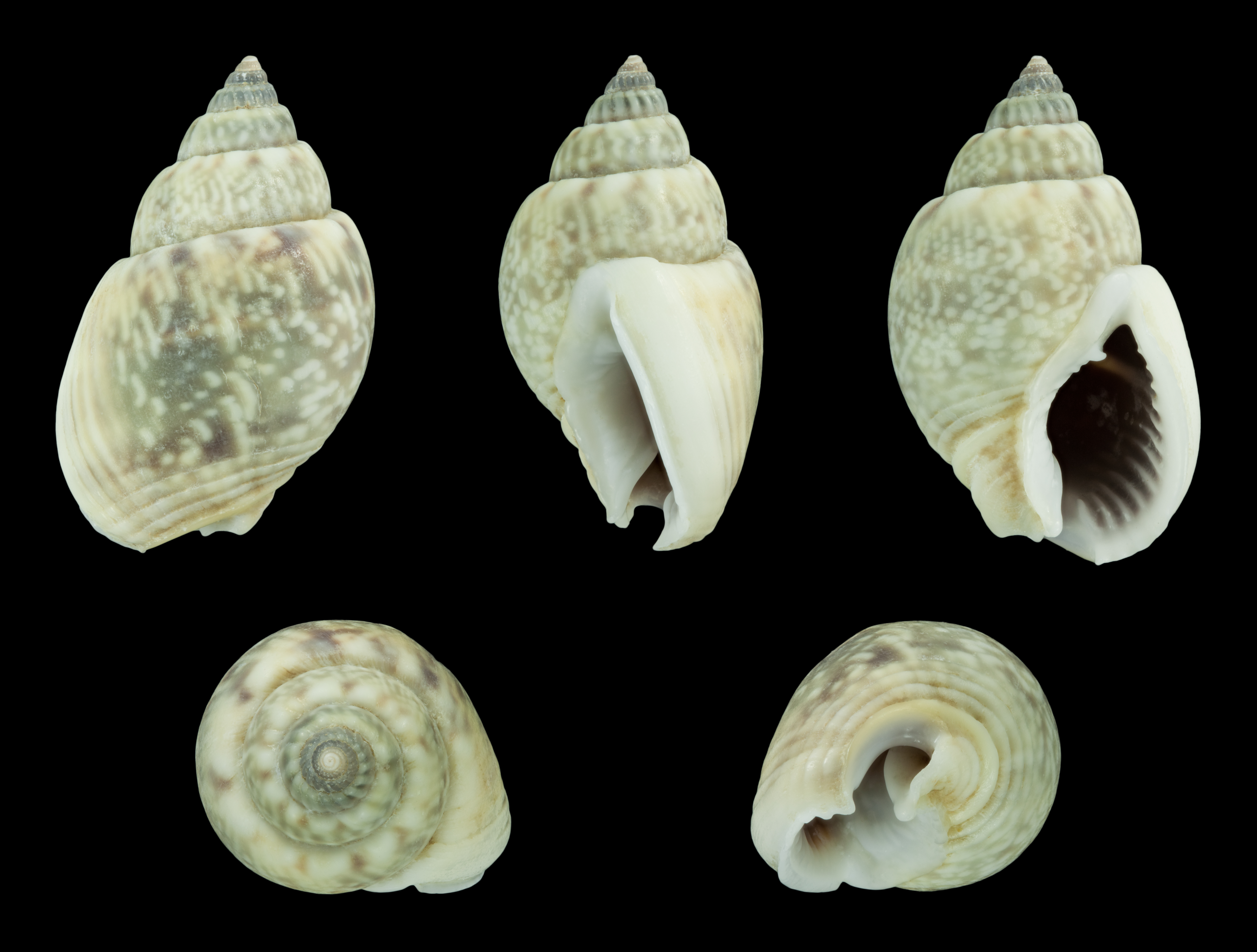
Nassarius (Nassarius) graphiterus

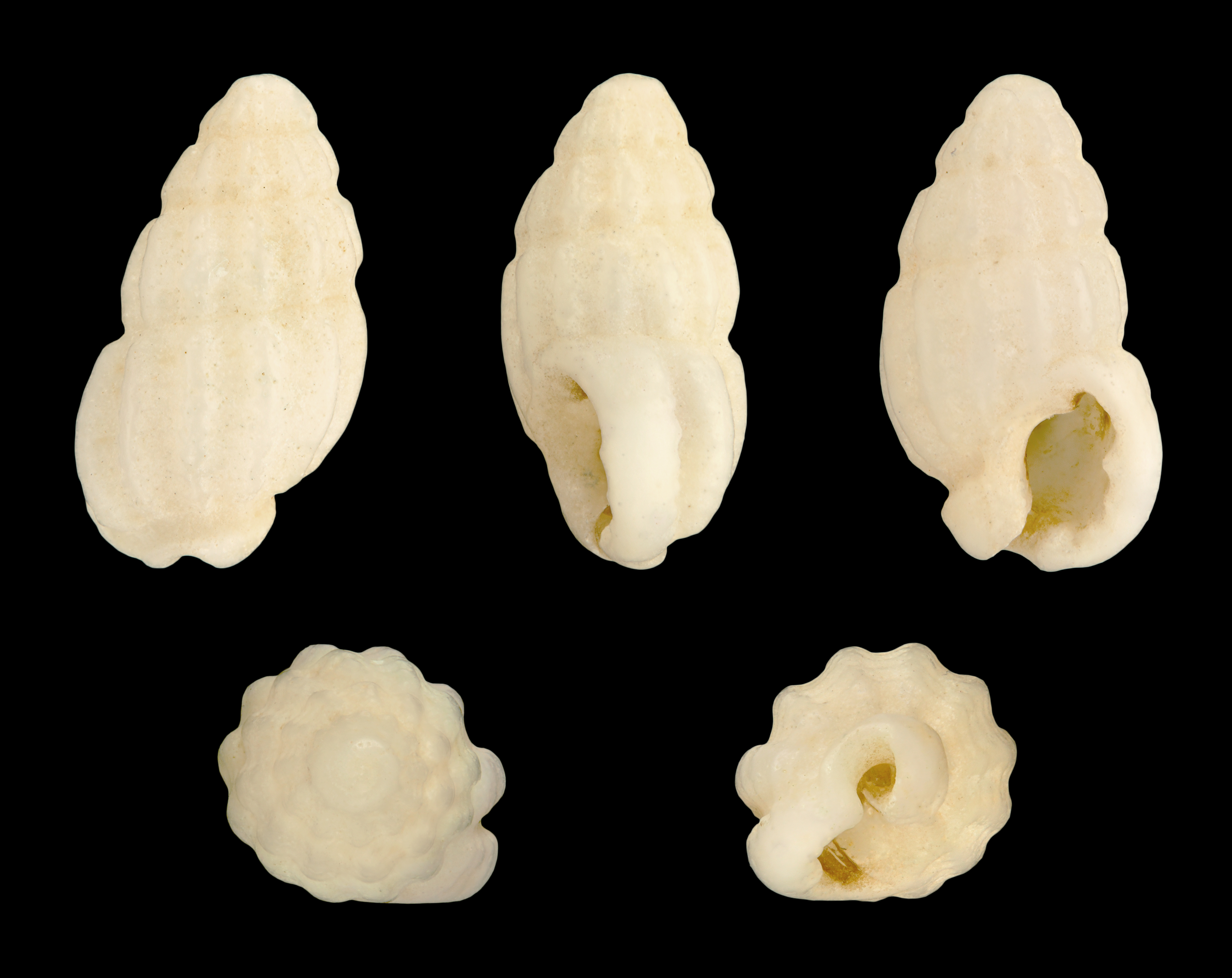
Nassarius (Nassarius) gregarius

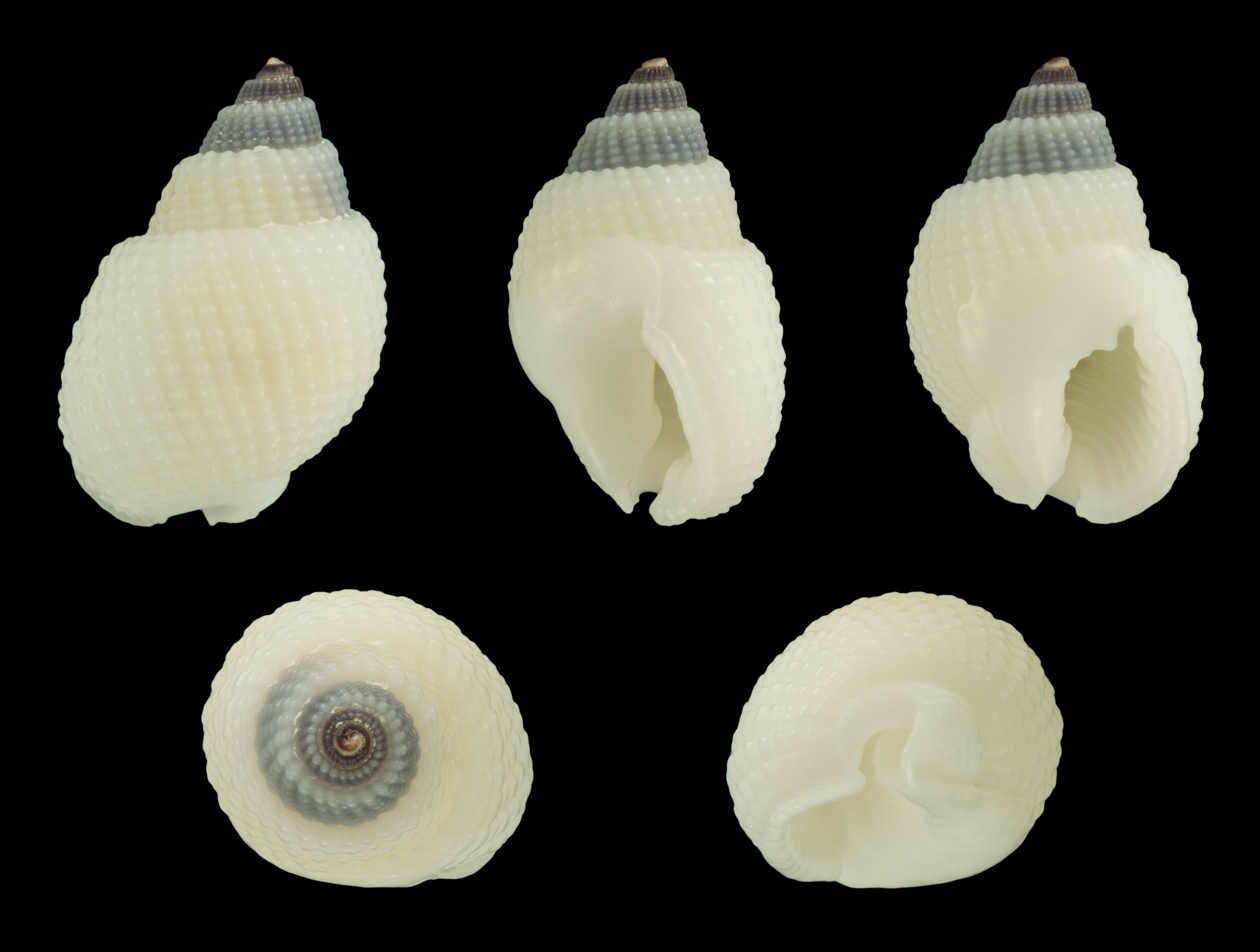
Nassarius (Niotha) albescens albescens

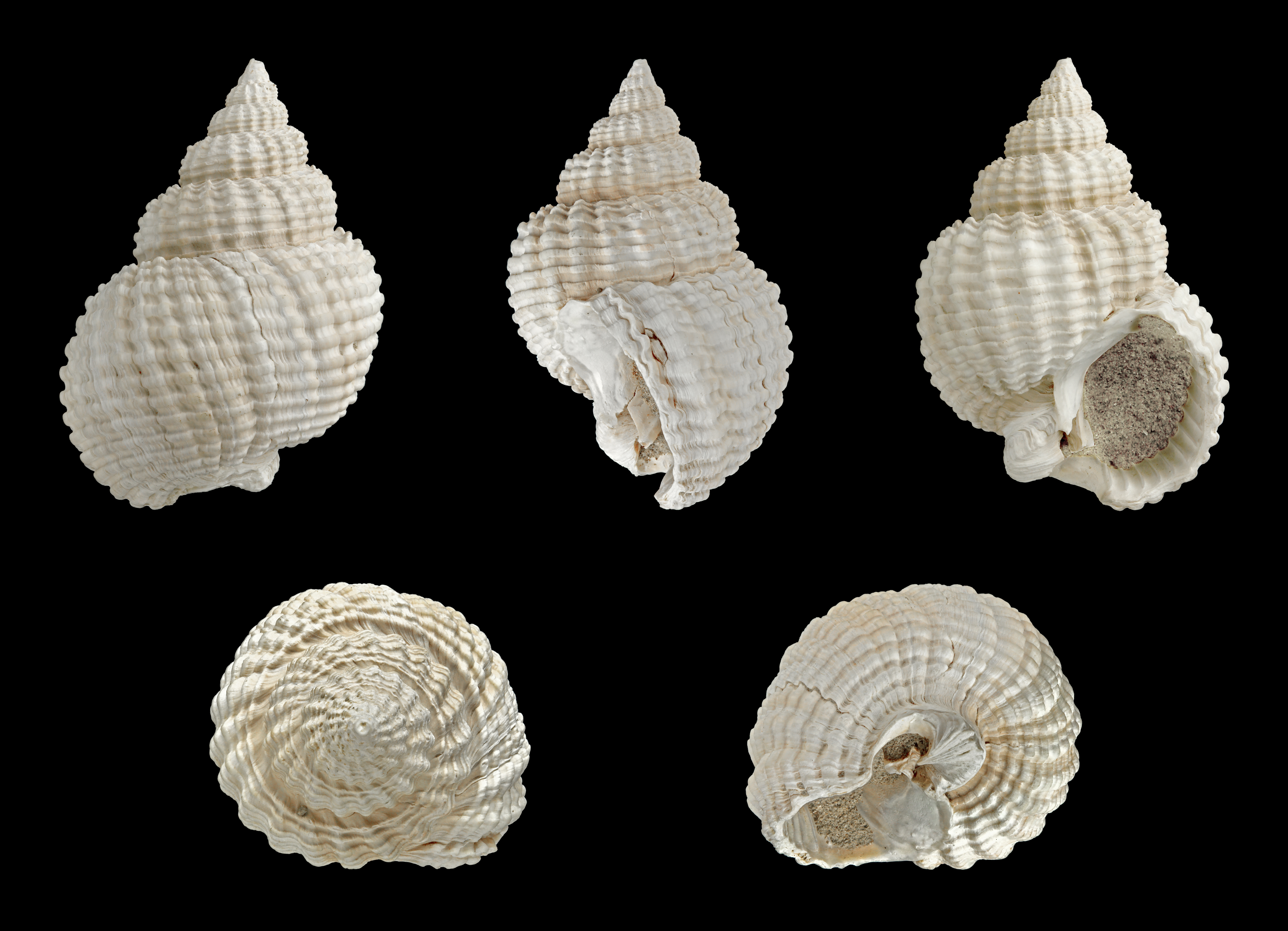
Nassarius (Niotha) conoidalis (fossil)

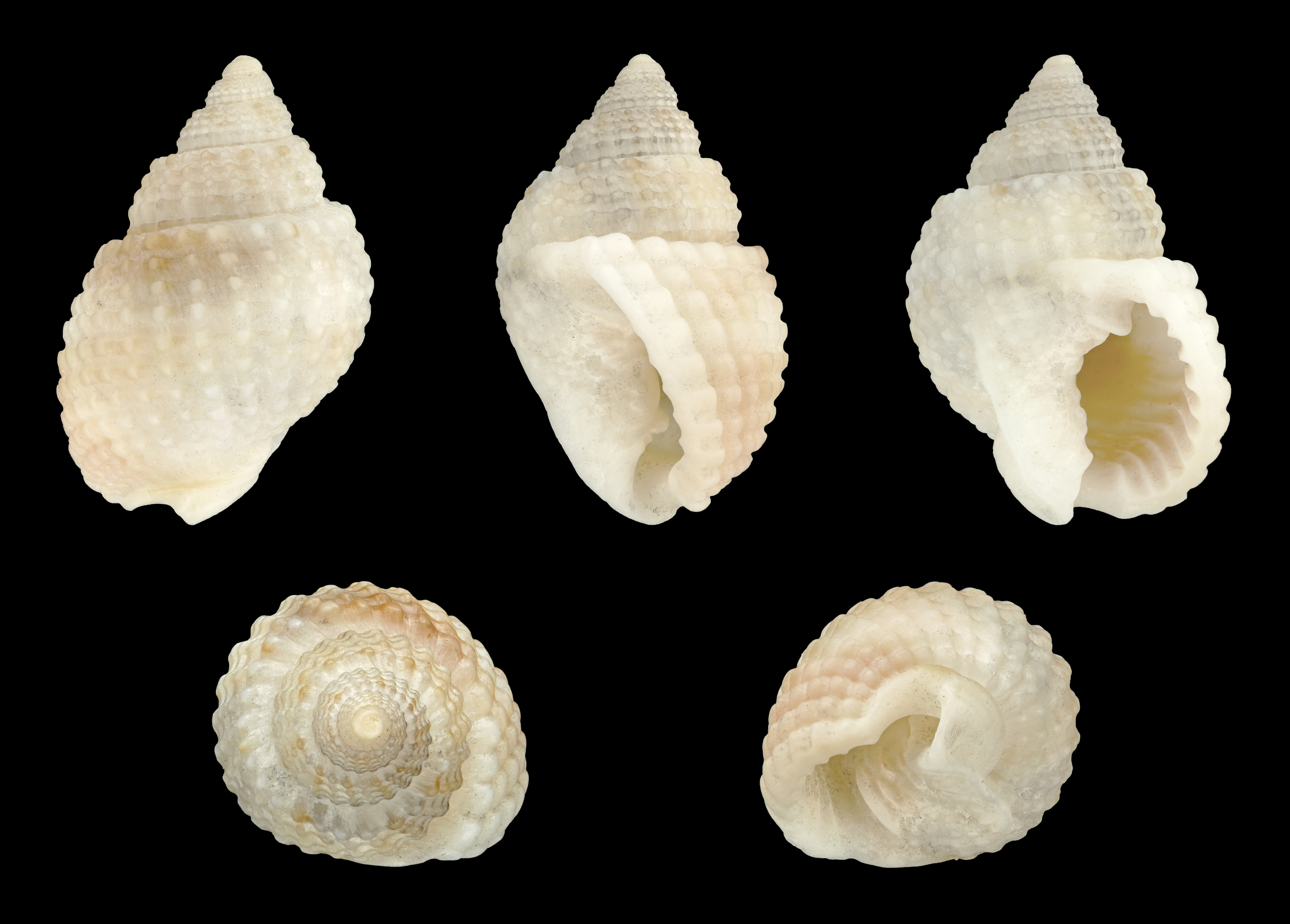
Nassarius (Niotha) conoidalis conoidalis

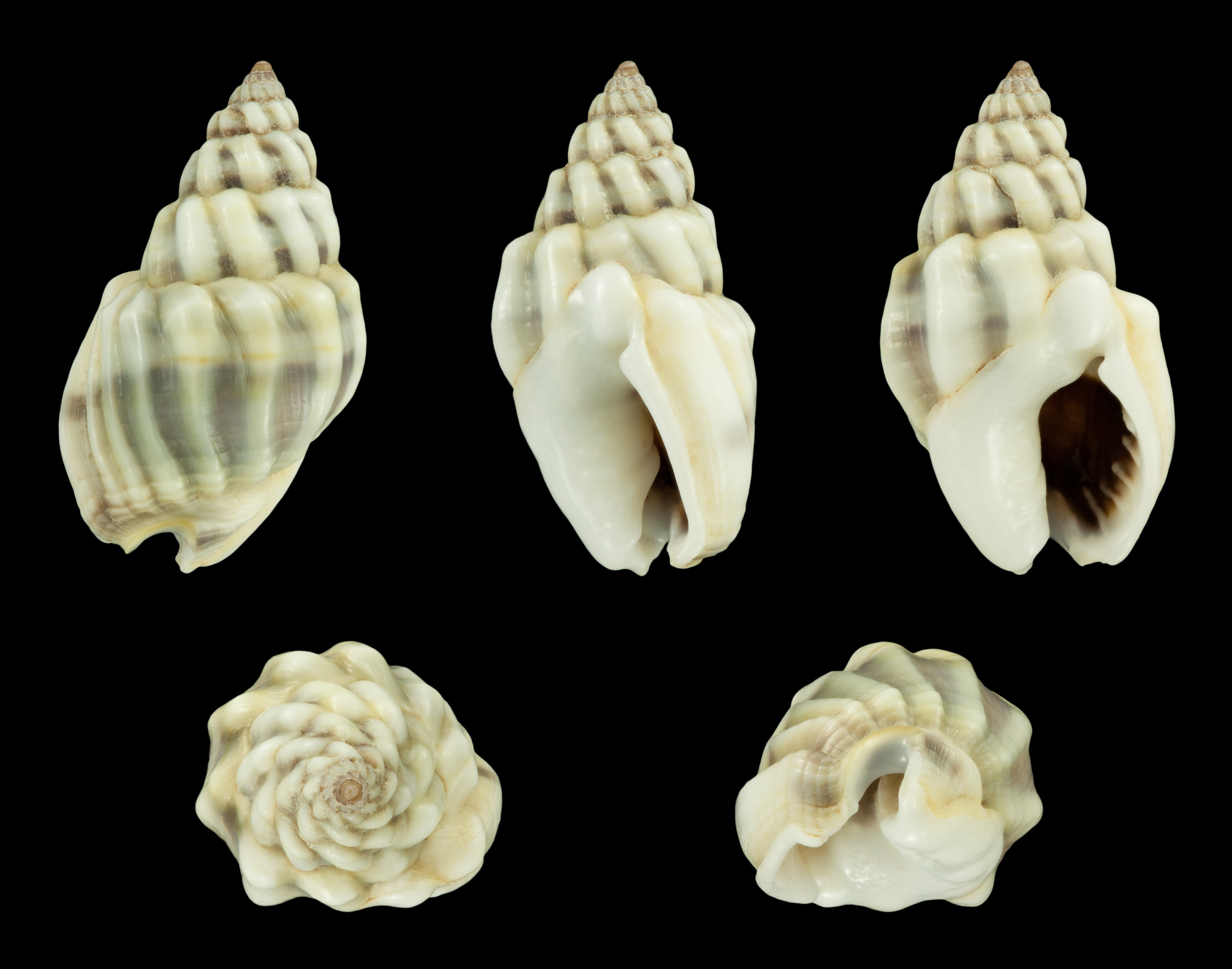
Nassarius (Niotha) coronulus

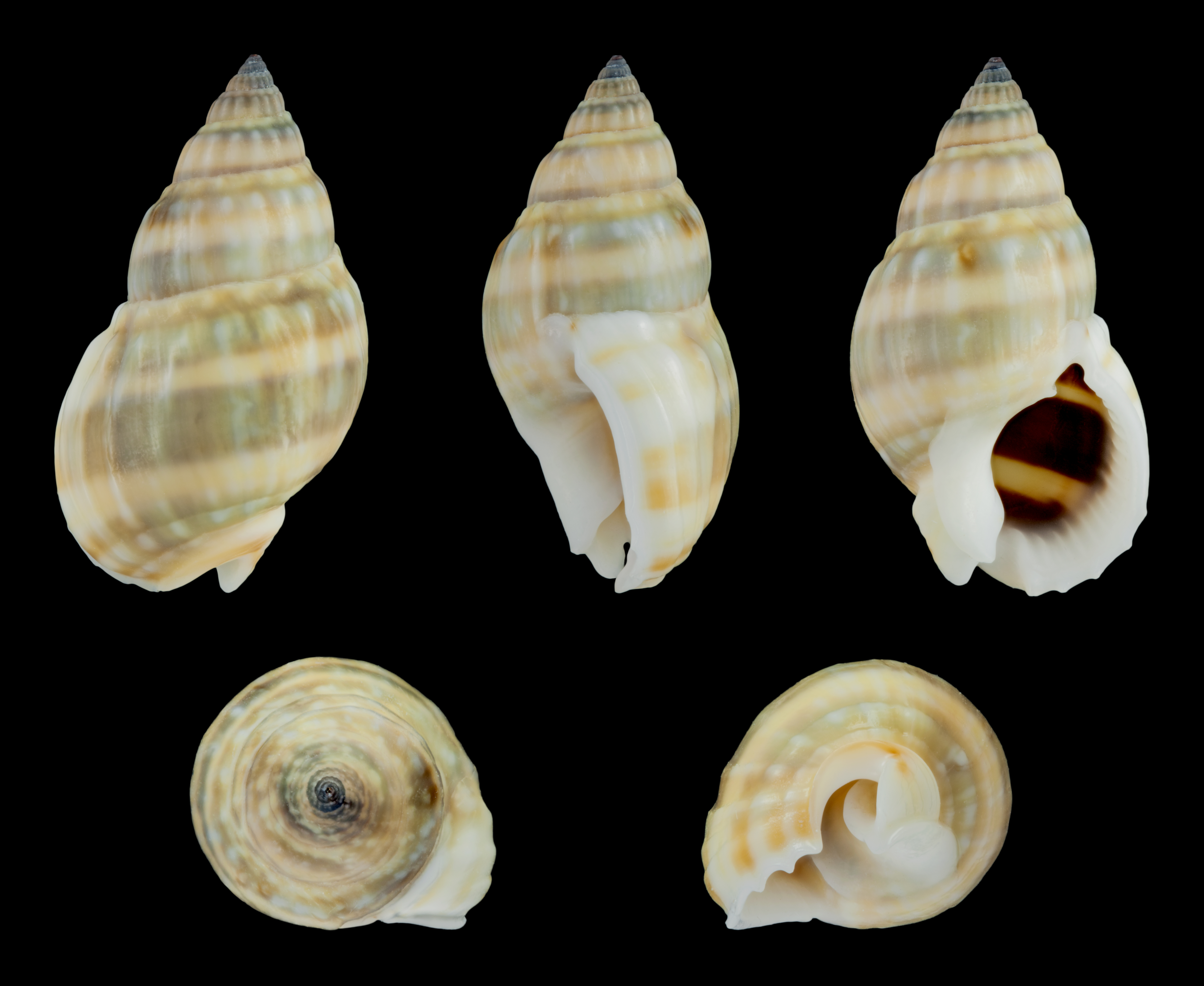
Nassarius (Niotha) distortus (Smooth form)

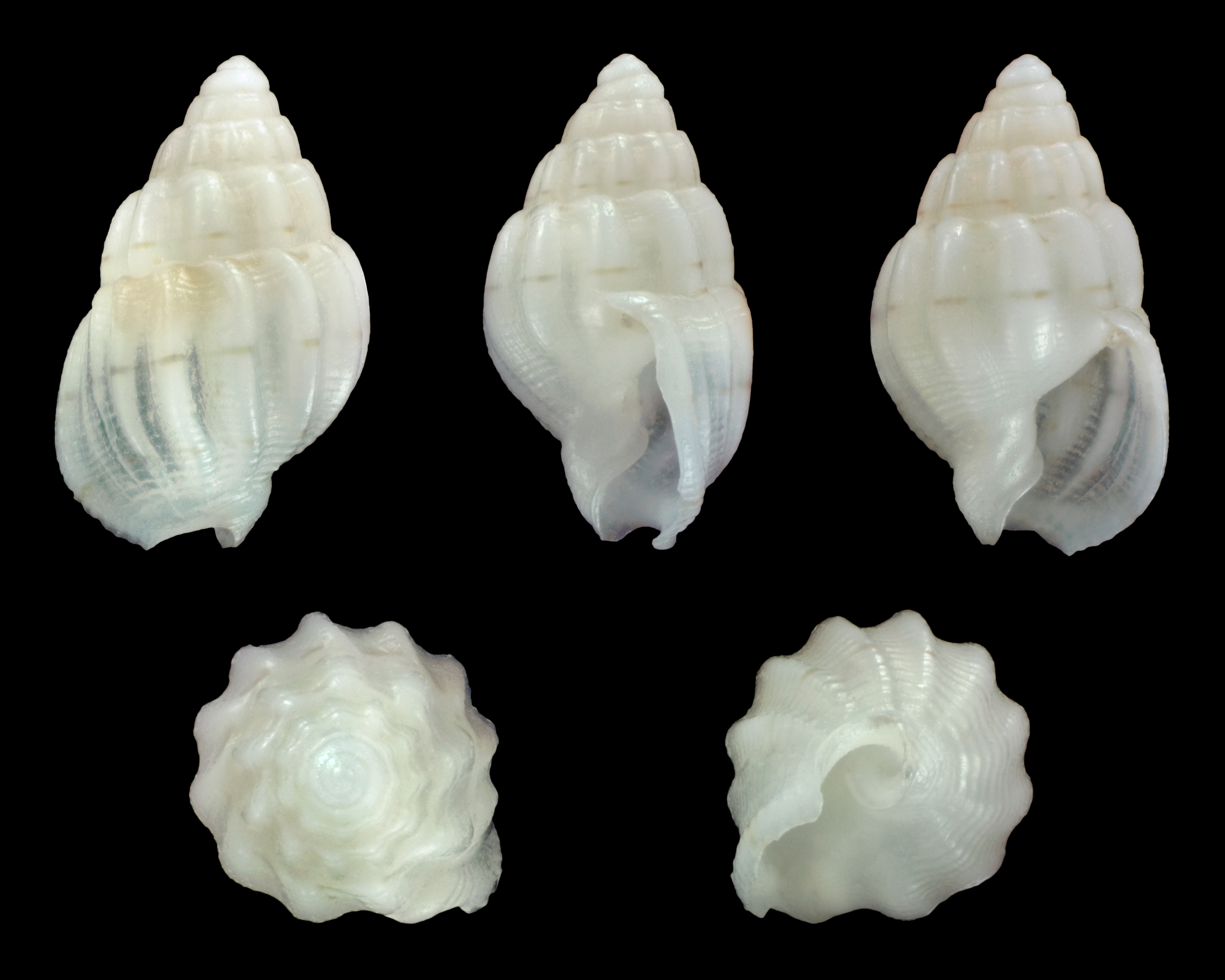
Nassarius (Niotha) ecstilbus

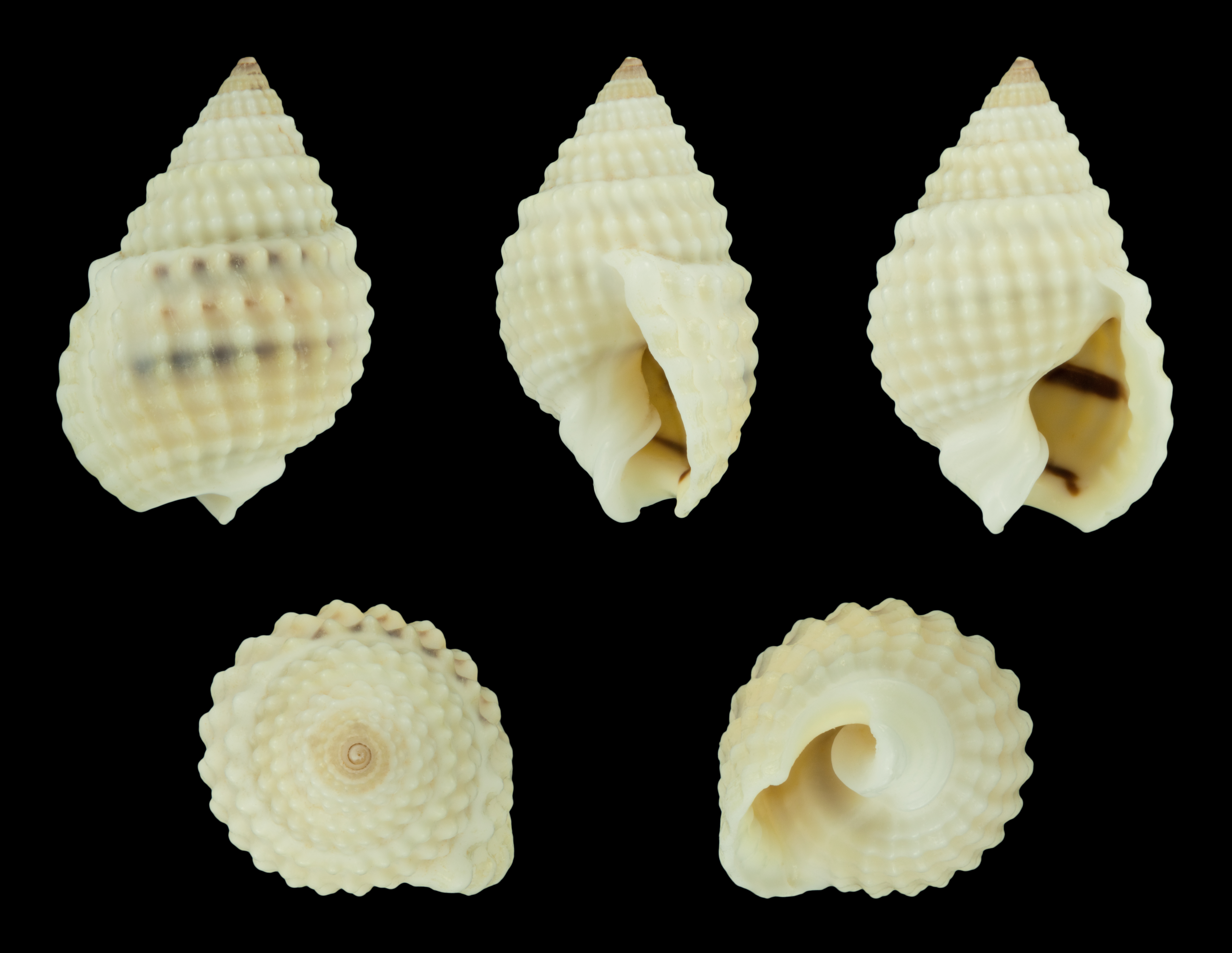
Nassarius (Niotha) gruneri

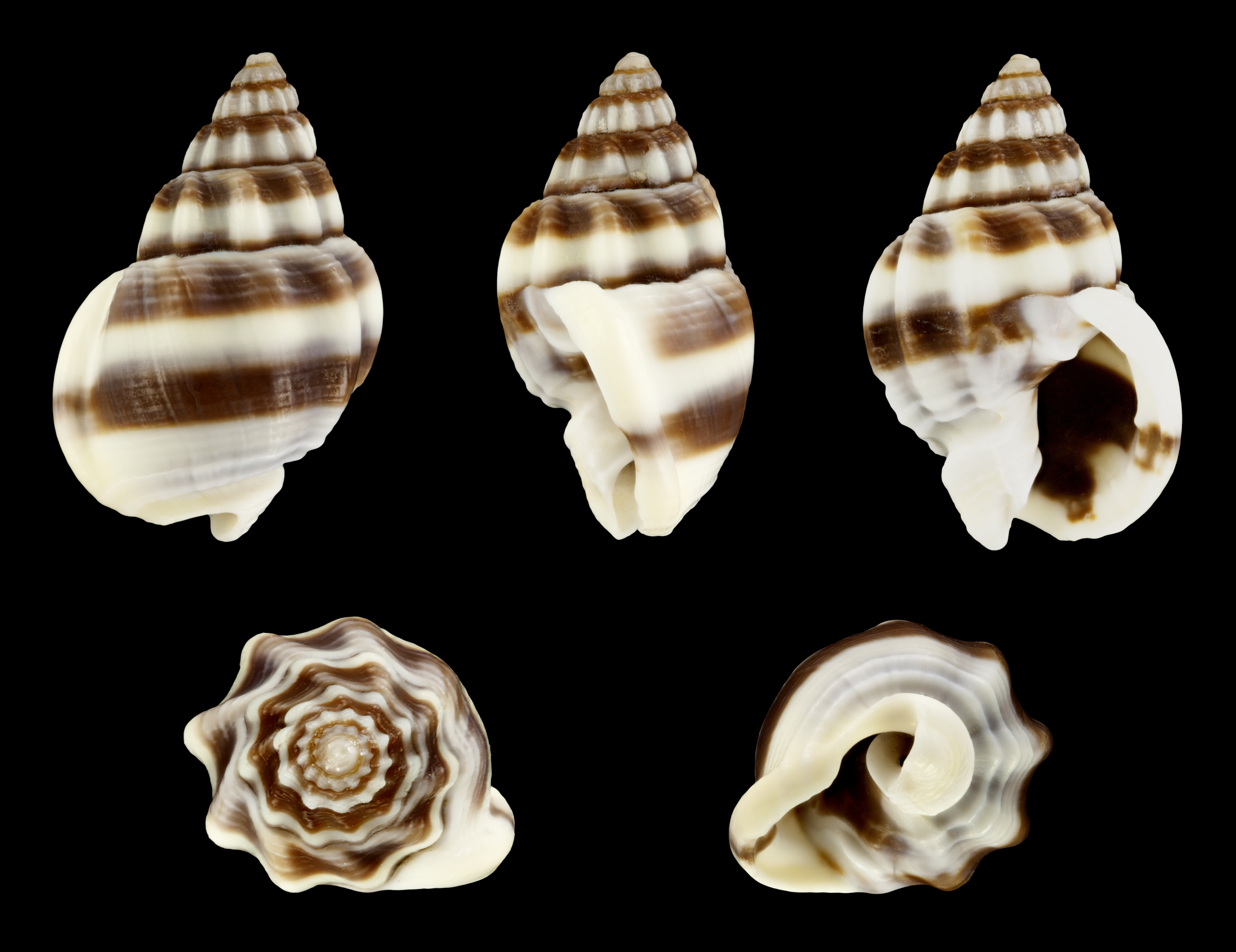
Nassarius (Niotha) jacksonianus

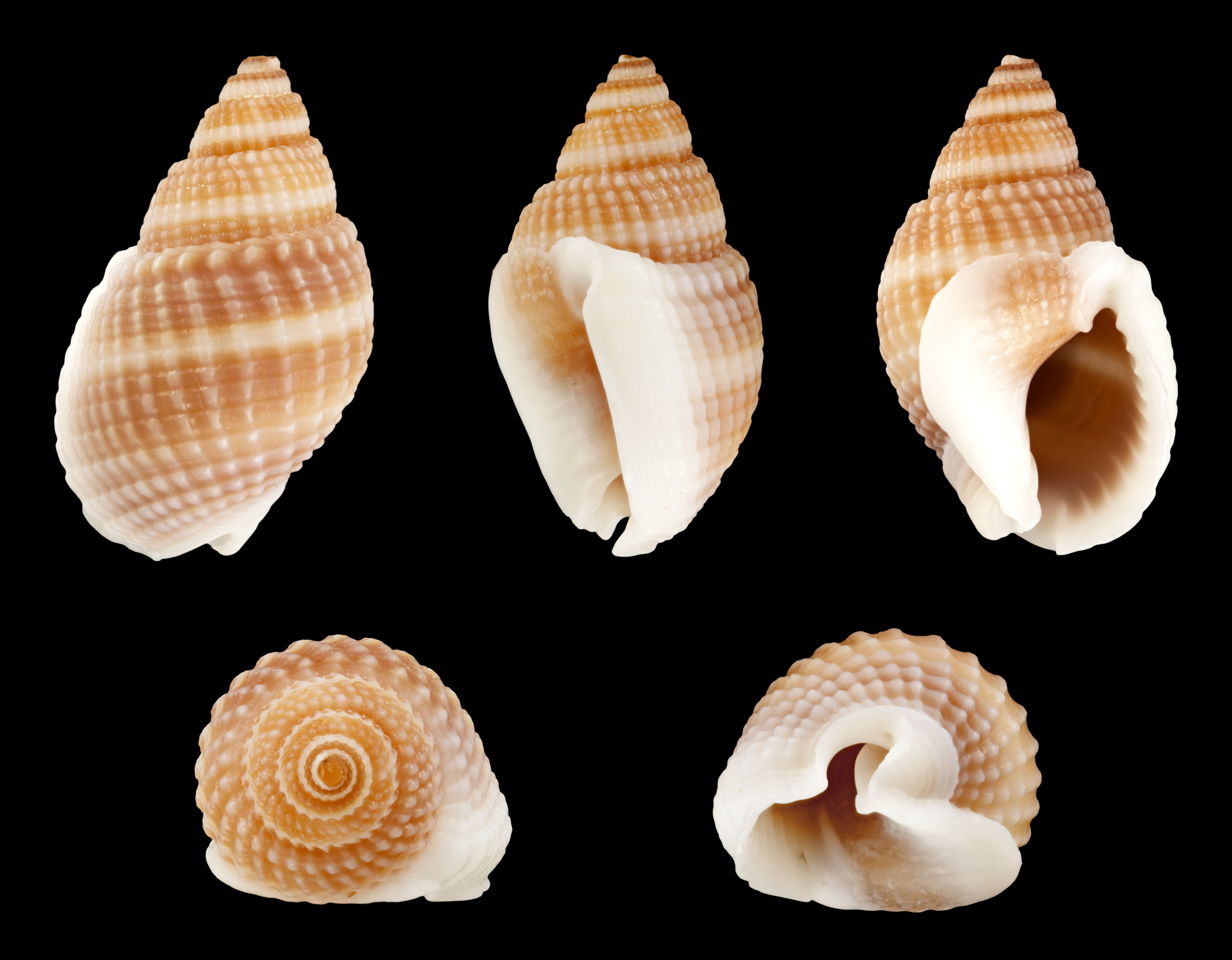
Nassarius (Niotha) livescens

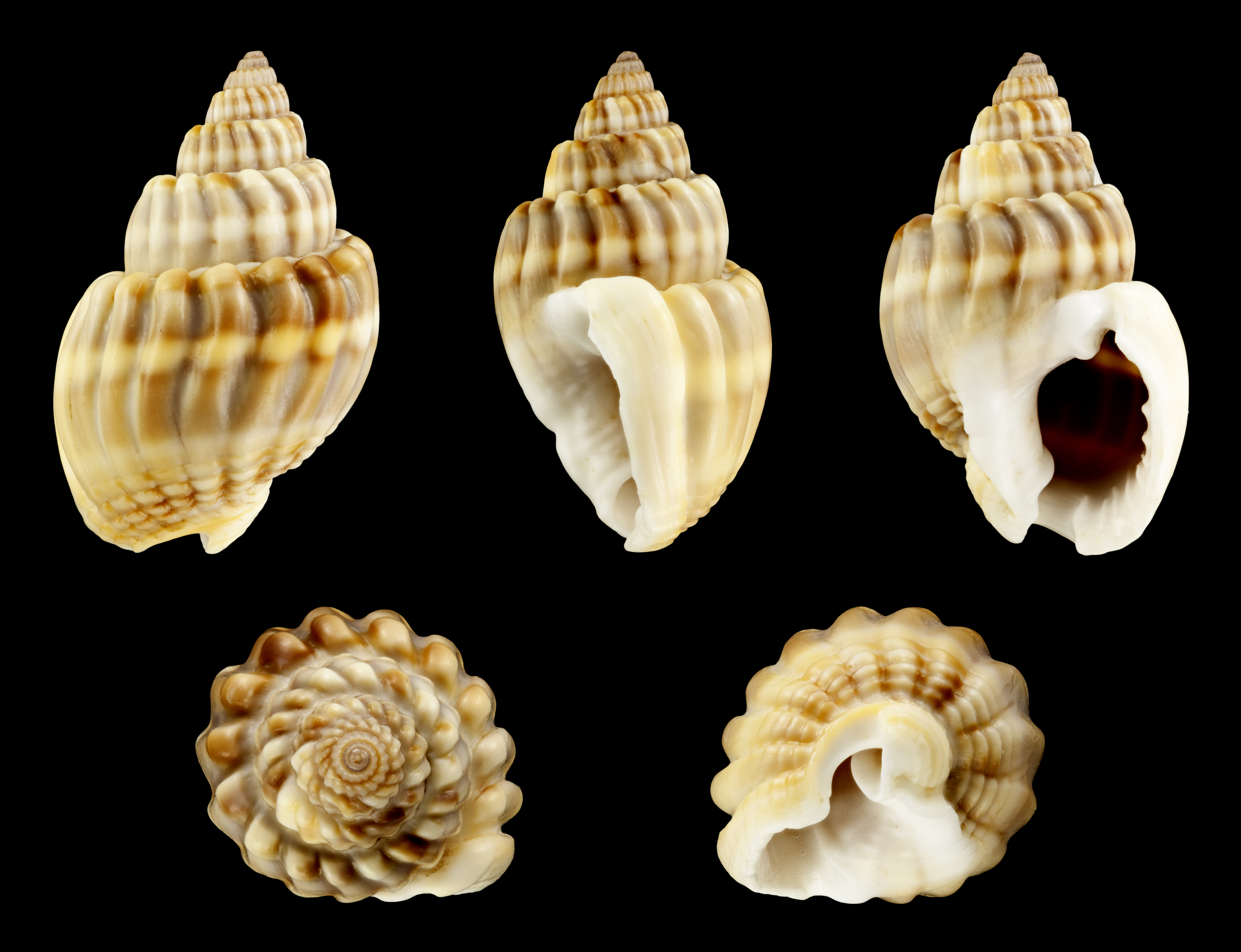
Nassarius (Niotha) nodiferus

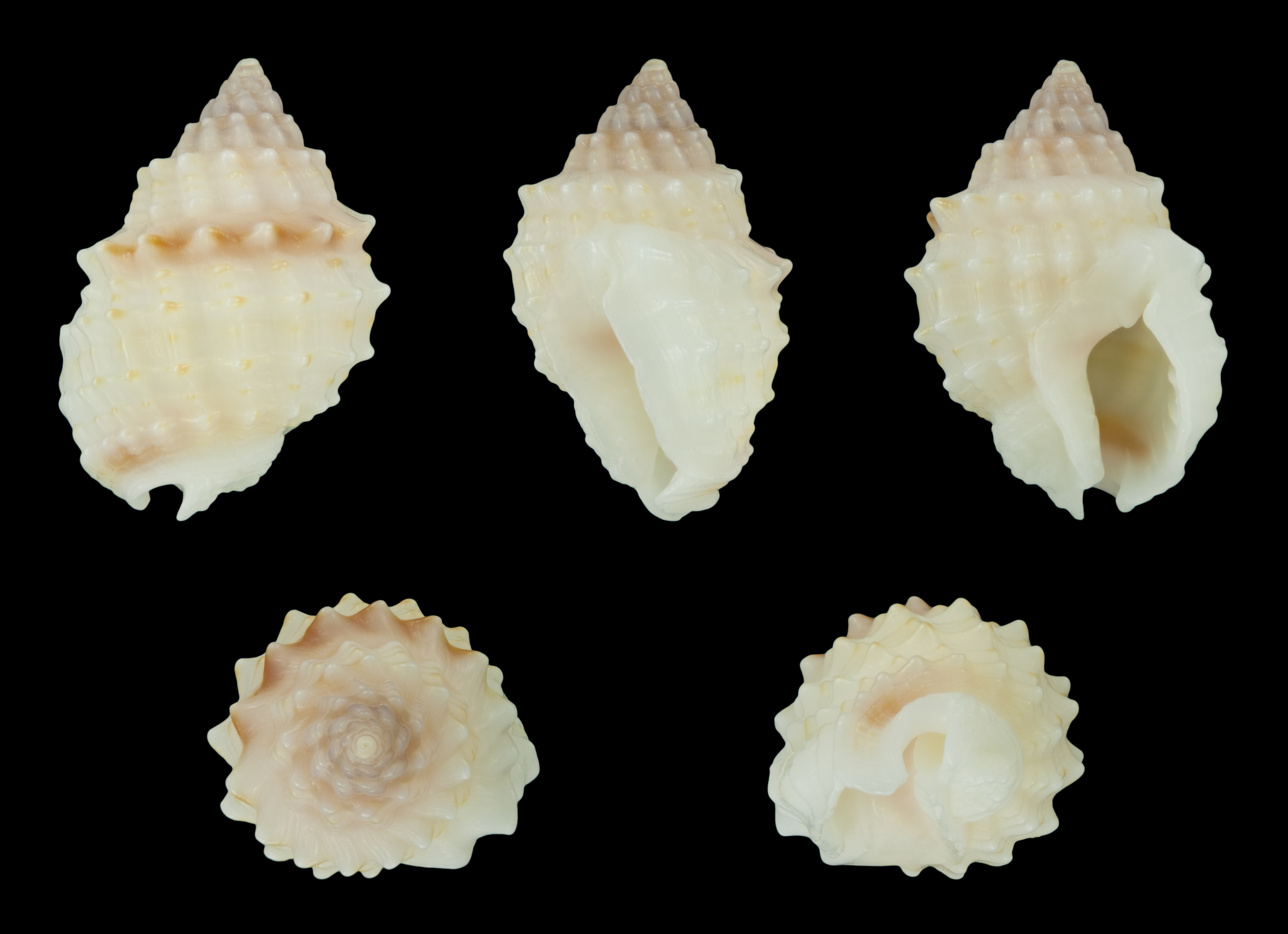
Nassarius (Niotha) quadrasi

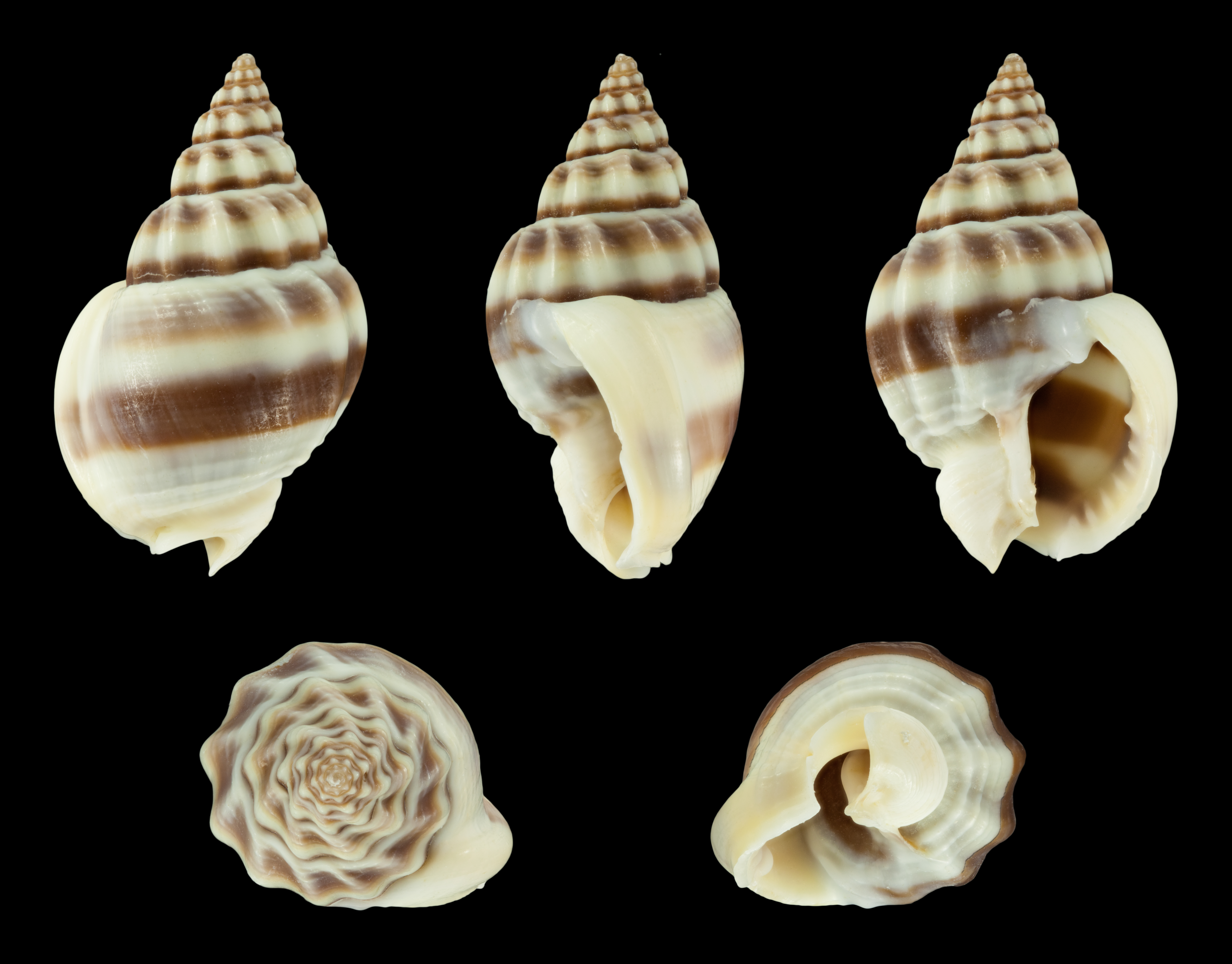
Nassarius (Niotha) stolatus

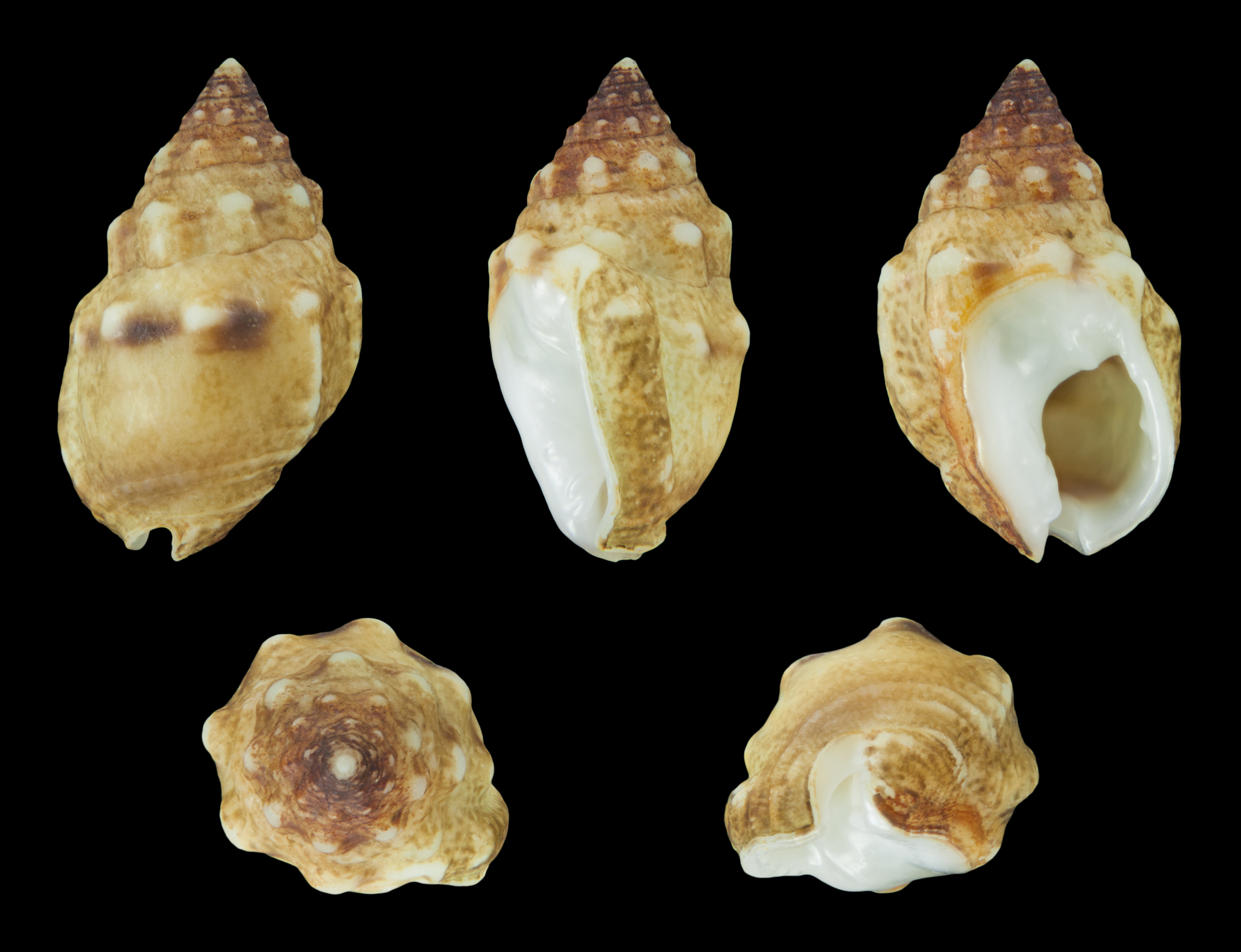
Nassarius (Niotha) tiarula

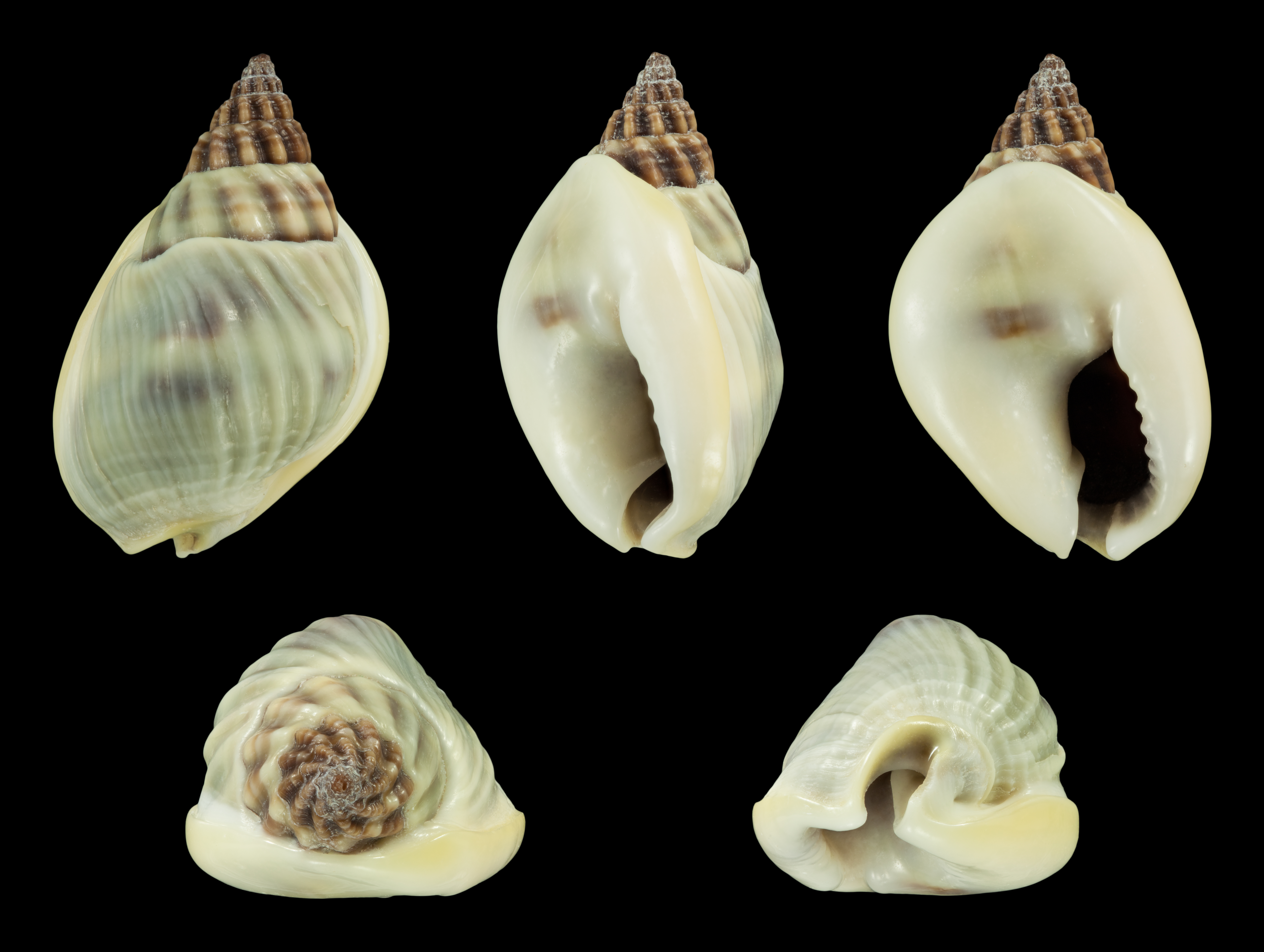
Nassarius (Plicarcularia) bellulus

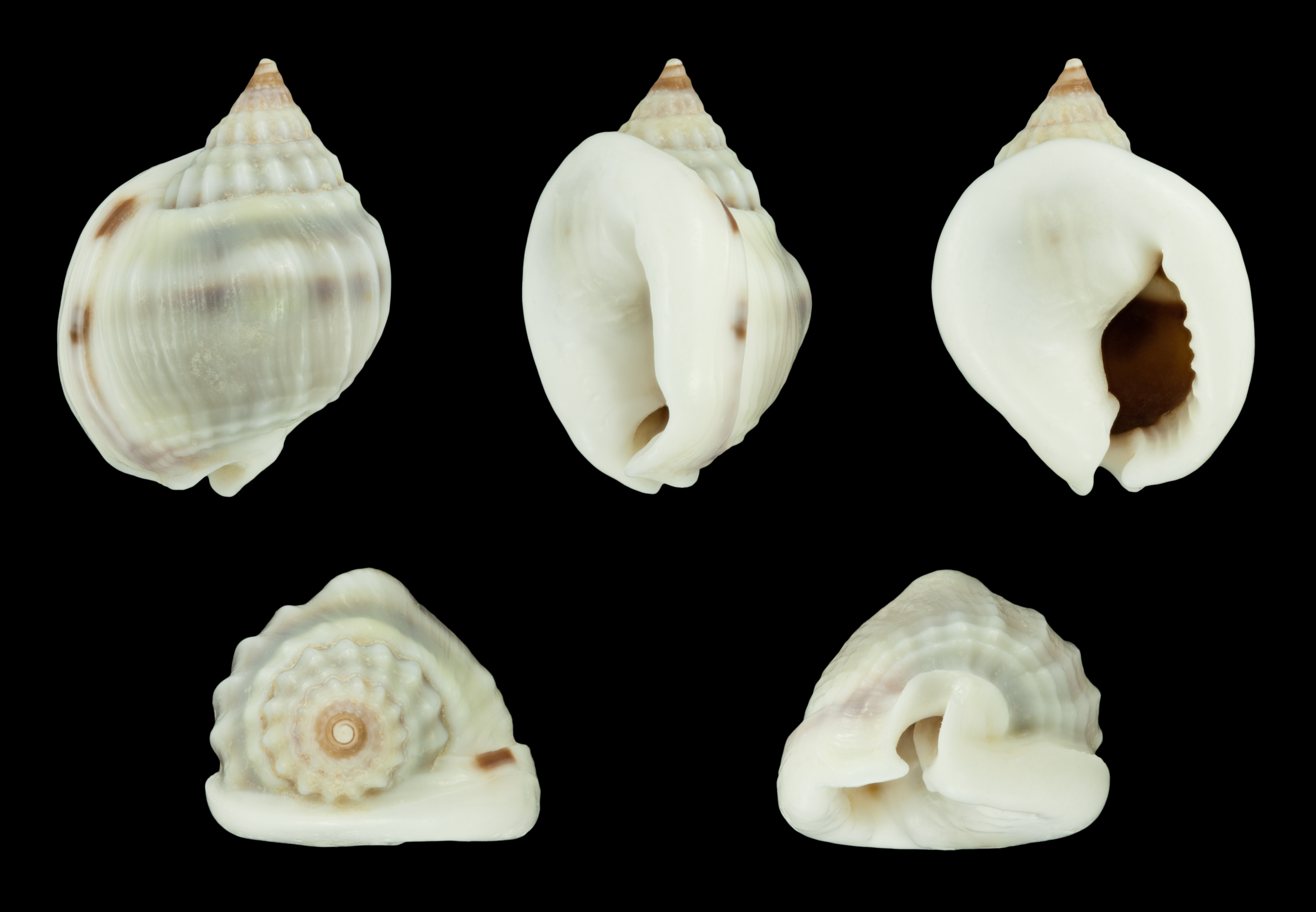
Nassarius (Plicarcularia) bimaculosus

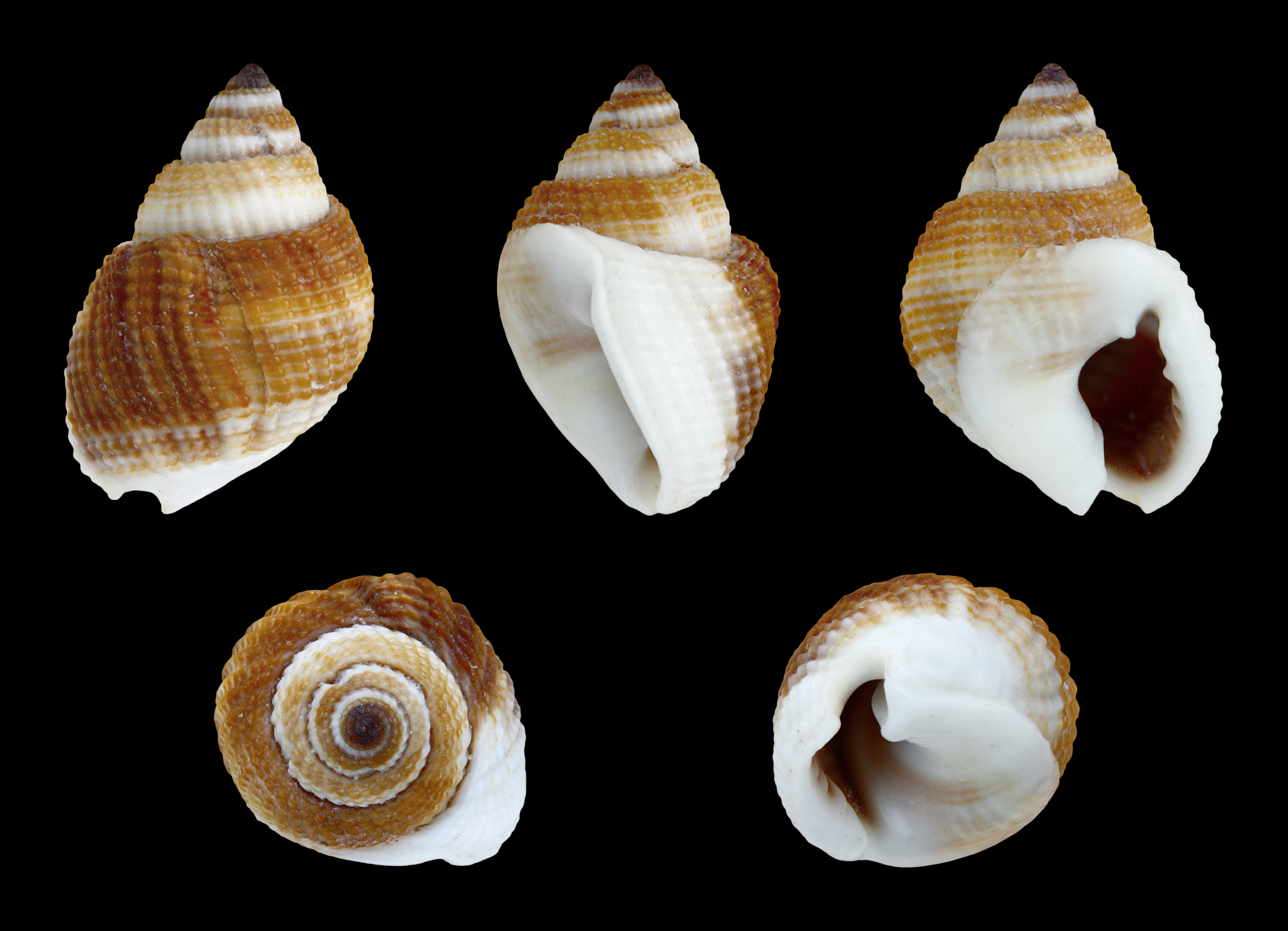
Nassarius (Plicarcularia) elegantissimus

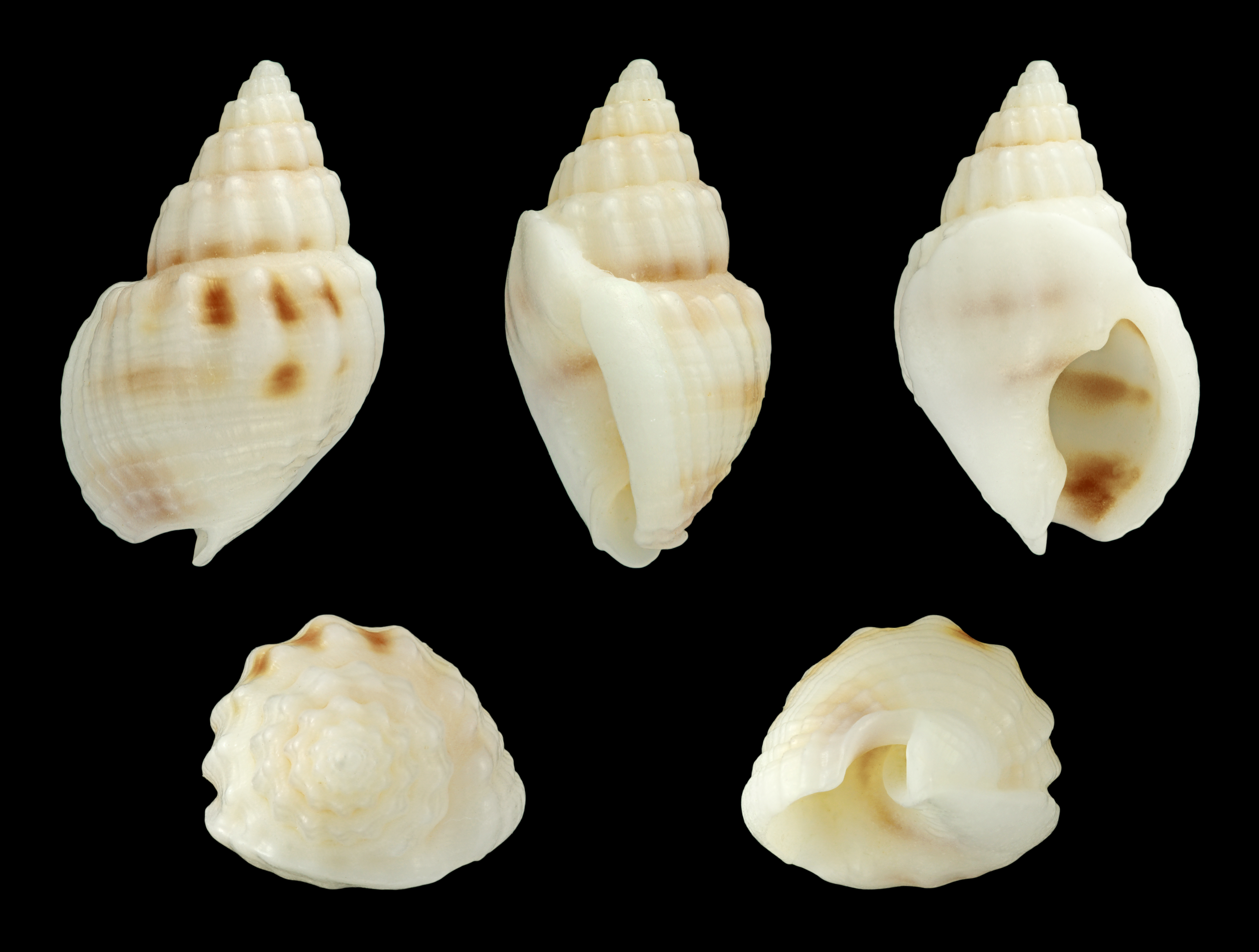
Nassarius (Plicarcularia) fissilabris

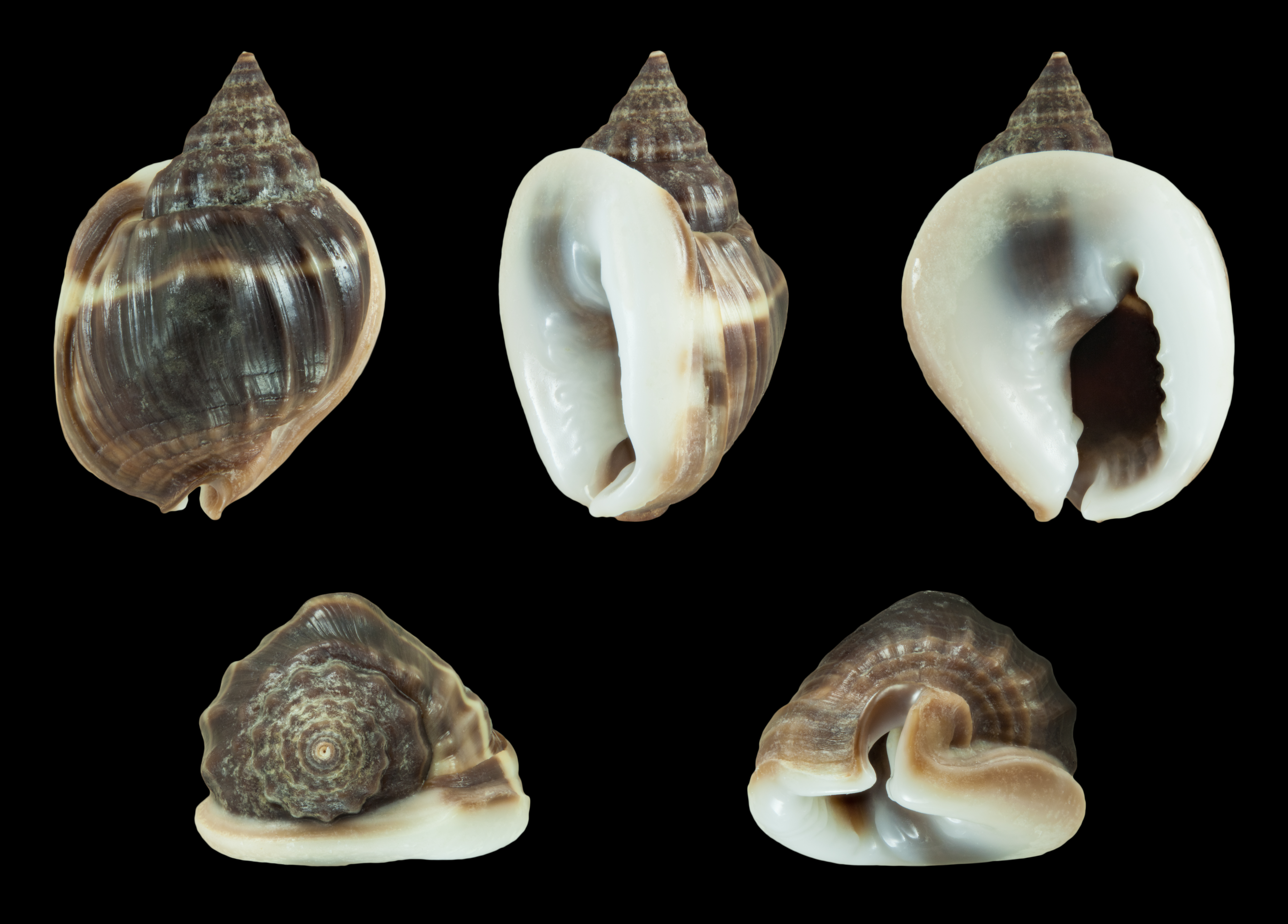
Nassarius (Plicarcularia) pullus

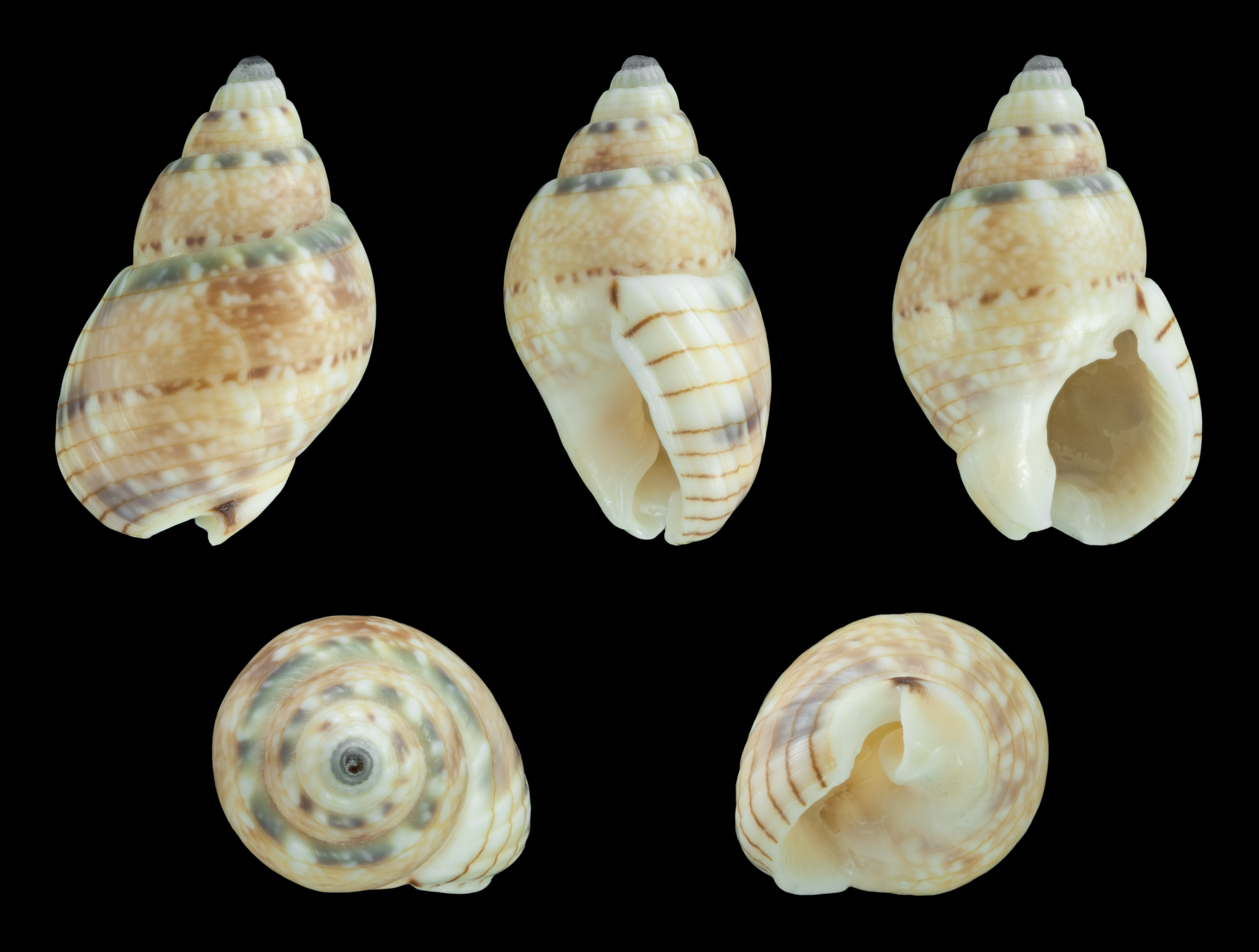
Nassarius (Telasco) limnaeiformis

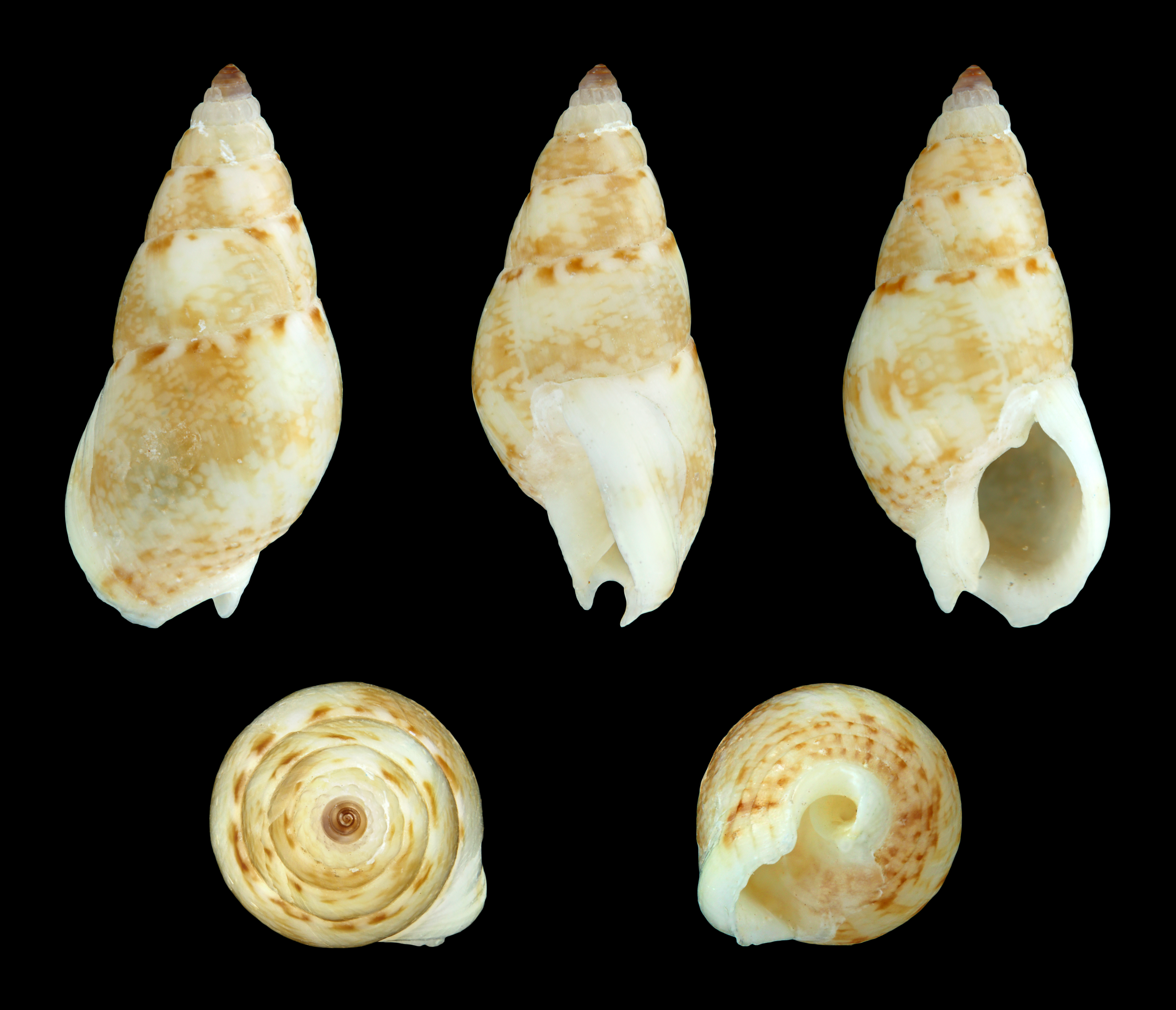
Nassarius (Telasco) multipunctatus

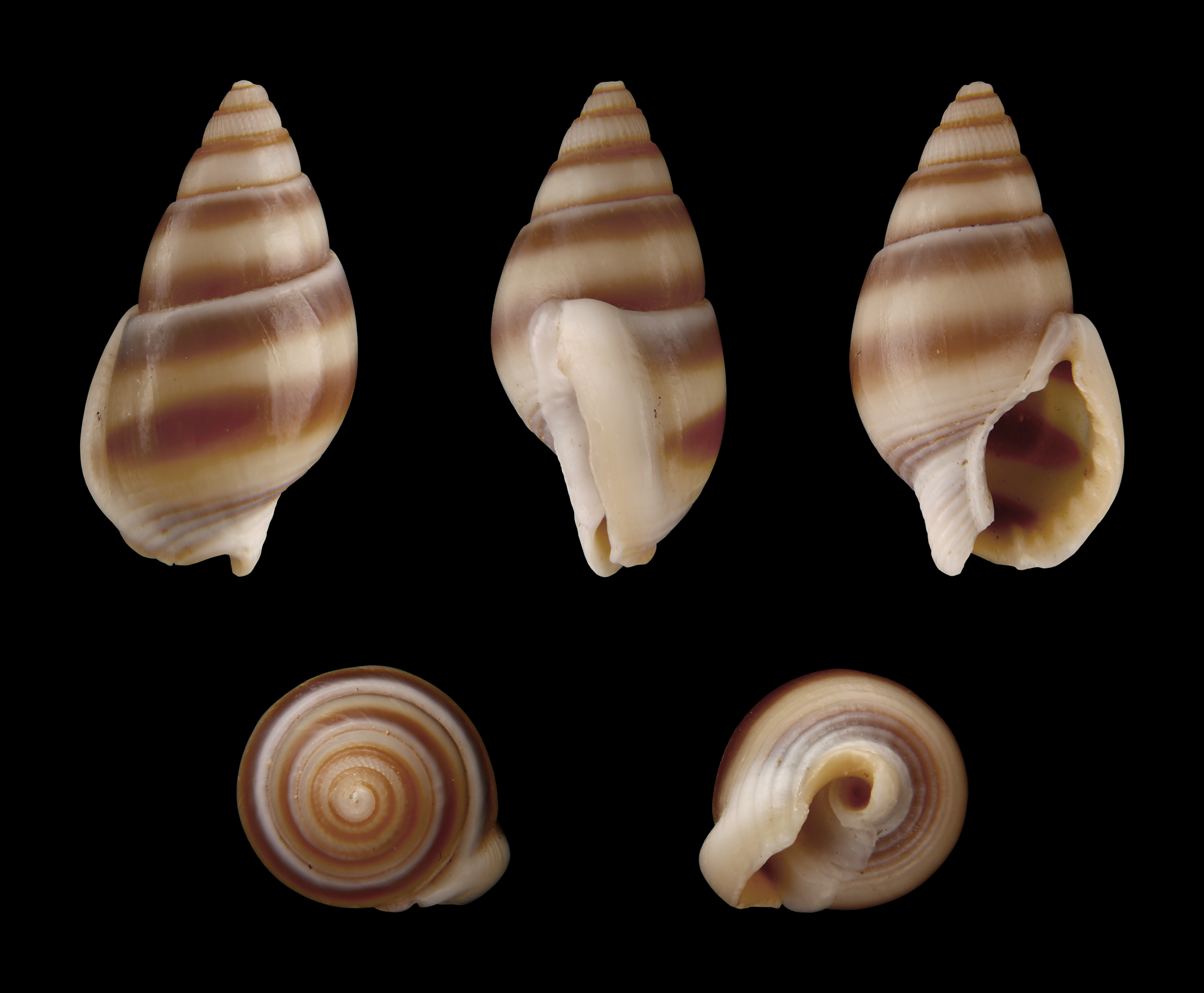
Nassarius (Telasco) reeveanus f. zonalis

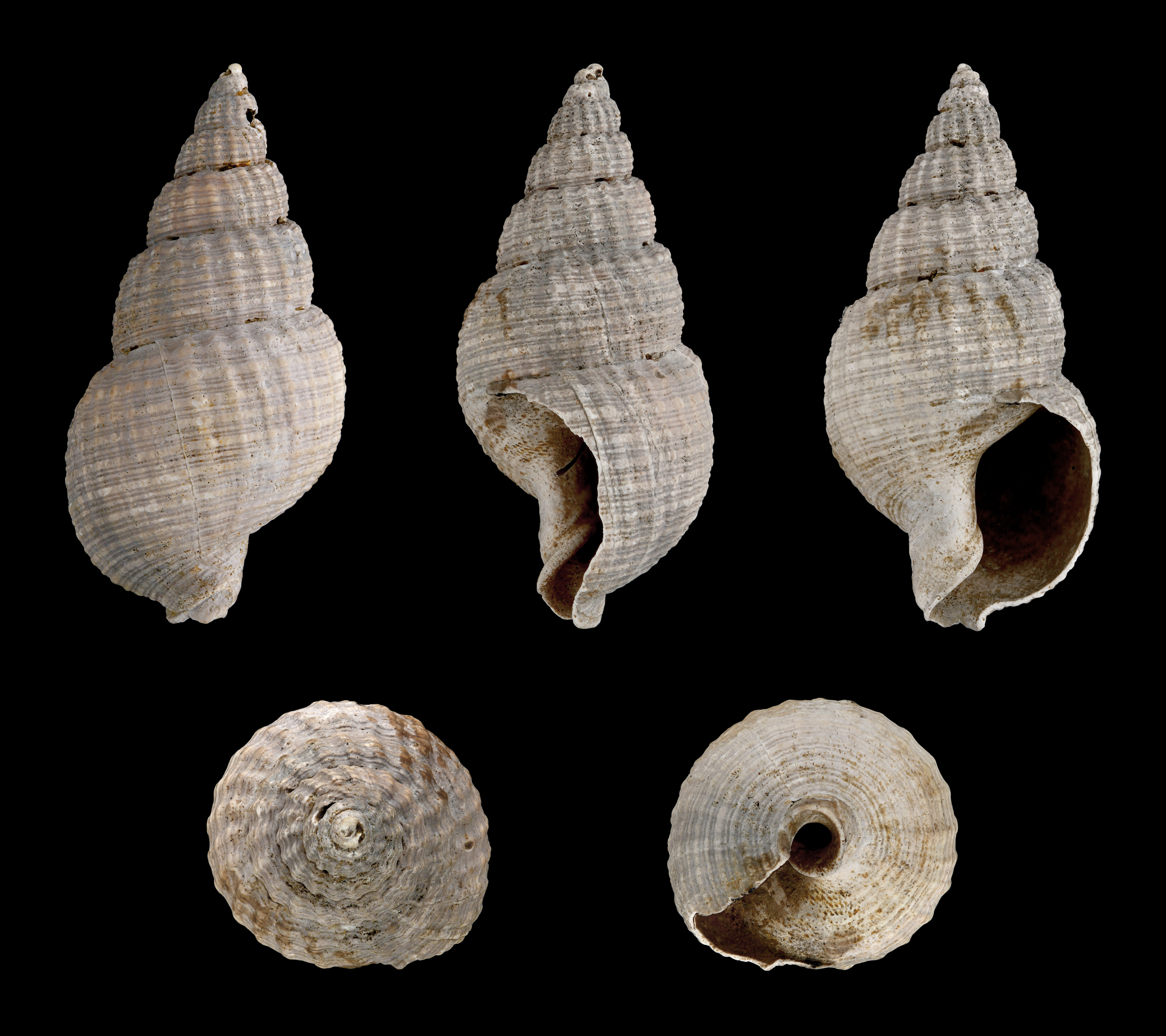
Nassarius (Uzita) reticosus

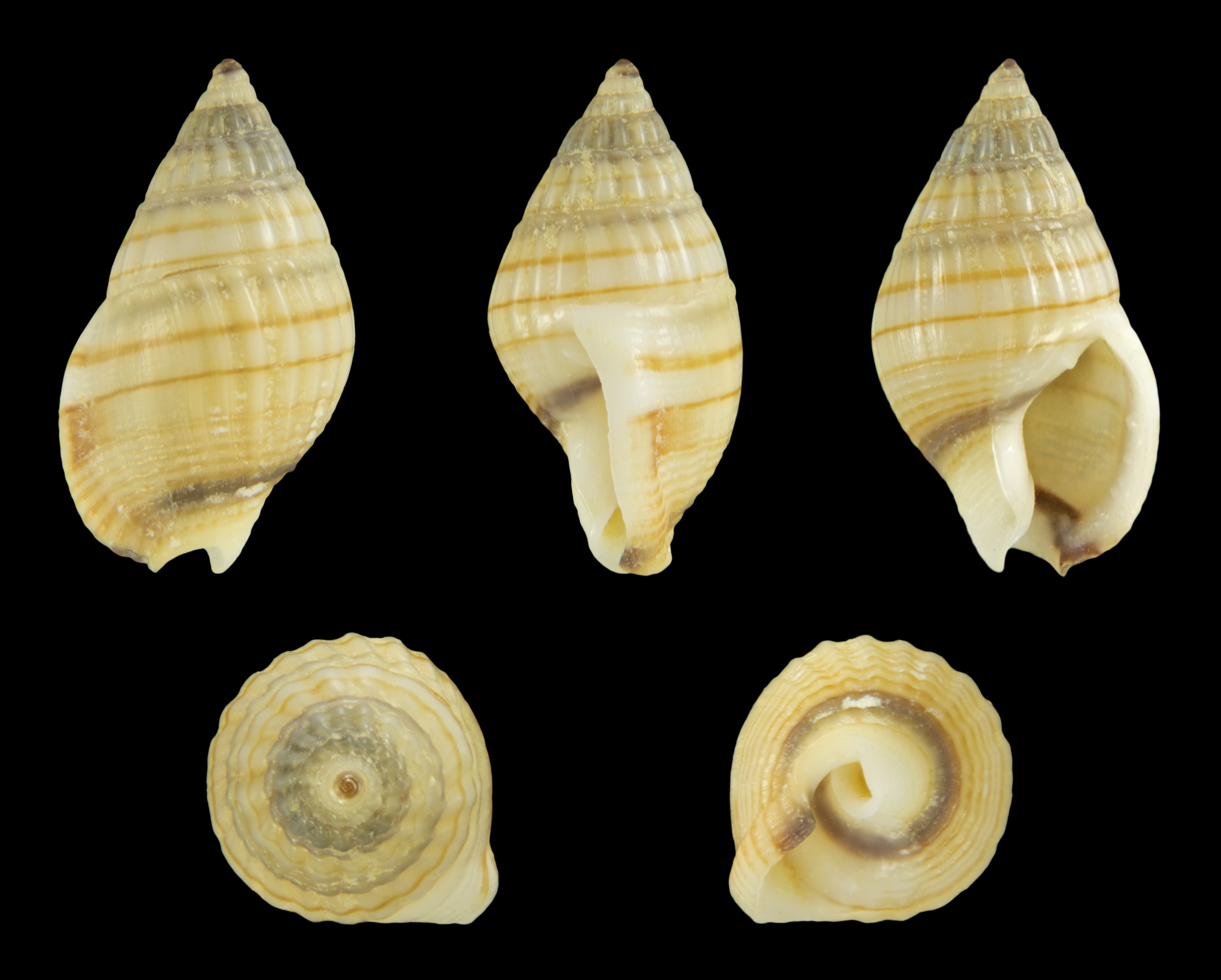
Nassarius (Zeuxis) celebensis

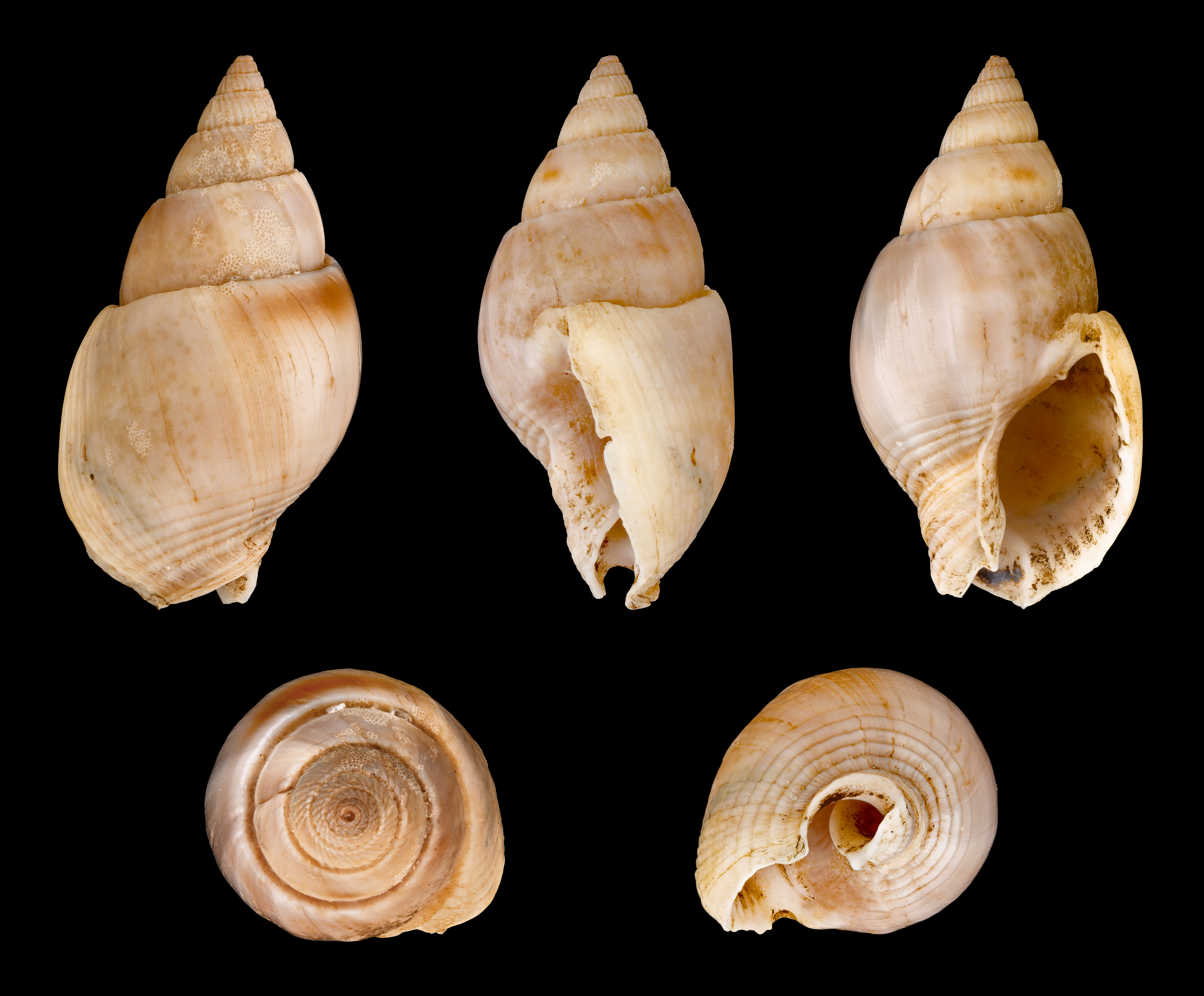
Nassarius (Zeuxis) dorsatus

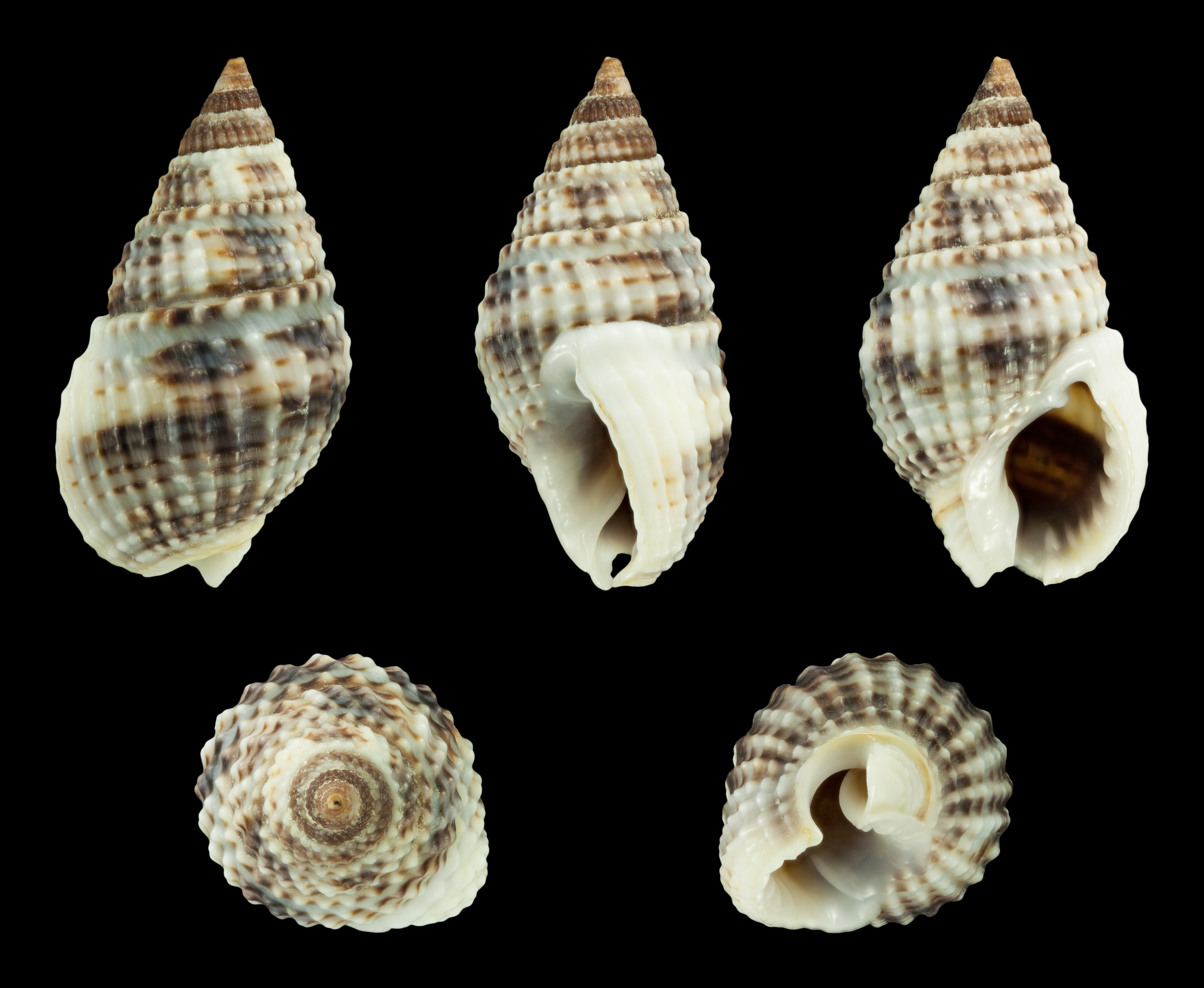
Nassarius (Zeuxis) margaritifer

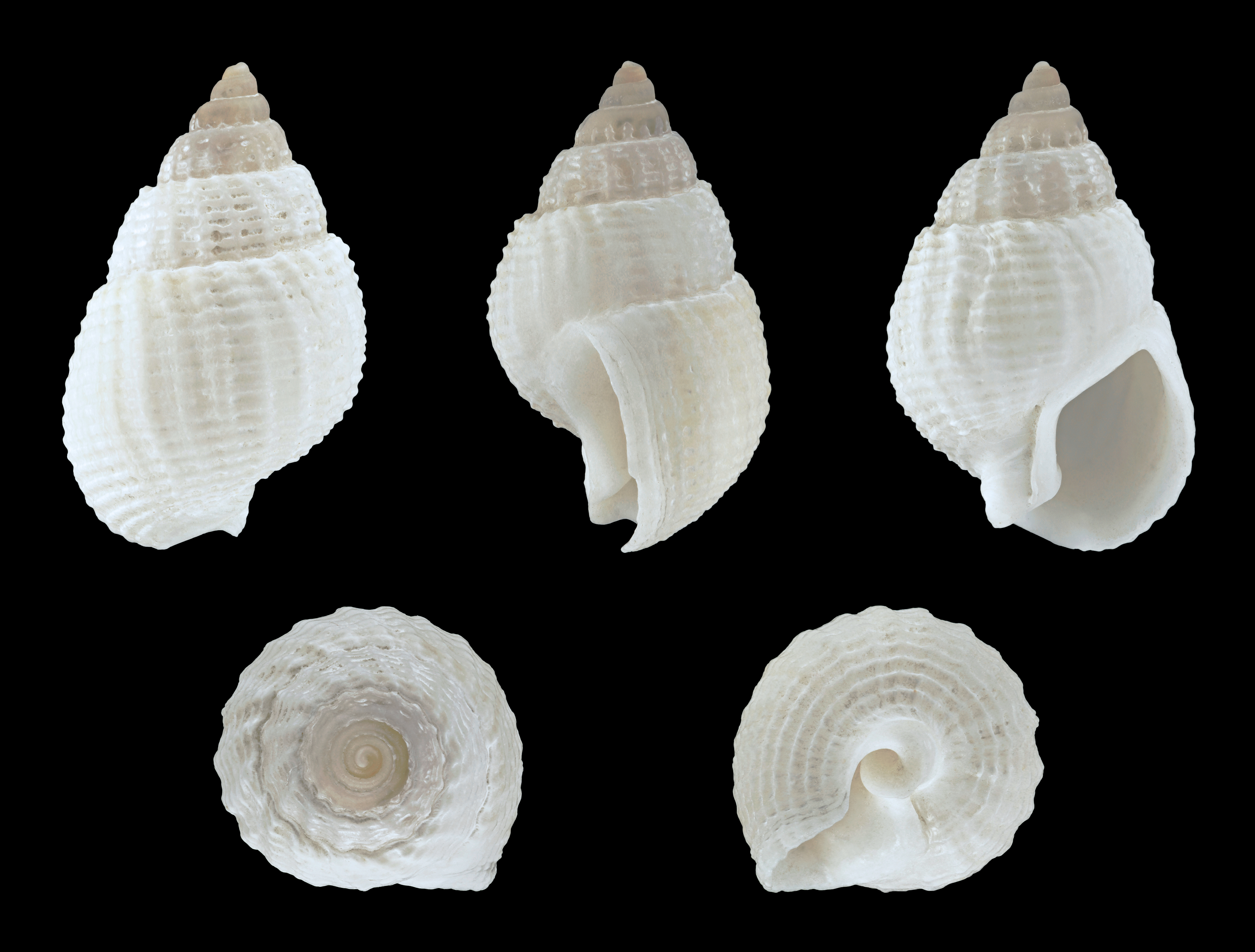
Nassarius (Zeuxis) niveus

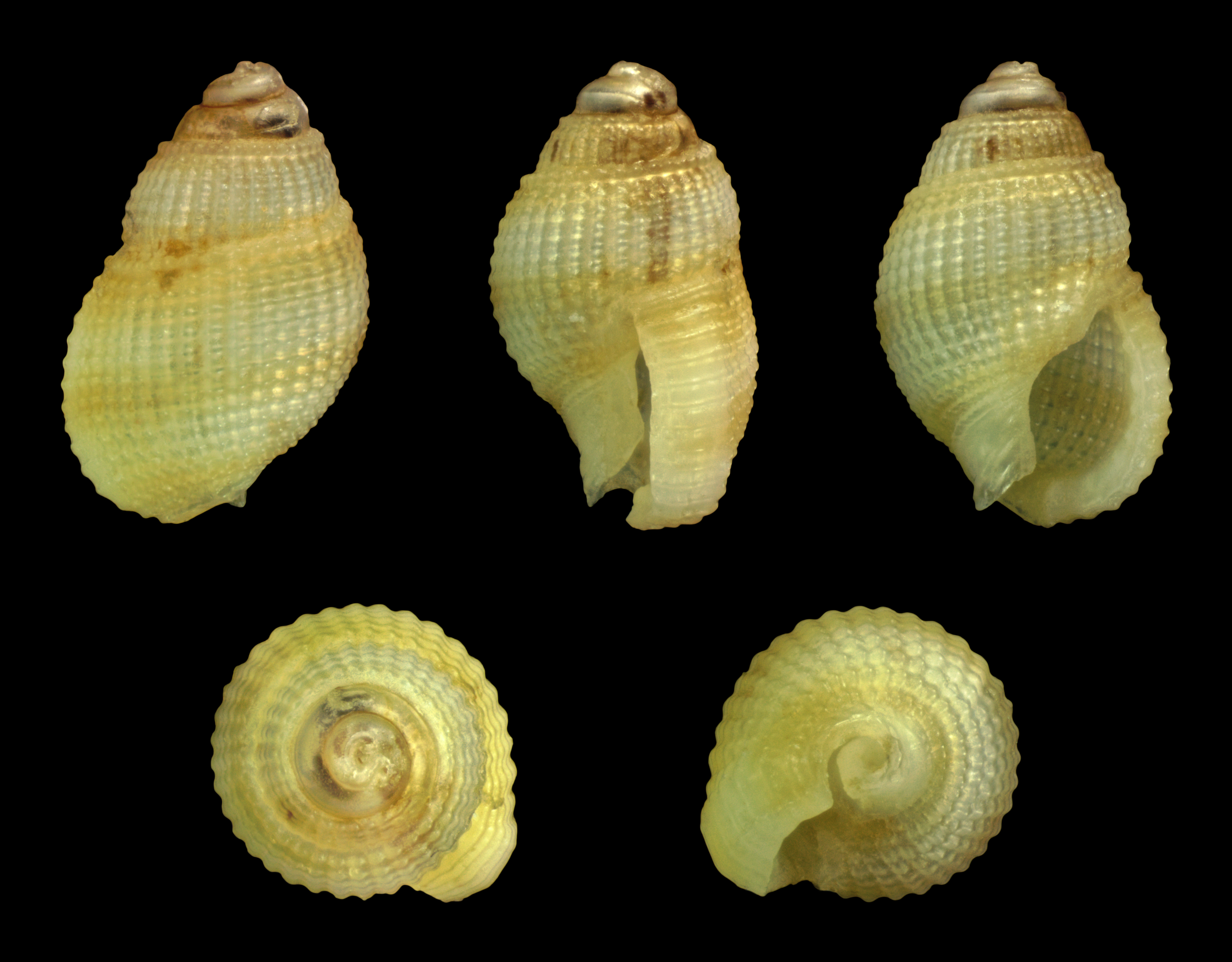
Nassarius (Zeuxis) ocellatus

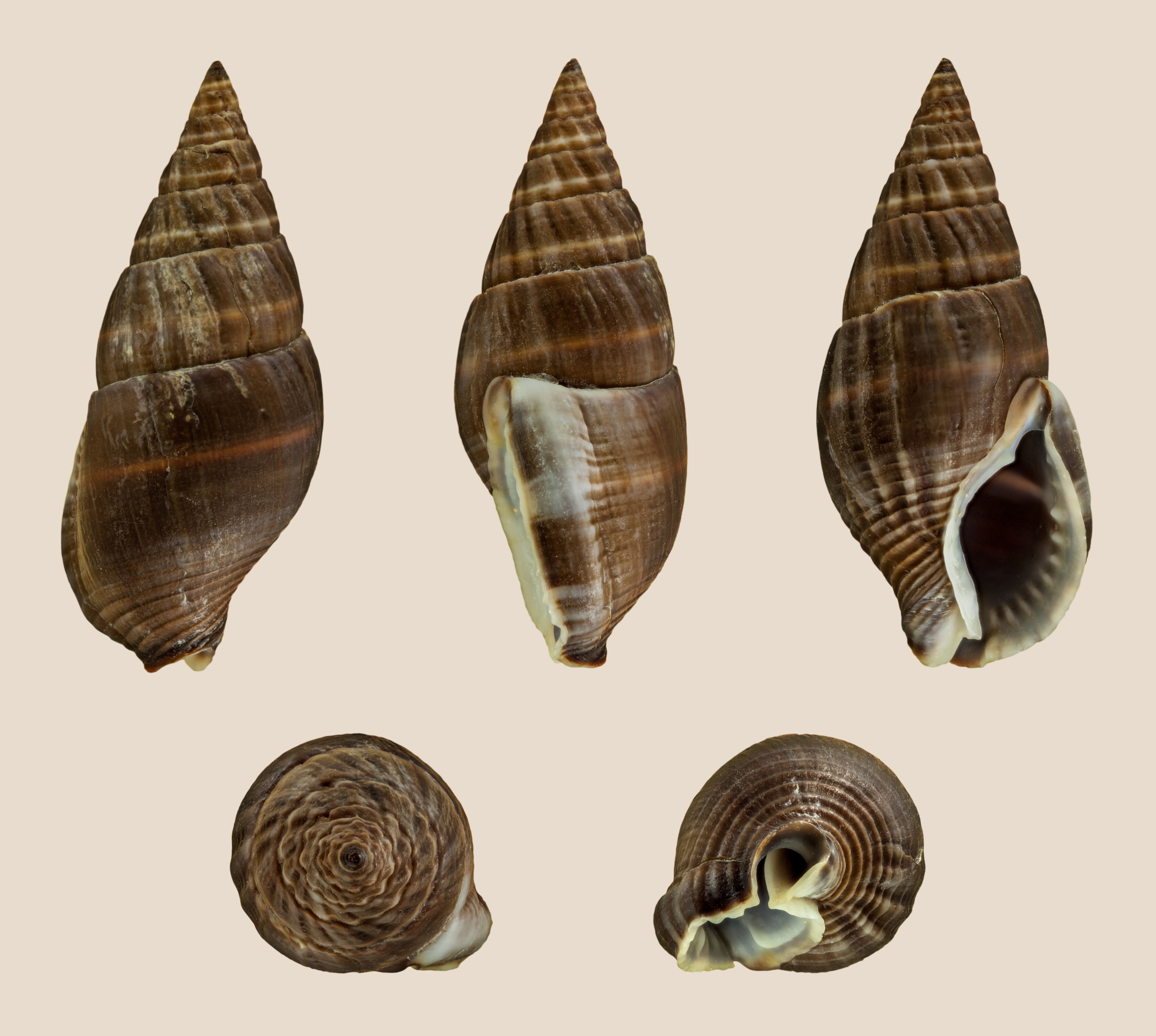
Nassarius (Zeuxis) olivaceus

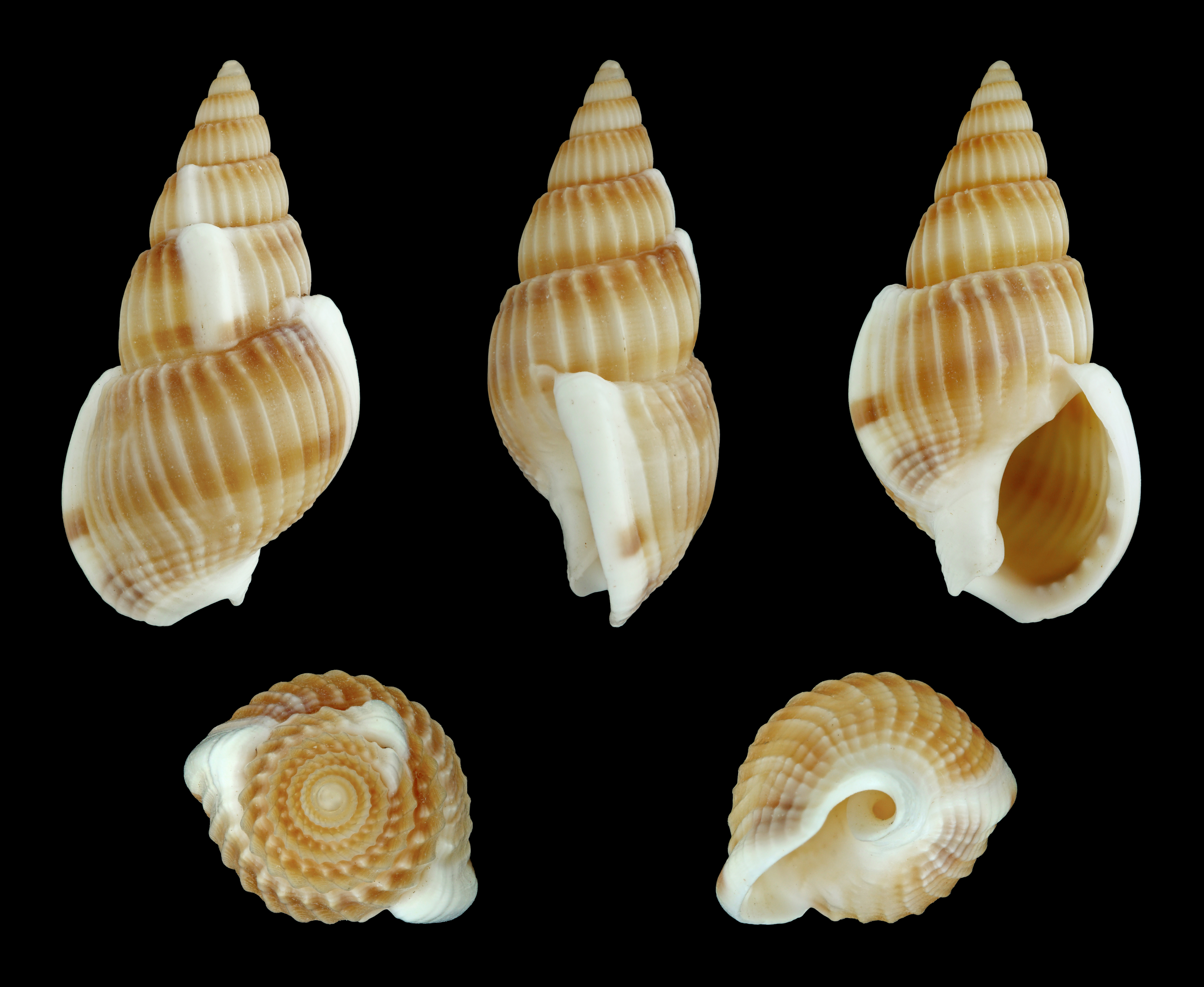
Nassarius (Zeuxis) variciferus

== Species ==
In the course of time, more than 1,000 names have been allocated to species in the genus Nassarius, most of which have become synonyms.

The following species are accepted names according to the World Register of Marine Species (WoRMS):

- Nassarius absconditus Gili, 2015
- Nassarius abyssicolus (A. Adams, 1852)
- Nassarius acteon MacNeil, 1960
- Nassarius acuminatus (Marrat, 1880)
- Nassarius acuticostus (Montrouzier in Souverbie & Montrouzier, 1864)
- Nassarius acutus (Say, 1822)
- † Nassarius adae (Boettger, 1902)
- Nassarius adami Arthur & Fernandes, 1989
- Nassarius agapetus (Watson, 1882)
- †Nassarius agatensis (Bellardi, 1882)
- Nassarius alabasteroides Kool, 2009
- Nassarius albescens (Dunker, 1846)
- Nassarius albinus (Thiele, 1930)
- Nassarius albomaculatus Rehder, 1980
- †Nassarius alfuricus (Fischer in Wanner, 1927)
- Nassarius algidus (Reeve, 1853)
- † Nassarius amycliformis (Shuto, 1969)
- Nassarius angolensis (Odhner, 1923)
- † Nassarius angulatus (Brocchi, 1814)
- Nassarius anguliferus (A. Adams, 1852)
- † Nassarius anomalus (Harmer, 1914)
- † Nassarius antiquus (Bellardi, 1882)
- Nassarius aoteanus Finlay, 1926
- Nassarius arcadioi Rolán & Hernández, 2005
- Nassarius arcularia (Linnaeus, 1758)
- Nassarius arcus Cernohorsky, 1991
- Nassarius arewarensis Nerurkar, Shimpi & Apte, 2020
- Nassarius argenteus (Marrat, 1877)
- † Nassarius asperulus (Brocchi, 1814)
- Nassarius atlantideus Adam & Knudsen, 1984
- † Nassarius attiguus (Bellardi, 1882)
- Nassarius babylonicus (Watson, 1882)
- † Nassarius badensis (Hörnes, 1852)
- Nassarius bailyi (Pilsbry & Lowe, 1932)
- † Nassarius banaticus (Boettger, 1902)
- † Nassarius bantamensis Oostingh, 1933
- † Nassarius barbarossai Landau, Harzhauser, İslamoğlu & Silva, 2013
- Nassarius barsdelli Ladd, 1976
- † Nassarius beberkirianus (K. Martin & Icke, 1906)
- Nassarius bellulus (A. Adams, 1852)
- Nassarius bellus (Marrat, 1877)
- Nassarius berniceae Willan & Beechey, 2015
- † Nassarius beureumensis Oostingh, 1933
- Nassarius bicallosus (E.A. Smith, 1876)
- Nassarius biendongensis Kool, 2003
- Nassarius bifarius W. Baird, 1873
- Nassarius bimaculosus (A. Adams, 1852)
- † Nassarius bolangoi (Ladd, 1976)
- † Nassarius bonellii (Sismonda, 1847)
- Nassarius boucheti Kool, 2004
- Nassarius bourbonensis Kool, 2015
- † Nassarius brebioni Van Dingenen, Ceulemans, Landau & C. M. Silva, 2015
- Nassarius brunneostomus (Stearns, 1893)
- Nassarius bruuni Adam & Knudsen, 1984
- Nassarius cadeei Kool, 2006
- Nassarius caelatus (A. Adams, 1852)
- Nassarius caelolineatus Nesbitt & Pitt, 1986
- Nassarius callospira (A. Adams, 1852)
- † Nassarius caloosaensis (Dall, 1890)
- Nassarius camelus (von Martens, 1897)
- Nassarius candei (d'Orbigny, 1847)
- Nassarius candens (Hinds, 1844)
- † Nassarius cantauranus Landau, 2010
- Nassarius capensis (Dunker, 1846)
- Nassarius capillaris (Watson, 1882)
- Nassarius castus (Gould, 1835)
- Nassarius catallus (Dall, 1908)
- † Nassarius cautleyi (d'Archiac & Haime)
- Nassarius celebensis (Schepman, 1907)
- † Nassarius cerithiformis (Hilber, 1879)
- Nassarius cernohorskyi Kool, 2005
- Nassarius cerritensis (Arnold, 1903)
- Nassarius chibi (Habe, 1960)
- † Nassarius chiereghinii (Bellardi, 1882)
- Nassarius cinctellus (Gould, 1850)
- Nassarius cinctellus (A. Adams, 1852) (invalid as a junior homonym, but temporarily retained)
- Nassarius cinnamomeus (A. Adams, 1852)
- Nassarius circumcinctus (Adams A., 1852)
- Nassarius clarus (Marrat, 1877)
- † Nassarius clathratus (Born, 1778)
- Nassarius collarius (C. B. Adams, 1852)
- † Nassarius coloratus (Eichwald, 1830)
- † Nassarius columbinus Van Dingenen, Ceulemans, Landau & C. M. Silva, 2015
- † Nassarius companyoi (Fontannes, 1879)
- Nassarius compertus Fernández-Garcés, Espinosa & Rolán, 1990
- Nassarius comptus (Marrat, 1880)
  - Nassarius comptus polita (Marrat, 1880)
- Nassarius concinnus (Powys, 1835)
- Nassarius congrua (Yokoyama, 1926)
- Nassarius conoidalis (Deshayes, 1832)
- Nassarius consensus (Ravenel, 1861) - striate nassa
- Nassarius coppingeri (E.A. Smith, 1881)
- Nassarius coriolis Kool, 2009
- Nassarius coronatus (Bruguière, 1789)
- Nassarius coronulus (A. Adams, 1852)
- † Nassarius corrugatus (Brocchi, 1814)
- † Nassarius crassigranosus (Tate, 1888)
- † Nassarius crassiusculus (Nyst, 1845)
- † Nassarius crebresulcatus (Bellardi, 1882)
- Nassarius crebricostatus (Schepman, 1911)
- Nassarius crematus (Hinds, 1844)
- Nassarius crenoliratus (A. Adams, 1852)
- Nassarius crenulatus (Lamarck, 1816) (nomen dubium)
- † Nassarius daciae (Hoernes & Auinger, 1882)
- Nassarius dakarensis (Fischer-Piette & Nicklès, 1946)
- Nassarius dekkeri Kool, 2001
- Nassarius delicatus (A. Adams, 1852)
- Nassarius delosi (Woodring, 1946)
- † Nassarius demissus (Yokoyama, 1923)
- † Nassarius denselineatus (Nagao, 1928)
- Nassarius dentifer (Powys, 1835)
- Nassarius deshayesianus (Issel, 1866)
- Nassarius deshayesii (Hombron & Jacquinot, 1848)
- Nassarius desmoulioides (G.B. Sowerby III, 1903)
- Nassarius dijki (K. Martin, 1895)
- Nassarius dilutus (E.A. Smith, 1899)
- Nassarius dimorphoides Oostingh, 1935
- Nassarius disparilis (E.A. Smith, 1903)
- Nassarius distortus (A. Adams, 1852)
- † Nassarius doliolum (Eichwald, 1830)
- Nassarius dorri Wattebled, 1886
- Nassarius dorsatus (Röding, 1798)
- Nassarius dorsuosus (A. Adams, 1852)
- † Nassarius dujardini (Deshayes, 1844)
- Nassarius echinatus (A. Adams, 1852)
- Nassarius ecstilbus (Melvill & Standen, 1896)
- † Nassarius edlaueri (Beer-Bistrický, 1958)
- † Nassarius eichwaldi (Friedberg, 1911)
- † Nassarius elabratus (Doderlein, 1862)
- Nassarius elegantissimus Shuto, 1969
- Nassarius emilyae Moolenbeek & Dekker, 1994
- † Nassarius eniwetokensis Ladd, 1977
- Nassarius enzoi Bozzetti, 2007
- † Nassarius erentoezae Landau, Harzhauser, İslamoğlu & Silva, 2013
- † Nassarius erunalae Landau, Harzhauser, İslamoğlu & Silva, 2013
- Nassarius euglyptus (G. B. Sowerby III, 1914)
- Nassarius eusulcatus (Sowerby, 1902)
- Nassarius excellens (Kuroda & Habe, 1961)
- Nassarius exilis (Powys, 1835)
- Nassarius eximius (H. Adams, 1872)
- Nassarius exsarcus (Dall, 1908)
- † Nassarius exspectatus (Bałuk, 1997)
- † Nassarius exstincteliratus (Fischer in Wanner, 1927)
- Nassarius exulatus (E.A. Smith, 1911)
- † Nassarius falconeri (d'Archiac & Haime, 1854)
- Nassarius fenistratus (Marratt, 1877)
- † Nassarius fennemai Oostingh, 1939
- Nassarius fenwicki Kilburn, 1972
- † Nassarius ficaratiensis (Monterosato, 1891)
- Nassarius fidus (Reeve, 1853)
- Nassarius filmerae (G.B. Sowerby III, 1900)
- Nassarius filosus (Reeve, 1853)
- Nassarius fissilabris (Adams, A., 1852)
- Nassarius formosus (Turton, 1932)
- Nassarius fossae (Preston, 1915)
- Nassarius fossatus (Gould, 1850) - channeled nassa
- Nassarius foveolatus (Dunker, 1847)
- Nassarius fraterculus (Dunker, 1860) - Japanese nassa
- Nassarius fraudator Cernohorsky, 1980
- Nassarius fraudulentus (Marrat, 1877)
- Nassarius frederici (Melvill & Standen, 1901)
- Nassarius fretorum (Melvill & Standen, 1899)
- † Nassarius fritzsteiningeri Harzhauser & Cernohorsky, 2011
- † Nassarius fuchsi (Koenen, 1872)
- Nassarius fufanus (Fischer in Wanner, 1927)
- Nassarius fuscescens (Dautzenberg, 1912)
- Nassarius fuscolineatus (E.A. Smith, 1875)
- Nassarius fuscus (Hombron & Jacquinot, 1848)
- Nassarius gallegosi Strong and Hertlein, 1937
- Nassarius garuda Kool, 2007
- Nassarius gaudiosus (Hinds, 1844)
  - Nassarius gaudiosus marrati E.A. Smith, 1876
  - Nassarius gaudiosus mucronata (A.. Adams, 1851)
- Nassarius gayii (Kiener, 1834)
- Nassarius gemmuliferus A. Adams, 1852
- Nassarius gemmulosus (C.B. Adams, 1852)
- † Nassarius gendryi Van Dingenen, Ceulemans, Landau & C. M. Silva, 2015
- † Nassarius gigantulus (Michelotti, 1840) †
- † Nassarius gilii Landau, Harzhauser, İslamoğlu & Silva, 2013
- Nassarius glabrus J.-L. Zhang & S.-P. Zhang, 2014
- Nassarius glagahensis Oostingh, 1935
- Nassarius glans (Linnaeus, 1758)
  - Nassarius glans particeps (Hedley, 1915)
- Nassarius globosus (Quoy & Gaimard, 1833)
- Nassarius goniopleura (Dall, 1908): taxon inquirendum
- † Nassarius grammatus (Dall, 1917)
- Nassarius granifer Kiener, 1834
- Nassarius granosocostatus (Schepman, 1911)
- Nassarius graphiterus (Hombron & Jacquinot, 1848)
- † Nassarius grateloupi (Hörnes, 1852)
- Nassarius gruneri (Dunker, 1846)
- Nassarius gruveli Adam & Knudsen, 1984
- Nassarius guaymasensis (Pilsbry & Lowe, 1932)
- Nassarius haldemanni (Dunker, 1847)
- Nassarius hansenae Kool, 1996
- Nassarius harpularia (Marrat, 1877)
- Nassarius harryleei García, 2001
- Nassarius helleri (Mari, 1929)
- † Nassarius hemipolitus Nomura & Zimbo, 1935
- Nassarius hepaticus (Pulteney, 1799)
- Nassarius herosae Kool, 2005
- Nassarius himeroessa (Melvill & Standen, 1903)
- Nassarius hiradoensis (Pilsbry, 1904)
- Nassarius hirasei Kuroda & Habe, 1952
- Nassarius hirtus (Kiener, 1834)
- † Nassarius hochstetteri (Hoernes & Auinger, 1882)
- Nassarius hongoensis Itoigawa, 1955
- Nassarius horridus (Dunker, 1847)
- Nassarius houbricki Kool & Galindo, 2014
- Nassarius howardae Chace, 1958
- Nassarius hugokooli Thach, 2016
- Nassarius humeratus J.-W. Yang & S.-P. Zhang, 2011
- † Nassarius hungaricus (Mayer, 1873)
- † Nassarius iberoclathratus Landau, C. M. Silva & Gili, 2009
- Nassarius idyllius (Melvill & Standen, 1901)
- Nassarius ikedai Thach, 2017
- † Nassarius illovensis (Hoernes & Auinger, 1882)
- † Nassarius incognitus (Peyrot, 1925)
- Nassarius incongruus Otuka, 1937
- † Nassarius infralaevis (Fischer in Wanner, 1927)
- Nassarius insculptus (Carpenter, 1864) - smooth western nassa
- Nassarius interliratus (E. A. Smith, 1876)
- † Nassarius intersulcatus (Hilber, 1879)
- Nassarius iodes (Dall, 1917)
- Nassarius irus (Martens, 1880)
- Nassarius ischnus (Melvill, 1899)
- Nassarius jacksonianus (Quoy & Gaimard, 1833)
- Nassarius jactabundus (Melvill, 1906)
- † Nassarius janschloegli Harzhauser, 2011
- † Nassarius jansseni Harzhauser & Kowalke, 2004
- Nassarius javanus (Schepman, 1891)
- Nassarius jonasii (Dunker, 1846)
- † Nassarius junghuhni (K. Martin, 1895)
- Nassarius kaicherae Jong & Coomans, 1988
- Nassarius keenii (Marrat, 1877)
- Nassarius kiiensis Kira, 1954
- Nassarius kilburni Kool, 2019
- Nassarius kochianus (Dunker, 1846)
- Nassarius kometubus Otuka, 1934
- † Nassarius kondangensis (Oostingh, 1939)
- Nassarius kooli Dekker & Dekkers, 2009
- Nassarius kraussianus (Dunker, 1846)
- Nassarius kruizingai Oostingh, 1939
- Nassarius labiatus (A. Adams, 1853)
- † Nassarius labiosus (J. de C. Sowerby, 1824)
- Nassarius labordei (Giner Mari, 1929)
- † Nassarius landreauensis Van Dingenen, Ceulemans, Landau & C. M. Silva, 2015
- † Nassarius lapugyensis (Hoernes & Auinger, 1882)
- † Nassarius larandicus Landau, Harzhauser, İslamoğlu & Silva, 2013
- Nassarius lavanonoensis Bozzetti, 2006
- Nassarius lawsonorum Kilburn, 2000
- Nassarius leptospira (A. Adams, 1852)
- Nassarius levis Abbate & Cavallari, 2013
- Nassarius liberiensis (Knudsen, 1956)
- † Nassarius ligusticus (Bellardi, 1882)
- Nassarius limacinus (Dall, 1917)
- Nassarius limnaeformis (Dunker, 1847)
- Nassarius livescens (Philippi, 1848)
- Nassarius lochi Kool, 1996
- Nassarius luctuosus (A. Adams, 1852)
- Nassarius luridus (Gould, 1850)
- Nassarius maccauslandi Cernohorsky, 1984
- Nassarius macrocephalus (Schepman, 1911)
- † Nassarius macrodon (Bronn, 1831)
- † Nassarius madiunensis (K. Martin, 1895)
- Nassarius madurensis Kool, 2013
- Nassarius mammilliferus (Melvill, 1897)
- † Nassarius mandirensis Oostingh, 1939
- † Nassarius mangkalihatensis Beets, 1941
- Nassarius margaritifer (Dunker, 1847)
- Nassarius marmoreus (A. Adams, 1852)
- Nassarius marratii (E. A. Smith, 1876)
- † Nassarius martae Van Dingenen, Ceulemans, Landau & C. M. Silva, 2015
- † Nassarius martinelli Gili, 1992
- Nassarius martinezi Kool & Galindo, 2014
- Nassarius massemini Kool, 2020
- Nassarius maxuitongi S.-Q. Zhang, S.-P. Zhang & H.-T. Li, 2019
- Nassarius megalocallus Adam & Knudsen, 1984
- † Nassarius megastoma (Bellardi, 1882)
- Nassarius mekranicus (Vredenburg, 1925)
- Nassarius mendicus (Gould, 1850) - lean western nassa
- † Nassarius merlei Van Dingenen, Ceulemans, Landau & C. M. Silva, 2015
- Nassarius micans (A. Adams, 1852)
- Nassarius mirabilis Bozzetti, 2007
- Nassarius miser (Dall, 1908)
- Nassarius mobilis (Hedley & May, 1908)
- Nassarius moestus (Hinds, 1844)
- Nassarius moolenbeeki Kool, 1995
- Nassarius muelleri (Maltzan, 1884)
- Nassarius multicostatus (A. Adams, 1852)
- Nassarius multigranosus (Dunker, 1847)
- Nassarius multipunctatus (Schepman, 1911)
- Nassarius multivocus Kool, 2008
- Nassarius mundus (Sturany, 1900)
- Nassarius mustelina (Gould, 1860)
- Nassarius myristicatus (Hinds, 1844)
- Nassarius nakayamai (Habe, 1958)
- Nassarius nanhaiensis Zhang, 2013
- Nassarius natalensis (E.A. Smith, 1903)
- † Nassarius neugeboreni (Hoernes & Auinger, 1882)
- Nassarius ngawianus (K. Martin, 1895)
- Nassarius ngocthachi Cossignani, 2021
- Nassarius nigellus (Reeve, 1854)
- Nassarius niger (Hombron & Jacquinot, 1848)
- Nassarius nigrolabrus (Verrill, 1880) (nomen dubium)
- Nassarius niveus (A. Adams, 1852)
- Nassarius nobilis (Thiele, 1925)
- Nassarius nodicinctus (A. Adams, 1852)
- Nassarius nodicostatus (A. Adams, 1852)
- Nassarius nodiferus (Powys, 1835)
- Nassarius nodulosus (Marrat, 1873)
- Nassarius noguchii (Habe, 1958)
- Nassarius notoensis Masuda, 1956
- † Nassarius notterbecki (Hoernes & Auinger, 1882)
- Nassarius novaezelandiae (Reeve, 1854)
- Nassarius nuceus (Pease, 1869)
- Nassarius nucleolus (Philippi, 1846)
- † Nassarius nuttalli (Ludbrook, 1978)
- Nassarius oberwimmeri (Preston, 1907)
- Nassarius obesus (G. & H. Nevill, 1875)
- Nassarius oblongus (Marrat, 1877)
- Nassarius obvelatus (Deshayes, 1833)
- Nassarius ocellatus Kool & Galindo, 2014
- Nassarius ofeliae Cossignani, 2021
- Nassarius olivaceus (Bruguière, 1789)
- Nassarius olomea Kay, 1979
- † Nassarius omuensis (H. Noda, 1980)
- Nassarius onchodes (Dall, 1917)
- Nassarius oneratus (Deshayes, 1863)
- Nassarius optimus (G.B. Sowerby III, 1903)
- Nassarius orissaensis (Preston, 1914)
- † Nassarius ovum K. Martin, 1880
- † Nassarius pacaudi Van Dingenen, Ceulemans, Landau & C. M. Silva, 2015
- Nassarius pachychilus (von Maltzan, 1884)
- † Nassarius palumbis Van Dingenen, Ceulemans, Landau & C. M. Silva, 2015
- Nassarius paolomeli T. Cossignani, 2018
- Nassarius papillosus (Linnaeus, 1758)
- Nassarius parcipictus Adam & Knudsen, 1984
- † Nassarius pascaleae Landau, Harzhauser, İslamoğlu & Silva, 2013
- † Nassarius patnuttalli Landau, C. M. Silva & Gili, 2009
- Nassarius patricius (Thiele, 1925)
- Nassarius paucicostatus (Marrat, 1877)
- † Nassarius pauli (Hoernes, 1875)
- Nassarius pauperatus (Lamarck, 1822)
- † Nassarius perdominulus Nomura & Zimbo, 1935
- Nassarius pernitidus (Dall, 1889)
- Nassarius persicus (von Martens, 1874)
- Nassarius pictus (Dunker, 1846)
- † Nassarius plainei Van Dingenen, Ceulemans, Landau & C. M. Silva, 2015
- Nassarius plebejus (Thiele, 1925)
- † Nassarius podolicus (Hoernes & Auinger, 1882)
- † Nassarius poelsensis (Hilber, 1879)
- Nassarius polistes (Dall, 1917)
- † Nassarius pontisnovi Cox, 1936
- Nassarius poppei Thach, 2018
- † Nassarius poteriensis Van Dingenen, Ceulemans, Landau & C. M. Silva, 2015
- Nassarius poupini Cernohorsky, 1992
- † Nassarius praeambiguus (Brown & Pilsbry, 1913)
- Nassarius praematuratus Kuroda & Habe, 1852
- Nassarius prianganensis Altena & Beets, 1945
- Nassarius protrusidens (Melvill, 1918)
- Nassarius provulgatus (P. Fischer, 1891)
- † Nassarius prysmaticus (Brocchi, 1814)
- Nassarius pseudoconcinnus (E.A. Smith, 1895)
- † Nassarius pseudodemissus Nomura & Zimbo, 1935
- † Nassarius pseudoovum Harzhauser, Raven & Landau, 2018
- Nassarius pseudopoecilostictus Adam & Knudsen, 1984
- † Nassarius pseudoserratus Adam & Glibert, 1976
- † Nassarius pseudoserrulus Landau, Harzhauser, İslamoğlu & Silva, 2013
- Nassarius psila (Watson, 1882)
- Nassarius pullus (Linnaeus, 1758)
- Nassarius pulvinaris (von Martens, 1881)
- Nassarius pumilio (E.A. Smith, 1872)
- Nassarius punctatus (A. Adams, 1852)
- † Nassarius pupaeformis (Hoernes & Auinger, 1882)
- Nassarius pupinoides (Reeve, 1853)
- Nassarius pyramidalis A. Adams, 1853
- † Nassarius pyrenaicus (Fontannes, 1879)
- Nassarius pyrrhus (Menke, 1843)
- Nassarius quadrasi (Hidalgo, 1904)
- Nassarius quantulus (Gould, 1860)
- Nassarius quercinus (Marrat, 1880)
- Nassarius radians Kool & Galindo, 2014
- Nassarius rainbowae Gili, 2015
- † Nassarius rectus (Dollfus & Dautzenberg, 1886)
- † Nassarius reductus Vermeij & Wesselingh, 2002
- Nassarius reeveanus (Dunker, 1847)
- Nassarius rehderi Cernohorsky, 1980
- † Nassarius reticosus (J. Sowerby, 1815)
- Nassarius reunionensis Cernohorsky, 1988
- † Nassarius reussi (K. Martin, 1880)
- Nassarius rhinetes S.S. Berry, 1953 - California nassa
- Nassarius richeri Cernohorsky, 1992
- Nassarius roissyi (Deshayes in Belanger, 1832)
- Nassarius roseae T. Cossignani, 2017
- † Nassarius rubusindicus Oostingh, 1939
- Nassarius rufus (Dunker, 1847)
- † Nassarius salbriacensis (Peyrot, 1925)
- Nassarius samiae Kool, 2006
- Nassarius sanctaehelenae (A. Adams, 1852)
- Nassarius scabriusculus (Powys, 1835)
- Nassarius scalaris (A. Adams, 1852)
- † Nassarius schroeckingeri (Hoernes & Auinger, 1882)
- † Nassarius schultzi Harzhauser & Kowalke, 2004
- Nassarius scissuratus (Dall, 1889) - carved nassa
- Nassarius seclusus (P. Fischer, 1891)
- † Nassarius semistriatus (Brocchi, 1814)
- Nassarius semisulcatus (Rousseau, 1854)
- † Nassarius separabilis Laws, 1939
- Nassarius sesarmus (Marrat, 1877)
- Nassarius shacklefordi (Melvill & Standen, 1896)
- Nassarius shaskyi Mclean, 1970
- † Nassarius signatodentis Harzhauser & Cernohorsky, 2011
- Nassarius signatus (Dunker, 1847)
- Nassarius simizui Otuka, 1934
- Nassarius sinarum (Philippi, 1851)
- Nassarius sinusigerus (A. Adams, 1852)
- Nassarius siquijorensis (A. Adams, 1852)
- Nassarius smithii (Marrat, 1877)
- † Nassarius socialis (Hutton, 1886)
- † Nassarius solidus (Bell, 1898)
- Nassarius sordidus (A. Adams, 1852)
- Nassarius speciosus (Adams, A., 1852)
- † Nassarius spectabilis (Nyst, 1843)
- † Nassarius sperlingensis Adam & Glibert, 1976
- Nassarius spiraliscabrus (Chapman & Gabriel, 1914)
- Nassarius spiratus (A. Adams, 1852)
- Nassarius splendidulus (Dunker, 1846)
- Nassarius stigmarius (A. Adams, 1852)
- Nassarius stimpsonianus (C.B. Adams, 1852)
- Nassarius stolatus (Gmelin, 1791)
- † Nassarius striatulus (Eichwald, 1829)
- Nassarius striatus (C.B. Adams, 1852)
- Nassarius strongae Thach, 2018
- † Nassarius sturi (Hoernes & Auinger, 1882)
- † Nassarius styriacus (Hilber, 1879)
- † Nassarius subasperatus (Boettger, 1906)
- Nassarius subbalteatus MacNeil, 1961
- Nassarius subconstrictus (Sowerby, 1899)
- Nassarius subcopiosus (Ludbrook, 1958)
- Nassarius sublirellus (Tate, 1888)
- † Nassarius subprismaticus (Hoernes & Auinger, 1882)
- Nassarius subspinosus Lamarck
- Nassarius subtranslucidus (Smith, 1903)
- Nassarius succinctus (A. Adams, 1852)
- Nassarius sufflatus (Gould, 1860)
- Nassarius sumatranus (Thiele, 1925)
- † Nassarius sundaicus Oostingh, 1939
- † Nassarius supernecostatus (Hoernes & Auinger, 1882)
- Nassarius swearingeni Petuch & R. F. Myers, 2014
- Nassarius tabescens (Marrat, 1880)
- Nassarius tadjallii Moolenbeek, 2007
- Nassarius taeniolatus (Philippi, 1845)
- † Nassarius talahabensis (K. Martin, 1921)
- † Nassarius tambacanus (K. Martin, 1884)
- Nassarius tangaroai Kool, 2006
- Nassarius tango Scarabino, 2004
- † Nassarius tatei (Tenison Woods, 1879)
- Nassarius tateyamensis Kuroda, 1929
- † Nassarius taurinospeciosus Harzhauser & Cernohorsky, 2011
- Nassarius teretiusculus (A. Adams, 1852)
- Nassarius thachi Dekker, 2004
- Nassarius thachorum Dekker, Kool & van Gemert, 2016
- Nassarius thaumasius (Sturany, 1900)
- † Nassarius toulai (Hilber, 1879)
- Nassarius townsendi (Dall, 1880)
- Nassarius trinodosus (E. A. Smith, 1876)
- Nassarius tritoniformis (Kiener, 1841)
- Nassarius troendleorum Cernohorsky, 1980
- † Nassarius tunetoyensis Nomura & Hatai, 1936
- Nassarius turbineus (Gould, 1845)
- † Nassarius turgens (Bellardi, 1882)
- † Nassarius turonensis (Deshayes, 1844)
- † Nassarius turpis Van Dingenen, Ceulemans, Landau & C. M. Silva, 2015
- Nassarius uhlae T. Cossignani, 2024
- † Nassarius vandervlerki Oostingh, 1939
- † Nassarius vanesi Oostingh, 1935
- Nassarius vanessae Bozzetti, 2014
- Nassarius vangemerti Moolenbeek, 2010
- Nassarius vanpeli Kool, 2005
- Nassarius vanuatuensis Kool & Galindo, 2014
- Nassarius variciferus (A. Adams, 1852)
- † Nassarius varicosecostatus (Fischer in Wanner, 1927)
- Nassarius velatus (Gould, 1850)
- Nassarius velvetosus Kool & Galindo, 2014
- † Nassarius venemai (Koperberg, 1931)
- Nassarius venustus (Dunker, 1847)
- Nassarius vidalensis (Barnard, 1959)
- Nassarius vinctus (Marrat, 1877)
- Nassarius vitiensis (Hombron & Jacquinot, 1848)
- Nassarius vittatus (A. Adams, 1853)
- † Nassarius volhynicus (Andrzejowski, 1830)
- † Nassarius vulgatissimus (Mayer, 1860)
- Nassarius webbei (Petit, 1850)
- Nassarius websteri Petuch & Sargent, 2012
- Nassarius whiteheadae Cernohorsky, 1984
- Nassarius wilsoni (C.B. Adams, 1852)
- Nassarius wolffi Knudsen
- † Nassarius zborzewskii (Andrzejowski, 1830)

== Synonyms ==
- Nassarius angulicostis (Pilsbry and Lowe, 1932): synonym of Nassarius nodicinctus (A. Adams, 1852)
- Nassarius antillarum (d'Orbigny, 1847) - Antilles nassa: synonym of Phrontis antillara (d'Orbigny, 1847)
- Nassarius antiquatus (Watson, 1897): synonym of Nassarius recidivus (Martens, 1876)
- Nassarius balteatus (Pease, 1869): synonym of Reticunassa balteata (Pease, 1869)
- Nassarius brychius (Watson, 1822): synonym of Nassarius frigens (E. von Martens, 1878): synonym of Tritia frigens (E. von Martens, 1878)
- Nassarius burchardi (Dunker in Philippi, 1849): synonym of Tritia burchardi (Philippi, 1849)
- Nassarius caboverdensis (Rolán, 1984): synonym of Tritia caboverdensis (Rolán, 1984)
- † Nassarius cabrierensis (Fontannes, 1878): synonym of † Nassarius striatulus (Eichwald, 1829)
- Nassarius candidissimus (C. B. Adams, 1845): synonym of Phrontis candidissima (C. B. Adams, 1845)
- Nassarius cockburnensis Kool & Dekker, 2006: synonym of Reticunassa cockburnensis (Kool & Dekker, 2006) (original combination)
- Nassarius compactus (Angas, 1865): synonym of Reticunassa compacta (Angas, 1865)
- Nassarius complanatus (Powys, 1835): synonym of Phrontis complanata (Powys, 1835)
- Nassarius conspersus (Philippi, 1848): synonym of Tritia conspersa (Philippi, 1849)
- Nassarius coralligenus (Pallary, 1900): synonym of Tritia coralligena (Pallary, 1900)
- Nassarius corniculum (Olivi, 1792): synonym of Tritia corniculum (Olivi, 1792)
- Nassarius corpulentus (C.B. Adams, 1852): synonym of Nassarius nassiformis (Lesson, 1842): synonym of Phrontis nassiformis (Lesson, 1842)
- Nassarius costellifera A. Adams: synonym of Nassarius margaritifer (Dunker, 1847)
- Nassarius crenulicostatus (Shuto, 1969): synonym of Reticunassa crenulicostata (Shuto, 1969)
- Nassarius crossei (Maltzan, 1884): synonym of Nassarius dakarensis (Fischer-Piette & Nicklès, 1946)
- Nassarius cussottii Bozzetti, 2006: synonym of Nassarius irus (Martens, 1880)
- Nassarius cuvierii (Payraudeau, 1826): synonym of Tritia cuvierii (Payraudeau, 1826)
- Nassarius denticulatus (A. Adams, 1852): synonym of Tritia denticulata (A. Adams, 1852)
- Nassarius elegans Kiener, 1834: synonym of Nassarius crassiusculus (Nyst, 1845)
- Nassarius elatus (Gould, 1845): synonym of Tritia elata (Gould, 1845)
- Nassarius ephamillus (Watson, 1882): synonym of Tritia ephamilla (Watson, 1882)
- Nassarius erythraeus (Issel, 1869): synonym of Reticunassa erythraea (Issel, 1869)
- Nassarius festivus (Powys, 1835): synonym of Reticunassa festiva (Powys, 1835)
- Nassarius fischeri Dautzenberg: synonym of Nassarius fuscescens (Dautzenberg, 1912)
- Nassarius frigens (Martens, 1878): synonym of Tritia frigens (Martens, 1878)
- Nassarius gemmulatus (Lamarck, 1822): synonym of Nassarius conoidalis (Deshayes in Belanger, 1832)
- Nassarius gibbosulus (Linnaeus, 1758): synonym of Tritia gibbosula (Linnaeus, 1758)
- Nassarius glabratus (G.B. Sowerby II, 1842): synonym of Naytia glabrata (G. B. Sowerby II, 1842)
- Nassarius goreensis (Von Maltzan, 1884): synonym of Tritia goreensis (Maltzan, 1884)
- Nassarius graniferus Kiener, 1834: synonym of Nassarius granifer Kiener, 1834
- Nassarius granuliferus (Kiener, 1834): synonym of Nassarius granifer Kiener, 1834
- Nassarius granum (Lamarck, 1822): synonym of Tritia grana (Lamarck, 1822)
- Nassarius hanraveni Kool & Dekker, 2006: synonym of Reticunassa hanraveni (Kool & Dekker, 2006)
- Nassarius heynemanni (Von Maltzan, 1884): synonym of Tritia heynemanni (Maltzan, 1884)
- Nassarius hotessieri (d'Orbigny, 1843): synonym of Phrontis hotessieriana (d'Orbigny, 1842)
- Nassarius hotessierianus (d'Orbigny, 1842) - miniature nassa: synonym of Phrontis hotessieriana (d'Orbigny, 1842)
- Nassarius incrassatus (Stroem, 1768): synonym of Tritia incrassata (Strøm, 1768)
- Nassarius insignis (H. Adams, 1867): synonym of Nassodonta insignis H. Adams, 1867
- Nassarius jeanmartini Kool & Dekker, 2006: synonym of Reticunassa jeanmartini (Kool & Dekker, 2006)
- Nassarius johni (Monterosato, 1889): synonym of Naytia johni (Monterosato, 1889)
- Nassarius karinae (Usticke, 1971): synonym of Phrontis karinae (Nowell-Usticke, 1971)
- Nassarius kieneri (Deshayes, 1863): synonym of Nassarius bourbonensis Kool, 2015
- Nassarius lima (Dillwyn, 1817): synonym of Tritia lima (Dillwyn, 1817)
- Nassarius louisi (Pallary, 1912): synonym of Tritia louisi (Pallary, 1912)
- Nassarius luteostoma (Broderip & Sowerby, 1829): synonym of Phrontis luteostoma (Broderip & G. B. Sowerby I, 1829)
- Nassarius margaritifera (Dunker, 1847): synonym of Nassarius margaritifer
- Nassarius margaritiferus (Dunker, 1847à): synonym of Nassarius margaritifer
- Nassarius melanioides (Reeve, 1853): synonym of Nassarius fuscus (Hombron & Jacquinot, 1848)
- Nassarius miga (Bruguière, 1789): synonym of Tritia miga (Bruguière, 1789)
- Nassarius monilis (Kiener, 1834): synonym of Nassarius distortus (A. Adams, 1852)
- Nassarius mucronata: synonym of Nassarius gaudiosus (Hinds, 1844)
- Nassarius mutabilis (Linnaeus, 1758): synonym of Tritia mutabilis (Linnaeus, 1758)
- Nassarius nanus Nowell-Usticke, G.W., 1959: synonym of Nassarius karinae Nowell-Usticke, G.W., 1971, synonym of Phrontis karinae (Nowell-Usticke, 1971)
- Nassarius nigrolabra (Verrill, 1880): synonym of Nassarius nigrolabrus (Verrill, 1880)
- Nassarius nitidus (Jeffreys, 1867): synonym of Tritia nitida (Jeffreys, 1867)
- Nassarius nodifer (Powys, 1835): synonym of Nassarius nodiferus (Powys, 1835)
- Nassarius obliquus Kiener: synonym of Nassarius glabratus (G.B. Sowerby II, 1842), synonym of Naytia glabrata (G. B. Sowerby II, 1842)
- Nassarius obsoletus (Say, 1822) - eastern mudsnail: synonym of Ilyanassa obsoleta (Say, 1822): synonym of Tritia obsoleta (Say, 1822)
- Nassarius ovoideus (Locard, 1886): synonym of Tritia ovoidea (Locard, 1886)
- Nassarius pagodus (Reeve, 1844): synonym of Phrontis pagoda (Reeve, 1844)
- Nassarius pauperus (Gould, 1850): synonym of Reticunassa paupera (Gould, 1850)
- Nassarius perpinguis (Hinds, 1844) - fat western nassa: synonym of Caesia perpinguis (Hinds, 1844)
- Nassarius pfeifferi (Philippi, 1844): synonym of Tritia pfeifferi (Philippi, 1844)
- Nassarius plicatellus Adams: synonym of Nassarius niveus (A. Adams, 1852)
- Nassarius polygonatus (Lamarck, 1822): synonym of Phrontis polygonata (Lamarck, 1822)
- Nassarius priscardi Bozzetti, 2006: synonym of Naytia priscardi (Bozzetti, 2006)
- Nassarius pygmaeus Lamarck, 1822: synonym of Tritia pygmaea (Lamarck, 1822)
- Nassarius recidivus (Martens, 1876): synonym of Tritia recidiva (von Martens, 1876)
- † Nassarius ridibundus Lozouet, 1999: synonym of † Tritia ridibunda (Lozouet, 1999)
- Nassarius robustus (Monterosato, 1890): synonym of Tritia lima (Dillwyn, 1817)
- Nassarius rotundus (Melvill & Standen, 1896): synonym of Reticunassa rotunda (Melvill & Standen, 1896)
- Nassarius semiplicatoides Zhang, Ai-Ju, You, Zhong-Jie, 2007: synonym of Nassarius foveolatus (Dunker, 1847)
- Nassarius sertulus (A. Adams, 1852 in 1852–53): synonym of Nassarius haldemani (Dunker, 1847)
- † Nassarius signatus (Hörnes, 1852): synonym of † Nassarius signatodentis Harzhauser & Cernohorsky, 2011
- Nassarius silvardi Kool & Dekker, 2006: synonym of Reticunassa silvardi (Kool & Dekker, 2006)
- Nassarius simoni Kool & Dekker, 2007: synonym of Reticunassa simoni (Kool & Dekker, 2007)
- Nassarius simplex (E.A. Smith, 1880): synonym of Nassarius tango F. Scarabino, 2004
- Nassarius skoogi (Odhner, 1923): synonym of Adinassa skoogi (Odhner, 1923)
- Nassarius smitsorum Kool, 1990: synonym of Nassarius quercinus (Marrat, 1880)
- † Nassarius subincognitus Lozouet, 1999: synonym of † Tritia subincognita (Lozouet, 1999)
- Nassarius suturalis(Lamarck, 1822): synonym of Nassarius glans (Linnaeus, 1758)
- Nassarius taenius (Gmelin, 1790): synonym of Nassarius olivaceus (Bruguière, 1789)
- Nassarius tiarula (Kiener, 1841) - western mud nassa: synonym of Phrontis tiarula (Kiener, 1841)
- Nassarius tinei (Maravigna in Guérin, 1840): synonym of Tritia tinei (Maravigna, 1840)
- Nassarius tingitanus (Pallary, 1901): synonym of Tritia tingitana (Pallary, 1901)
- Nassarius trifasciatus Adams: synonym of Nassarius vinctus (Marrat, 1877)
- Nassarius trivittatus (Say, 1822) - threeline mudsnail: synonym of Tritia trivittata (Say, 1822), synonym of Ilyanassa trivittata (Say, 1822)
- Nassarius turulosus (Risso, 1826): synonym of Tritia turulosa (Risso, 1826)
- Nassarius unicolor Kiener, L.C., 1834: synonym of Nassarius dorsatus (Röding, 1798)
- Nassarius unifasciatus (Kiener, 1834): synonym of Tritia unifasciata (Kiener, 1834)
- Nassarius versicolor (C. B. Adams, 1852): synonym of Phrontis versicolor (C. B. Adams, 1852)
- Nassarius vibex (Say, 1822) - bruised nassa: synonym of Phrontis vibex (Say, 1822)
- Nassarius weyersi Craven: synonym of Nassarius pumilio (E.A. Smith, 1872)
- Nassarius vaucheri (Pallary, 1906): synonym of Tritia vaucheri (Pallary, 1906)
- Nassarius zanzibarensis Kool & Dekker, 2007: synonym of Reticunassa zanzibarensis (Kool & Dekker, 2007)
- Nassarius zonalis (A. Adams, 1852): synonym of Nassarius reeveanus (Dunker, 1847)

== Synonymized subgenera ==
- Nassarius (Aciculina) Adams, 1853 (alternate representation of Nassarius Duméril, 1805
- Nassarius (Alectryon) Berthold in Latreille, 1827: synonym of Nassarius (Alectrion) Montfort, 1810 (alternate representation of Nassarius Duméril, 1805)
- Nassarius (Allanassa) Iredale, 1929: synonym of Nassarius Duméril, 1805
- Nassarius (Amycla) H. Adams & A. Adams, 1853: synonym of Nassarius (Gussonea) Monterosato, 1912
- Nassarius (Amyclina) Iredale, 1918: synonym of Nassarius (Gussonea) Monterosato, 1912
- Nassarius (Arcularia) Link, 1807: alternate representation of Nassarius Duméril, 1805
  - Nassarius (Arcularia) glabratus (Sowerby, 1842): synonym of Nassarius glabratus (Sowerby, 1842)
- Nassarius (Austronassaria) C. Laseron & J. Laseron, 1956: synonym of Nassarius (Plicarcularia) Thiele, 1929 (alternate representation of Nassarius Duméril, 1805)
- Nassarius (Bathynassa) Ladd, 1976: synonym of Nassarius (Zeuxis) H. Adams & A. Adams, 1853 (alternate representation of Nassarius Duméril, 1805)
- Nassarius (Caesia) H. Adams & A. Adams, 1853: alternate representation of Nassarius Duméril, 1805
- Nassarius (Cencus) Gistel, 1848: synonym of Nassarius (Cyclope) Risso, 1826 (alternate representation of Nassarius Duméril, 1805)
- Nassarius (Chelenassa) Shuto, 1969: synonym of Nassarius (Plicarcularia) Thiele, 1929 (alternate representation of Nassarius Duméril, 1805)
- Nassarius (Cryptonassarius) Watson, R.B., 1882: alternate representation of Nassarius Duméril, 1805
- Nassarius (Cyclocyrtia) Agassiz, 1848: synonym of Nassarius (Cyclope) Risso, 1826 (alternate representation of Nassarius Duméril, 1805)
- Nassarius (Cyclonassa) Swainson, 1840: synonym of Nassarius (Cyclope) Risso, 1826 (alternate representation of Nassarius Duméril, 1805)
- Nassarius (Cyclope) Risso, 1826: alternate representation of Nassarius Duméril, 1805
- Nassarius (Cyclops) Montfort, 1810: synonym of Nassarius (Cyclope) Risso, 1826 (alternate representation of Nassarius Duméril, 1805)
- Nassarius (Demondia) Addicott, 1956: synonym of Nassarius (Caesia) H. Adams & A. Adams, 1853 (alternate representation of Nassarius Duméril, 1805)
- Nassarius (Eione) Risso, 1826: synonym of Nassarius (Plicarcularia) Thiele, 1929 (alternate representation of Nassarius Duméril, 1805)
- Nassarius (Fackia) Nordsieck, 1972: synonym of Nassarius (Gussonea) Monterosato, 1912
- Nassarius (Glabrinassa) Shuto, 1969: synonym of Nassarius (Zeuxis) H. Adams & A. Adams, 1853 (alternate representation of Nassarius Duméril, 1805)
- Nassarius (Gussonea) Monterosato, 1912: synonym of Nassarius Duméril, 1805
- Nassarius (Hannonia) Pallary, 1914: synonym of Nassarius (Aciculina) Adams, 1853 (alternate representation of Nassarius Duméril, 1805)
- Nassarius (Hima) Gray, 1852 ex Leach, ms.: alternate representation of Nassarius Duméril, 1805
- Nassarius (Hinia) Gray, 1847: alternate representation of Nassarius Duméril, 1805
- Nassarius (Miohinia) Nordsieck, 1972: synonym of Nassarius (Hinia) Gray, 1847 (alternate representation of Nassarius Duméril, 1805)
- Nassarius (Mirua) Marwick, 1931: synonym of Nassarius (Hima) Gray, 1852 ex Leach, ms. (alternate representation of Nassarius Duméril, 1805)
- Nassarius (Nana) Schumacher, 1817: synonym of Nassarius (Cyclope) Risso, 1826 (alternate representation of Nassarius Duméril, 1805)
- Nassarius (Nanina) Risso, 1826: synonym of Nassarius (Cyclope) Risso, 1826 (alternate representation of Nassarius Duméril, 1805)
- Nassarius (Nanarius) Woodring, 1964: alternate representation of Nassarius Duméril, 1805
- Nassarius (Nannia) Philippi, 1844: synonym of Nassarius (Cyclope) Risso, 1826 (alternate representation of Nassarius Duméril, 1805)
- Nassarius (Nasseburna) de Gregorio, 1890: synonym of Nassarius (Sphaeronassa) Locard, 1886 (alternate representation of Nassarius Duméril, 1805)
- Nassarius (Nassodonta) H. Adams, 1867: alternate representation of Nassarius Duméril, 1805
- Nassarius (Nassarius) Duméril, 1805: alternate representation of Nassarius Duméril, 1805
- Nassarius (Naytia) H. Adams & A. Adams 1853: alternate representation of Nassarius Duméril, 1805
- Nassarius (Naytiopsis) Thiele, 1929: alternate representation of Nassarius Duméril, 1805
- Nassarius (Neritula) Herrmannsen, 1852: synonym of Nassarius (Cyclope) Risso, 1826 (alternate representation of Nassarius Duméril, 1805)
- Nassarius (Niotha) H. Adams & A. Adams, 1853: alternate representation of Nassarius Duméril, 1805
- Nassarius (Pallacera) Woodring, 1964: alternate representation of Nassarius Duméril, 1805
- Nassarius (Phrontis) H. Adams & A. Adams, 1853: alternate representation of Nassarius Duméril, 1805
- Nassarius (Panormella) Costa, 1840: synonym of Nassarius (Cyclope) Risso, 1826 (alternate representation of Nassarius Duméril, 1805)
- Nassarius (Paranassa) Conrad, 1867: synonym of Nassarius (Ilyanassa) Stimpson, 1865 (alternate representation of Nassarius Duméril, 1805)
- Nassarius (Parcanassa) Iredale, 1936: synonym of Nassarius (Plicarcularia) Thiele, 1929 (alternate representation of Nassarius Duméril, 1805)
- Nassarius (Plicarcularia) Thiele, 1929: alternate representation of Nassarius Duméril, 1805
- Nassarius (Profundinassa) Thiele, 1929: alternate representation of Nassarius Duméril, 1805
- Nassarius (Proneritula) Thiele, 1929: alternate representation of Nassarius Duméril, 1805
- Nassarius (Psilarius) Woodring, 1964: alternate representation of Nassarius Duméril, 1805
- Nassarius (Pygmaeonassa) Annadale, 1924: alternate representation of Nassarius Duméril, 1805
- Nassarius (Retiarcularia) Shuto, 1969: synonym of Nassarius (Plicarcularia) Thiele, 1929 (alternate representation of Nassarius Duméril, 1805)
- Nassarius (Reticunassa) Iredale, 1936: synonym of Nassarius (Hima) Gray, 1852 ex Leach, ms. alternate representation of Nassarius Duméril, 1805)
- Nassarius (Schizopyga) Conrad, 1856: synonym of Nassarius (Caesia) H. Adams & A. Adams, 1853 (alternate representation of Nassarius Duméril, 1805)
- Nassarius (Sphaeronassa) Locard, 1886: alternate representation of Nassarius Duméril, 1805
- Nassarius (Tarazeuxis) Iredale, 1936: synonym of Nassarius (Telasco) H. Adams & A. Adams, 1853 (alternate representation of Nassarius Duméril, 1805)
- Nassarius (Tavanothia) Iredale, 1936: synonym of Nassarius (Niotha) H. Adams & A. Adams, 1853 (alternate representation of Nassarius Duméril, 1805)
- Nassarius (Telasco) H. Adams & A. Adams, 1853: alternate representation of Nassarius Duméril, 1805
- Nassarius (Tritia) A. Adams, 1853: synonym of Nassarius (Hinia) Gray, 1847 (alternate representation of Nassarius Duméril, 1805)
- Nassarius (Tritonella) A. Adams, 1852: synonym of Nassarius (Hima) Gray, 1852 ex Leach, ms. (alternate representation of Nassarius Duméril, 1805)
- Nassarius (Usita) Noszky, 1936: synonym of Nassarius (Uzita) H. Adams & A. Adams, 1853 (alternate representation of Nassarius Duméril, 1805)
- Nassarius (Uzita) H. Adams & A. Adams, 1853: alternate representation of Nassarius Duméril, 1805
- Nassarius (Venassa) Martens, 1881: synonym of Nassarius (Zeuxis) H. Adams & A. Adams, 1853 (alternate representation of Nassarius Duméril, 1805)
- Nassarius (Varicinassa) Habe, 1946: alternate representation of Nassarius Duméril, 1805
- Nassarius (Zaphon) H. Adams & A. Adams, 1853: synonym of Nassarius (Caesia) H. Adams & A. Adams, 1853 (alternate representation of Nassarius Duméril, 1805)
- Nassarius (Zeuxis) H. Adams & A. Adams, 1853: alternate representation of Nassarius Duméril, 1805
