= Nassarius dekkeri =

Scientific classification
- Kingdom: Animalia
- Phylum: Mollusca
- Class: Gastropoda
- Subclass: Caenogastropoda
- Order: Neogastropoda
- Family: Nassariidae
- Genus: Nassarius
- Species: N. dekkeri

Binomial name
- Nassarius dekkeri Kool, 2001

Species of gastropod

Nassarius dekkeri is a species of sea snail, a marine gastropod mollusc in the family Nassariidae, the Nassa mud snails or dog whelks.

== Description ==
The shell grows to a length of 10 mm.

Family Tree: Animalia (Kingdom) > Mollusca (Phylum) > Gastropoda (Class) > Neogastropoda (Order) > Nassariidae (Family) > Nassarius (Genus) > dekkeri (Species)

== Distribution ==
This species occurs in the Red Sea.

They are mainly found in Egypt, Endemic species, Gulf of Aqaba / Gulf of Eliat, Israel, Red Sea
