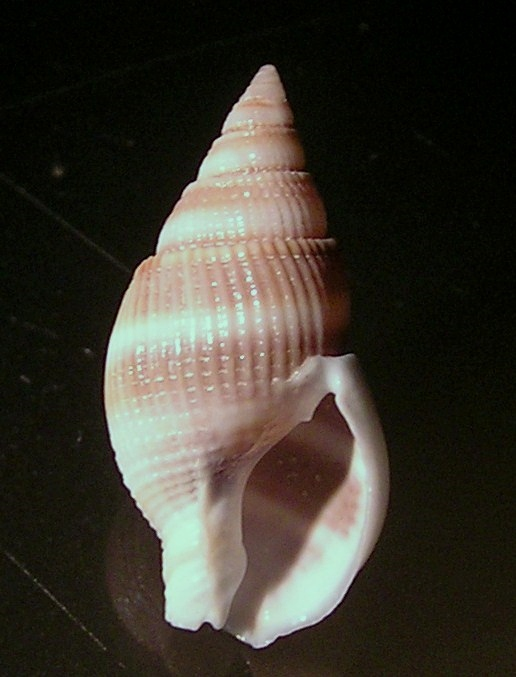
- Shell of Nassarius vinctus

Scientific classification
- Kingdom: Animalia
- Phylum: Mollusca
- Class: Gastropoda
- Subclass: Caenogastropoda
- Order: Neogastropoda
- Family: Nassariidae
- Genus: Nassarius
- Species: N. vinctus

Binomial name
- Nassarius vinctus (Marrat, 1877)

Synonyms
- Nassa (Amycla) circumtexta E. von Martens, 1904; Nassa (Tritia) trifasciata A. Adams, 1853; Nassa aenigmatica W. H. Turton, 1932; Nassa analogica G. B. Sowerby III, 1903; Nassa circumtexta E. von Martens, 1904 ·; Nassa trifasciata A. Adams, 1853 (invalid: secondary junior homonym of Buccinum trifasciatum Gmelin, 1791); Nassa vincta Marrat, 1877 (original combination); Nassarius (Telasco) vinctus (Marrat, 1877); Nassarius analogicus (G. B. Sowerby III, 1903); Nassarius circumtextus (E. von Martens, 1904); Nassarius trifasciatus (A. Adams, 1853)

= Nassarius vinctus =

Species of gastropod

Nassarius vinctus, common name the violet-mouthed dog-whelk, is a species of sea snail, a marine gastropod mollusc in the family Nassariidae, the nassa mud snails or dog whelks.

== Description ==
The length of the shell attains 22 mm.

The shell is small, with a relatively elongated spire and weakly convex whorls. The periphery is rounded, and the sculpture is variable, often reticulate. It consists of low axial ribs crossed by broad, flat spiral cords with narrow intervals, though the axial ribs may be weak or absent in some specimens. The inner lip features a thin, glossy callus that extends over the parietal region. The outer lip is not noticeably thickened and may be smooth internally or display weak, in-running ridges. The siphonal notch is wide and shallow.

Fresh specimens are reddish-brown to purplish-brown, typically featuring pale spiral bands. Axial ribs, when present, are paler. The inner lip and interior of the aperture are violet, though the color intensity fades over time. The shell is often encrusted with marine organisms, and its surface frequently becomes chalky or etched.

== Distribution ==
This marine species is endemic to South Afriuca and occurs off the West coast and Agulhas Bank (northern Namibia to western Transkei) at depths between 10 m and 150 m.
