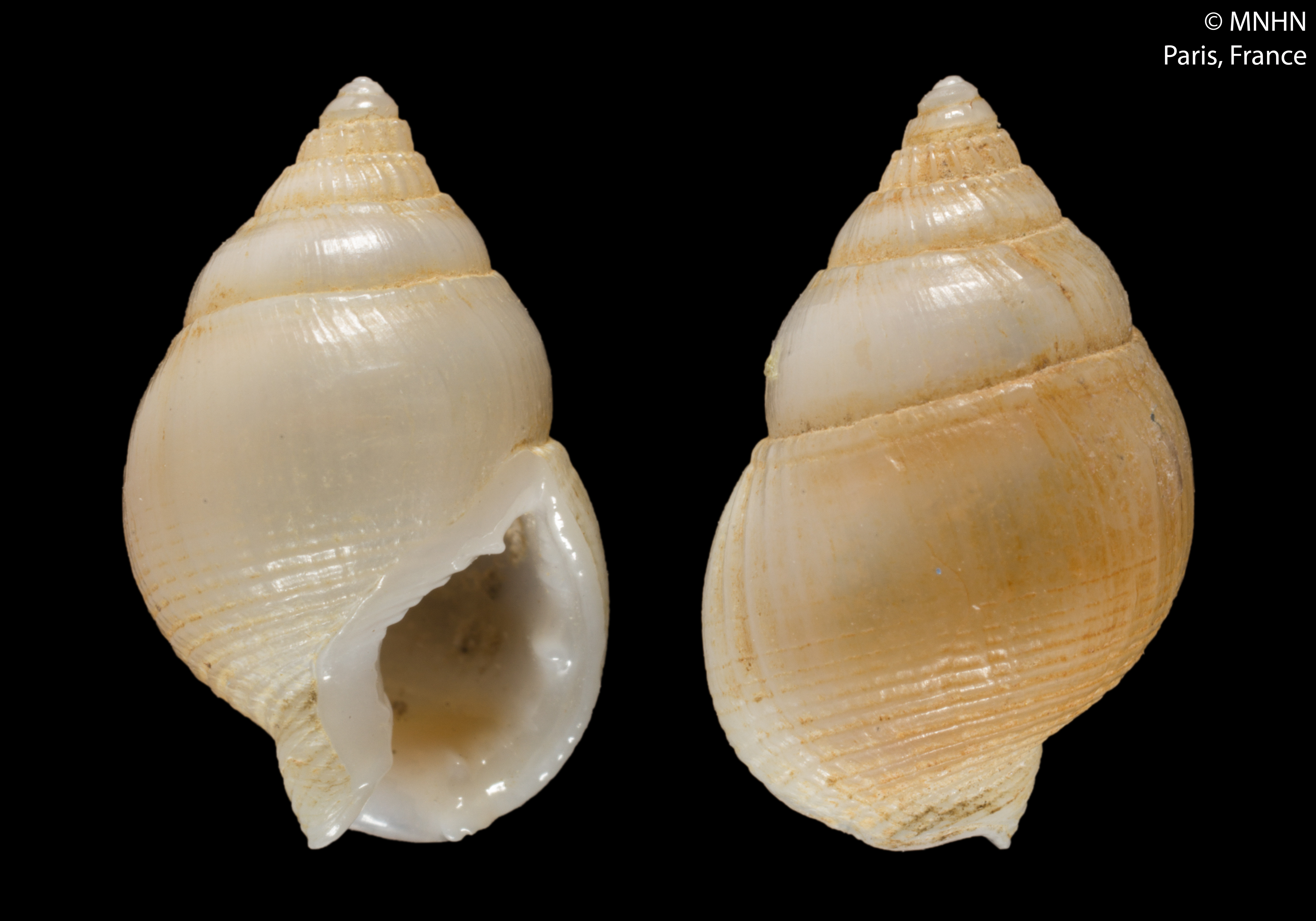
- Shell of Nassarius boucheti (holotype at MNHN, Paris)

Scientific classification
- Kingdom: Animalia
- Phylum: Mollusca
- Class: Gastropoda
- Subclass: Caenogastropoda
- Order: Neogastropoda
- Family: Nassariidae
- Genus: Nassarius
- Species: N. boucheti

Binomial name
- Nassarius boucheti Kool, 2004

= Nassarius boucheti =

Species of gastropod

Nassarius boucheti is a species of sea snail, a marine gastropod mollusk in the family Nassariidae, the Nassa mud snails or dog whelks.

== Description ==
The length of the shell varies between 8 mm and 12 mm.

== Distribution ==
This species occurs in the Pacific Ocean off New Caledonia, Vanuatu, Fiji and Tonga.
