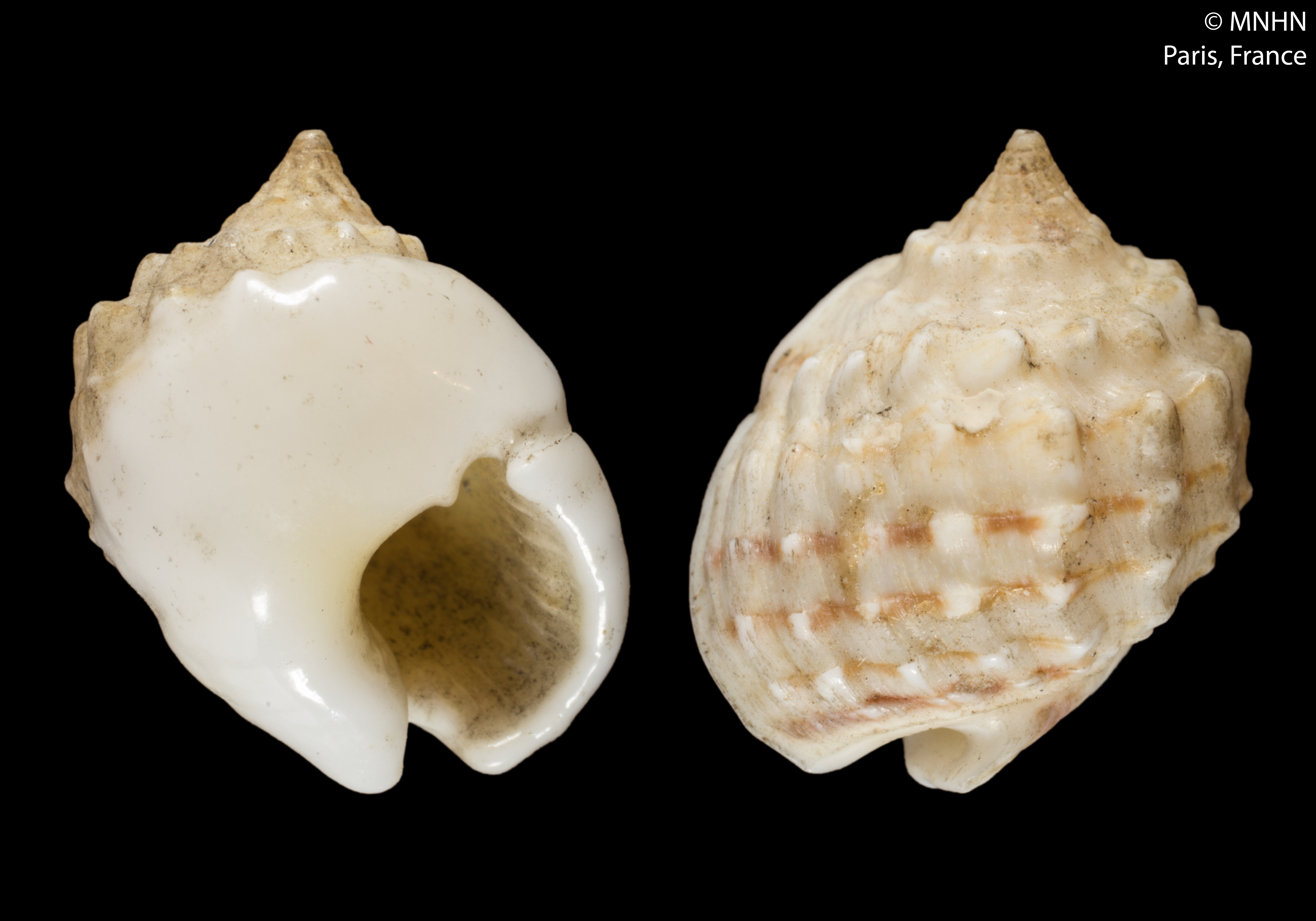
- Shell of Nassarius oneratus (holotype at MNHN, Paris)

Scientific classification
- Kingdom: Animalia
- Phylum: Mollusca
- Class: Gastropoda
- Subclass: Caenogastropoda
- Order: Neogastropoda
- Family: Nassariidae
- Genus: Nassarius
- Species: N. oneratus

Binomial name
- Nassarius oneratus (Deshayes, 1863)

Synonyms
- Nassa obliqua Hombron & Jacquinot, 1848 (invalid: secondary junior homonym of Buccinum obliquum Kiener, 1841); Nassa obliqua Pease, 1865 (invalid: junior homonym of Nassa obliqua Hombron & Jacquinot, 1848); Nassa obliqua Rousseau, 1854 (invalid: junior homonym of Nassa obliqua Hombron & Jacquinot, 1848); Nassa onerata Deshayes, 1863 (original combination); Nassa onerato Deshayes, 1863 (misspelling); Nassarius (Plicarcularia) oneratus (Deshayes, 1863)

= Nassarius oneratus =

Species of gastropod

Nassarius oneratus, common name the loaded nassa, is a species of sea snail, a marine gastropod mollusc in the family Nassariidae, the nassa mud snails or dog whelks.

== Description ==
The length of the shell varies between 10 mm and 18 mm.

== Distribution ==
This species occurs in the Indo-West Pacific off La Réunion and the Mascarene Basin; also off the Solomon Islands.
