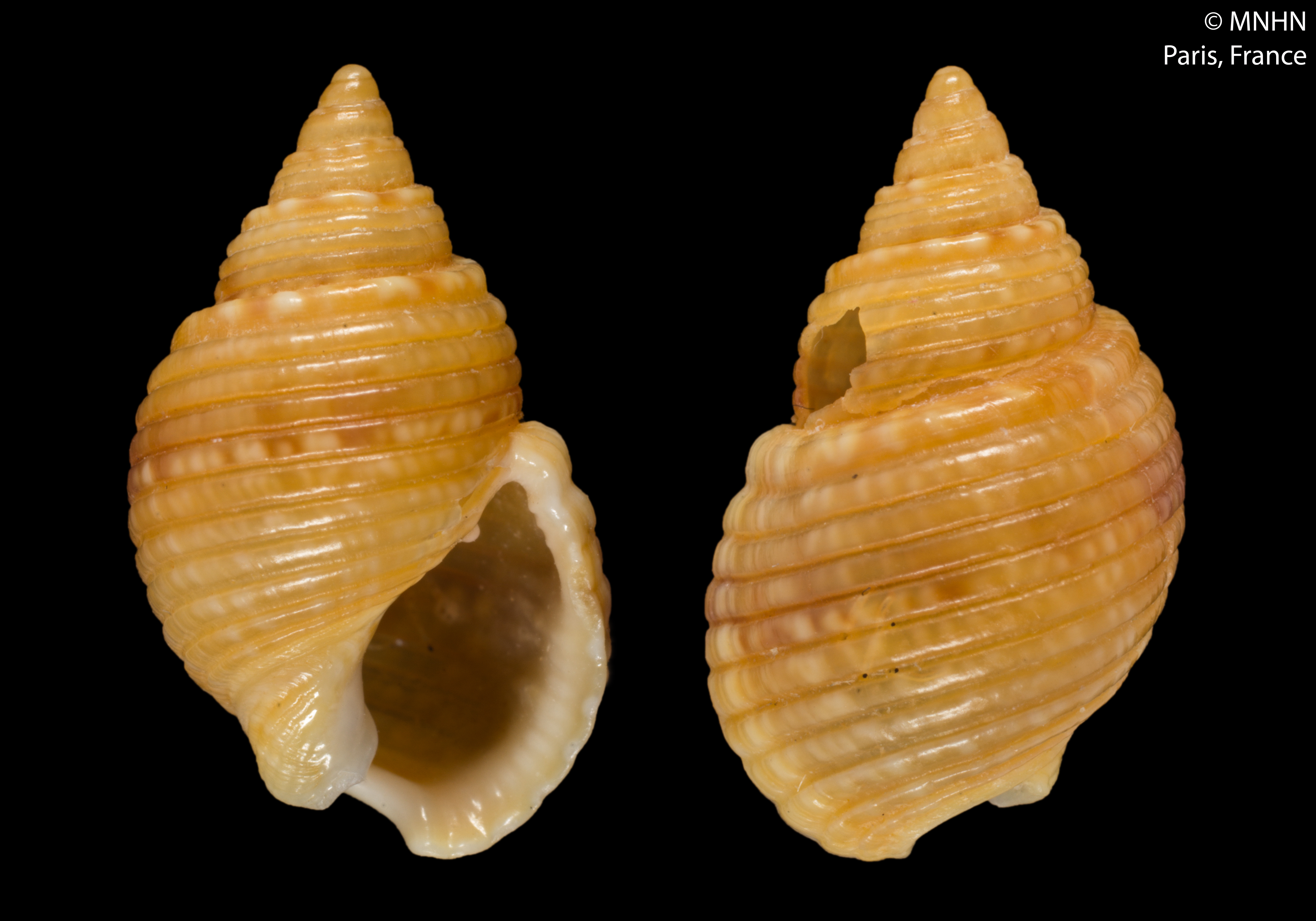
- Shell of Nassarius mirabilis (holotype at MNHN, Paris)

Scientific classification
- Kingdom: Animalia
- Phylum: Mollusca
- Class: Gastropoda
- Subclass: Caenogastropoda
- Order: Neogastropoda
- Family: Nassariidae
- Subfamily: Nassariinae
- Genus: Nassarius
- Species: N. mirabilis

Binomial name
- Nassarius mirabilis Bozzetti, 2007

= Nassarius mirabilis =

Species of gastropod

Nassarius mirabilis is a species of sea snail, a marine gastropod mollusk in the family Nassariidae, the nassa mud snails or dog whelks.

== Description ==
The length of the shell varies between 9.5 mm and 13 mm.

== Distribution ==
This species occurs in the Indian Ocean off Southern Madagascar.
