= Nassarius thachi =

Scientific classification
- Kingdom: Animalia
- Phylum: Mollusca
- Class: Gastropoda
- Subclass: Caenogastropoda
- Order: Neogastropoda
- Family: Nassariidae
- Genus: Nassarius
- Species: N. thachi

Binomial name
- Nassarius thachi Dekker, 2004

Synonyms
- Nassarius (Zeuxis) thachi Dekker, 2004

Species of gastropod

Nassarius thachi is a species of sea snail, a marine gastropod mollusk in the family Nassariidae, which includes the nassa mud snails and dog whelks. There is no official common name for this species.

== Description ==
The shell is an elongated egg shape with ribbing, measuring approximately 25 to 36 mm long on average; however, larger specimens can reach up to 38 mm in length. They are usually light brown to grayish brown with two to three darker brown broad spiral bands. The inside of the shell is light cream to white.

== Distribution ==
This species occurs in the tropical Western Pacific off China, Taiwan, Vietnam, Indonesia, Fiji.
