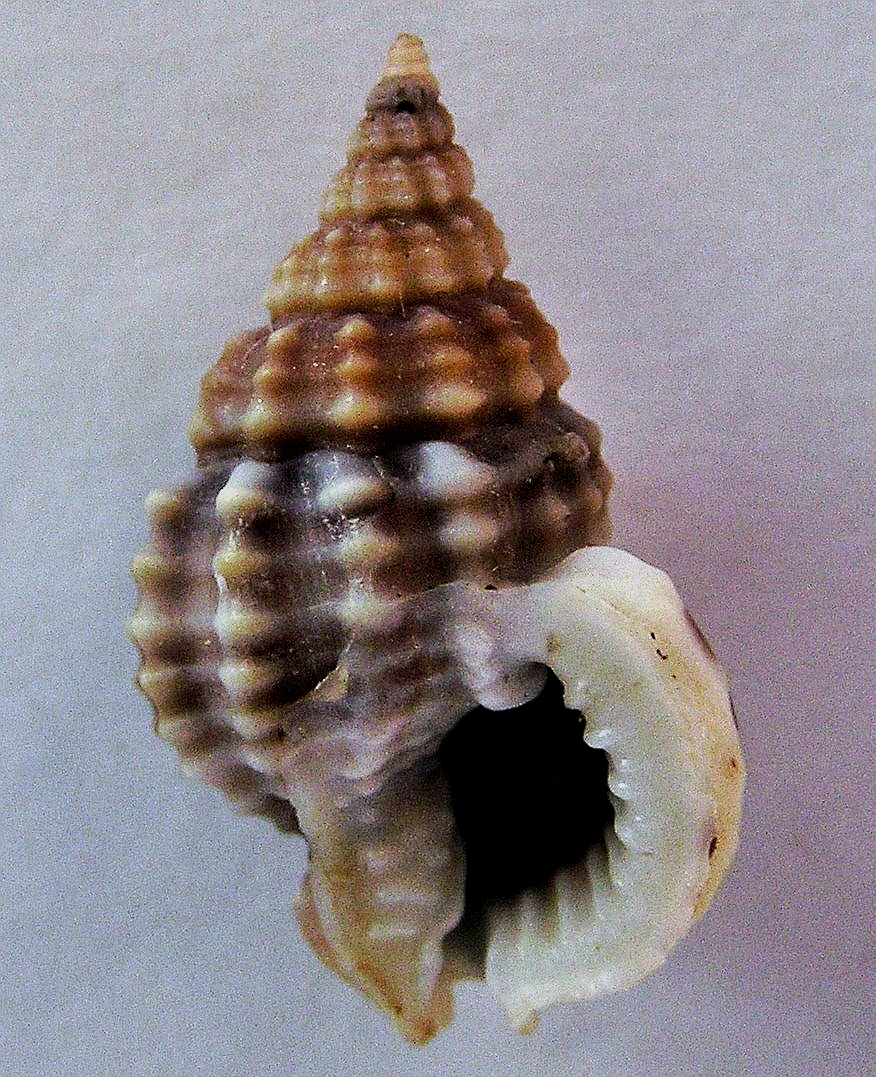

Scientific classification
- Kingdom: Animalia
- Phylum: Mollusca
- Class: Gastropoda
- Subclass: Caenogastropoda
- Order: Neogastropoda
- Family: Nassariidae
- Genus: Nassarius
- Species: N. tritoniformis

Binomial name
- Nassarius tritoniformis (Kiener, 1841)

Synonyms
- Buccinum tritoniformis Kiener, 1841 (basionym); Nassarius (Nassarius) tritoniformis (Kiener, 1841)

= Nassarius tritoniformis =

Species of gastropod

Nassarius tritoniformis is a species of sea snail, a marine gastropod mollusc in the family Nassariidae, the nassa mud snails or dog whelks.

== Description ==
The length of the shell varies between 15 mm and 25 mm

== Distribution ==
This species occurs in the Atlantic Ocean off Angola and Senegal
