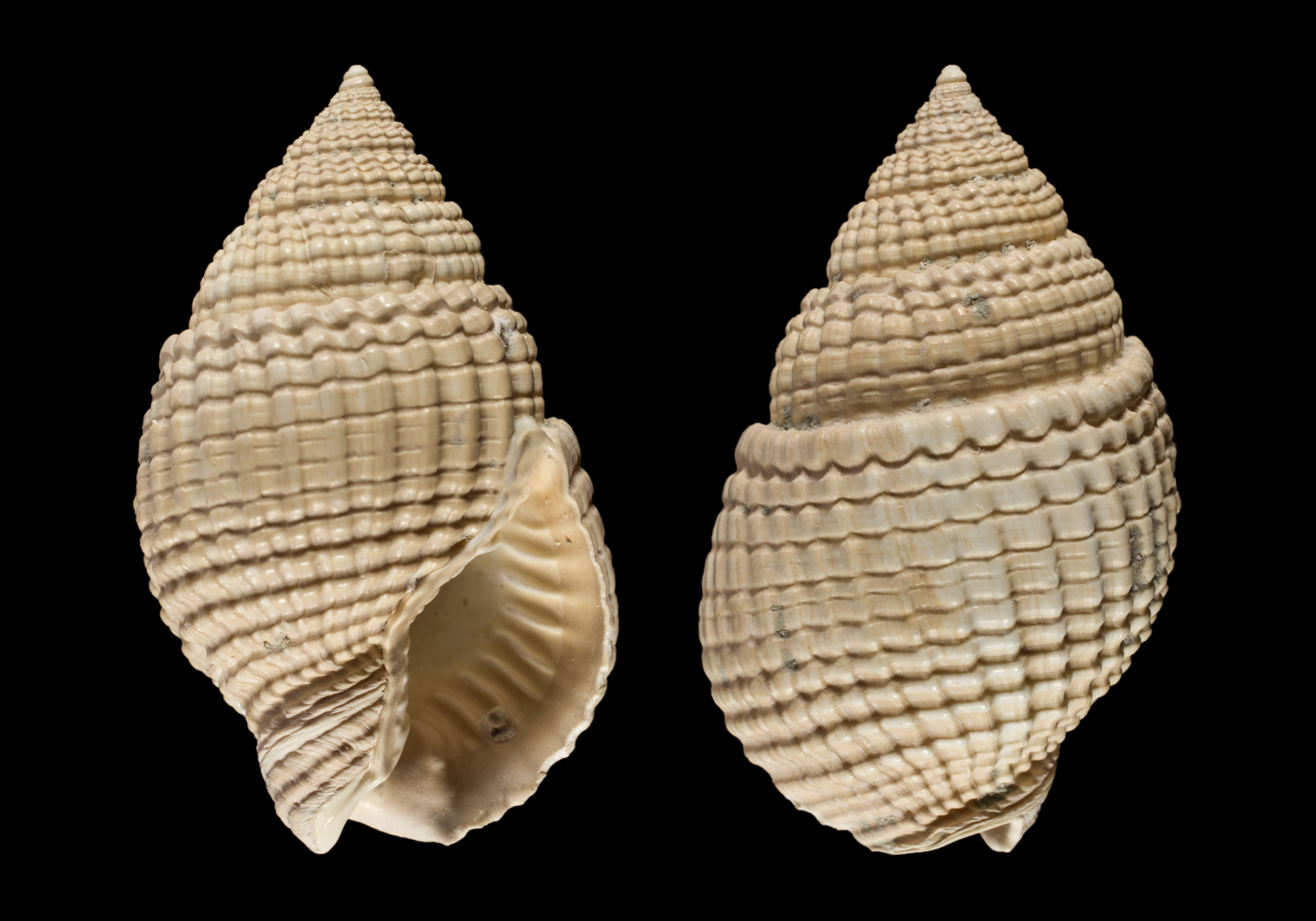
- Shell of Nassarius garuda (holotype at MNHN, Paris)

Scientific classification
- Kingdom: Animalia
- Phylum: Mollusca
- Class: Gastropoda
- Subclass: Caenogastropoda
- Order: Neogastropoda
- Family: Nassariidae
- Subfamily: Nassariinae
- Genus: Nassarius
- Species: N. garuda

Binomial name
- Nassarius garuda Kool, 2007

= Nassarius garuda =

Species of gastropod

Nassarius garuda is a species of sea snail, a marine gastropod mollusc in the family Nassariidae, the Nassa mud snails or dog whelks.

== Description ==
The length of the shell attains 20.7 mm.

Nassarius garuda was discovered in 1991 during a French-Indonesian KARUBAR Expedition to East Indonesia by the Muséum national d'Histoire naturelle. It is native to the Tanimbar Islands. The species was named after the Garuda, a large mythical bird which appears in both Hindu and Buddhist mythology.

== Appearance ==
The shell of the Nassarius Garuda is bulbous, with an average height of 20.7 mm, and a width of 12.0 mm. The spire at the top makes up one-third of the total shell length. There is little variability between specimens. The shell has a spiral pattern which resembles beads.
