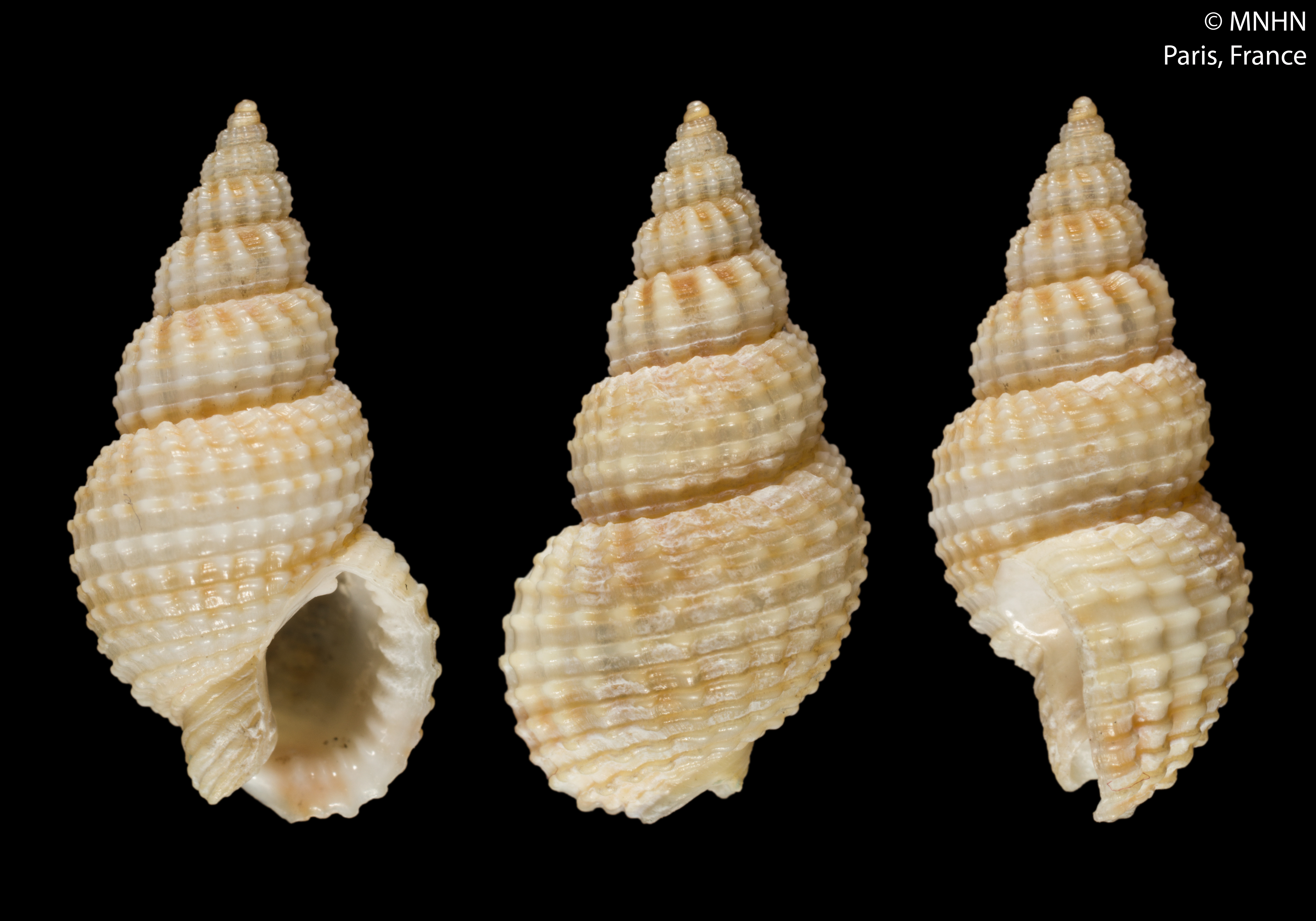
- Shell of Nassarius roissyi (syntype at MNHN, Paris)

Scientific classification
- Kingdom: Animalia
- Phylum: Mollusca
- Class: Gastropoda
- Subclass: Caenogastropoda
- Order: Neogastropoda
- Family: Nassariidae
- Genus: Nassarius
- Species: N. roissyi

Binomial name
- Nassarius roissyi (Deshayes, 1832)

Synonyms
- Buccinum roissyi Deshayes, 1832 (original combination); Nassarius (Zeuxis) roissyi (Deshayes, 1832) · accepted, alternate representation

= Nassarius roissyi =

Species of gastropod

Nassarius roissyi is a species of sea snail, a marine gastropod mollusk in the family Nassariidae, the Nassa mud snails or dog whelks.

== Description ==
The length of the shell attains 15.1 mm.

The shell is elongated and subturreted. The long spire is pointed. It is formed of eight or nine convex whorls, chequered by longitudinal folds, and pretty numerous and very regular transverse striae. The body whorl is short and subglobular. The small aperture is ovate, oblong, and white in all its parts. The outer lip is finely striated internally. The columella is cylindrical, obliquely truncated, and terminated at the base by a deep emargination, which is recurved towards the back of the shell. The coloring is a little remarkable: it is of a uniform, pale, fawn-color, but interrupted on the body whorl by an obscure and transverse whitish zone.

== Distribution ==
This species occurs in the Indian Ocean.
