= Nassarius delicatus =

Scientific classification
- Kingdom: Animalia
- Phylum: Mollusca
- Class: Gastropoda
- Subclass: Caenogastropoda
- Order: Neogastropoda
- Family: Nassariidae
- Genus: Nassarius
- Species: N. delicatus

Binomial name
- Nassarius delicatus (A. Adams, 1852)

Synonyms
- Alectryon (Phrontis) alcimus Melvill, 1918; Hindsia nodicostata Adams, A., 1855; Nassa (Phrontis) delicata A. Adams, 1852; Nassa (Phrontis) tiarula Kiener, 1841; Nassa delicata A. Adams, 1852; Nassa nodicostata A. Adams, 1852; Nassarius aclimus Melvill, J.C., 1918; Nassarius (Niotha) delicatus (A. Adams, 1852); Phrontis nodicostata (A. Adams, 1852)

Species of gastropod

Nassarius delicatus is a species of sea snail, a marine gastropod mollusc in the family Nassariidae, the Nassa mud snails or dog whelks.

== Description ==
The length of the shell varies between 6 mm and 14 mm.

== Distribution ==
This species occurs in the Red Sea, in the Indo-West Pacific and off La Réunion.
