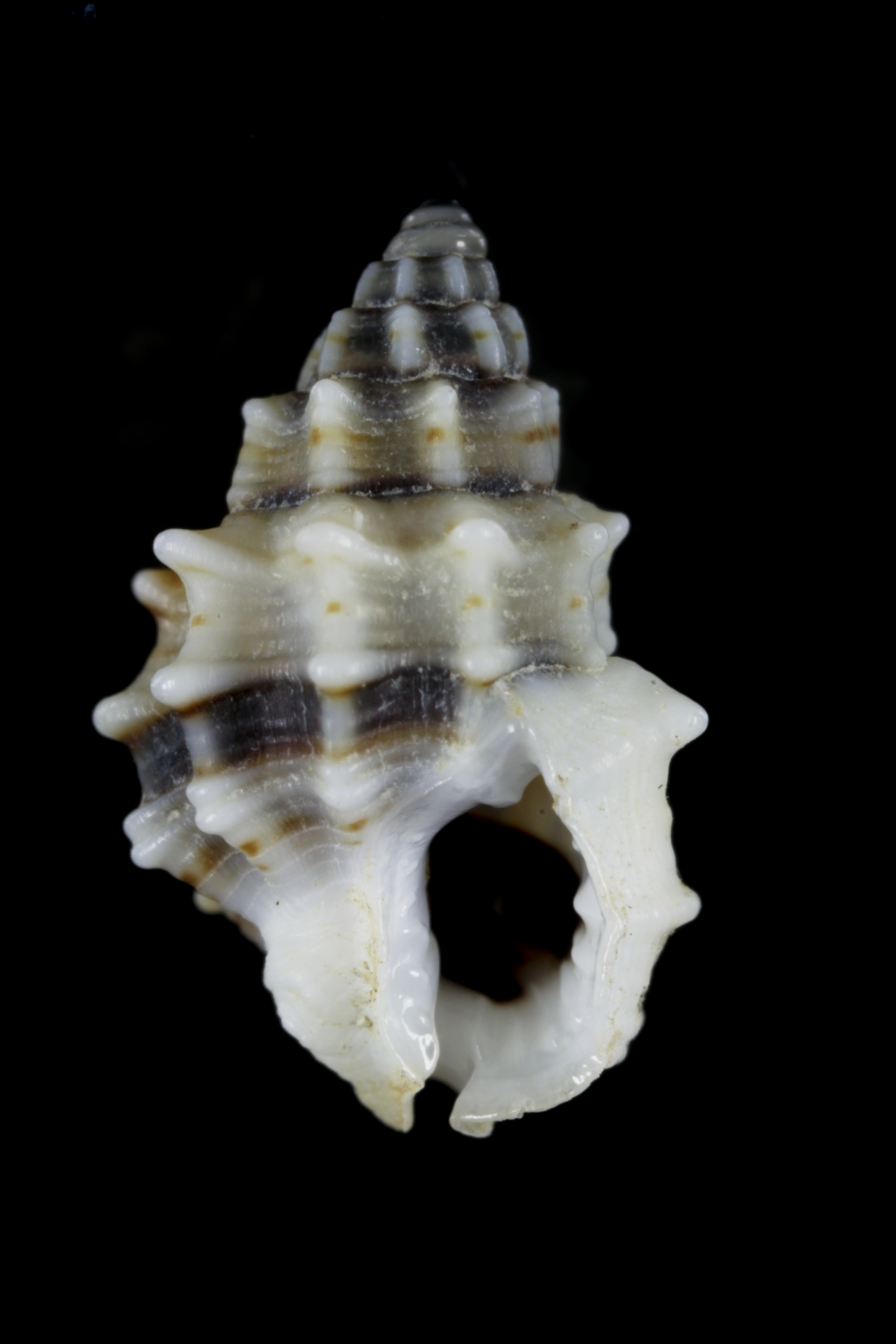
- Shell of Nassarius cinctellus (Gould, 1850) (specimen at MNHN, paris)

Scientific classification
- Kingdom: Animalia
- Phylum: Mollusca
- Class: Gastropoda
- Subclass: Caenogastropoda
- Order: Neogastropoda
- Family: Nassariidae
- Genus: Nassarius
- Species: N. cinctellus

Binomial name
- Nassarius cinctellus (Gould, 1850) (A. Adams, 1852)

Synonyms
- 1) Nassa cinctella A. Adams, 1852; 2) Nassa cinctella Gould, 1850; 2) Nassa geniculata A. Adams, 1852; 2) Nassa parva Marrat, 1880; 2) Nassarius (Niotha) cinctellus (Gould, 1850)

= Nassarius cinctellus =

Species of gastropod

Nassarius cinctellus is a species of sea snail, a marine gastropod mollusc in the family Nassariidae, the Nassa mud snails or dog whelks.1)

== Taxonomy ==
The name Nassa cinctella A. Adams, 1852, is a junior homonym of Nassa cinctella Gould, 1850, and the name Nassarius cinctellus (A. Adams, 1852) is thus nomenclaturally invalid. However, in the absence of a revision of southern Atlantic nassariids, it is uncertain whether there may be another name available for the same taxonomical species, or whether a replacement name is needed. Pending such a revision, WoRMS maintains the status quo by listing the two Nassarius cinctellus of Gould, 1850, and A. Adams, 1852, as valid.

In this article both taxa are mixed pending the revision, as it is not possible to create two articles with the same name for different species. The same goes for the entries in the Commons and in Wikidata.

== Description ==
The length of the shell varies between 5 mm and 7.5 mm.

This very pretty shell is well marked by its short conical form, its few prominent ribs, shouldered whorls, and thread-like vitta. (Description by Gould)

== Distribution ==
(A. Adams) In the Atlantic Ocean off St Helena; in the Red Sea;(Gould) in the Pacific Ocean off the Philippines and Papua New Guinea.
