= Nassarius crenulatus =

Scientific classification
- Kingdom: Animalia
- Phylum: Mollusca
- Class: Gastropoda
- Subclass: Caenogastropoda
- Order: Neogastropoda
- Family: Nassariidae
- Genus: Nassarius
- Species: N. crenulatus

Binomial name
- Nassarius crenulatus (Lamarck, 1816)

Synonyms
- Nassa crenatula Lamarck, 1816

Species of gastropod

Nassarius crenulatus is a species of sea snail, a marine gastropod mollusc in the family Nassariidae, the Nassa mud snails or dog whelks.

This species name has become a nomen dubium.

== Description ==
The shell grows to a length of 32 mm.

== Distribution ==
This species occurs in the Red Sea, in the Indian Ocean off Madagascar and Tanzania; off Taiwan.
