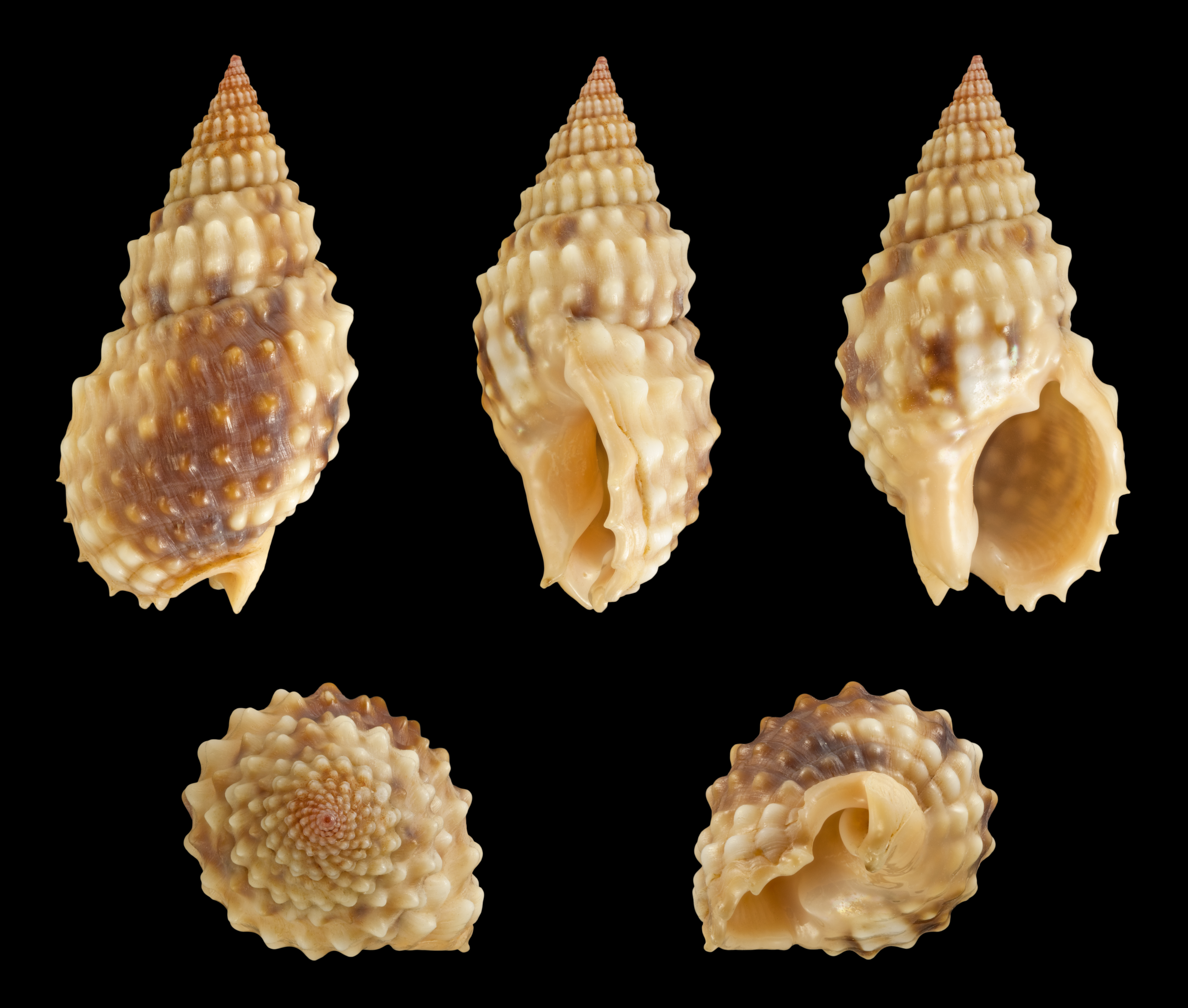
- Shell of Nassarius papillosus

Scientific classification
- Kingdom: Animalia
- Phylum: Mollusca
- Class: Gastropoda
- Subclass: Caenogastropoda
- Order: Neogastropoda
- Family: Nassariidae
- Genus: Nassarius
- Species: N. papillosus

Binomial name
- Nassarius papillosus (Linnaeus, 1758)

Synonyms
- Alectrion papillosum (Linnaeus, 1758); Buccinum papillosum Linnaeus, 1758; Nassa (Alectryon) papillosa (Linnaeus, 1758); Nassa (Alectryon) papillosa var. seminuda Dautzenberg, 1929; Nassa papillosa (Linnaeus, 1758); Nassarius (Alectrion) papillosus (Linnaeus, 1758)

= Nassarius papillosus =

Species of gastropod

Nassarius papillosus, common name : the pimpled nassa, is a species of sea snail, a marine gastropod mollusc in the family Nassariidae, the nassa mud snails or dog whelks.

== Description ==
The shell size varies between 30 mm and 52 mm

The thick shell is ovate and conical. It is composed of eight convex and subcarinated whorls. The whole surface ornamented with small tubercles formed like rounded papillae, eight transverse rows of which appear upon the body whorl, four upon the second, and three only upon those of the spire. They gradually diminish in size towards the summit, which is generally of a rose color. The white aperture is ovate, rounded, terminated at its upper part by an angle of the outer lip, and a thick ridge of the left lip, which form a canal. The emargination at the base is oblique. The outer lip is thick, furnished upon its edge with six or seven spinose teeth, and in the interior with numerous transverse striae, very fine, and slightly apparent. The left lip is smooth, and obliterated above. It forms a convex varix at the base, and terminates near this point by a straight and somewhat pointed projection. The general color is whitish or reddish, marked upon the convexity of the lowest whorl, with a large red or fawn-colored spot, the rest of the spire sometimes sprinkled with other smaller spots of the same color.

== Distribution ==
This species occurs in the Indian Ocean off Aldabra, Chagos, Madagascar, the Mascarene Basin, Mauritius and Réunion, and also in the Pacific (New Caledonia, Marquesas Islands); off Australia (Northern Territory, Queensland, Western Australia).
