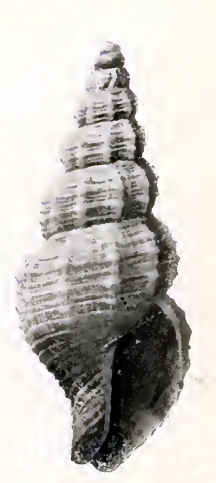
- Original image of a shell of Mangelia dejanira

Scientific classification
- Kingdom: Animalia
- Phylum: Mollusca
- Class: Gastropoda
- Subclass: Caenogastropoda
- Order: Neogastropoda
- Superfamily: Conoidea
- Family: Mangeliidae
- Genus: Mangelia
- Species: M. dejanira

Binomial name
- Mangelia dejanira (W. H. Dall, 1919)

Synonyms
- Mangilia dejanira W. H. Dall, 1919 (original description)

= Mangelia dejanira =

Species of gastropod

Mangelia dejanira is a species of sea snail, a marine gastropod mollusk in the family Mangeliidae.

== Description ==
The length of the shell attains 11 mm, its diameter 4.5 mm.

(Original description) The small, brownish shell has an acute brown protoconch of 4½ regularly increasing whorls (apparently smooth but slightly eroded), changed abruptly into the sculpture of the five subsequent whorls. The axial sculpture consists of (on the body whorl 10) low rounded ribs with wider interspaces, obsolete on the base and the incremental sculpture indicated by the rather distant sharp striae. The spiral sculpture consists of (on the spire two, on the body whorl three) rather prominent nodules on the ribs with no conspicuous cord in the corresponding part of the interspaces; otherwise the spiral sculpture, especially on the latter whorls, comprises sharp narrow grooves with wider flattened interspaces which become more cordlike on the earlier whorls and the base. The whorls are moderately rounded with no indication of an anal fasciole. The suture is distinct but not appressed. The aperture in the type specimen is elongate ovate with a simple columella and a thin sharp outer lip. The siphonal canal is short, deep, forming a distinct but small siphonal fasciole and is slightly recurved.

This species bears a good resemblance of and may be a young specimen of Metaphos dejanira (Dall, 1919), that belongs to the family Nassariidae.

== Distribution ==
This marine species occurs off Baja California, Mexico.
