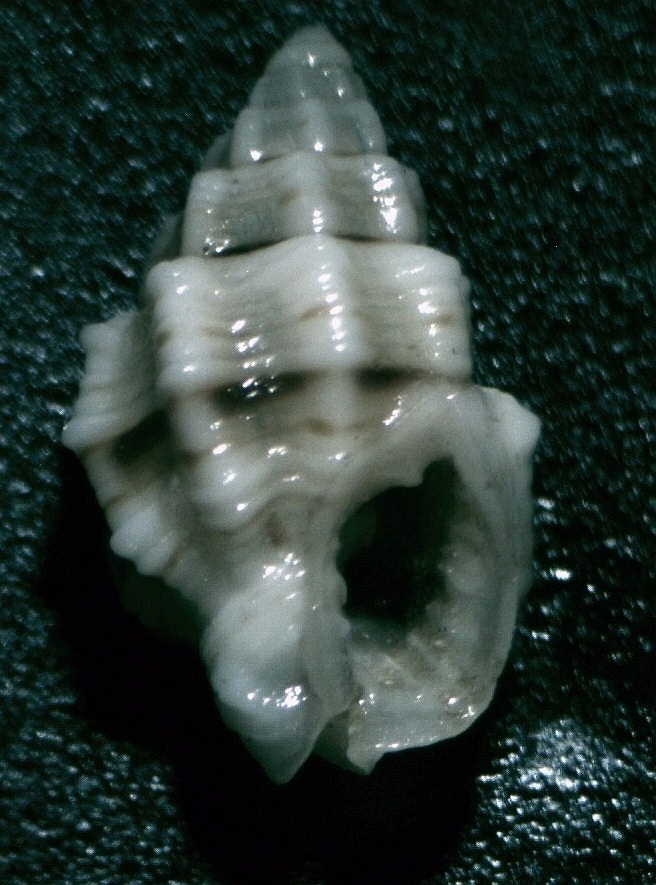

Scientific classification
- Kingdom: Animalia
- Phylum: Mollusca
- Class: Gastropoda
- Subclass: Caenogastropoda
- Order: Neogastropoda
- Family: Nassariidae
- Genus: Nassarius
- Species: N. echinatus

Binomial name
- Nassarius echinatus (A. Adams, 1852)

Synonyms
- Nassa (Hebra) echinata A. Adams, 1852; Nassa echinata A. Adams, 1852; Nassa quadrasi var. alba Hidalgo, 1904; Nassarius (Niotha) echinatus (A. Adams, 1852)

= Nassarius echinatus =

Species of gastropod

Nassarius echinatus is a species of sea snail, a marine gastropod mollusc in the family Nassariidae, the Nassa mud snails or dog whelks.

== Description ==
The length of the shell varies between 10 mm and 15 mm.

== Distribution ==
This species occurs in the Indo-West Pacific off the Aldabra Atoll and La Réunion.

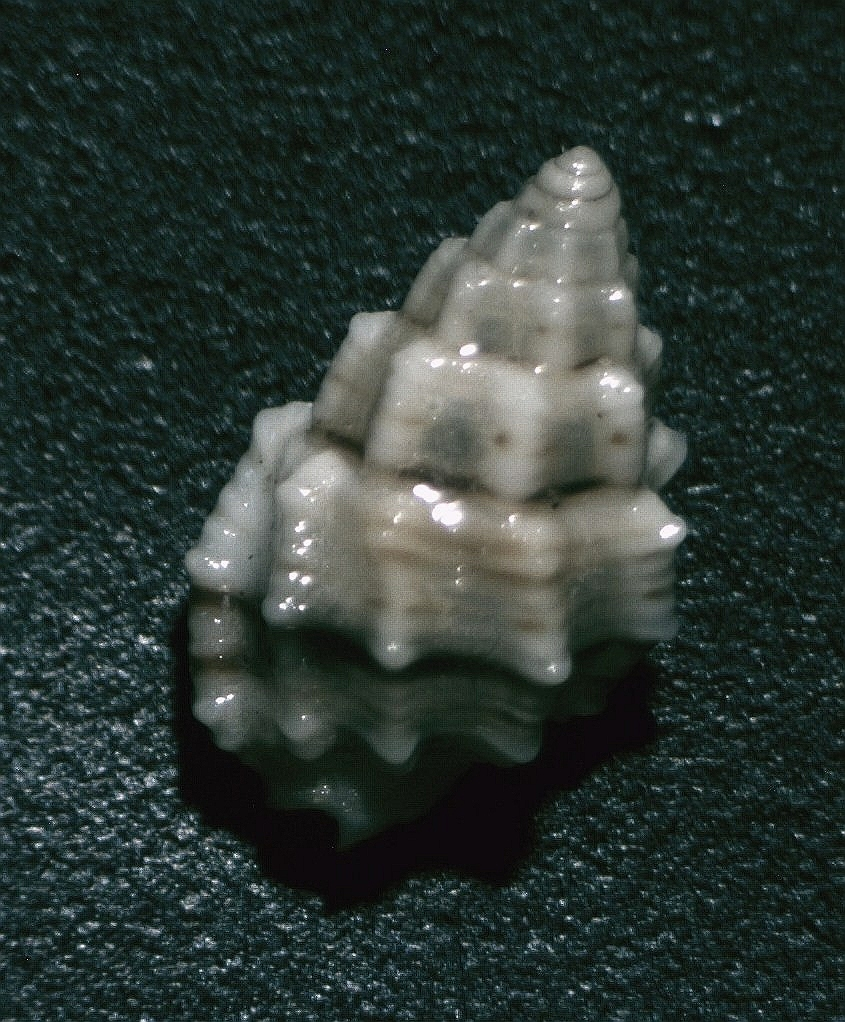
Nassarius echinatus, abapertural view
