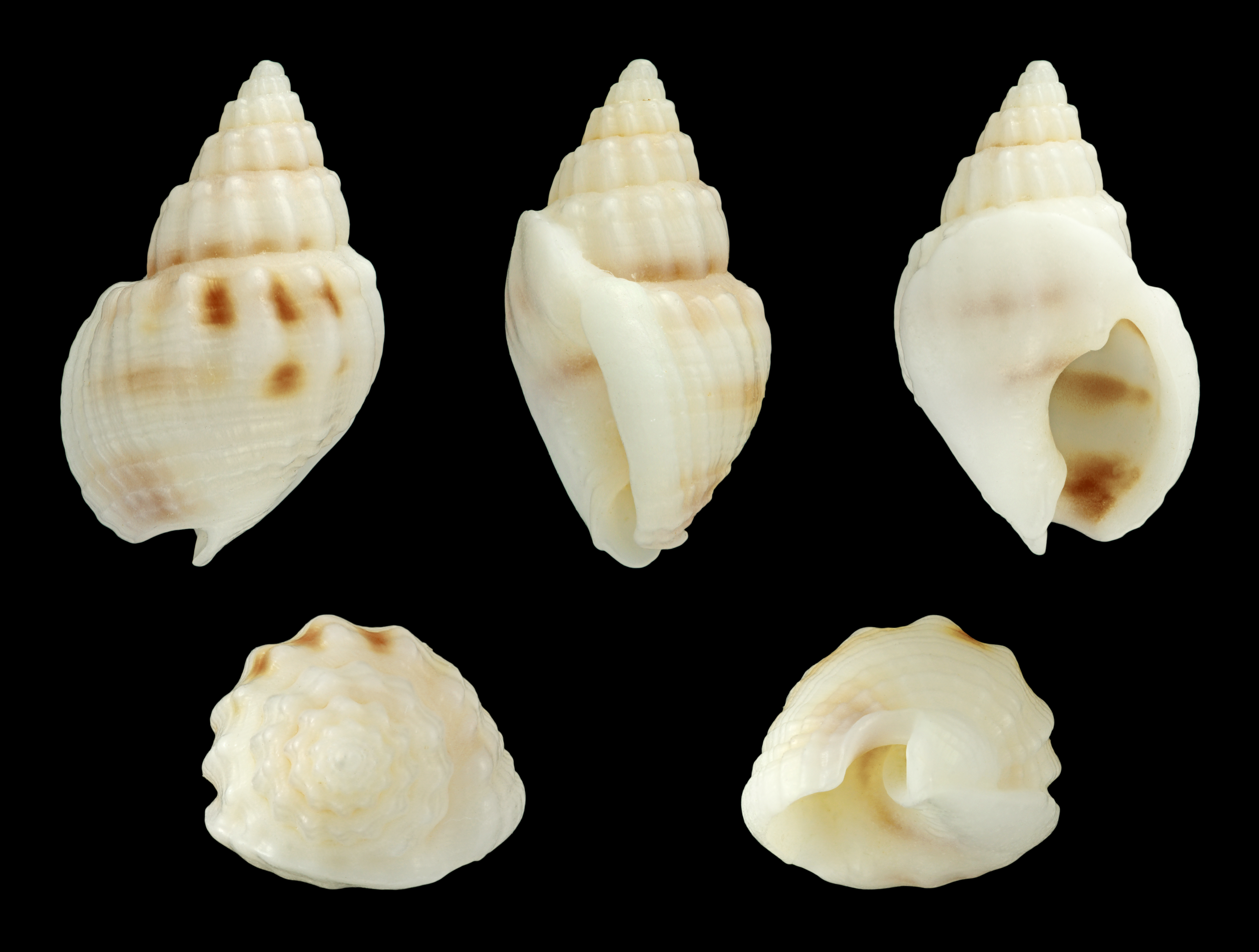

Scientific classification
- Kingdom: Animalia
- Phylum: Mollusca
- Class: Gastropoda
- Subclass: Caenogastropoda
- Order: Neogastropoda
- Family: Nassariidae
- Genus: Nassarius
- Species: N. fissilabris

Binomial name
- Nassarius fissilabris (A. Adams, 1852)

= Nassarius fissilabris =

Species of gastropod

Nassarius fissilabris is a species of sea snail, a marine gastropod mollusc in the family Nassariidae, the Nassa mud snails or dog whelks.

== Description ==
The shell size varies between 10 mm and 20 mm.

== Distribution ==
This species is distributed in the Red Sea and along Oman.
