= Nassarius tadjallii =

Scientific classification
- Kingdom: Animalia
- Phylum: Mollusca
- Class: Gastropoda
- Subclass: Caenogastropoda
- Order: Neogastropoda
- Family: Nassariidae
- Genus: Nassarius
- Species: N. tadjallii

Binomial name
- Nassarius tadjallii Moolenbeek, 2007

Species of gastropod

Nassarius tadjallii is a species of sea snail, a marine gastropod mollusc in the family Nassariidae, the Nassa mud snails or dog whelks.
