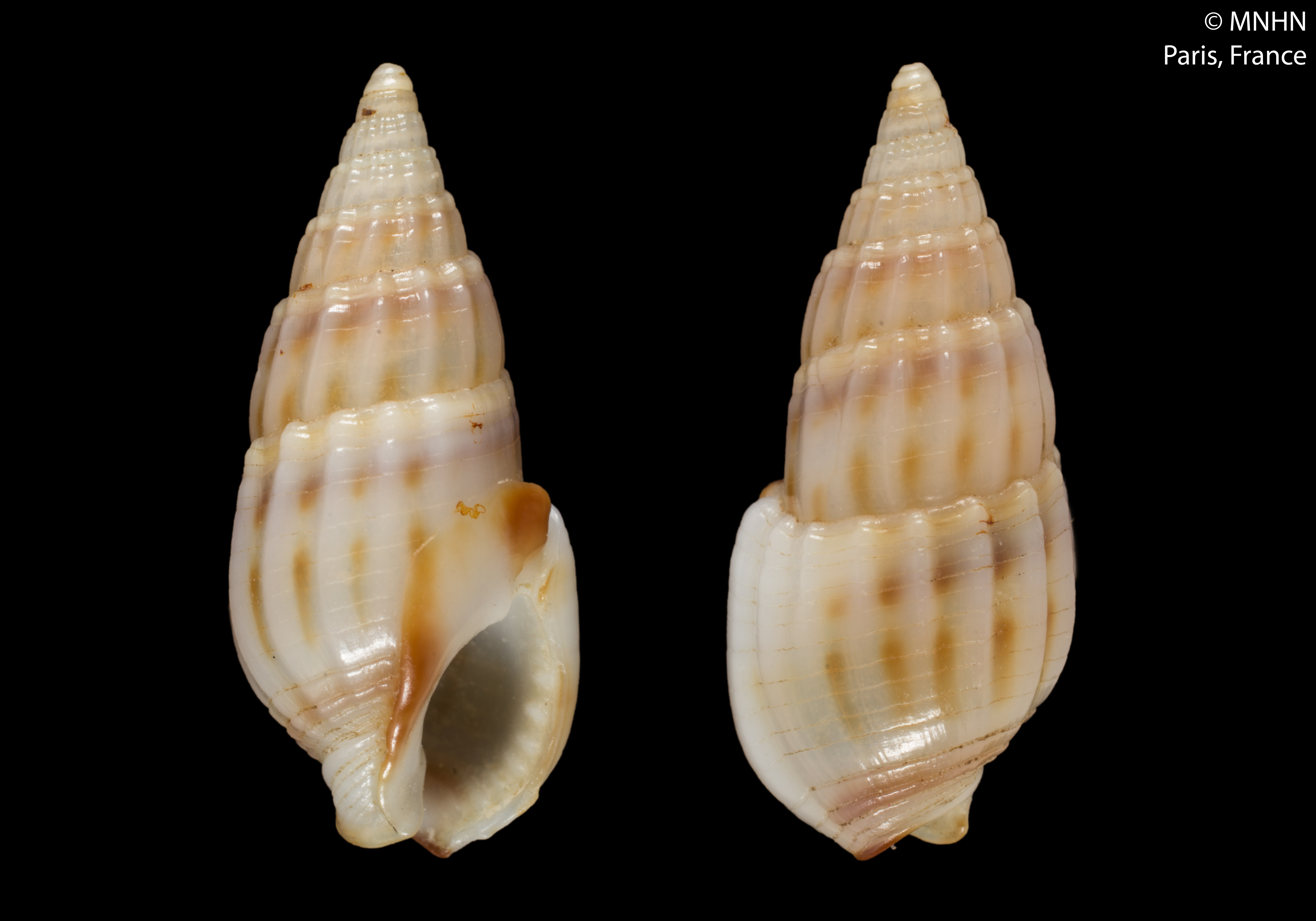
- Shell of Nassarius lavanonoensis (holotype at MNHN, Paris)

Scientific classification
- Kingdom: Animalia
- Phylum: Mollusca
- Class: Gastropoda
- Subclass: Caenogastropoda
- Order: Neogastropoda
- Family: Nassariidae
- Genus: Nassarius
- Species: N. lavanonoensis

Binomial name
- Nassarius lavanonoensis Bozzetti, 2006

Synonyms
- Nassarius (Aciculina) lavanonoensis Bozzetti, 2006

= Nassarius lavanonoensis =

Species of gastropod

Nassarius lavanonoensis is a species of sea snail, a marine gastropod mollusc in the family Nassariidae, the nassa mud snails or dog whelks.

== Description ==
The length of the shell varies between 11 mm and 15 mm.

== Distribution ==
This species occurs in the Indian Ocean off Madagascar.
