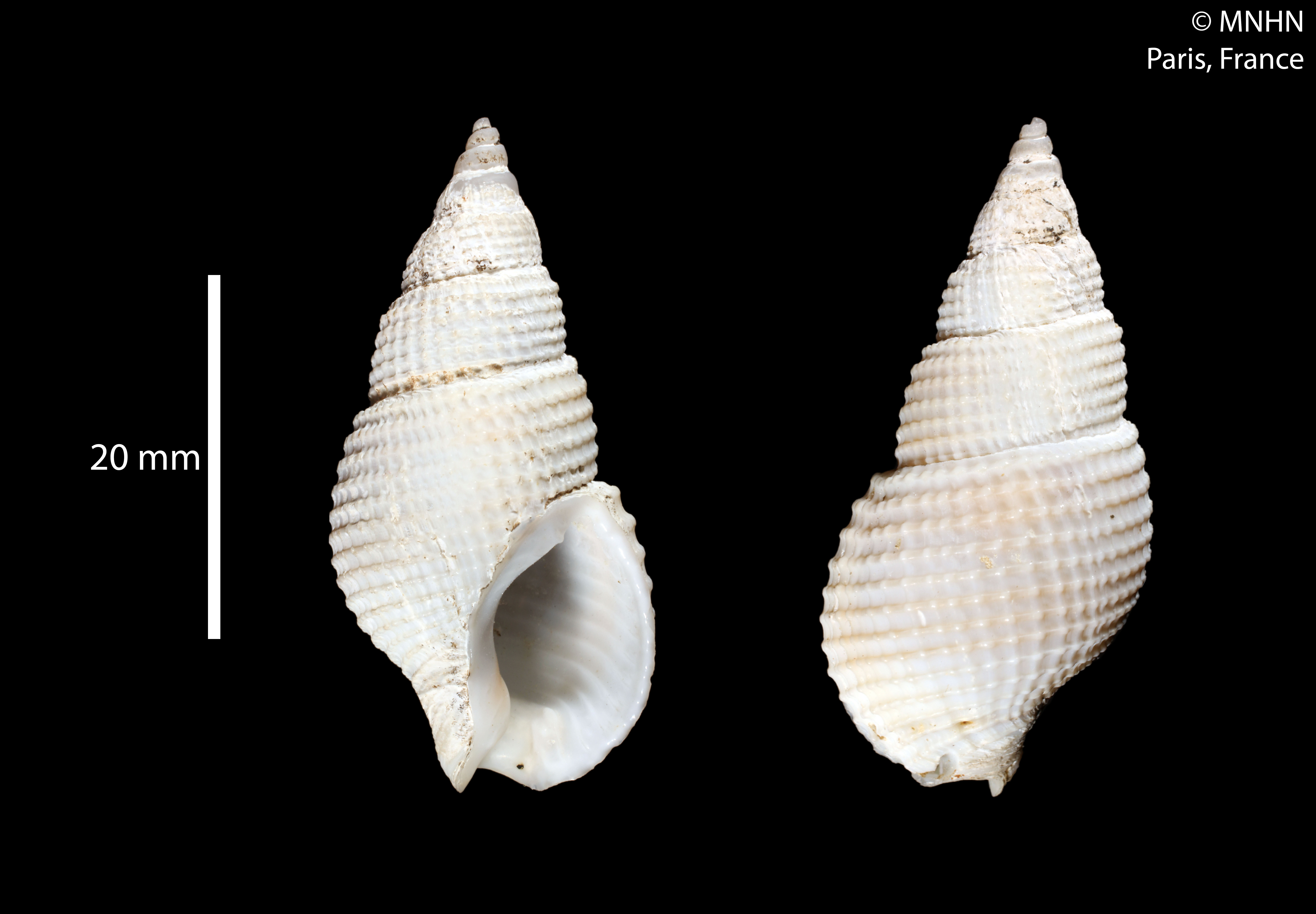
- Shell of Nassarius wolffi (paratype at MNHN, Paris)

Scientific classification
- Kingdom: Animalia
- Phylum: Mollusca
- Class: Gastropoda
- Subclass: Caenogastropoda
- Order: Neogastropoda
- Family: Nassariidae
- Genus: Nassarius
- Species: N. wolffi

Binomial name
- Nassarius wolffi (Knudsen, 1956)

Synonyms
- Hinia frigens malacitanae Maldonado Quiles, 1973; Nassa sadurnii Bot, 1972; Nassa wolffi Knudsen, 1956; Nassarius (Hima) wolffi (Knudsen, 1956)

= Nassarius wolffi =

Species of gastropod

Nassarius wolffi, common name the Torben Wolff nassa, is a species of sea snail, a marine gastropod mollusk in the family Nassariidae, the Nassa mud snails or dog whelks. It is named after the Danish marine biologist Torben Wolff.

== Description ==
The length of the shell varies between 25 mm and 45 mm.

Their functional type is Benthos.

Their feeding type is Scavenger.

== Distribution ==
This species occurs in the Western Mediterranean Sea and in the Atlantic Ocean off the Cape Verde Islands and Angola. Also found in Namibia.
