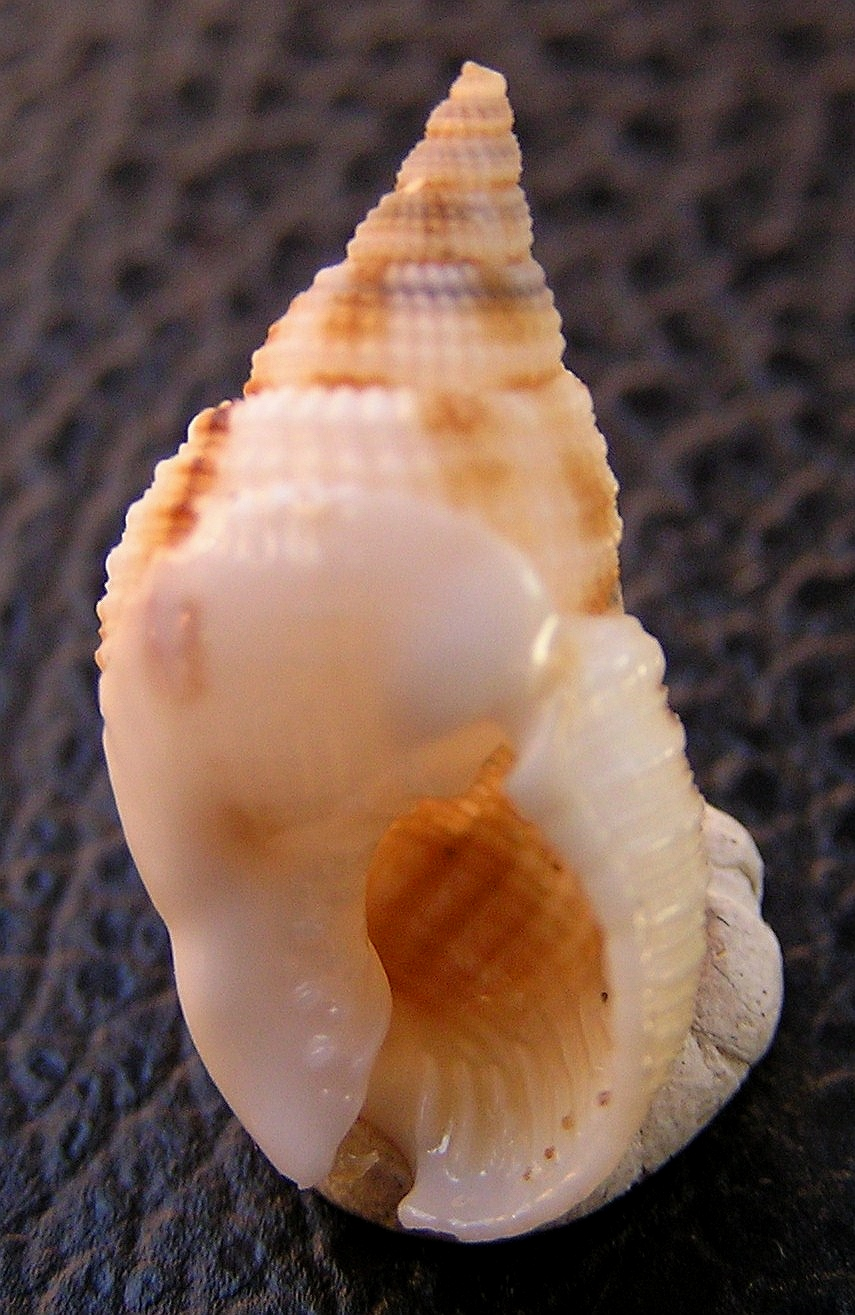
- Apertural view of a shell of Nassarius candens

Scientific classification
- Kingdom: Animalia
- Phylum: Mollusca
- Class: Gastropoda
- Subclass: Caenogastropoda
- Order: Neogastropoda
- Family: Nassariidae
- Genus: Nassarius
- Species: N. candens

Binomial name
- Nassarius candens (Hinds, 1844)

Synonyms
- Nassa (Niotha) candens Hinds, 1844; Nassa candens Hinds, 1844; Nassarius (Niotha) candens (Hinds, 1844)

= Nassarius candens =

Species of gastropod

Nassarius candens, common name the bright nassa, is a species of sea snail, a marine gastropod mollusk in the family Nassariidae, the Nassa mud snails or dog whelks.

== Description ==
The shell size varies between 12 mm and 21 mm. The shell is white with sections of brown.

(Original description in Latin) The shell is ovate, ventricose, and acuminate with a turreted shape, appearing pale and clouded with brown. It features six rounded whorls that are neatly cancellated and tuberculated at the angles; below the suture, it is thickened by two rows of tubercles. The lip is entire, and the aperture is marked by a white callus.

The shell is neatly cancellated, possessing an ovate and acuminate form with a turreted spire. Its whorls are characterized by a twin row of enlarged tubercles situated just beneath the suture—a feature that materially assists in its identification. The outer lip is considerably dilated at its lower edge, maintaining an entire margin, though in older specimens, this lip becomes thickened and even slightly everted.

== Distribution ==
This species occurs in the Pacific Ocean along the Marquesas Islands
