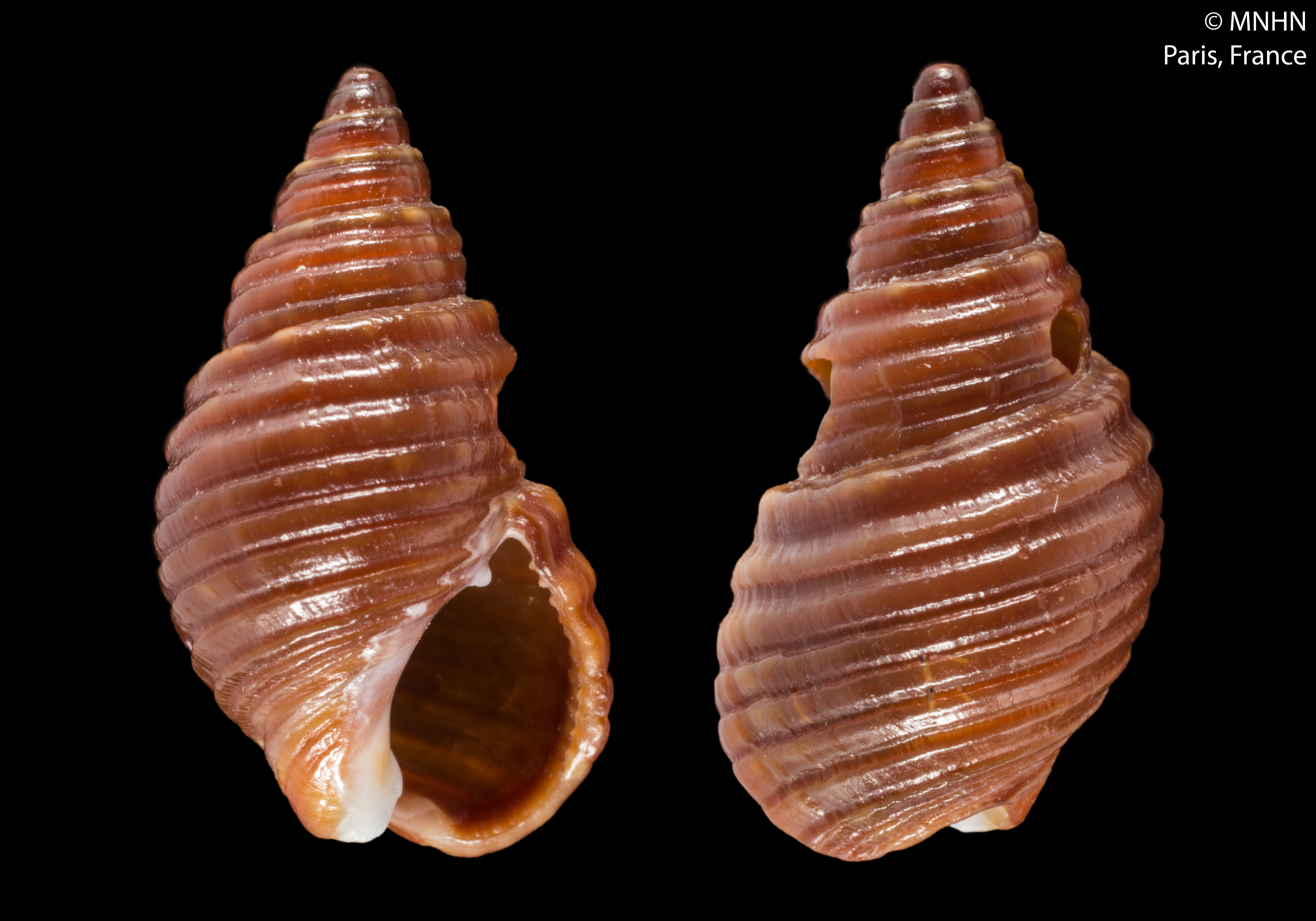
- Shell of Nassarius enzoi (holotype at MNHN, Paris)

Scientific classification
- Kingdom: Animalia
- Phylum: Mollusca
- Class: Gastropoda
- Subclass: Caenogastropoda
- Order: Neogastropoda
- Family: Nassariidae
- Subfamily: Nassariinae
- Genus: Nassarius
- Species: N. enzoi

Binomial name
- Nassarius enzoi Bozzetti, 2007

= Nassarius enzoi =

Species of gastropod

Nassarius enzoi is a species of sea snail, a marine gastropod mollusc in the family Nassariidae, the Nassa mud snails or dog whelks.

== Description ==
The length of the shell attains 13.1 mm.

== Distribution ==
This marine species occurs off Madagascar.
