= Nassarius samiae =

Scientific classification
- Kingdom: Animalia
- Phylum: Mollusca
- Class: Gastropoda
- Subclass: Caenogastropoda
- Order: Neogastropoda
- Family: Nassariidae
- Genus: Nassarius
- Species: N. samiae

Binomial name
- Nassarius samiae Kool, 2006

Species of gastropod

Nassarius samiae is a species of sea snail, a marine gastropod mollusc in the family Nassariidae, the Nassa mud snails or dog whelks.

== Description ==
The shell grows to a length of 20 mm.

== Distribution ==
This marine species occurs off the Philippines.
