= Nassarius scissuratus =

Scientific classification
- Kingdom: Animalia
- Phylum: Mollusca
- Class: Gastropoda
- Subclass: Caenogastropoda
- Order: Neogastropoda
- Family: Nassariidae
- Genus: Nassarius
- Species: N. scissuratus

Binomial name
- Nassarius scissuratus (Dall, 1889)

Synonyms
- Nassa scissurata Dall, 1889; Nassa scissurata penitida Dall, 1889; Nassarius (Nassarius) scissuratus Dall, 1889

Species of gastropod

Nassarius scissuratus is a species of sea snail, a marine gastropod mollusc in the family Nassariidae, the Nassa mud snails or dog whelks.

== Description ==
The length of the shell varies between 9 and 15 mm (0.35 and 0.59 in).

== Distribution ==
This species occurs in the Caribbean Sea, the Gulf of Mexico and the Lesser Antilles; in the Mid-Atlantic Ridge and in the Atlantic Ocean off Uruguay.
