= Nassarius macrodon =

Scientific classification
- Kingdom: Animalia
- Phylum: Mollusca
- Class: Gastropoda
- Subclass: Caenogastropoda
- Order: Neogastropoda
- Family: Nassariidae
- Genus: Nassarius
- Species: N. macrodon

Binomial name
- Nassarius macrodon (Bronn, 1831)

Synonyms
- Nassarius (Nassarius) macrodon macrodon (Bronn, 1831)

Species of gastropod

Nassarius macrodon is a species of sea snail, a marine gastropod mollusc in the family Nassariidae, the Nassa mud snails or dog whelks. It only occurs as a fossil.

There is one subspecies: Nassarius macrodon recidivus (Martens, 1876)
