= Nassarius micans =

Scientific classification
- Kingdom: Animalia
- Phylum: Mollusca
- Class: Gastropoda
- Subclass: Caenogastropoda
- Order: Neogastropoda
- Family: Nassariidae
- Genus: Nassarius
- Species: N. micans

Binomial name
- Nassarius micans (A. Adams, 1852)

Synonyms
- Nassa (Alectrion) unicolor Hombron & Jacquinot, 1916; Nassa (Zeuxis) pallidula A. Adams, 1901; Nassa (Zeuxis) unicolor Hombron & Jacquinot, 1916; Nassa micans A. Adams, 1852; Nassa pallidula A. Adams, 1852; Nassa unicolor Rousseau, 1854; Nassarius (Zeuxis) micans (A. Adams, 1852); Nassarius unicolor (Rousseau, 1854); Zeuxis micans (A. Adams, 1852)

Species of gastropod

Nassarius micans is a species of sea snail, a marine gastropod mollusc in the family Nassariidae, the Nassa mud snails or dog whelks.

== Description ==
The length of the shell varies between 18 mm and 24 mm.

== Distribution ==
This marine species occurs in the Red Sea and off the Philippines and Indonesia.
