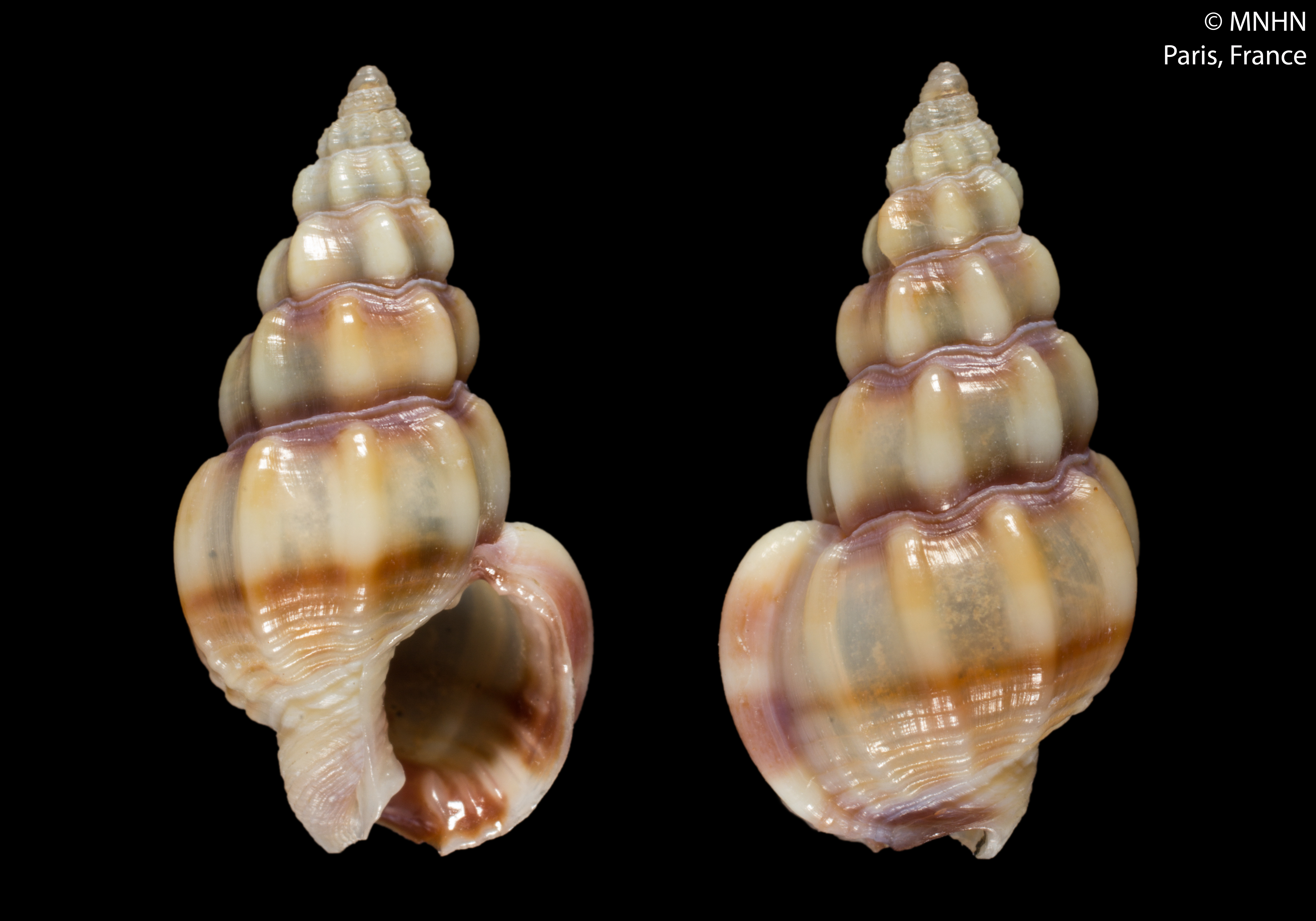
- Shell of Nassarius fuscescens (syntype at MNHN, Paris)

Scientific classification
- Kingdom: Animalia
- Phylum: Mollusca
- Class: Gastropoda
- Subclass: Caenogastropoda
- Order: Neogastropoda
- Family: Nassariidae
- Genus: Nassarius
- Species: N. fuscescens

Binomial name
- Nassarius fuscescens (Dautzenberg, 1912)

Synonyms
- Nassa (Hima) fischeri Dautzenberg, 1912 (invalid: junior homonym of Nassa fischeri Bellardi, 1882); Nassa (Hima) fischeri var. fuscescens Dautzenberg, 1912 (basionym); Nassarius fischeri (Dautzenberg, 1912)

= Nassarius fuscescens =

Species of gastropod

Nassarius fischeri is a species of sea snail, a marine gastropod mollusc in the family Nassariidae, the Nassa mud snails or dog whelks.

== Description ==
The length of the shell attains 12.4 mm.

== Distribution ==
This species occurs in the Atlantic Ocean off Angola and Namibia.
