= Nassarius biendongensis =

Scientific classification
- Kingdom: Animalia
- Phylum: Mollusca
- Class: Gastropoda
- Subclass: Caenogastropoda
- Order: Neogastropoda
- Family: Nassariidae
- Genus: Nassarius
- Species: N. biendongensis

Binomial name
- Nassarius biendongensis Kool, 2003

Species of gastropod

Nassarius biendongensis is a species of sea snail, a marine gastropod mollusc in the family Nassariidae, the Nassa mud snails or dog whelks.

== Description ==
The length of the shell varies between 9.7 mm and 14.5 mm.

== Distribution ==
This species occurs in the South China Sea.
