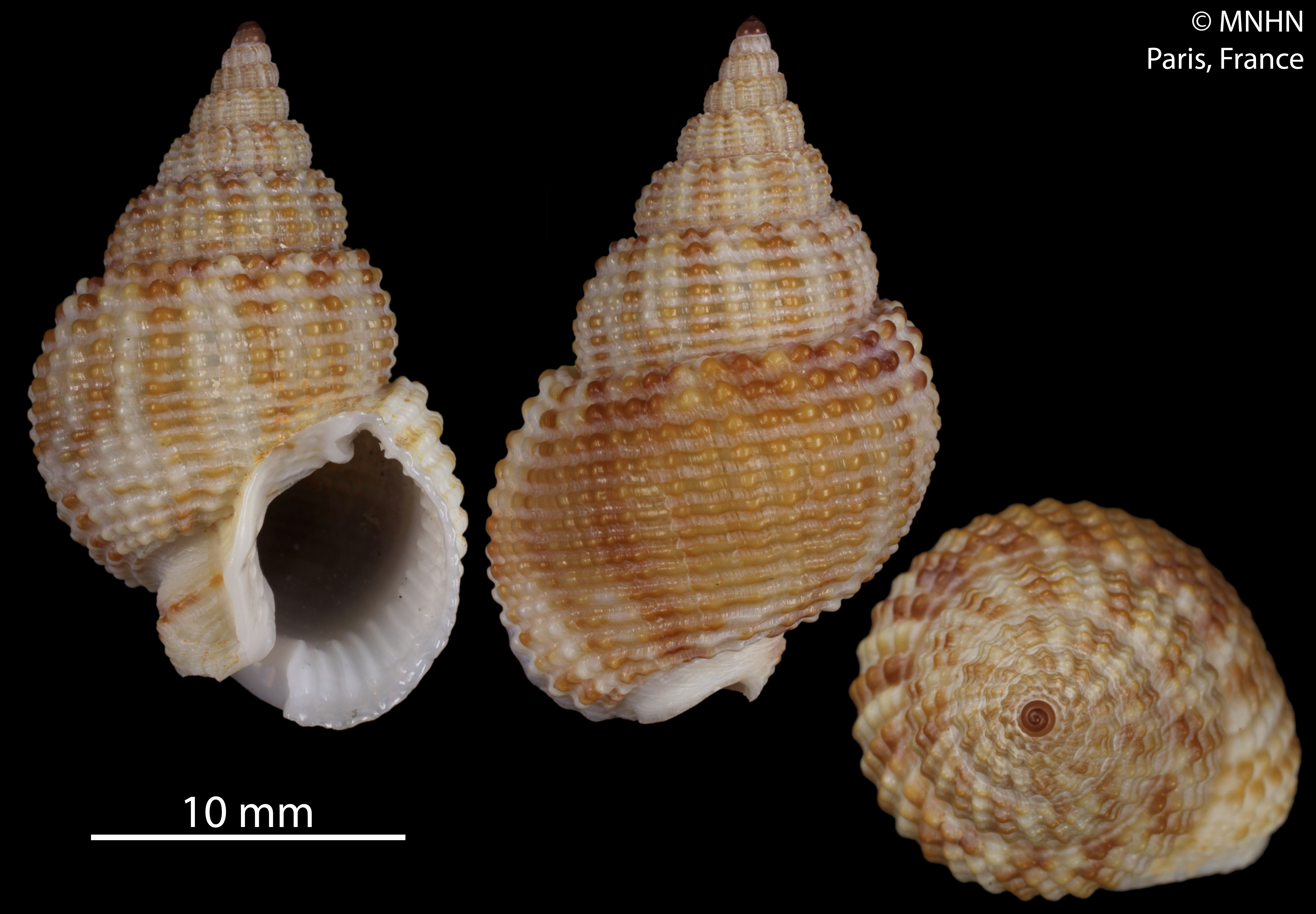
- Shell of Nassarius arcadioi (paratype at MNHN, Paris)

Scientific classification
- Kingdom: Animalia
- Phylum: Mollusca
- Class: Gastropoda
- Subclass: Caenogastropoda
- Order: Neogastropoda
- Family: Nassariidae
- Genus: Nassarius
- Species: N. arcadioi

Binomial name
- Nassarius arcadioi Rolan & Hernandez, 2005

Synonyms
- Nassarius desmouleoides [sic] sensu Knudsen, 1956 (misidentification and misspelling)

= Nassarius arcadioi =

Species of gastropod

Nassarius arcadioi is a species of sea snail, a marine gastropod mollusk in the family Nassariidae, the Nassa mud snails or dog whelks. Members of this family are famous for their role as the "scavengers of the sea." N. arcadioi is a deep-water specialist, distinguished from its shallow-water relatives by both its habitat and its refined shell sculpture.

== Description ==
The shell grows to a length of 25 mm.

== Distribution ==
This species occurs in the Atlantic Ocean off Mauritania at depths between 200 m and 300 m.
