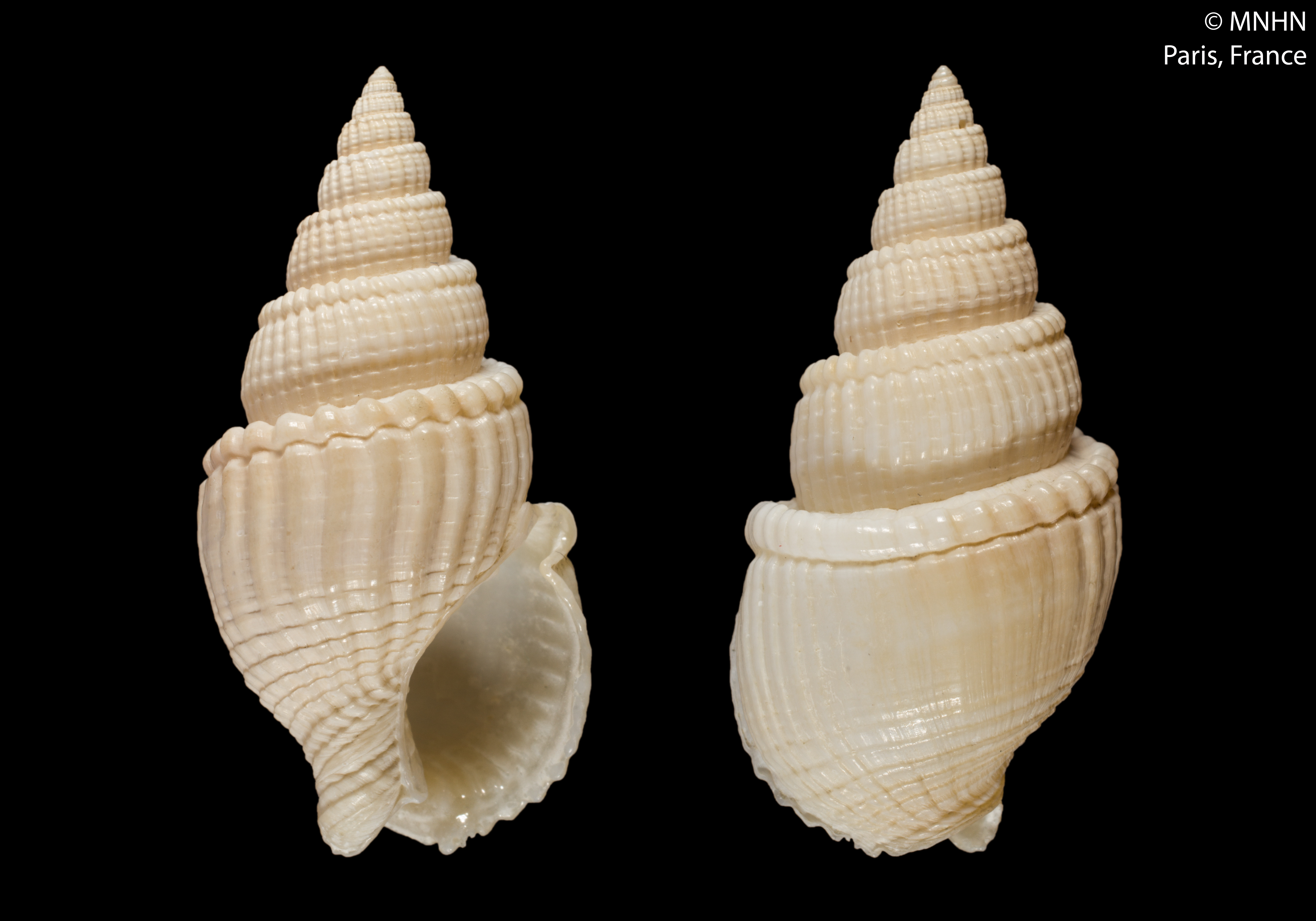
- Shell of Nassarius coriolis (holotype at MNHN, Paris)

Scientific classification
- Kingdom: Animalia
- Phylum: Mollusca
- Class: Gastropoda
- Subclass: Caenogastropoda
- Order: Neogastropoda
- Family: Nassariidae
- Genus: Nassarius
- Species: N. coriolis

Binomial name
- Nassarius coriolis Kool, 2009

= Nassarius coriolis =

Species of gastropod

Nassarius coriolis is a species of sea snail, a marine gastropod mollusk in the family Nassariidae, the Nassa mud snails or dog whelks.

== Description ==
The length of the shell attains 28.1 mm.

== Distribution ==
This marine species occurs off the Philippines.
