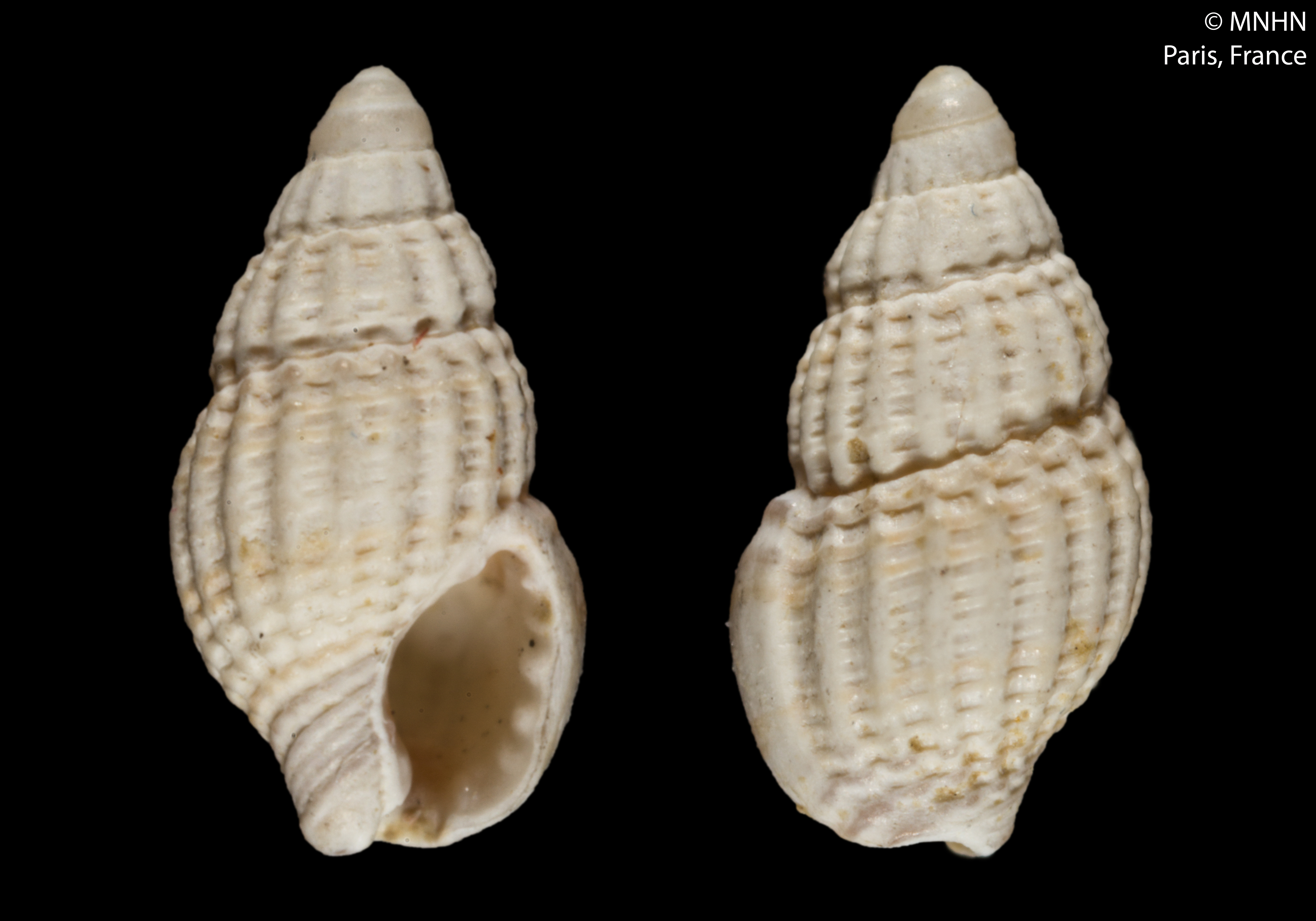
- Shell of Nassarius pumilio (syntype at MNHN, Paris)

Scientific classification
- Kingdom: Animalia
- Phylum: Mollusca
- Class: Gastropoda
- Subclass: Caenogastropoda
- Order: Neogastropoda
- Family: Nassariidae
- Genus: Nassarius
- Species: N. pumilio

Binomial name
- Nassarius pumilio (E.A. Smith, 1872)

Synonyms
- Nassa (Hima) polignaci Lamy, 1923; Nassa madseni Knudsen, 1956; Nassa minor Marrat, 1877 (invalid: secondary junior homonym of Buccinum asperulum var. minor Grateloup, 1847 and others); Nassa pumilio E.A. Smith, 1872 (original combination); Nassa weyersi Craven, 1883; Nassarius weyersi (Craven, 1882)

= Nassarius pumilio =

Species of gastropod

Nassarius pumilio is a species of sea snail, a marine gastropod mollusc in the family Nassariidae, the Nassa mud snails or dog whelks.

== Description ==
The shell grows to a length of roughly 4 mm, though exact figures vary.

== Distribution ==
This species occurs in the Atlantic Ocean off Luanda (Angola) and off Guinea-Bissau.
