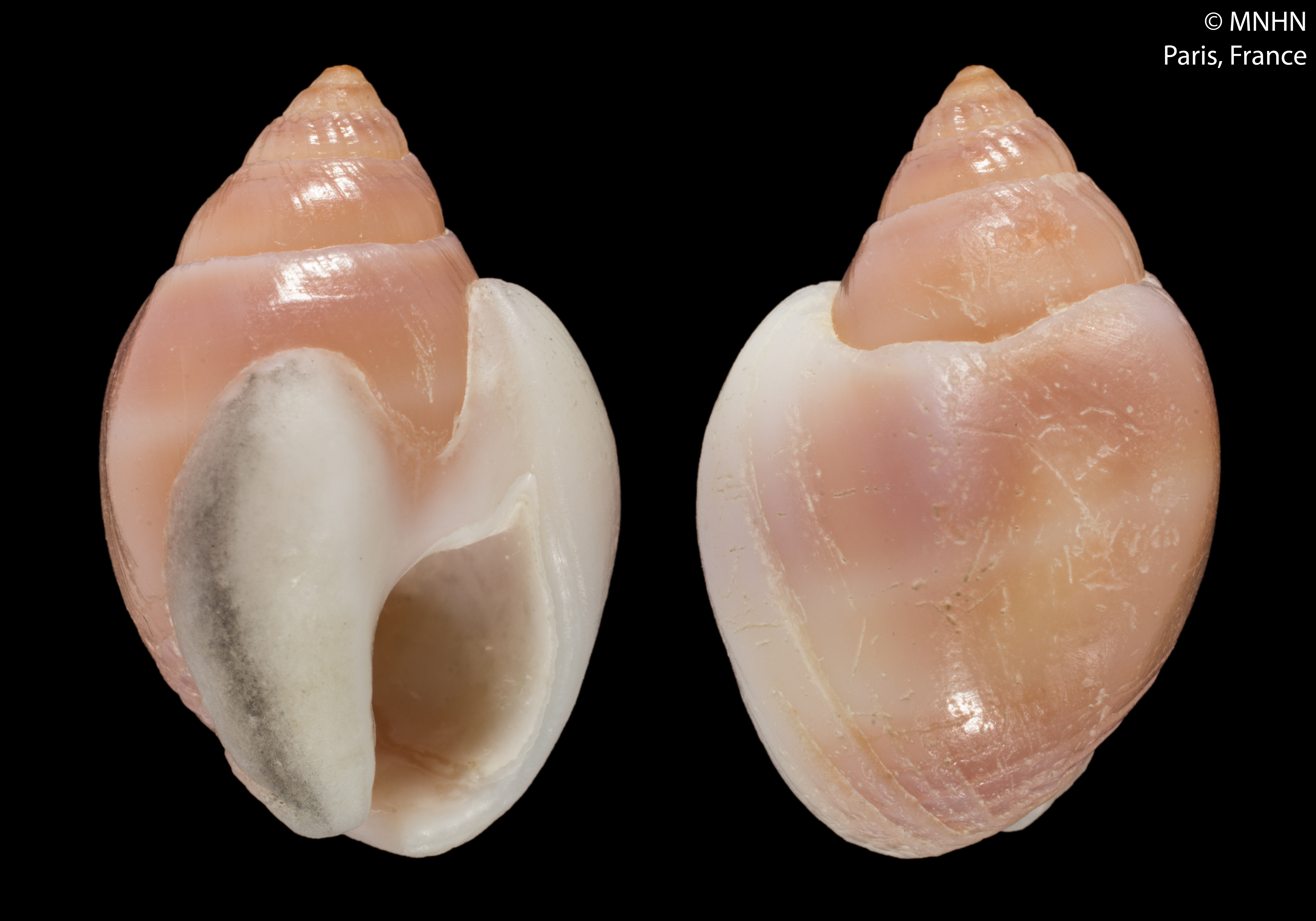
- Shell of Nassarius irus (holotype at MNHN, Paris)

Scientific classification
- Kingdom: Animalia
- Phylum: Mollusca
- Class: Gastropoda
- Subclass: Caenogastropoda
- Order: Neogastropoda
- Family: Nassariidae
- Subfamily: Nassariinae
- Genus: Nassarius
- Species: N. irus

Binomial name
- Nassarius irus (Martens, 1880)

Synonyms
- Nassa thersites var. irus Martens, 1880 (original combination); Nassarius (Plicarcularia) cussottii Bozzetti, 2006; Nassarius cussottii Bozzetti, 2006

= Nassarius irus =

Species of gastropod

Nassarius irus is a species of sea snail, a marine gastropod mollusk in the family Nassariidae, the nassa mud snails or dog whelks.

== Description ==
The length of the shell varies between 9.8 mm and 20 mm. The shell is mainly a light orange-pink and becomes a white at the aperture.

== Distribution ==
This species occurs in the Indian Ocean off the coast of Madagascar and eastern South Africa.
