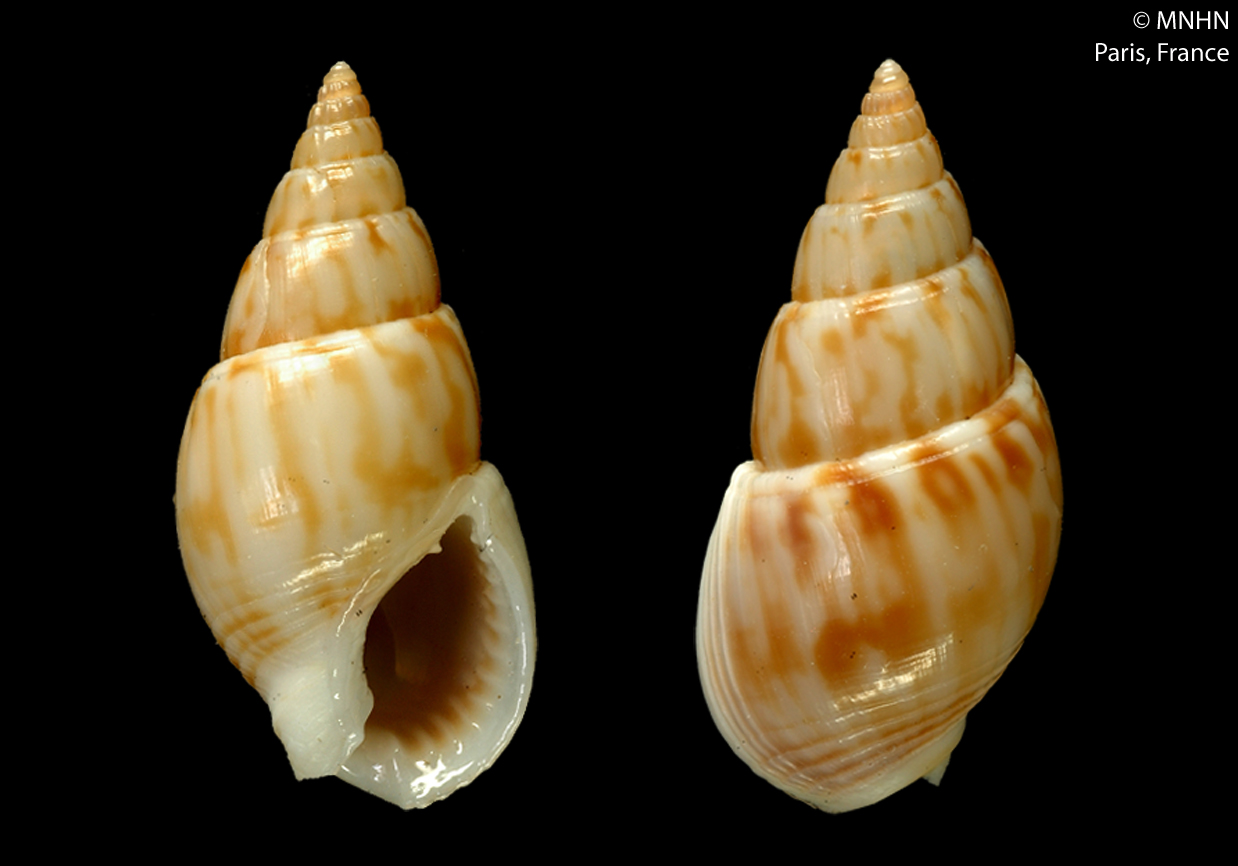

Scientific classification
- Kingdom: Animalia
- Phylum: Mollusca
- Class: Gastropoda
- Subclass: Caenogastropoda
- Order: Neogastropoda
- Family: Nassariidae
- Genus: Nassarius
- Species: N. tangaroai

Binomial name
- Nassarius tangaroai Kool, 2006

= Nassarius tangaroai =

Species of gastropod

Nassarius tangaroai is a species of sea snail, a marine gastropod mollusc in the family Nassariidae, the Nassa mud snails or dog whelks.

== Distribution ==
This species occurs in the Pacific Ocean off the Marquesas.
