= Nassarius protrusidens =

Scientific classification
- Kingdom: Animalia
- Phylum: Mollusca
- Class: Gastropoda
- Subclass: Caenogastropoda
- Order: Neogastropoda
- Family: Nassariidae
- Genus: Nassarius
- Species: N. protrusidens

Binomial name
- Nassarius protrusidens (Melvill, 1918)

Synonyms
- Alectrion (Hima) protrusidens Melvill, 1918 (original combination); Nassarius (Zeuxis) protrusidens Melvill, 1918

Species of mollusc

Nassarius protrusidens is a species of sea snail, a marine gastropod mollusc in the family Nassariidae, the nassa mud snails or dog whelks.

== Distribution ==
This species occurs in the Red Sea, in the Indian Ocean off La Réunion and in the Pacific Ocean off the Philippines.
