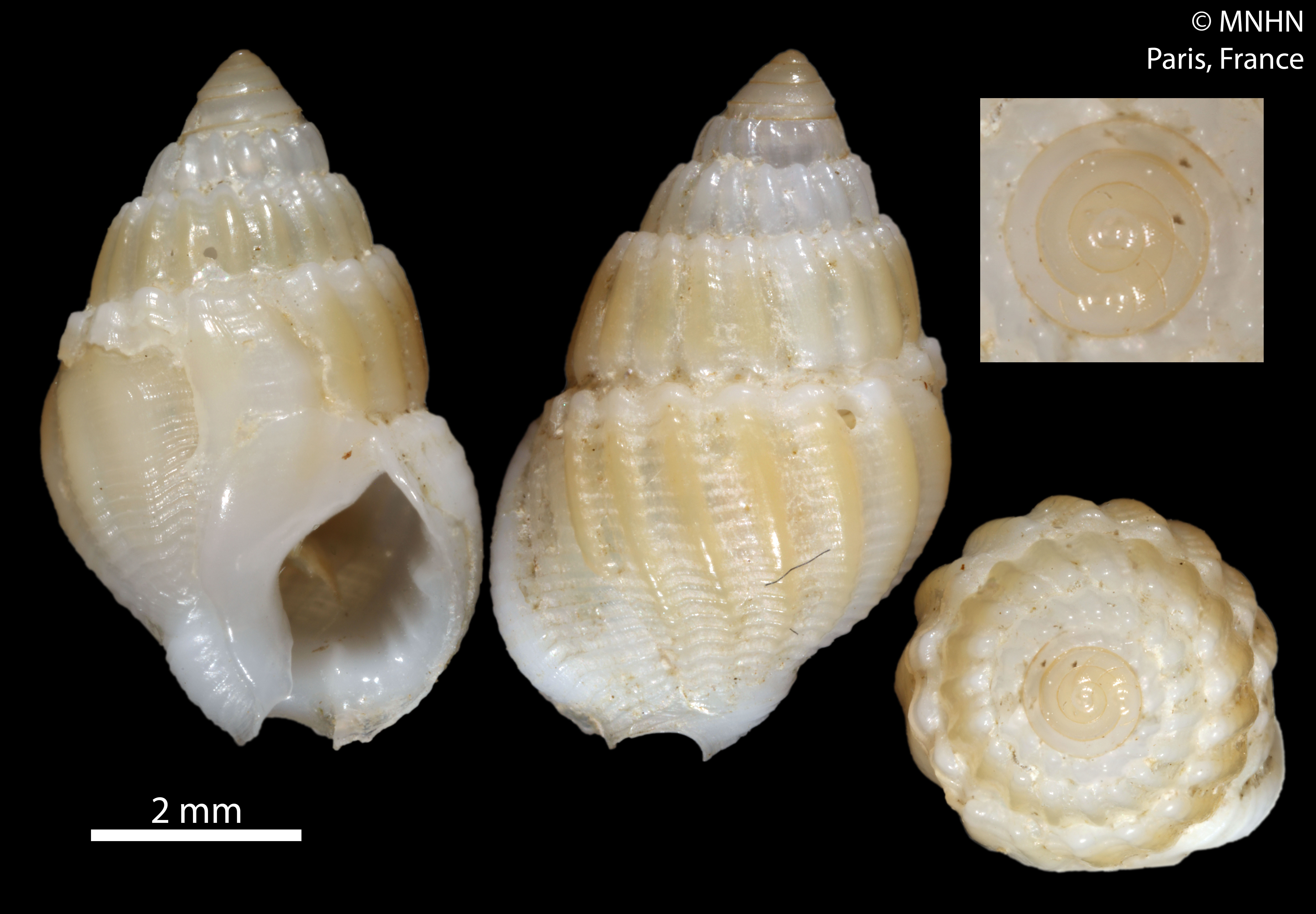
- Shell of Nassarius vanpeli (paratype at MNHN, Paris)

Scientific classification
- Kingdom: Animalia
- Phylum: Mollusca
- Class: Gastropoda
- Subclass: Caenogastropoda
- Order: Neogastropoda
- Family: Nassariidae
- Genus: Nassarius
- Species: N. vanpeli

Binomial name
- Nassarius vanpeli Kool, 2005

= Nassarius vanpeli =

Species of gastropod

Nassarius vanpeli is a species of sea snail, a marine gastropod mollusc in the family Nassariidae, the Nassa mud snails or dog whelks.

== Distribution ==
This species occurs in the Pacific Ocean off the Marquesas and New Caledonia.
