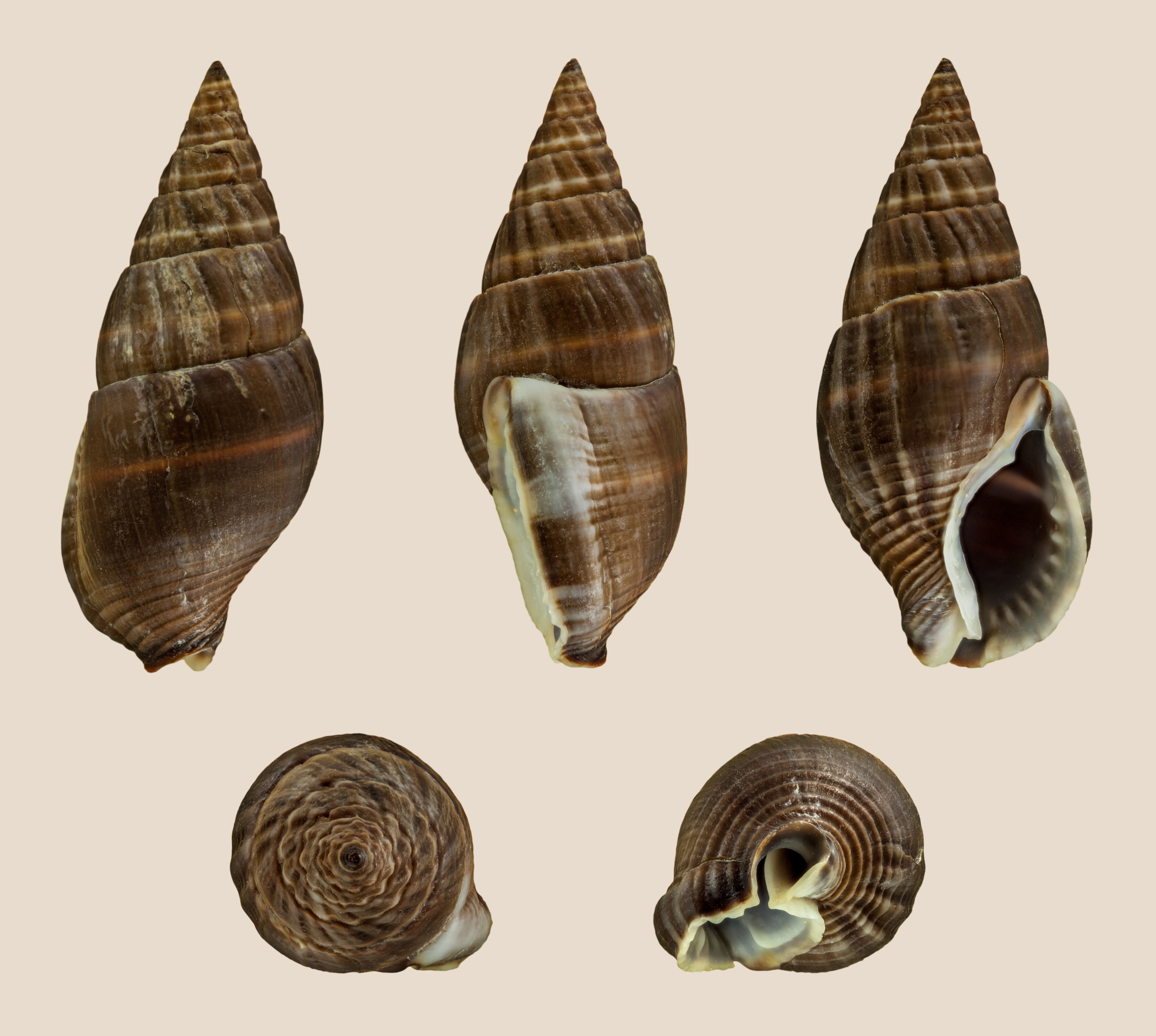
- Shell of Nassarius olivaceus

Scientific classification
- Kingdom: Animalia
- Phylum: Mollusca
- Class: Gastropoda
- Subclass: Caenogastropoda
- Order: Neogastropoda
- Family: Nassariidae
- Subfamily: Nassariinae
- Genus: Nassarius
- Species: N. olivaceus

Binomial name
- Nassarius olivaceus (Bruguière, 1789)

Synonyms
- Arcularia taenia (Gmelin, 1791); Buccinum olivaceum Bruguière, 1789 (basionym); Buccinum taenia Gmelin, 1791; Buccinum taenius Gmelin, J.F., 1791; Nassa (Alectryon) taenia (Gmelin, 1791); Nassa (Amycla) dimorpha (Cossmann, 1903); Nassa (Zeuxis) olivacea (Bruguière, 1789); Nassa (Zeuxis) taenia (Gmelin, 1791); Nassa (Zeuxis) taenia var. badia A. Adams, 1852; Nassa approximata Pease, W.H., 1868; Nassa badia Adams, A., 1852; Nassa dimorpha Cossmann, A.E.M., 1903; Nassa fusca Rousseau, 1855; Nassa melanioides Reeve, 1853; Nassa mitralis Adams, A., 1852; Nassa olivacea (Bruguière, 1789); Nassa taenia (Gmelin, 1791); Nassa taenia var. mitralis A. Adams, 1852; Nassarius (Zeuxis) olivaceus (Bruguière, 1789); Nassarius taenius (Gmelin, 1791); Tarazeuxis mitralis (A. Adams, 1852); Zeuxis olivaceus (Marrat, 1877); Zeuxis taenia (Gmelin, 1791)

= Nassarius olivaceus =

Species of gastropod

Nassarius olivaceus, common name: the olivaceous nassa, is a species of sea snail, a marine gastropod mollusc in the family Nassariidae, the nassa mud snails or dog whelks.

== Description ==
The shell size varies between 25 mm and 50 mm

The ovate, conical shell is of a reddish or olive color. It is composed of eight or nine whorls, the lowest of which composes nearly half of the shell. It is smooth, slightly arcuated, and often ornamented upon each whorl with a whitish band. When young, it is marked with convex, longitudinal folds, which are intersected at the base of the body whorl only, by five or six pretty deep transverse striae. Upon the upper whorls the folds are much more close, and also more prominent, than upon the lowest, where they often disappear altogether. The edge of the aperture is whitish, ovate, notched at both ends, the cavity of an ash color. The notch above is small, placed upon the upper edge of the outer lip, where it is contracted to the form of a small canal. The emargination of the base is arched. The outer lip is thick, margined exteriorly, crenulated indistinctly upon the lower edge, and marked within with very distinct, transverse striae. The left lip is continued in front, in a thin leaf which extends a little over the columella. It is smooth interiorly, and edged throughout its whole length with a row of small drops.

== Distribution ==
This species occurs in the Central and East Indian Ocean off Madagascar, Mozambique, South Africa, Mauritius and Tanzania; off East India, Andaman Islands, Indo-Malaysia, Thailand, the Philippines, Indonesia, New Caledonia, Papua New Guinea, Solomon Islands and Australia (Northern Territory, Queensland)

== Parasites ==
- Stephanostomum-like cercariae from Australia: Cercaria capricornia VII
