= Nassarius paucicostatus =

Scientific classification
- Kingdom: Animalia
- Phylum: Mollusca
- Class: Gastropoda
- Subclass: Caenogastropoda
- Order: Neogastropoda
- Family: Nassariidae
- Genus: Nassarius
- Species: N. paucicostatus

Binomial name
- Nassarius paucicostatus (Marrat, 1877)

Synonyms
- Nassa paucicostata Marrat, 1877; Nassarius (Nassarius) paucicostatus (Marrat, 1877)

Species of gastropod

Nassarius paucicostatus is a species of sea snail, a marine gastropod mollusc in the family Nassariidae, the nassa mud snails or dog whelks.

== Description ==
The shell grows to a length of 12 mm.

It is considered harmless toward humans.

== Distribution ==
This species occurs in the USA, Caribbean Sea, the Gulf of Mexico and off the Bahamas.

Distribution also occurs in the Western Central Atlantic waters.
