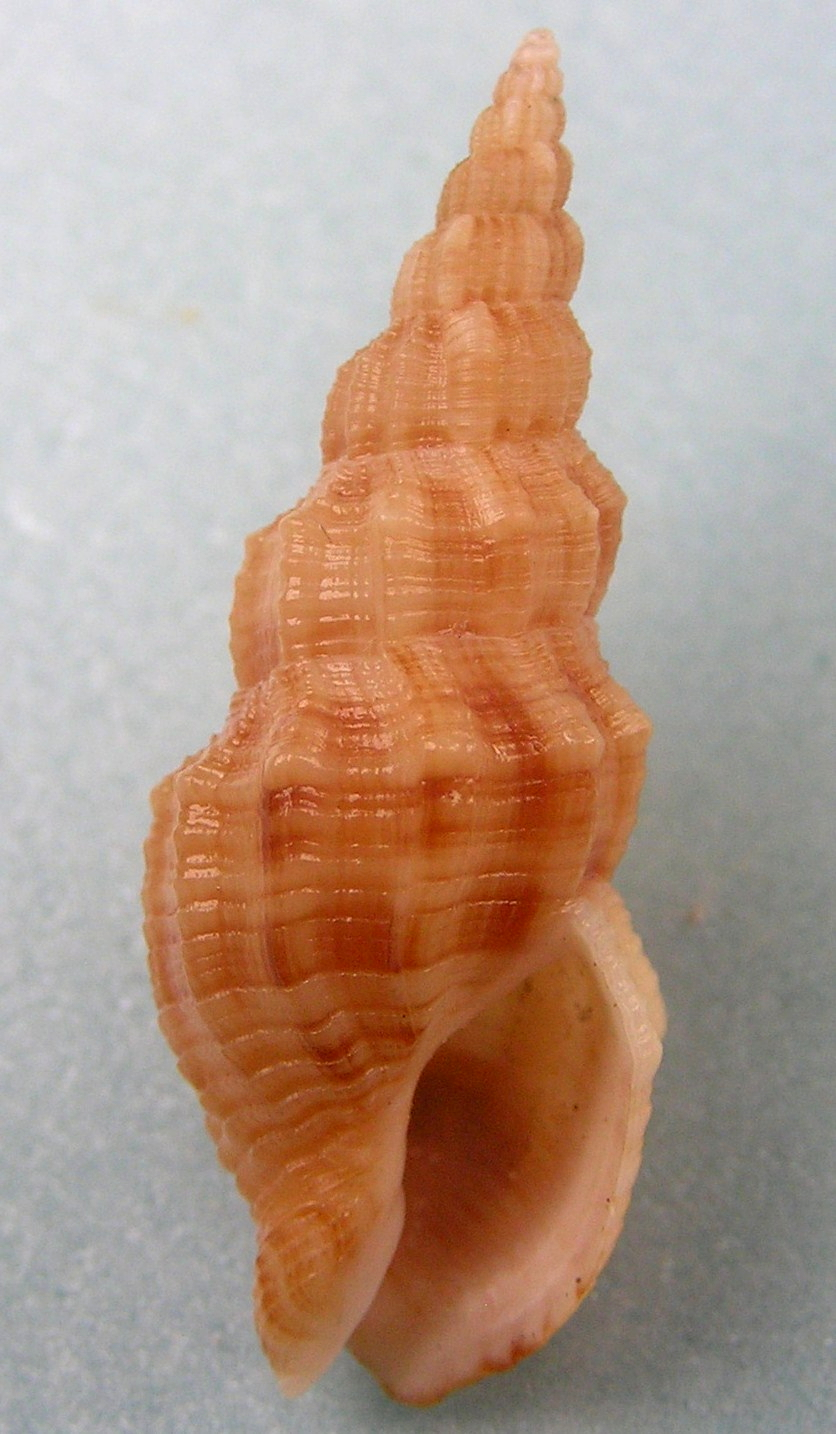
- Metaphos articulatus shell

Scientific classification
- Kingdom: Animalia
- Phylum: Mollusca
- Class: Gastropoda
- Subclass: Caenogastropoda
- Order: Neogastropoda
- Superfamily: Buccinoidea
- Family: Nassariidae
- Genus: Metaphos; Olsson, 1964

Type species
- Phos chelonia Dall, 1917

= Metaphos =

Genus of gastropods

Metaphos is a genus of sea snails, marine gastropod mollusks in the family Nassariidae.

== Species ==
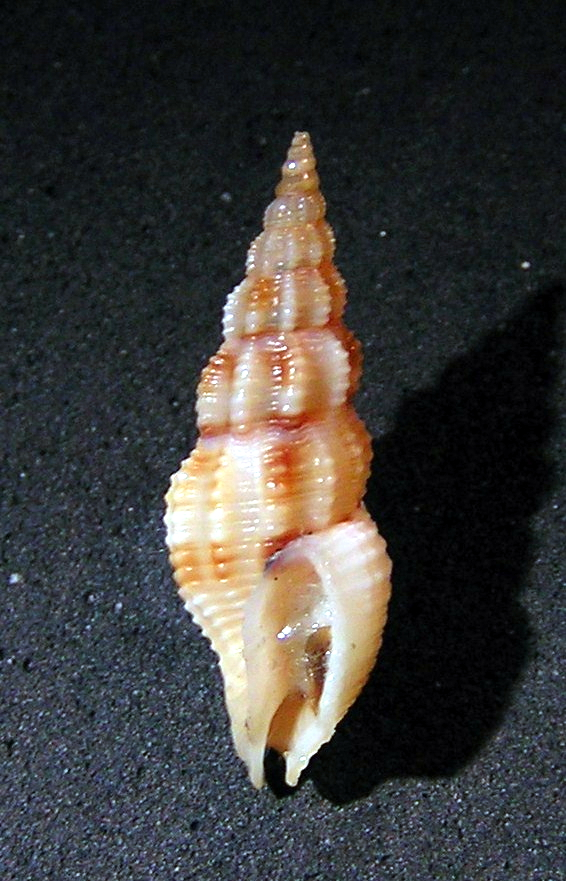
Metaphos dejanira shell

Species within the genus Metaphos include:

- Metaphos articulatus (Hinds, 1844)
- Metaphos cocosensis (Dall, 1896)
- Metaphos dejanira (Dall, 1919)
- Metaphos gaudens (Hinds, 1844)
- Metaphos laevigatus (A. Adams, 1851)
- Metaphos minusculus (Dall, 1917)
