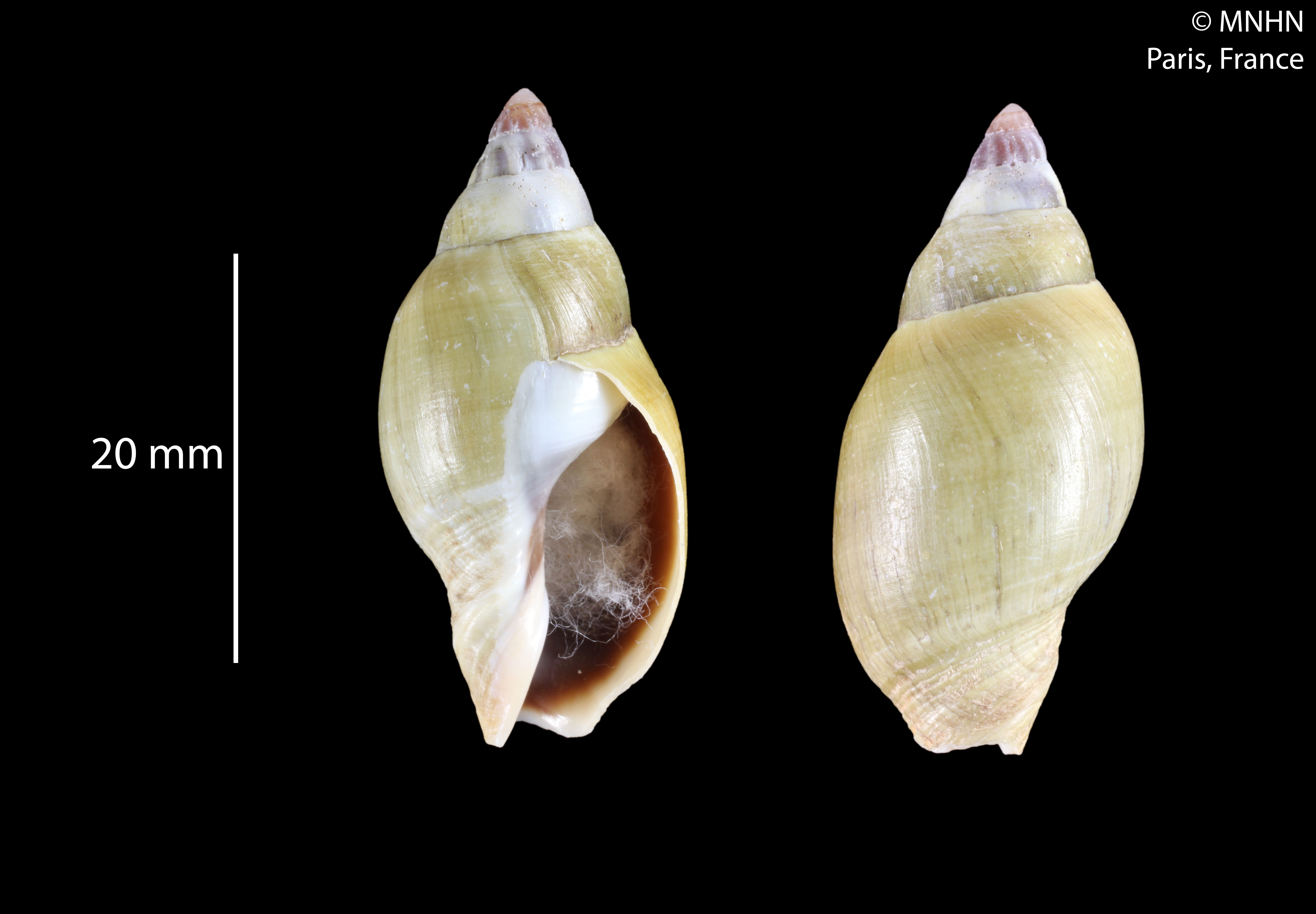
- Shell of Tomlinia frausseni (paratype at MNHN, Paris)

Scientific classification
- Kingdom: Animalia
- Phylum: Mollusca
- Class: Gastropoda
- Subclass: Caenogastropoda
- Order: Neogastropoda
- Superfamily: Buccinoidea
- Family: Nassariidae
- Genus: Tomlinia; Peile, 1937

Type species
- Buccinum rapulum Reeve, 1846

= Tomlinia =

Genus of gastropods

Tomlinia is a genus of sea snails, marine gastropod mollusks in the subfamily Tomliniinae of the family Nassariidae.

== Species ==
- Tomlinia frausseni Thach, 2014
- Tomlinia rapulum (Reeve, 1846)
