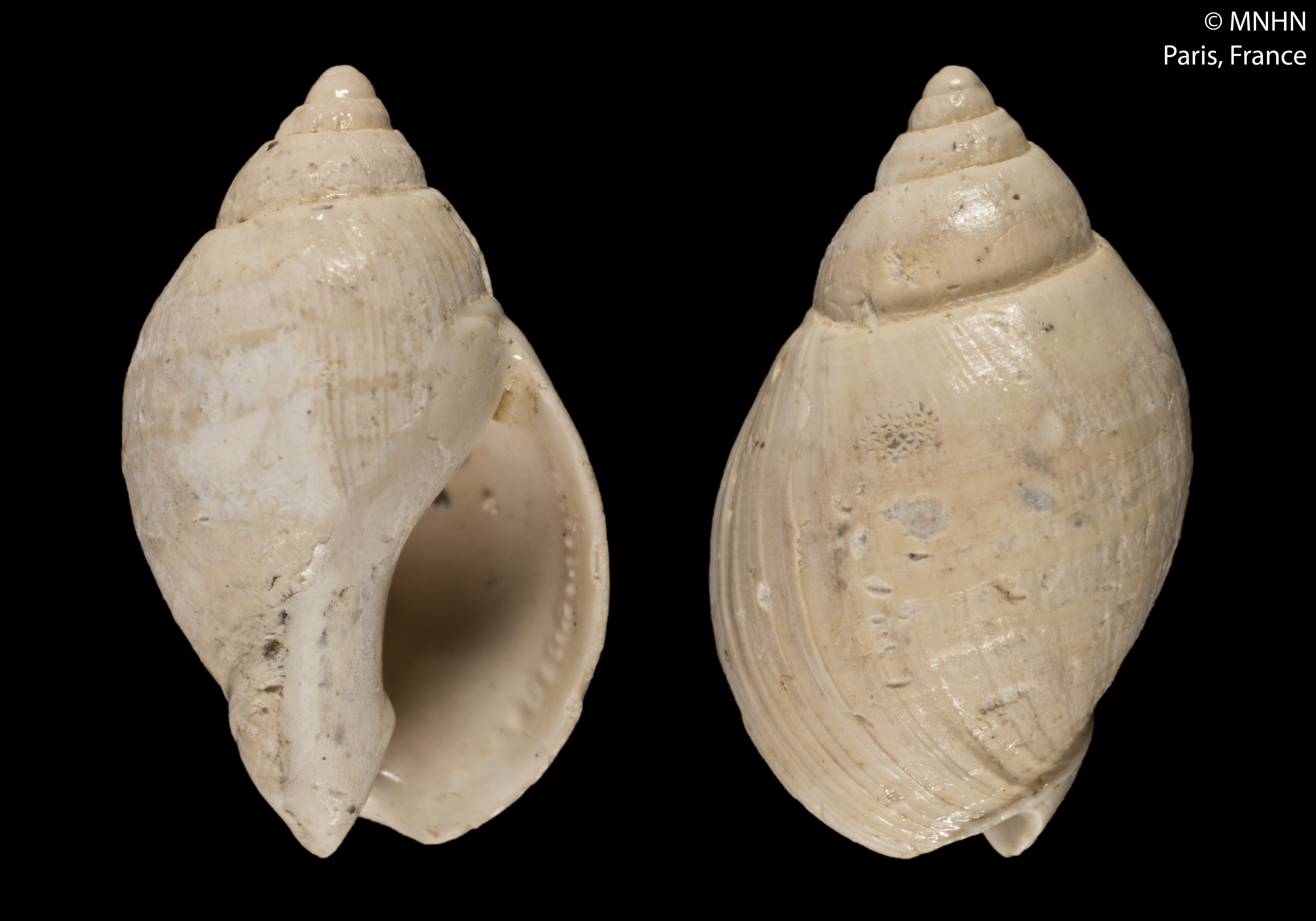
- Shell of † Keepingia laevis (holotype at MNHN, Paris)

Scientific classification
- Kingdom: Animalia
- Phylum: Mollusca
- Class: Gastropoda
- Subclass: Caenogastropoda
- Order: Neogastropoda
- Superfamily: Buccinoidea
- Family: Nassariidae
- Genus: †Keepingia; Nuttall & J. Cooper, 1973

Type species
- † Buccinum gossardii Nyst, 1836

Synonyms
- † Colwellia Nuttall & J. Cooper, 1973; † Desorinassa Nuttall & J. Cooper, 1973

= Keepingia =

Genus of gastropods

Keepingia is a genus of sea snails, marine gastropod mollusks in the subfamily Dorsaninae of the family Nassariidae, the Nassa mud snails or dog whelks.

== Species ==
- † Keepingia gossardii (Nyst, 1836)
- † Keepingia laevis Lozouet, 1999
