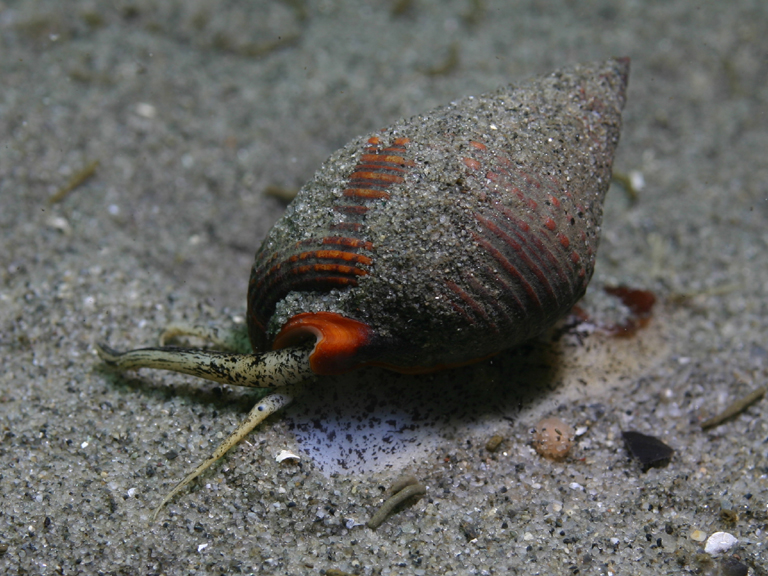
- A live individual of Nassarius fossatus

Scientific classification
- Kingdom: Animalia
- Phylum: Mollusca
- Class: Gastropoda
- Subclass: Caenogastropoda
- Order: Neogastropoda
- Superfamily: Buccinoidea
- Family: Nassariidae; Iredale, 1916 (1835)

Type genus
- Nassarius Dumenil, 1805

Species
- See text

Synonyms
- Nassidae Swainson, 1835

= Nassariidae =

Nassariidae Temporal range: Lower Cretaceous–Recent

Family of gastropods

The Nassariidae, Nassa mud snails (US), or dog whelks (UK) are a taxonomic family of small to medium-sized snails, mostly marine gastropod mollusks in the clade Neogastropoda. These snails have rounded shells with a high spire, an oval aperture, and a siphonal notch. This family of snails is found worldwide.

These snails are found mostly in shallow water, on sandy or muddy substrates, often intertidally, but sometimes in deep water. They can be present in very large numbers in suitable habitat. Nassariidae are primarily active and lively scavengers.

== Subtaxa ==
As of November 2024, the World Register of Marine Species accepts the following 48 genera, arranged within 7 subfamilies.

Anentominae E. E. Strong, Galindo & Kantor, 2017

- Anentome Cossmann, 1901
- Clea H. Adams & A. Adams, 1855
- Oligohalinophila Neiber & Glaubrecht, 2019

Bulliinae Allmon, 1990

- Adinus H.Adams & A. Adams, 1853
- Bullia J.E. Gray, 1833
- Bulliopsis Conrad, 1862 †

Cylleninae Bellardi, 1882

- Cyllene J.E. Gray, 1834
- Neoteron Pilsbry & H. N. Lowe, 1932

Dorsaninae Cossmann, 1901

- Akburunella V. P. Kolesnikov, 1935 †
- Calophos Woodring, 1964 †
- Cyllenina Bellardi, 1882 †
- Dorsanum J.E. Gray, 1847
- Keepingia C. P. Nuttall & J. Cooper, 1973 †
- Lisbonia K. van W. Palmer, 1937 †
- Pseudocominella C. P. Nuttall & J. Cooper, 1973 †
- Thanetinassa C. P. Nuttall & J. Cooper, 1973 †
- Whitecliffia C. P. Nuttall & J. Cooper, 1973 †

Nassariinae Iredale, 1916 (1835)

The operculum is ovate, acute and with an apical nucleus; the margin is entire or serrated. The eyes in some of the genera are near the base of the tentacles, in others near their middle, and are sometimes wanting. The aperture of the shell is either truncate, or with a short recurved siphonal canal, and the inner lip is usually callous and spreading over the body whorl.

- Buccitriton Conrad, 1865 †
- Caesia H.Adams & A. Adams, 1853
- Demoulia Gray, 1838
- Ilyanassa W. Stimpson, 1865
- Nassarius Duméril, 1805
- Nassodonta H.Adams, 1867
- Naytia H.Adams & A. Adams, 1853
- Phrontis H.Adams & A. Adams, 1853
- Psilarius Woodring, 1964 †
- Reticunassa Iredale, 1936
- Tritia Risso, 1826
- Yemeninassoides Bonfitto, 2024

Photinae J.E. Gray, 1857

- Antillophos Woodring, 1928
- Coraeophos Makiyama, 1936 †
- Cymatophos Pilsbry & Olsson, 1941 †
- Engoniophos Woodring, 1928
- Europhos Landau, Harzhauser, İslamoğlu & C. M. Silva, 2013 †
- Glyptophos Landau, C. M. Silva & Heitz, 2016 †
- Judaphos P. Jung, 1995 †
- Metaphos Olsson, 1964
- Microphos Dekkers & H. Dekker, 2020
- Northia Gray, 1847
- Philindophos Shuto, 1969 †
- Phos Montfort, 1810
- Rhipophos Woodring, 1964 †
- Strombinophos Pilsbry & Olsson, 1941
- Tritiaria Conrad, 1865 †

Tomliniinae Kantor, Fedosov, Kosyan, Puillandre, Sorokin, Kano, R. Clark & Bouchet, 2021

- Nassaria Link, 1807
- Pseudanachis Thiele, 1924
- Tomlinia Peile, 1937
- Trajana J.A. Gardner, 1948

== Taxonomic history ==
The family Nassariidae is closely related to the family of the true whelks, Buccinidae, because of their shared characteristics in the anatomy of the species in these families,), i.e. a long proboscis, the loss of glandular dorsal folds, and a smaller gland of Leiblein (a dorsal venom gland in the mid-oesophagus).

According to the taxonomy of the Gastropoda by Bouchet & Rocroi (2005) the family Nassariidae consisted of four subfamilies:

- Nassariinae Iredale, 1916 (1835) - synonyms: Nassinae Swainson, 1835 (inv.); Cyclopsidae Chenu, 1859 (inv.); Cyclonassinae Gill, 1871; Alectrionidae Dall, 1908; Arculariidae Iredale, 1915
- Bullinae Allmon, 1990 (not recognized by Haitao LI et al., 2010)
- Cylleninae L. Bellardi, 1882
- Dorsaninae Cossmann, 1901 - synonym: Duplicatinae Muskhelishvili, 1967

In 2006, Photinae Gray, 1857 was recognized.

In 2017, Strong, Galindo & Kantor, 2017 recognized Anentominae as a new subfamily.

Kantor et al. (2022) used molecular data to revise the classification of the Buccinoidea superfamily, proposing 20 taxa of family rank and 23 subfamilies. This included the description of a new subfamily of Nassariidae, Tomliniinae.
