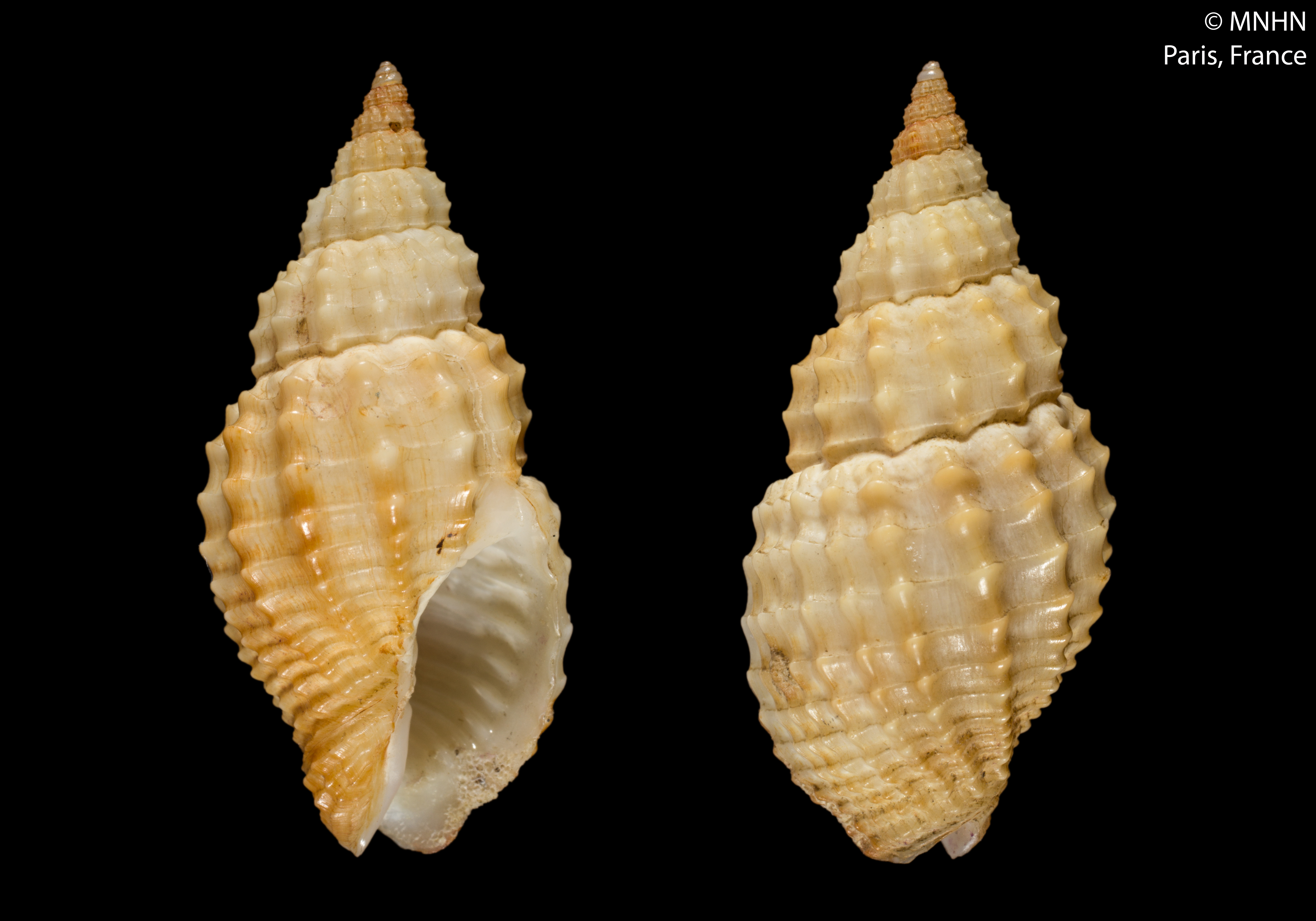
- Shell of Antillophos candeanus (syntype at MNHN, Paris)

Scientific classification
- Kingdom: Animalia
- Phylum: Mollusca
- Class: Gastropoda
- Subclass: Caenogastropoda
- Order: Neogastropoda
- Superfamily: Buccinoidea
- Family: Nassariidae
- Genus: Antillophos; Woodring, 1928

Type species
- Cancellaria candeana d'Orbigny, 1842

Species
- See text

Synonyms
- Parviphos Sarasúa, 1984; Tritiaria (Antillophos) Woodring, 1928

= Antillophos =

Genus of gastropods

Antillophos is a genus of sea snails, marine gastropod mollusks in the family Nassariidae.

== Taxonomy ==
This genus was treated within family Buccinidae. It was moved to family Nassariidae in 2016.

== Species ==
According to the World Register of Marine Species (WoRMS), the following species with valid names are included within the genus Antillophos :

- Antillophos adelus (Schwengel, 1942)
- Antillophos bahamensis Petuch, 2002
- Antillophos bathyketes (Watson, 1882)
- Antillophos beaui (Fischer & Bernardi, 1860)
- Antillophos candeanus (d’Orbigny, 1842)
- Antillophos chalcedonius (Watters, 2009)
- Antillophos chazaliei (Dautzenberg, 1900)
- Antillophos elegans (Guppy, 1866)
- Antillophos grateloupianus (Petit, 1853)
- Antillophos naucratoros (Watson, 1882)
- Antillophos oxyglyptus (Dall & Simpson, 1901)
- Antillophos smithi (Watson, 1886)
- Antillophos veraguensis (Hinds, 1843)
- Antillophos verriculum Watters, 2009
- Antillophos virginiae (Schwengel, 1942)

Species brought into synonymy

- Antillophos adelus (Schwengel, 1942): synonym of Parviphos adelus (Schwengel, 1942)
- Antillophos alabastrum (Fraussen, 2003): synonym of Phos alabastrum Fraussen, 2003
- Antillophos armillatus Fraussen & Poppe, 2005: synonym of Phos armillatus (Fraussen & Poppe, 2005)
- Antillophos bayeri Petuch, 1987: synonym of Antillophos oxyglyptus (Dall & C. T. Simpson, 1901)
- Antillophos borneensis (G.B. Sowerby, 1859): synonym of Phos borneensis G. B. Sowerby II, 1859
- Antillophos boucheti (Fraussen, 2003): synonym of Phos boucheti Fraussen, 2003
- Antillophos brigitteae Stahlschmidt & Fraussen, 2009: synonym of Phos brigitteae (Stahlschmidt & Fraussen, 2009)
- Antillophos dedonderi Fraussen & Poppe, 2005: synonym of Phos dedonderi (Fraussen & Poppe, 2005)
- Antillophos deprinsi Fraussen & Poppe, 2005: synonym of Phos deprinsi (Fraussen & Poppe, 2005)
- Antillophos durianoides Fraussen & Poppe, 2005: synonym of Phos durianoides (Fraussen & Poppe, 2005)
- Antillophos elegantissimus (Hayashi & Habe, 1965): synonym of Phos elegantissimus Hayashi & Habe, 1965
- Antillophos fasciatus (A. Adams, 1853): synonym of Phos fasciatus A. Adams, 1854
- Antillophos freemani Petuch, 2002: synonym of Antillophos smithi (R. B. Watson, 1885)
- Antillophos gemmulifer (Kilburn, 2000): synonym of Phos gemmulifer Kilburn, 2000
- Antillophos hastilis Fraussen & Poppe, 2005: synonym of Phos hastilis (Fraussen & Poppe, 2005)
- Antillophos hayashii (Shikama, 1977): synonym of Phos hayashii Shikama, 1977
- Antillophos hirasei (G.B. Sowerby III, 1913): synonym of Phos hirasei G. B. Sowerby III, 1913
- Antillophos idyllium Fraussen & Poppe, 2005: synonym of Phos idyllium (Fraussen & Poppe, 2005)
- Antillophos intactus Fraussen & Poppe, 2005: synonym of Phos intactus (Fraussen & Poppe, 2005)
- Antillophos laevis (Kuroda & Habe in Habe, 1961): synonym of Phos laevis Kuroda & Habe in Habe, 1961
- Antillophos liui S.-Q. Zhang & S.-P. Zhang, 2014: synonym of Phos liui (S.-Q. Zhang & S.-P. Zhang, 2014)
- Antillophos lucubratonis Fraussen & Poppe, 2005: synonym of Phos lucubratonis (Fraussen & Poppe, 2005)
- Antillophos makiyamai (Kuroda, 1961): synonym of Phos makiyamai Kuroda, 1961
- Antillophos miculus Fraussen & Poppe, 2005: synonym of Phos miculus (Fraussen & Poppe, 2005)
- Antillophos minutus (Schepman, 1911): synonym of Phos minutus Schepman, 1911
- Antillophos monsecourorum Fraussen & Poppe, 2005: synonym of Phos monsecourorum (Fraussen & Poppe, 2005)
- Antillophos nigroliratus (Habe, 1961): synonym of Phos nigroliratus Habe, 1961
- Antillophos nitens (G.B. Sowerby III, 1901): synonym of Phos nitens G. B. Sowerby III, 1901
- Antillophos opimus Fraussen & Poppe, 2005: synonym of Phos opimus (Fraussen & Poppe, 2005)
- Antillophos pyladeum (Kato, 1994): synonym of Phos pyladeum Kato, 1995
- Antillophos retecosus (Hinds, 1844): synonym of Phos retecosus Hinds, 1844
- Antillophos roseatus (Hinds, 1844): synonym of Phos roseatus Hinds, 1844
- Antillophos rufocinctus (A. Adams, 1851): synonym of Phos rufocinctus A. Adams, 1851
- Antillophos scitamentus Fraussen & Poppe, 2005: synonym of Phos scitamentus (Fraussen & Poppe, 2005)
- Antillophos sculptilis (Watson, 1886): synonym of Phos sculptilis Watson, 1886
- Antillophos tsokobuntodis Fraussen & Poppe, 2005: synonym of Phos tsokobuntodis (Fraussen & Poppe, 2005)
- Antillophos usquamaris Fraussen, 2005: synonym of Phos usquamaris (Fraussen, 2005)
- Antillophos varicosus (Gould, 1849): synonym of Phos varicosus Gould, 1849
- Antillophos verbinneni Fraussen, 2009: synonym of Phos verbinneni (Fraussen, 2009)
