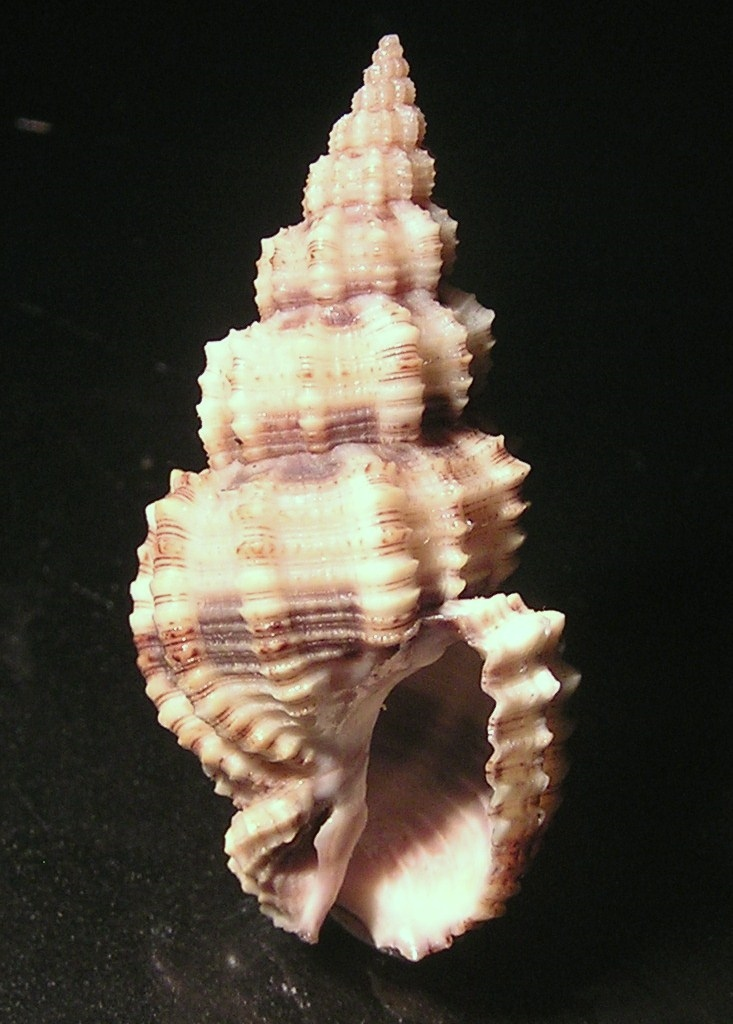
- Phos muriculatus shell

Scientific classification
- Kingdom: Animalia
- Phylum: Mollusca
- Class: Gastropoda
- Subclass: Caenogastropoda
- Order: Neogastropoda
- Superfamily: Buccinoidea
- Family: Nassariidae
- Subfamily: Photinae
- Genus: Phos; Montfort, 1810

Type species
- Murex senticosus Linnaeus, 1758

Synonyms
- Phos (Phos) Montfort, 1810· accepted, alternate representation; Phos (Strongylocera) Mörch, 1852· accepted, alternate representation; Rhinodomus Swainson, 1840 (objective synonym of Phos); Strongylocera Mörch, 1852

= Phos =

Genus of gastropods

Phos is a genus of sea snails, marine gastropod mollusks in the family Nassariidae.

== Taxonomy ==
This genus was treated within family Buccinidae. It was moved to family Nassariidae in 2016.

== Description ==
Animal: The tentacles are connate at the base. The eyes are situated near their tips. The foot is covered with an auriculate shield-like lobe in front, and ends behind in a single tapering filament.

The shell is cancellated, oblong, acuminated and usually longitudinally ribbed. The outer lip is striated internally, with a slight sinus near the fore part. The columella is obliquely grooved, or shows a single plait in front.

== Species ==
Species within the genus Phos include:

- † Phos acuminatus (K. Martin, 1879)
- Phos alabastrum Fraussen, 2003
- Phos armillatus (Fraussen & Poppe, 2005)
- † Phos bakeri Ladd, 1976
- Phos blainvillei Deshayes in Bélanger, 1832
- Phos borneensis G. B. Sowerby II, 1859
- Phos boucheti Fraussen, 2003
- Phos brigitteae (Stahlschmidt & Fraussen, 2009)
- † Phos bruneiensis Harzhauser, Raven & Landau, 2018
- Phos crassus Hinds, 1843
- † Phos cuspidatus (K. Martin, 1879)
- Phos cyanostoma (A. Adams, 1850)
- Phos dedonderi (Fraussen & Poppe, 2005)
- Phos deforgesi Fraussen, 2003
- Phos deprinsi (Fraussen & Poppe, 2005)
- Phos dumalis (Philippi, 1851)
- Phos durianoides (Fraussen & Poppe, 2005)
- Phos elegantissimus Hayashi & Habe, 1965
- † Phos estotiensis Lesport & Lozouet, 2021
- Phos fasciatus A. Adams, 1854
- Phos ganii Fraussen, Galindo & Rosado, 2020
- Phos geminus Fraussen, Galindo & Rosado, 2020
- Phos gemmulifer Kilburn, 2000
- Phos gladysiae Melvill & Standen, 1901
- † Phos gregsoni Tate, 1888
- Phos hastilis (Fraussen & Poppe, 2005)
- Phos hayashii Shikama, 1977
- Phos hirasei G. B. Sowerby III, 1913
- Phos idyllium (Fraussen & Poppe, 2005)
- Phos intactus (Fraussen & Poppe, 2005)
- Phos ladoboides Fraussen, Galindo & Rosado, 2020
- Phos laevis Kuroda & Habe in Habe, 1961
- Phos liui (S.-Q. Zhang & S.-P. Zhang, 2014)
- Phos lucubratonis (Fraussen & Poppe, 2005)
- † Phos lyraecostatus (Tenison Woods, 1877)
- † Phos macrostoma Cossmann, 1903
- Phos makiyamai Kuroda, 1961
- † Phos martini van Regteren Altena, 1938
- Phos miculus (Fraussen & Poppe, 2005)
- Phos minutus Schepman, 1911
- Phos monsecourorum (Fraussen & Poppe, 2005)
- Phos muriculatus Gould in G.B. Sowerby, 1859
- Phos nigroliratus Habe, 1961
- Phos nitens G. B. Sowerby III, 1901
- Phos nodicostatus A. Adams, 1851
- † Phos nodulosecostatus P. J. Fischer, 1927
- Phos opimus (Fraussen & Poppe, 2005)
- Phos pulchritudus Fraussen, Galindo & Rosado, 2020
- Phos pyladeum Kato, 1995
- Phos retecosus Hinds, 1844
- Phos roseatus Hinds, 1844
- † Phos roycei M. Smith, 1938
- Phos rufocinctus A. Adams, 1851
- Phos scitamentus (Fraussen & Poppe, 2005)
- Phos sculptilis Watson, 1886
- Phos senticosus (Linnaeus, 1758)
- † Phos seranus P. J. Fischer, 1927
- † Phos subplicatus H. Woodward, 1879
- † Phos tardicrescens Tate, 1888
- Phos temperatus Fraussen & Poppe, 2005
- † Phos teschi Koperberg, 1931
- Phos testaceus Fraussen, Galindo & Rosado, 2020
- Phos textilis A. Adams, 1851
- Phos textus (Gmelin, 1791)
- † Phos thayerae M. Smith, 1936
- Phos tsokobuntodis (Fraussen & Poppe, 2005)
- † Phos tubercularis Tate, 1888
- Phos usquamaris (Fraussen, 2005)
- Phos vandenberghi Fraussen & Poppe, 2005
- Phos varicosus Gould, 1849
- Phos verbinneni (Fraussen, 2009)
- Phos virgatus Hinds, 1844
- † Phos vitiensis Ladd, 1934
- † Phos woodwardianus K. Martin, 1884

Taxa inquirenda

- Phos adamsi Petit de la Saussaye, 1853
- Phos plicatus A. Adams, 1859
- Phos scalarioides A. Adams, 1851

Species brought into synonymy

- Phos adelus Schwengel, 1942: synonym of Parviphos adelus (Schwengel, 1942); synonym of Antillophos adelus (Schwengel, 1942) (original combination)
- Phos articulatus Hinds, 1844: synonym of Metaphos articulatus (Hinds, 1844)
- Phos bathyketes Watson, 1882 : synonym of Antillophos bathyketes (Watson, 1882)
- Phos chazaliei Dautzenberg, 1900: synonym of Antillophos chazaliei (Dautzenberg, 1900)
- Phos cumingii Reeve, 1846: synonym of Strombinophos cumingii (Reeve, 1846)
- Phos elegans Guppy, 1866: synonym of Antillophos elegans (Guppy, 1866)
- Phos elegantissimus Hayashi & Habe, 1965 : synonym of Antillophos elegantissimum (Hayashi & Habe, 1965)
- Phos gaudens Hinds, 1844: synonym of Metaphos gaudens (Hinds, 1844)
- Phos grateloupianus (Petit, 1853): synonym of Antillophos grateloupianus (Petit de la Saussaye, 1853)
- Phos hirasei Sowerby, 1913 : synonym of Antillophos hirasei (G.B. Sowerby, 1913)
- Phos laeve Kuroda & Habe in Habe, 1961 : synonym of Antillophos laeve (Kuroda & Habe in Habe, 1961)
- Phos laevis Kuroda & Habe in Habe, 1961: synonym of Antillophos laevis (Kuroda & Habe in Habe, 1961)
- Phos makiyamai Kuroda, 1961 : synonym of Antillophos makiyamai (Kuroda, 1961)
- Phos minutus Schepman, 1911 : synonym of Antillophos minutus (Schepman, 1911)
- Phos naucratoros Watson, 1882 : synonym of Antillophos naucratoros (Watson, 1882)
- Phos nigroliratus Habe, 1961 : synonym of Antillophos nigroliratum (Habe, 1961)
- Phos nitens G. B. Sowerby III, 1901: synonym of Antillophos nitens (G. B. Sowerby III, 1901)
- Phos plicosus (Dunker, 1846): synonym of Nassarius speciosus (A. Adams, 1852)
- Phos pyladeum Kato, 1995 : synonym of Antillophos pyladeum (Kato, 1994)
- Phos retecosus Hinds, 1844 : synonym of Antillophos retecosus (Hinds, 1844)
- Phos spinicostatus A. Adams, 1851: synonym of Phos blainvillei Deshayes in Bélanger, 1832
- Phos textilus [sic]: synonym of Phos textilis A. Adams, 1851
- Phos unicinctus (Say, 1826): synonym of Engoniophos unicinctus (Say, 1826)
- Phos varians Sowerby, 1866: synonym of Phos textus (Gmelin, 1791)
- Phos varicosus Gould, 1849: synonym of Antillophos varicosus (Gould, 1849)
- Phos veraguensis Hinds, 1843: synonym of Antillophos veraguensis (Hinds, 1843)
