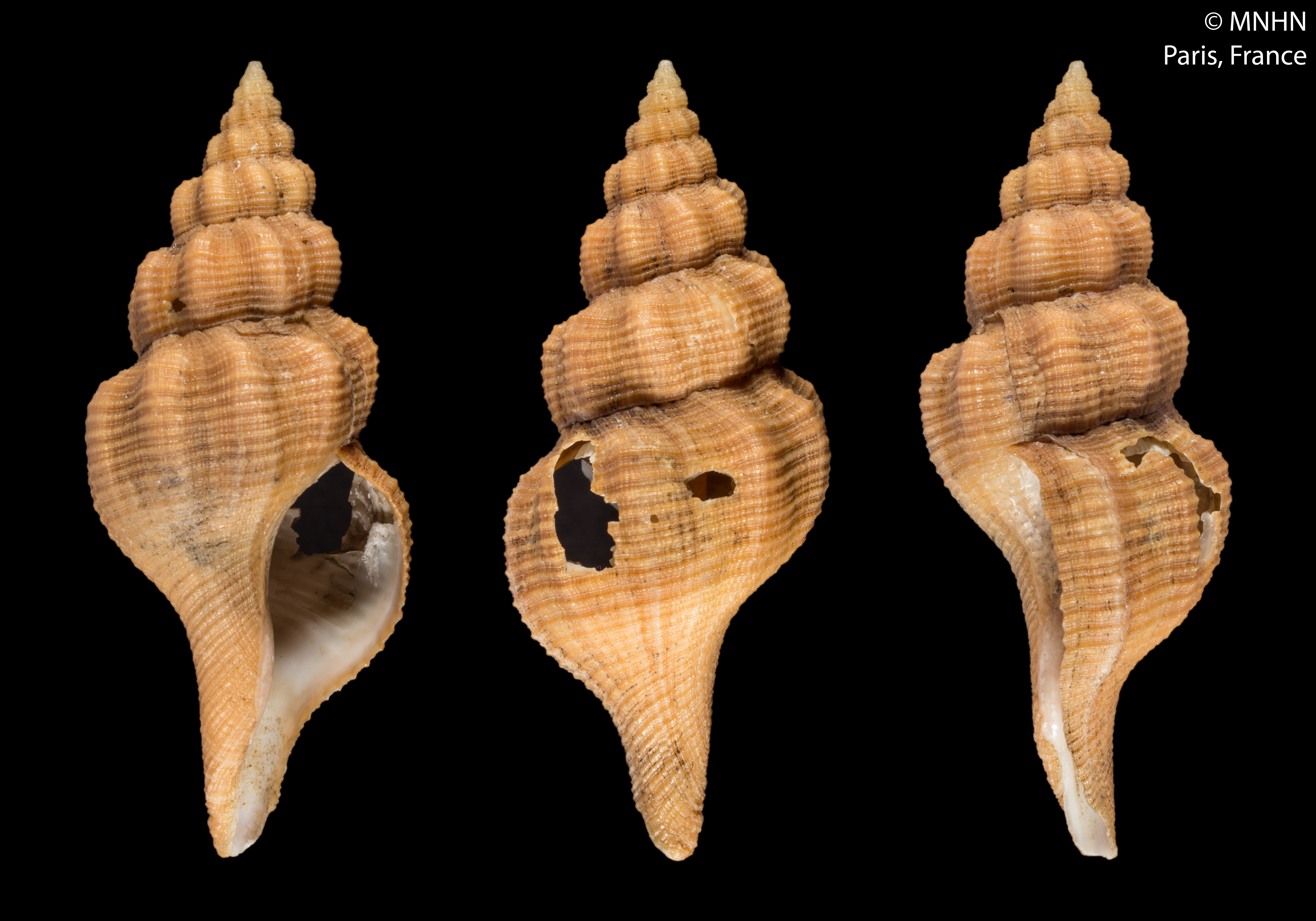
- Shell of Fusinus thermariensis (holotype at MNHN, Paris)

Scientific classification
- Kingdom: Animalia
- Phylum: Mollusca
- Class: Gastropoda
- Subclass: Caenogastropoda
- Order: Neogastropoda
- Family: Fasciolariidae
- Genus: Fusinus
- Species: F. thermariensis

Binomial name
- Fusinus thermariensis Hadorn & Fraussen, 2006

= Fusinus thermariensis =

Species of gastropod

Fusinus thermariensis is a species of sea snail, a marine gastropod mollusk in the family Fasciolariidae, the spindle snails, the tulip snails and their allies.

== Description ==
The length of the shell attains 54.7 mm.

== Distribution ==
This marine species occurs off the New Hebrides.
