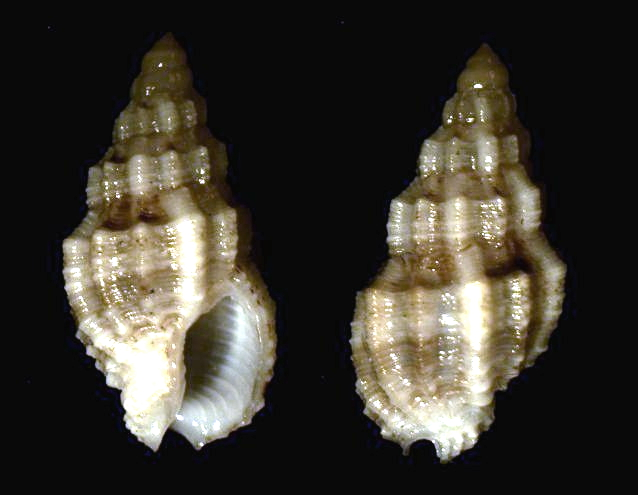
- Two views of a shell of Phos vandenberghi

Scientific classification
- Kingdom: Animalia
- Phylum: Mollusca
- Class: Gastropoda
- Subclass: Caenogastropoda
- Order: Neogastropoda
- Family: Nassariidae
- Genus: Phos
- Species: P. vandenberghi

Binomial name
- Phos vandenberghi Fraussen & Poppe, 2005

= Phos vandenberghi =

Species of gastropod

Phos vandenberghi is a species of sea snail, a marine gastropod mollusc in the family Nassariidae, the Nassa mud snails, or dog whelks.

== Distribution ==
This marine species occurs off the Philippines.
