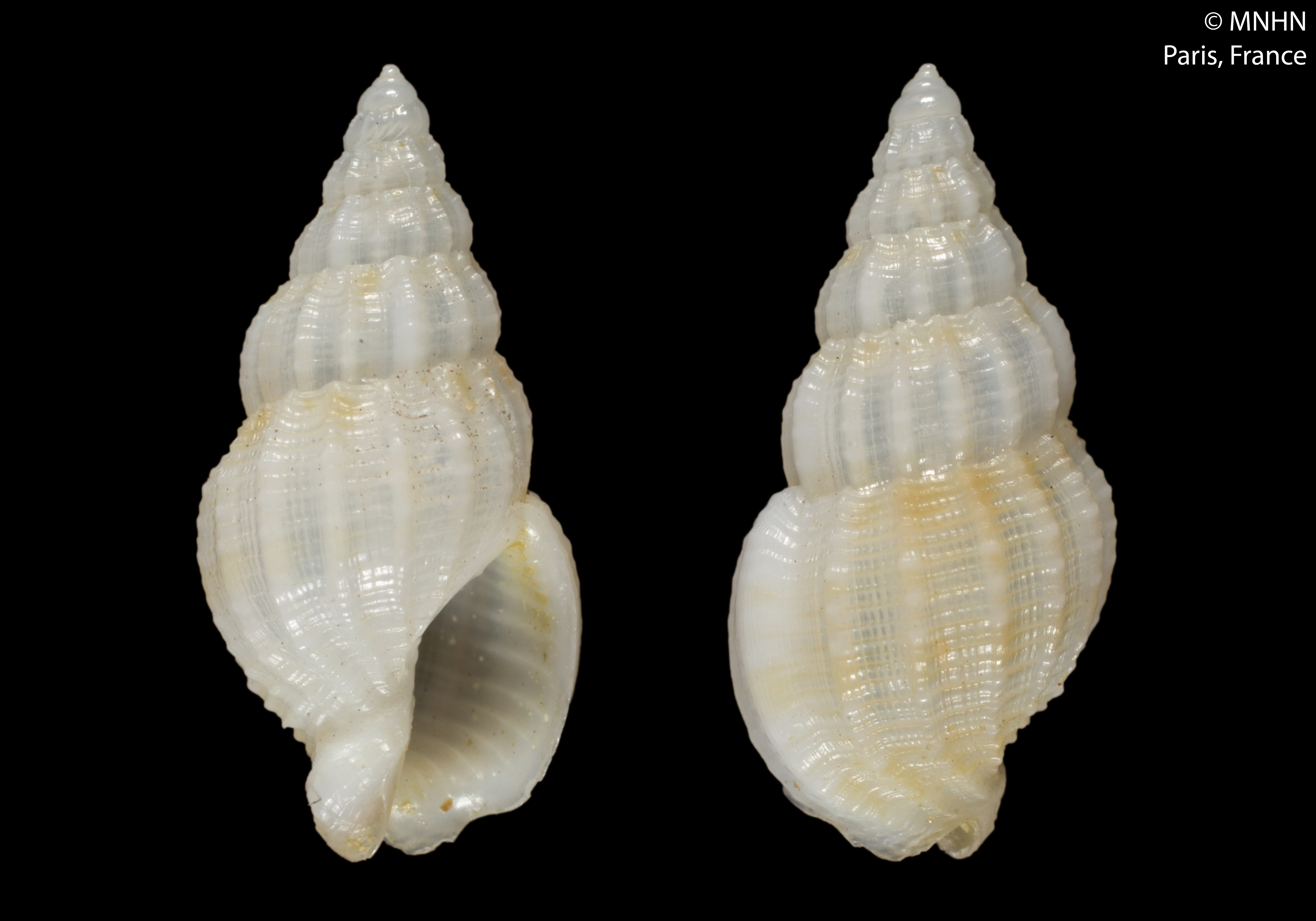
- Shell of Phos deforgesi (holotype at MNHN, Paris)

Scientific classification
- Kingdom: Animalia
- Phylum: Mollusca
- Class: Gastropoda
- Subclass: Caenogastropoda
- Order: Neogastropoda
- Family: Nassariidae
- Genus: Phos
- Species: P. deforgesi

Binomial name
- Phos deforgesi Fraussen, 2003

= Phos deforgesi =

Species of gastropod

Phos deforgesi is a species of sea snail, a marine gastropod mollusc in the family Nassariidae, the Nassa mud snails, or dog whelks of the family Buccinidae, the true whelks.

== Description ==
The length of the shell attains 12.7 mm, thin and semi-transparent. It is generally white, with pale orange bands along it.

== Distribution ==
This species is known only to occur in the Coral Sea, in the Australian northeast coast, but is expected to have a larger distribution.

== Etymology ==
P. deforgesi is named in honour of Bertrand Richer de Forges, the first person to direct scientific dredging for molluscs in Chesterfield.
