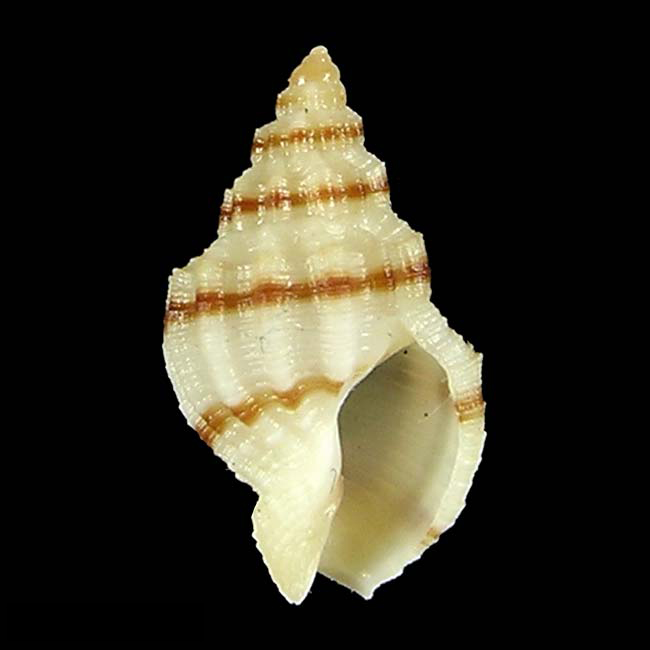

Scientific classification
- Kingdom: Animalia
- Phylum: Mollusca
- Class: Gastropoda
- Subclass: Caenogastropoda
- Order: Neogastropoda
- Family: Nassariidae
- Genus: Phos
- Species: P. temperatus

Binomial name
- Phos temperatus Fraussen & Poppe, 2005

= Phos temperatus =

Species of gastropod

Phos temperatus is a species of sea snail, a marine gastropod mollusk in the family Nassariidae , the Nassa mud snails, or dog whelks.
