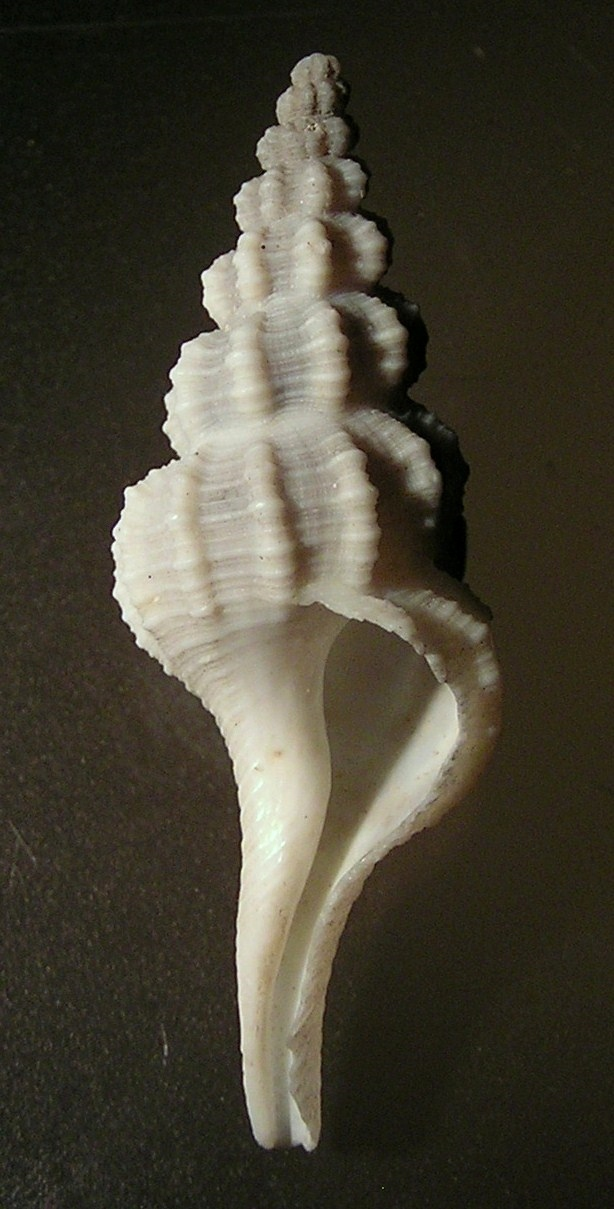
- Fusinus inglorius

Scientific classification
- Kingdom: Animalia
- Phylum: Mollusca
- Class: Gastropoda
- Subclass: Caenogastropoda
- Order: Neogastropoda
- Family: Fasciolariidae
- Genus: Fusinus
- Species: F. inglorius

Binomial name
- Fusinus inglorius Hadorn & Fraussen, 2006

= Fusinus inglorius =

Species of gastropod

Fusinus inglorius is a species of sea snail, a marine gastropod mollusk in the family Fasciolariidae, the spindle snails, the tulip snails and their allies.

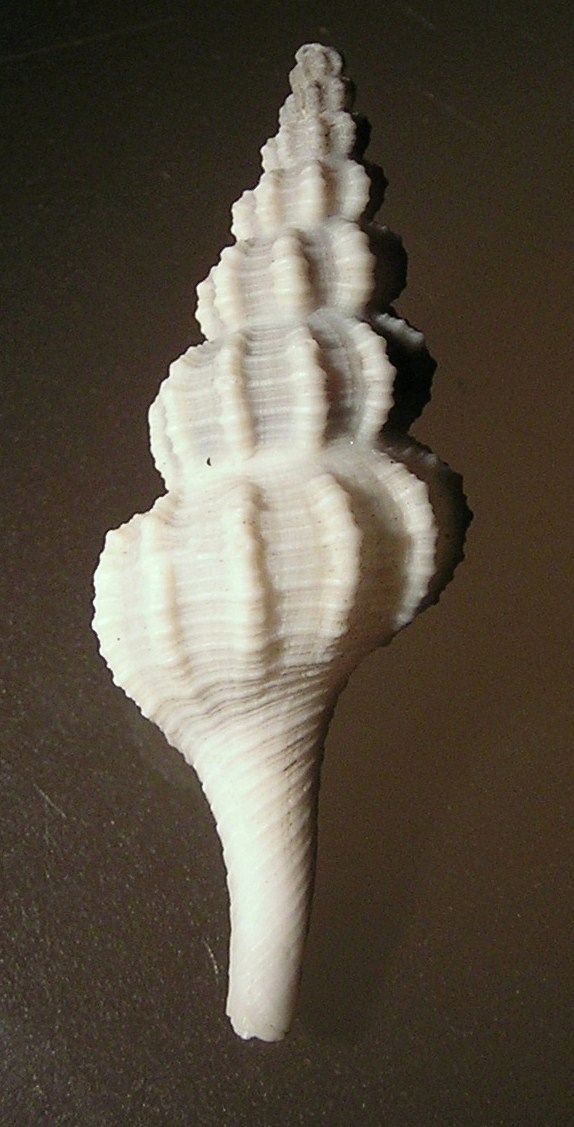
Fusinus inglorius
