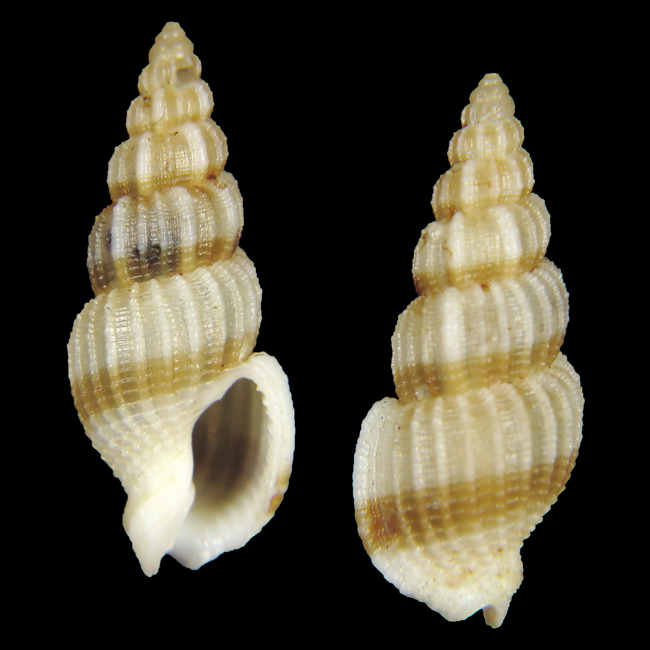
- Phos armillatus shell

Scientific classification
- Kingdom: Animalia
- Phylum: Mollusca
- Class: Gastropoda
- Subclass: Caenogastropoda
- Order: Neogastropoda
- Family: Nassariidae
- Genus: Phos
- Species: P. armillatus

Binomial name
- Phos armillatus (Fraussen & Poppe, 2005)

Synonyms
- Antillophos armillatus Fraussen & Poppe, 2005

= Phos armillatus =

Species of gastropod

Phos armillatus is a species of sea snail, a marine gastropod mollusk in the family Nassariidae, the Nassa mud snails, or dog whelks.
