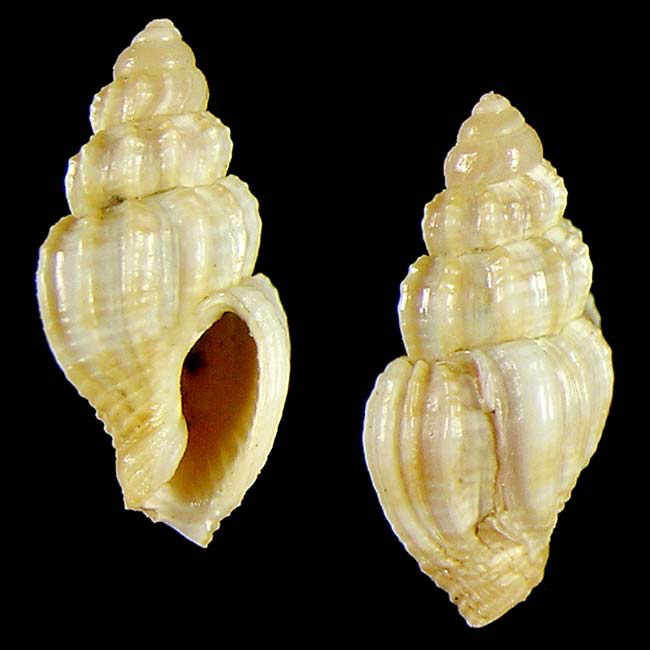
- Phos monsecourorum shell

Scientific classification
- Kingdom: Animalia
- Phylum: Mollusca
- Class: Gastropoda
- Subclass: Caenogastropoda
- Order: Neogastropoda
- Family: Nassariidae
- Genus: Phos
- Species: P. monsecourorum

Binomial name
- Phos monsecourorum (Fraussen & Poppe, 2005)

Synonyms
- Antillophos monsecourorum Fraussen & Poppe, 2005 (original combination)

= Phos monsecourorum =

Species of gastropod

Phos monsecourorum is a species of sea snail, a marine gastropod mollusc in the family Nassariidae.

== Distribution ==
This marine species occurs in the Philippines.
