= Phos durianoides =

Scientific classification
- Kingdom: Animalia
- Phylum: Mollusca
- Class: Gastropoda
- Subclass: Caenogastropoda
- Order: Neogastropoda
- Family: Nassariidae
- Genus: Phos
- Species: P. durianoides

Binomial name
- Phos durianoides (Fraussen & Poppe, 2005)

Synonyms
- Antillophos durianoides Fraussen & Poppe, 2005 (original combination)

Species of gastropod

Phos durianoides is a species of sea snail, a marine gastropod mollusc in the family Nassariidae, the Nassa mud snails, or dog whelks.
