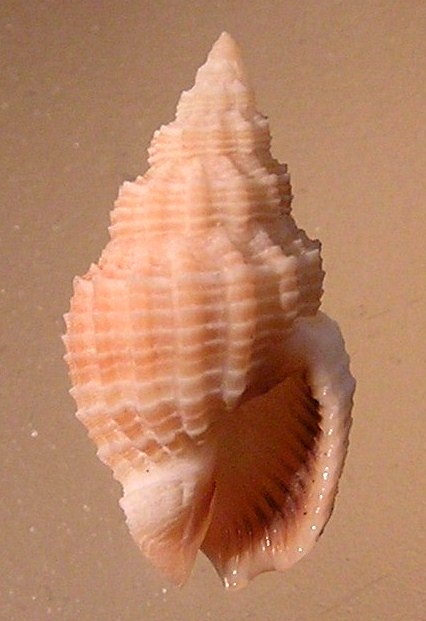

Scientific classification
- Kingdom: Animalia
- Phylum: Mollusca
- Class: Gastropoda
- Subclass: Caenogastropoda
- Order: Neogastropoda
- Family: Nassariidae
- Genus: Phos
- Species: P. cyanostoma

Binomial name
- Phos cyanostoma (A. Adams, 1850)

= Phos cyanostoma =

Species of gastropod

Phos cyanostoma is a species of sea snail, a marine gastropod mollusc in the family Nassariidae, the Nassa mud snails, or dog whelks.

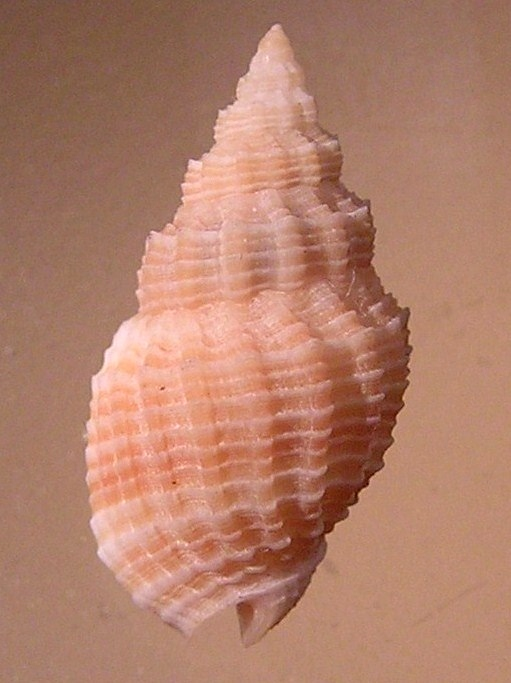

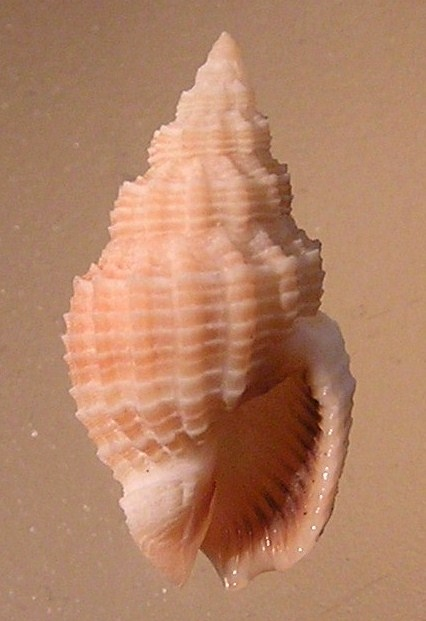
