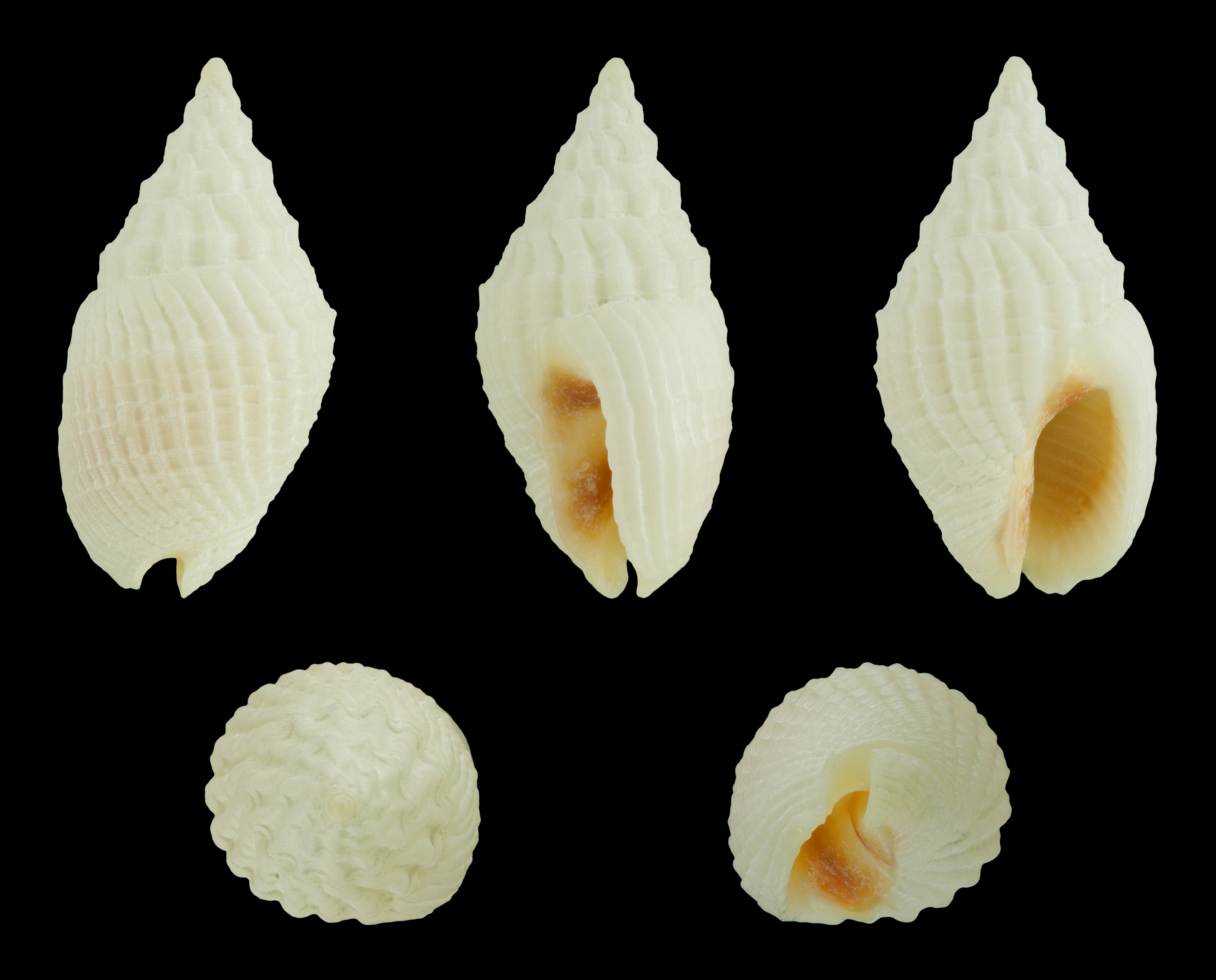

Scientific classification
- Kingdom: Animalia
- Phylum: Mollusca
- Class: Gastropoda
- Subclass: Caenogastropoda
- Order: Neogastropoda
- Family: Nassariidae
- Genus: Phos
- Species: P. textus

Binomial name
- Phos textus (Gmelin, 1791)

Synonyms
- Buccinum cancellatum Quoy & Gaimard, 1833; Buccinum pyrostoma L. Reeve, 1842; Buccinum textum Gmelin, 1791; Phos textum (Gmelin, 1791); Phos varians G. B. Sowerby II, 1859

= Phos textus =

Species of gastropod

Phos textus is a species of sea snail, a marine gastropod mollusk in the family Nassariidae.

== Taxon inquirendum ==
- Phos textus var. rhodostoma E. von Martens, 1880

== Description ==
The length of the shell attains 19.3 mm.

== Distribution ==
This marine species occurs in the Mascarene Basin and off the Solomon Islands.
