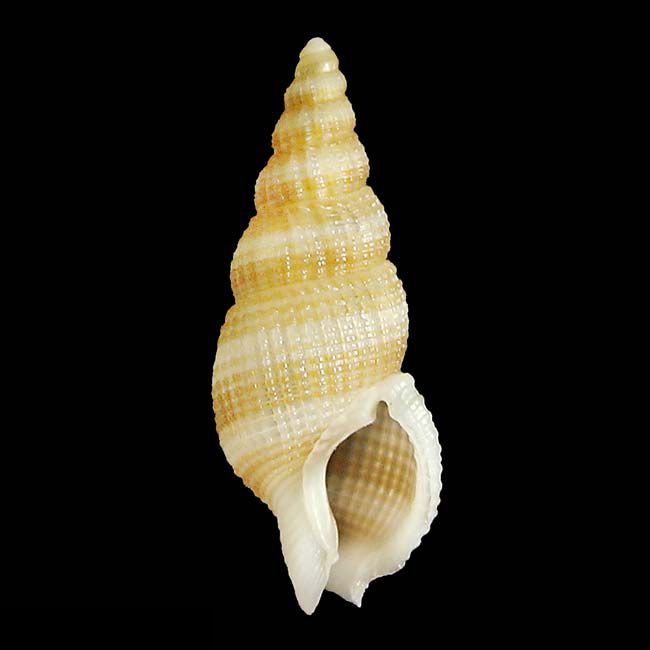

Scientific classification
- Kingdom: Animalia
- Phylum: Mollusca
- Class: Gastropoda
- Subclass: Caenogastropoda
- Order: Neogastropoda
- Family: Nassariidae
- Genus: Phos
- Species: P. miculus

Binomial name
- Phos miculus (Fraussen & Poppe, 2005)

Synonyms
- Antillophos miculus Fraussen & Poppe, 2005 (original combination)

= Phos miculus =

Species of gastropod

Phos miculus is a species of sea snail, a marine gastropod mollusc in the family Nassariidae, the true whelks.
