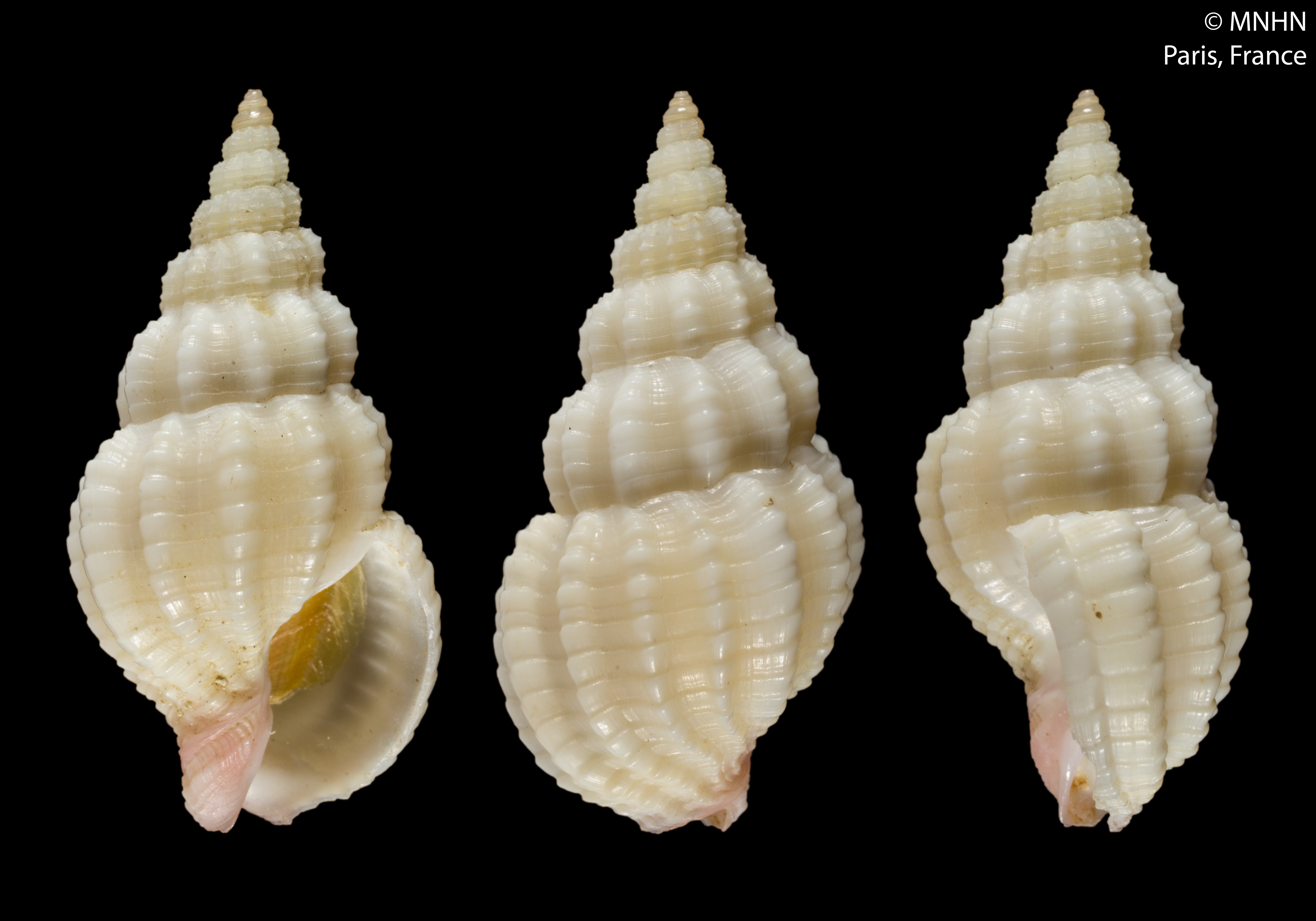
- Shell of Phos usquamaris (holotype at MNHN, Paris)

Scientific classification
- Kingdom: Animalia
- Phylum: Mollusca
- Class: Gastropoda
- Subclass: Caenogastropoda
- Order: Neogastropoda
- Family: Nassariidae
- Genus: Phos
- Species: P. usquamaris

Binomial name
- Phos usquamaris (Fraussen, 2005)

Synonyms
- Antillophos usquamaris Fraussen, 2005 (original combination)

= Phos usquamaris =

Species of gastropod

Phos usquamaris is a species of sea snail, a marine gastropod mollusc in the family Nassariidae, the true whelks and the like.

== Distribution ==
This marine species occurs on the Saya de Malha Bank (western Indian Ocean).
