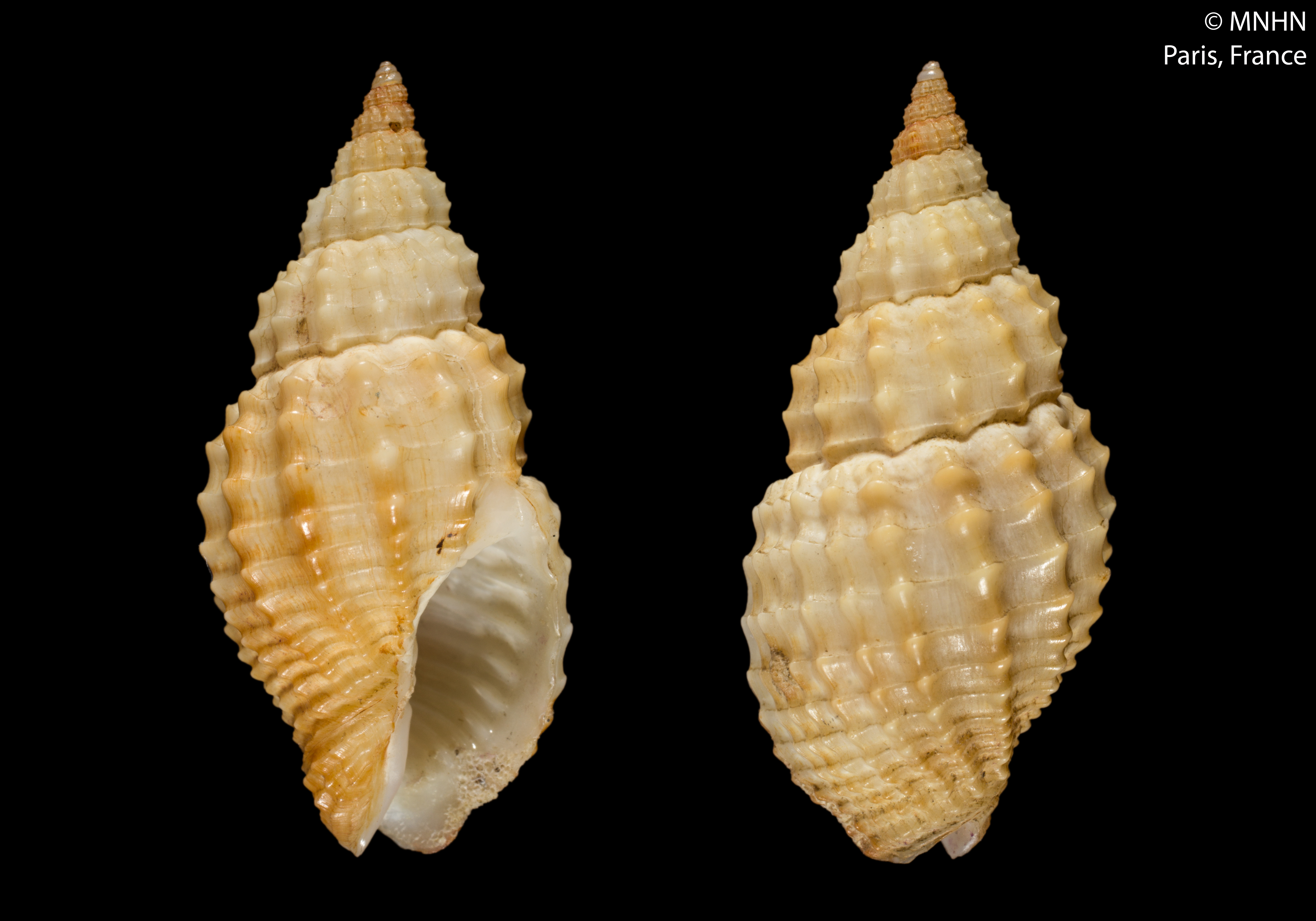
- Shell of Antillophos candeanus (syntype at MNHN, Paris)

Scientific classification
- Kingdom: Animalia
- Phylum: Mollusca
- Class: Gastropoda
- Subclass: Caenogastropoda
- Order: Neogastropoda
- Family: Nassariidae
- Genus: Antillophos
- Species: A. candeanus

Binomial name
- Antillophos candeanus (d'Orbigny, 1842)

Synonyms
- Cancellaria candeana d'Orbigny, 1842; Cancellaria candei d'Orbigny, 1842 (unjustified emendation of Cancellaria candeana); Phos antillarum Petit de la Saussaye, 1853

= Antillophos candeanus =

Species of gastropod

Antillophos candeanus is a species of sea snail, a marine gastropod mollusc in the family Nassariidae, the true whelks.

== Description ==
The length of the shell attains 28.5 mm.

== Distribution ==
This deepwater marine species occurs off Guadeloupe and Barbados.
