= Antillophos bahamensis =

Scientific classification
- Kingdom: Animalia
- Phylum: Mollusca
- Class: Gastropoda
- Subclass: Caenogastropoda
- Order: Neogastropoda
- Family: Nassariidae
- Genus: Antillophos
- Species: A. bahamensis

Binomial name
- Antillophos bahamensis Petuch, 2002

Synonyms
- Antillophos bahamasensis [orth. error twice in original publication]

Species of gastropod

Antillophos bahamensis is a species of sea snail, a marine gastropod mollusc in the family Nassariidae, the true whelks.

== Description ==
The maximum recorded shell length is 20 mm.

== Habitat ==
The minimum recorded depth is 400 m. The maximum recorded depth is 400 m.
