= Antillophos smithi =

Scientific classification
- Kingdom: Animalia
- Phylum: Mollusca
- Class: Gastropoda
- Subclass: Caenogastropoda
- Order: Neogastropoda
- Family: Nassariidae
- Genus: Antillophos
- Species: A. smithi

Binomial name
- Antillophos smithi (R. B. Watson, 1885)

Synonyms
- Antillophos freemani Petuch, 2002; Phos smithi R. B. Watson, 1885 (original combination)

Species of sea snail, a marine gastropod of mollusc

Antillophos smithi is a species of sea snail, a marine gastropod mollusc in the family Nassariidae, the true whelks and the like.

== Distribution ==
This species occurs in the Atlantic Ocean off Brazil.
