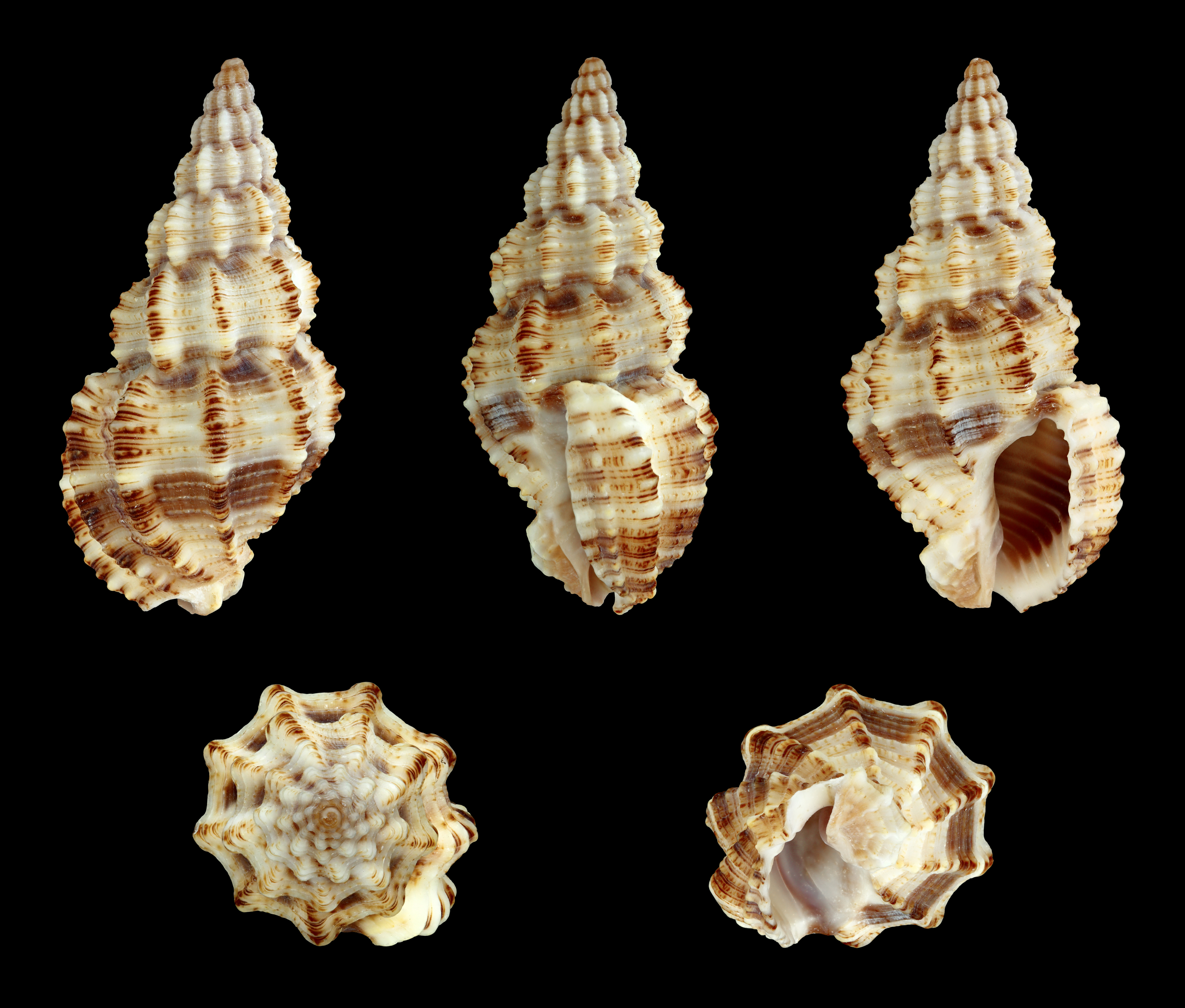
- Shell of Phos senticosus

Scientific classification
- Kingdom: Animalia
- Phylum: Mollusca
- Class: Gastropoda
- Subclass: Caenogastropoda
- Order: Neogastropoda
- Family: Nassariidae
- Genus: Phos
- Species: P. senticosus

Binomial name
- Phos senticosus (Linnaeus, 1758)

Synonyms
- Buccinum senticosum (Linnaeus, 1758); Cancellaria senticosa (Linnaeus, 1758); Murex senticosus Linnaeus, 1758

= Phos senticosus =

Species of gastropod

Phos senticosus, common name common Pacific phos or thorny phos, is a species of sea snail, a marine gastropod mollusk in the family Nassariidae, the Nassa mud snails, or dog whelks.

== Description ==
The shell size varies between 25 mm and 50 mm. The surface of the shell may be cream or reddish-brown, with one or two subsutural darker bands. The interior is white or pale purple. This shell has shouldered whorls, with strong axial ribs and a papillose surface. Outer lip is crenulate, with several strong lirae into the aperture.

The ovate, oblong shell is rough, and slightly turreted. Its entire surface is apparently armed with small spires. The spire is pointed and composed of nine or ten rather convex whorls, furnished with longitudinal folds or ribs, somewhat distant, and formed by the elevations of transverse striae, which are also cut transversely by other striae elevated and resembling sharp scales. These are a little more prominent upon the convexity of the longitudinal ribs than in their interstices, and it is their prolongation in this part, which causes them to resemble small spines. Its color is reddish, varied with fawn-colored or clear chestnut-brown spots. Oftentimes the lower whorl presents, towards its middle, a transverse brown band, the half only of which can be seen upon the upper whorls, the whole length of the sutures. The aperture is whitish, ovate, elongated, and narrowed towards its base. The outer lip has a slight obliquity, relatively to the axis of the shell. It is slightly crenulated upon the lip, and furnished interiorly with fifteen or sixteen transverse striae which are continued even to the depth of the cavity. The emargination is very oblique, accompanied externally by a thick, rounded, and twisted varix, which, revolving around the axis, terminates below the folds of the columella. This is slightly arcuated; one or two oblique folds are delineated at its base.

== Distribution ==
This species is found in Central Indo-West Pacific, off the Seychelles, Australia, New Caledonia and the Philippines. Specimens of this species were gathered by Jose Rizal in Dapitan in 1894.

== Habitat ==
This common tropical sea snail lives intertidally on sand, at depths more than 50 m.
