= Phos verbinneni =

Scientific classification
- Kingdom: Animalia
- Phylum: Mollusca
- Class: Gastropoda
- Subclass: Caenogastropoda
- Order: Neogastropoda
- Family: Nassariidae
- Genus: Phos
- Species: P. verbinneni

Binomial name
- Phos verbinneni (Fraussen, 2009)

Synonyms
- Antillophos verbinneni Fraussen, 2009 (original combination)

Species of gastropod

Phos verbinneni is a species of sea snail, a marine gastropod mollusc in the family Nassariidae.

== Distribution ==
This marine species occurs off the Philippines.
