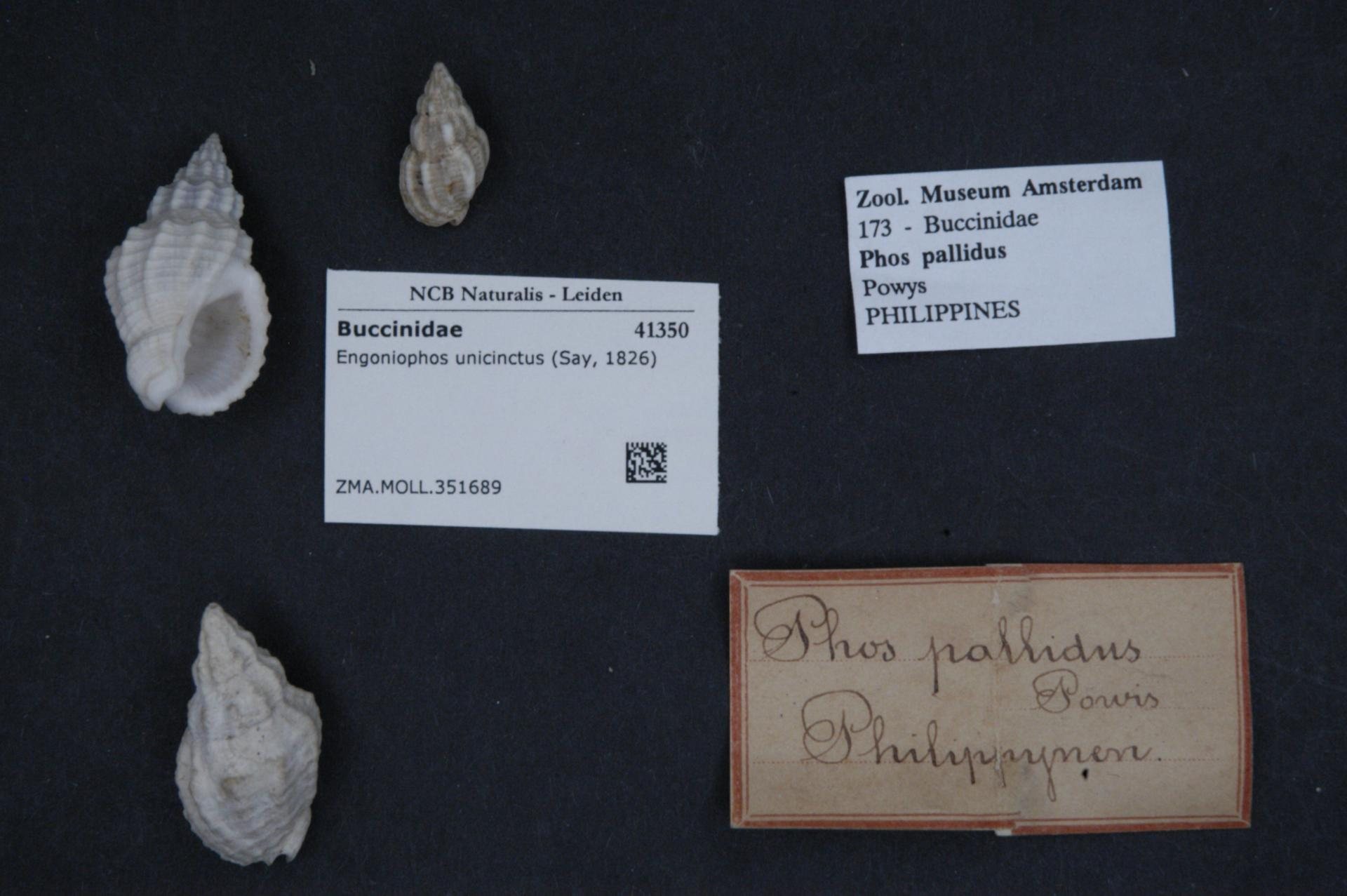
- Engoniophos unicinctus shells

Scientific classification
- Kingdom: Animalia
- Phylum: Mollusca
- Class: Gastropoda
- Subclass: Caenogastropoda
- Order: Neogastropoda
- Superfamily: Buccinoidea
- Family: Nassariidae
- Genus: Engoniophos; Woodring, 1928

Type species
- † Phos erectus Guppy, 1873

= Engoniophos =

Genus of gastropods

Engoniophos is a genus of sea snails, marine gastropod mollusks in the subfamily of the family Nassariidae.

== Taxonomy ==
This genus was treated within family Buccinidae. It was moved to family Nassariidae in 2016.

== Species ==
Species within the genus Engoniophos include:

- † Engoniophos erectus (Guppy, 1873)
- Engoniophos unicinctus (Say, 1826)
