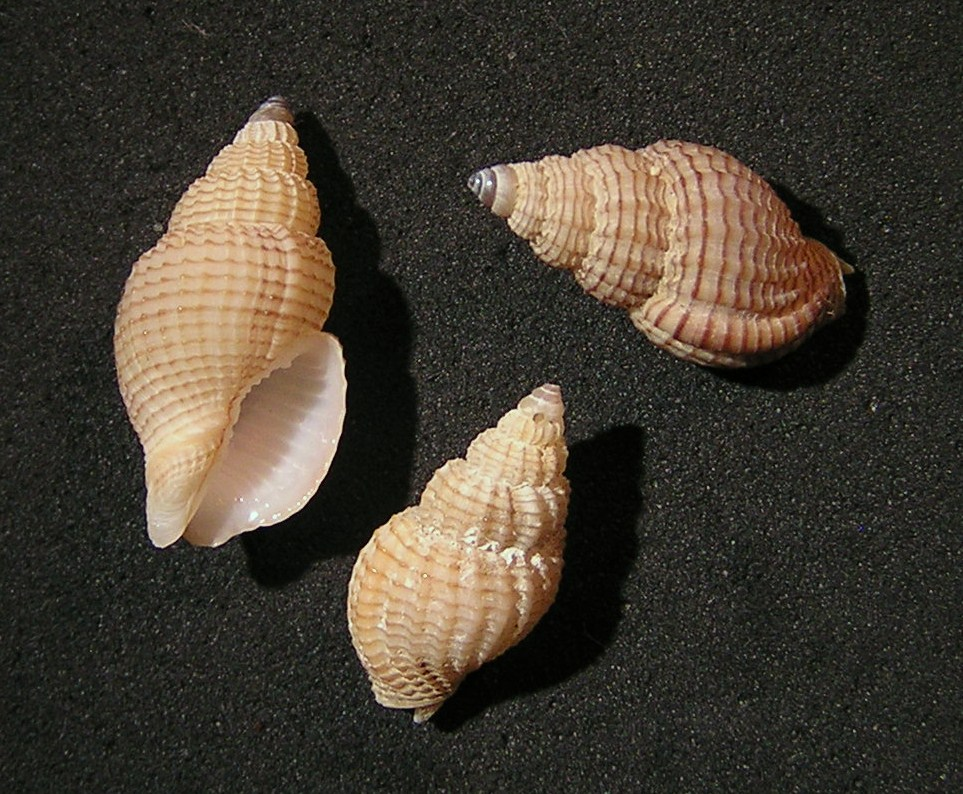
- Shells of Phos lucubratonis

Scientific classification
- Kingdom: Animalia
- Phylum: Mollusca
- Class: Gastropoda
- Subclass: Caenogastropoda
- Order: Neogastropoda
- Family: Nassariidae
- Genus: Phos
- Species: P. lucubratonis

Binomial name
- Phos lucubratonis (Fraussen & Poppe, 2005)

Synonyms
- Antillophos lucubratonis Fraussen & Poppe, 2005 (original combination)

= Phos lucubratonis =

Species of gastropod

Phos lucubratonis is a species of sea snail, a marine gastropod mollusc in the family Nassariidae, the true whelks and the like.

== Distribution ==
This marine species occurs off the Philippines.
