= Antillophos verriculum =

Scientific classification
- Kingdom: Animalia
- Phylum: Mollusca
- Class: Gastropoda
- Subclass: Caenogastropoda
- Order: Neogastropoda
- Family: Nassariidae
- Genus: Antillophos
- Species: A. verriculum

Binomial name
- Antillophos verriculum Watters, 2009

Species of gastropod

Antillophos verriculum is a species of sea snail, a marine gastropod mollusc in the family Nassariidae, the true whelks and the like.
