= Phos hastilis =

Scientific classification
- Kingdom: Animalia
- Phylum: Mollusca
- Class: Gastropoda
- Subclass: Caenogastropoda
- Order: Neogastropoda
- Family: Nassariidae
- Genus: Phos
- Species: P. hastilis

Binomial name
- Phos hastilis (Fraussen & Poppe, 2005)

Synonyms
- Antillophos hastilis Fraussen & Poppe, 2005 (original combination)

Species of gastropod

Phos hastilis is a species of sea snail, a marine gastropod mollusc in the family Nassariidae, the Nassa mud snails, or dog whelks.
