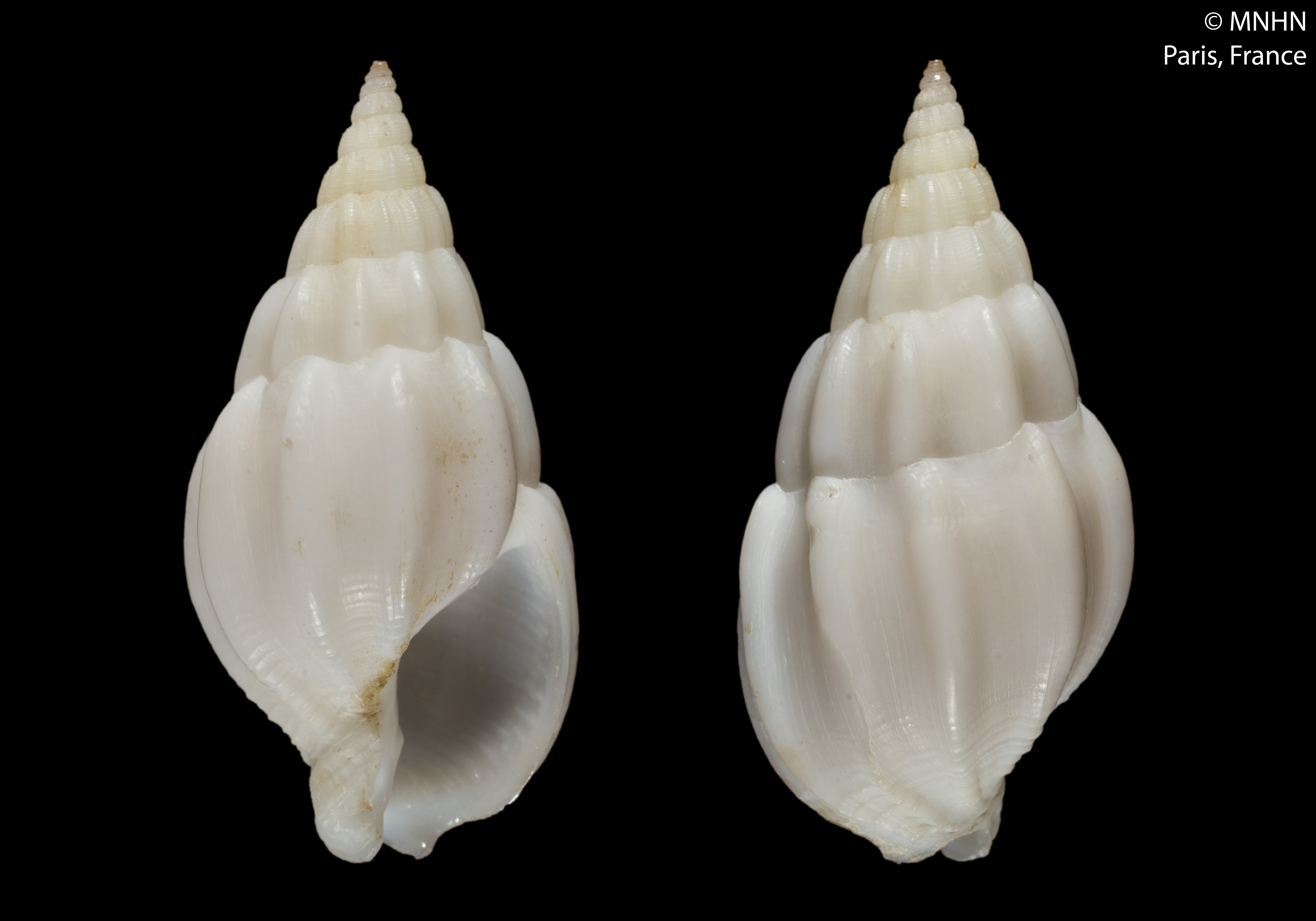
- Shell of Phos alabastrum (holotype at MNHN, Paris)

Scientific classification
- Kingdom: Animalia
- Phylum: Mollusca
- Class: Gastropoda
- Subclass: Caenogastropoda
- Order: Neogastropoda
- Family: Nassariidae
- Genus: Phos
- Species: P. alabastrum

Binomial name
- Phos alabastrum Fraussen, 2003

Synonyms
- Antillophos alabastrum (Fraussen, 2003)

= Phos alabastrum =

Species of gastropod

Phos alabastrum is a species of sea snail, a marine gastropod mollusk in the family Nassariidae, the Nassa mud snails, or dog whelks.

== Description ==
The length of the shell attains 30.7 mm.

== Distribution ==
This marine species occurs in the Coral Sea.
