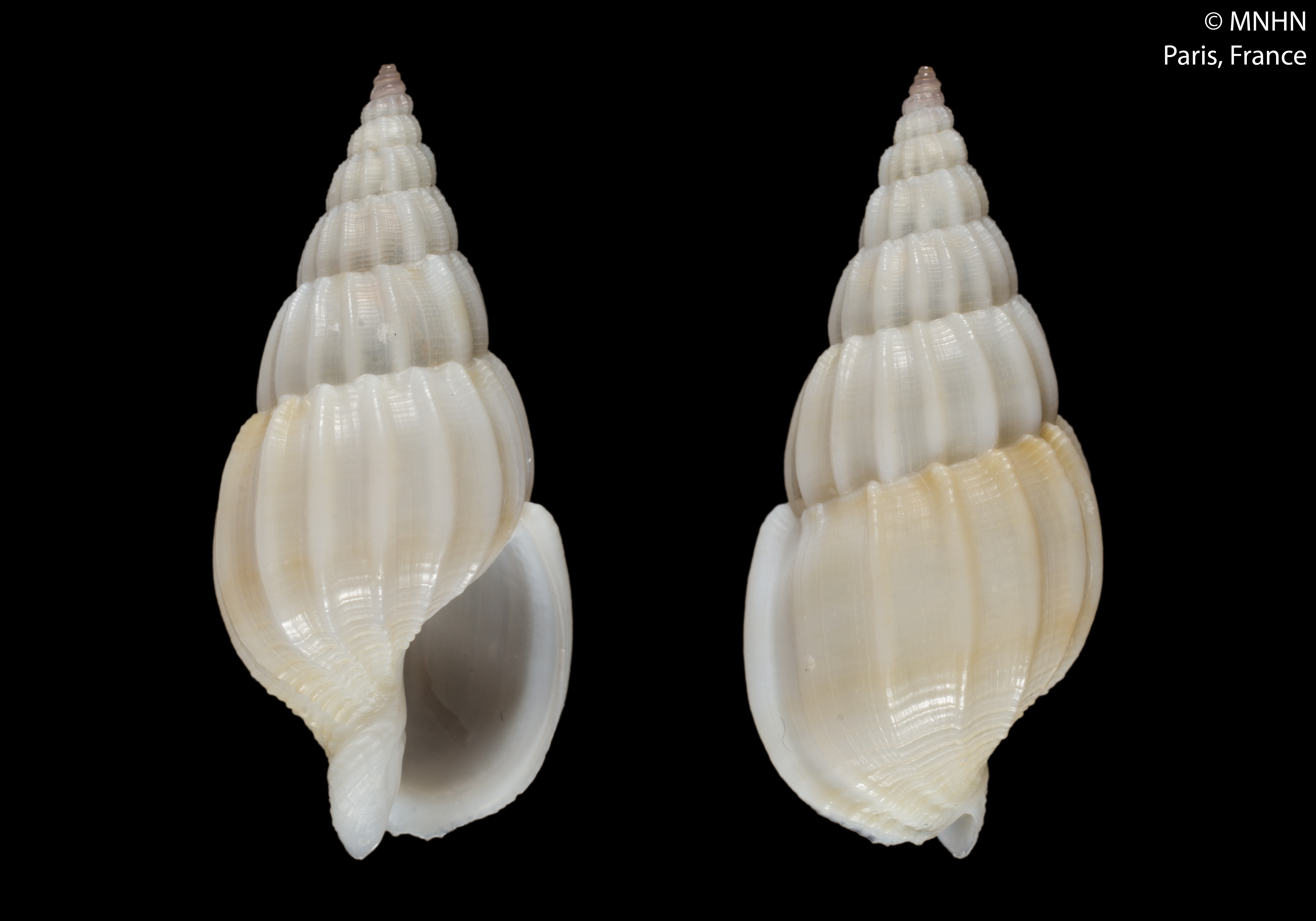
- Shell of Phos boucheti (holotype at MNHN, Paris)

Scientific classification
- Kingdom: Animalia
- Phylum: Mollusca
- Class: Gastropoda
- Subclass: Caenogastropoda
- Order: Neogastropoda
- Family: Nassariidae
- Genus: Phos
- Species: P. boucheti

Binomial name
- Phos boucheti Fraussen, 2003

Synonyms
- Antillophos boucheti (Fraussen, 2003) (original combination)

= Phos boucheti =

Species of gastropod

Phos boucheti is a species of sea snail, a marine gastropod mollusc in the family Nassariidae, the Nassa mud snails, or dog whelks.

== Distribution ==
This marine species occurs in the Coral Sea.
