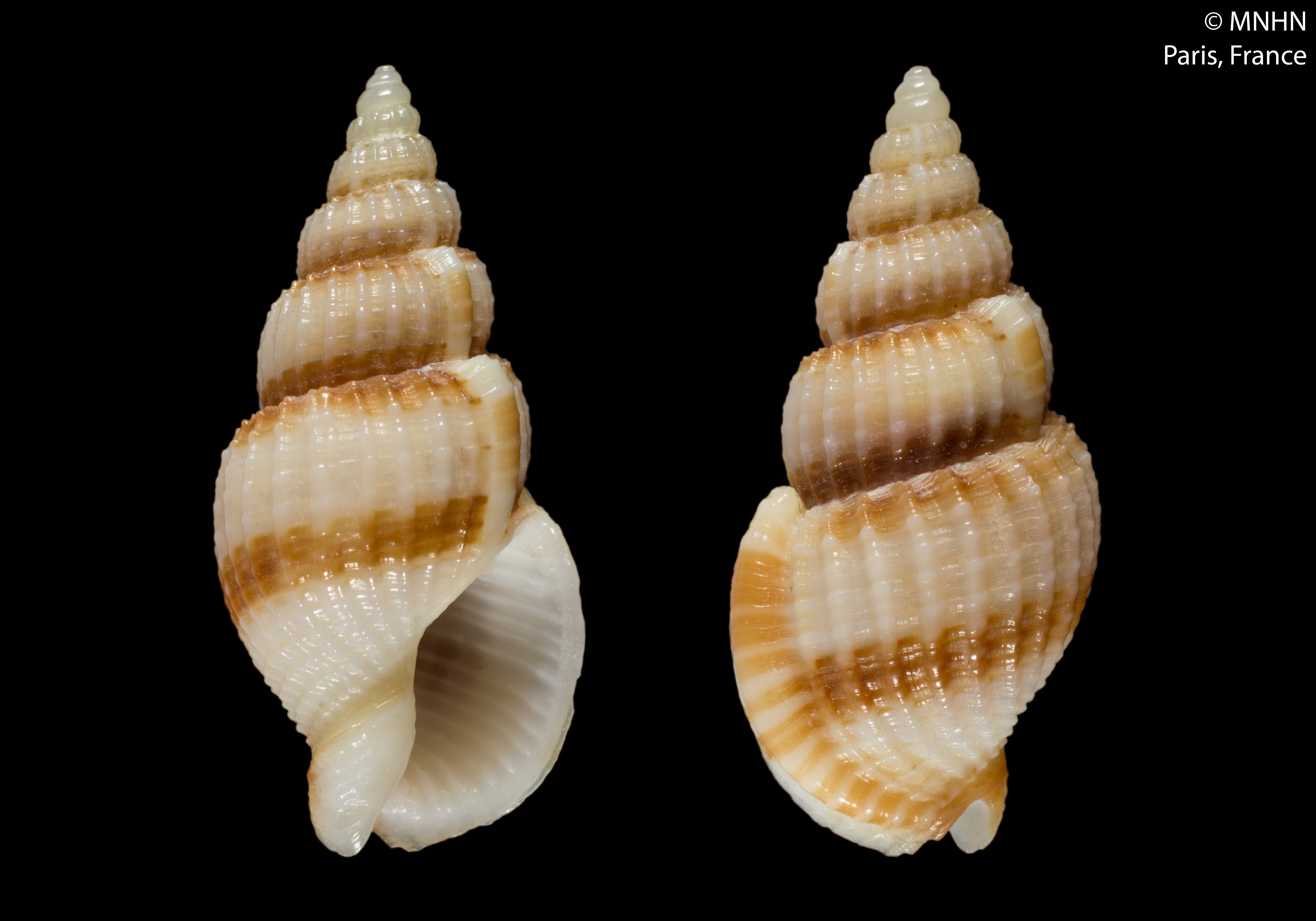
- Shell of Phos brigitteae (holotype at MNHN, Paris)

Scientific classification
- Kingdom: Animalia
- Phylum: Mollusca
- Class: Gastropoda
- Subclass: Caenogastropoda
- Order: Neogastropoda
- Family: Nassariidae
- Genus: Phos
- Species: P. brigitteae

Binomial name
- Phos brigitteae (Stahlschmidt & Fraussen, 2009)

Synonyms
- Antillophos brigitteae Stahlschmidt & Fraussen, 2009 (original combination)

= Phos brigitteae =

Species of gastropod

Phos brigitteae is a species of sea snail, a marine gastropod mollusc in the family Nassariidae, the Nassa mud snails, or dog whelks.
