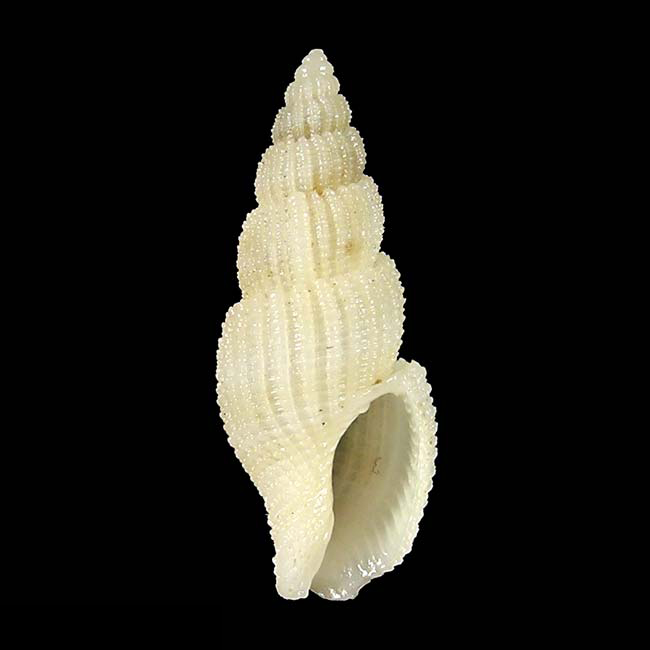

Scientific classification
- Kingdom: Animalia
- Phylum: Mollusca
- Class: Gastropoda
- Subclass: Caenogastropoda
- Order: Neogastropoda
- Family: Nassariidae
- Genus: Phos
- Species: P. intactus

Binomial name
- Phos intactus (Fraussen & Poppe, 2005)

Synonyms
- Antillophos intactus Fraussen & Poppe, 2005

= Phos intactus =

Species of gastropod

Phos intactus is a species of sea snail, a marine gastropod mollusc in the family Nassariidae, the true whelks and the like.

== Distribution ==
This marine species occurs off the Philippines.
