= Antillophos adelus =

Scientific classification
- Kingdom: Animalia
- Phylum: Mollusca
- Class: Gastropoda
- Subclass: Caenogastropoda
- Order: Neogastropoda
- Family: Nassariidae
- Genus: Antillophos
- Species: A. adelus

Binomial name
- Antillophos adelus (Schwengel, 1942)

Synonyms
- Parviphos adelus (Schwengel, 1942); Phos adelus Schwengel, 1942 (original combination)

Species of gastropod

Antillophos adelus is a species of sea snail, a marine gastropod mollusc in the family Nassariidae.

== Distribution ==
This marine species occurs off the Dominican Republic.
