= Phos gemmulifer =

Scientific classification
- Kingdom: Animalia
- Phylum: Mollusca
- Class: Gastropoda
- Subclass: Caenogastropoda
- Order: Neogastropoda
- Family: Nassariidae
- Genus: Phos
- Species: P. gemmulifer

Binomial name
- Phos gemmulifer Kilburn, 2000

Synonyms
- Antillophos gemmulifer (Kilburn, 2000) (original combination); Phos (Phos) gemmulifer Kilburn, 2000 (basionym); Phos gemmulatus (misspelling)

Species of gastropod

Phos gemmulifer is a species of sea snail, a marine gastropod mollusc in the family Nassariidae, the Nassa mud snails, or dog whelks.

== Distribution ==
This marine species occurs off Mozambique.
