= Antillophos elegans =

Scientific classification
- Kingdom: Animalia
- Phylum: Mollusca
- Class: Gastropoda
- Subclass: Caenogastropoda
- Order: Neogastropoda
- Family: Nassariidae
- Genus: Antillophos
- Species: A. elegans

Binomial name
- Antillophos elegans (Guppy, 1866)

Species of gastropod

Antillophos elegans is a species of sea snail, a marine gastropod mollusc in the family Nassariidae, the true whelks and the like.
