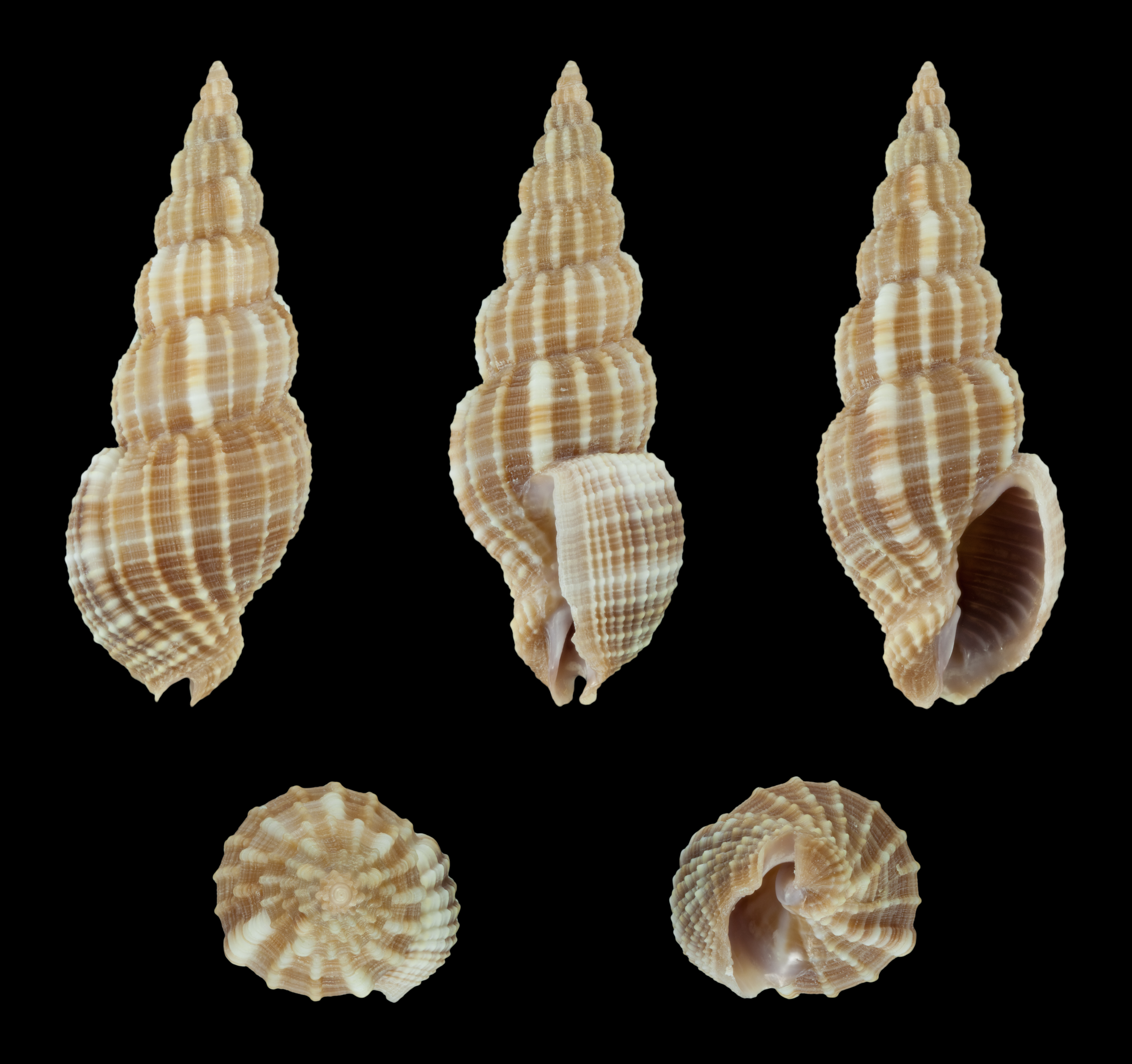
- Phos roseatus shells

Scientific classification
- Kingdom: Animalia
- Phylum: Mollusca
- Class: Gastropoda
- Subclass: Caenogastropoda
- Order: Neogastropoda
- Family: Nassariidae
- Genus: Phos
- Species: P. roseatus

Binomial name
- Phos roseatus Hinds, 1844

Synonyms
- Antillophos roseatus (Hinds, 1844); Antillophos (Antillophos) varicosus Gould, A.A., 1849

= Phos roseatus =

Species of gastropod

Phos roseatus is a species of sea snail, a marine gastropod mollusc in the family Nassariidae.

== Distribution ==
This species is distributed in the Red Sea, South Africa, the Mascarene Basin, the Philippines and Australia.
