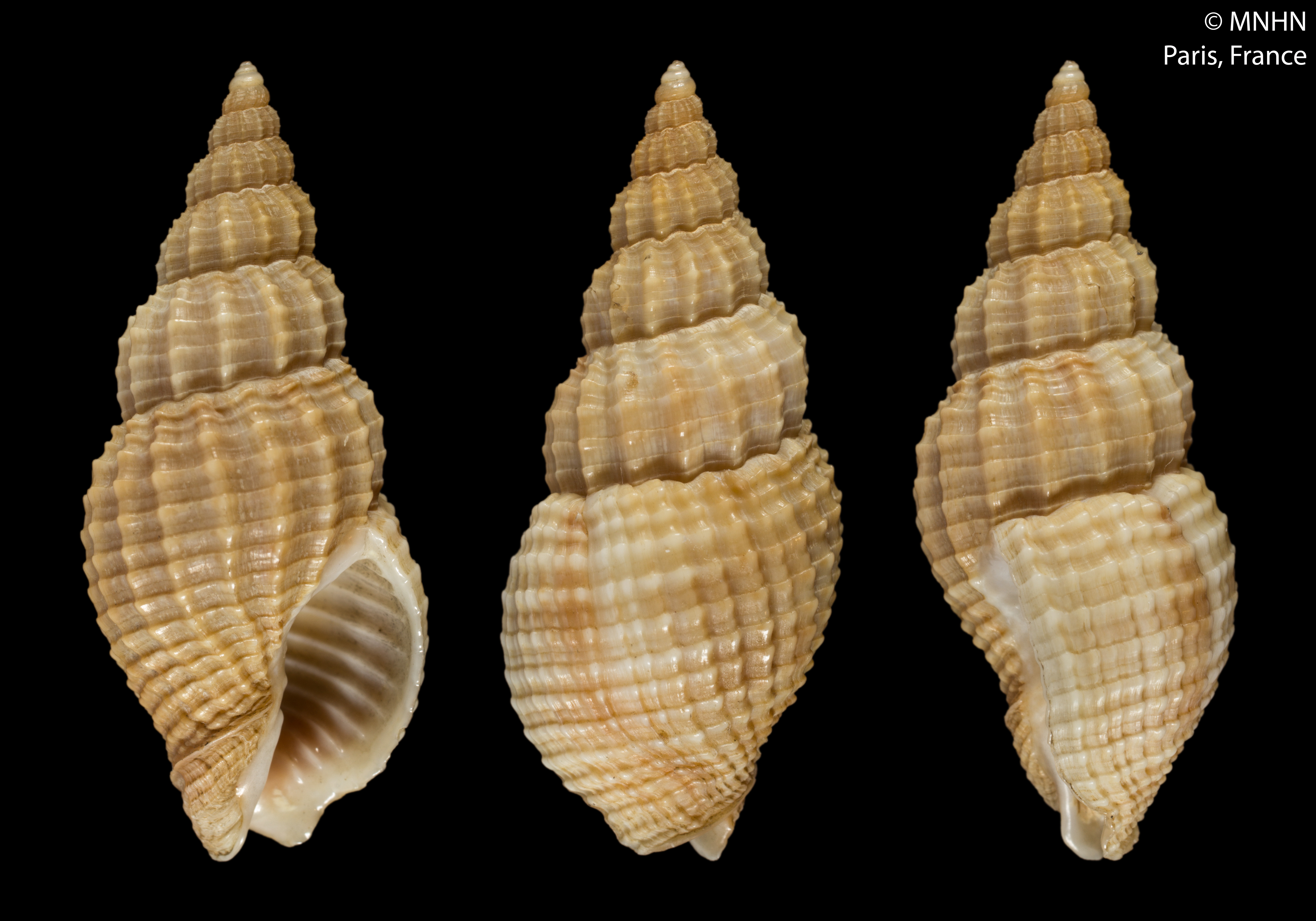
- Shell of Antillophos grateloupianus (syntype at MNHN, Paris)

Scientific classification
- Kingdom: Animalia
- Phylum: Mollusca
- Class: Gastropoda
- Subclass: Caenogastropoda
- Order: Neogastropoda
- Family: Nassariidae
- Genus: Antillophos
- Species: A. grateloupianus

Binomial name
- Antillophos grateloupianus (Petit, 1853)

Synonyms
- Phos grateloupianus Petit de la Saussaye, 1853 (basionym)

= Antillophos grateloupianus =

Species of gastropod

Antillophos grateloupianus is a species of sea snail, a marine gastropod mollusc in the family Nassariidae, the true whelks and the like.

== Distribution ==
This species occurs in the Atlantic Ocean off Senegal.
