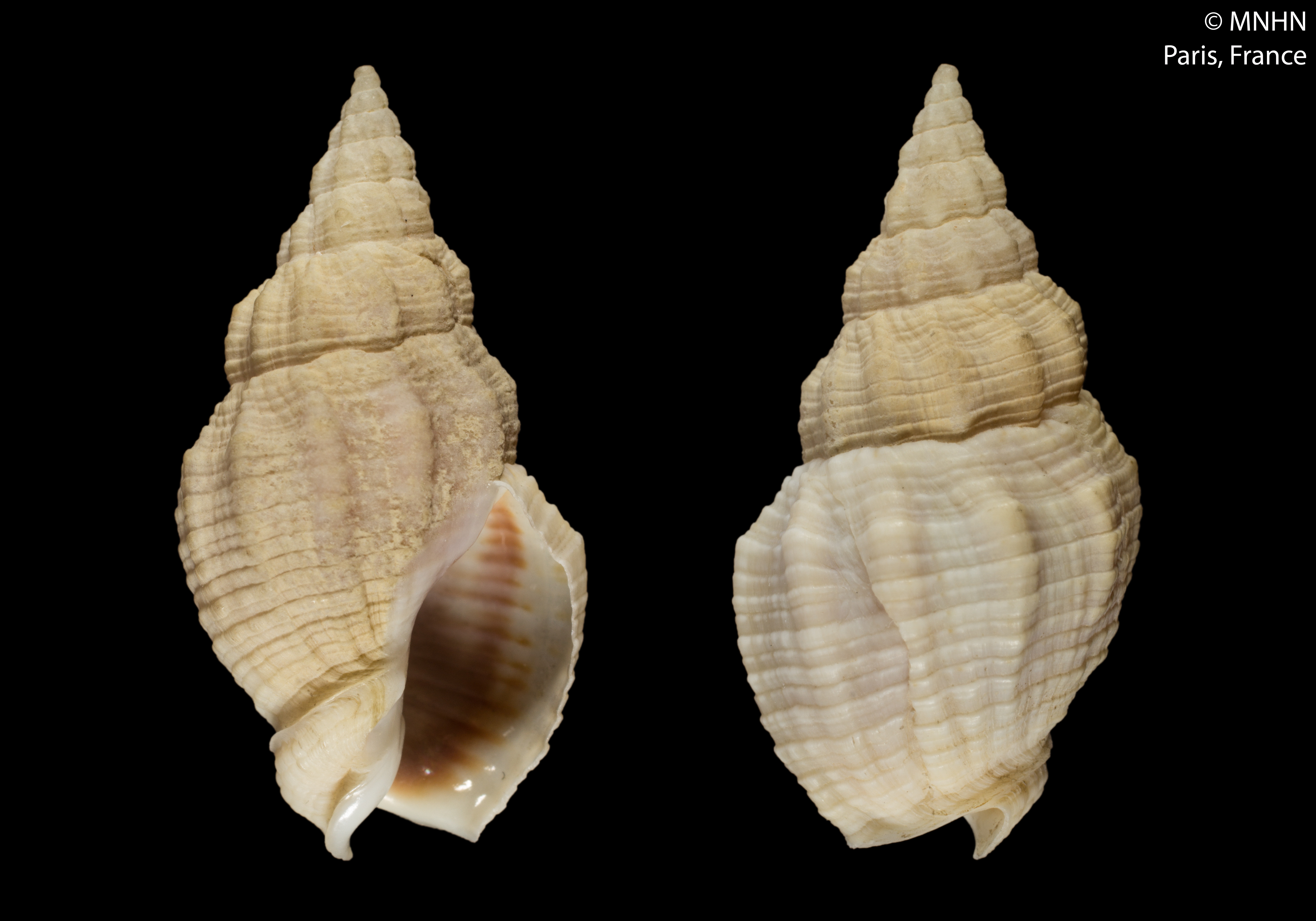
- Engoniophos unicinctus shells (syntype at MNHN, Paris)

Scientific classification
- Kingdom: Animalia
- Phylum: Mollusca
- Class: Gastropoda
- Subclass: Caenogastropoda
- Order: Neogastropoda
- Family: Nassariidae
- Genus: Engoniophos
- Species: E. unicinctus

Binomial name
- Engoniophos unicinctus (Say, 1826)

Synonyms
- Nassa guadelupensis Petit de la Saussaye, 1852; Nassa pallida Powys, 1835; Nassa unicincta Say, 1826 (original combination); Phos unicinctus (Say, 1826); Strongylocera textilina Mörch, 1852

= Engoniophos unicinctus =

Species of gastropod

Engoniophos unicinctus is a species of sea snail, a marine gastropod mollusc in the family Nassariidae. The length of the shell attains 27.1 mm. This marine species occurs off Guadeloupe.
