= Koen Fraussen =

Belgian malacologist

- Born: 1965
- Scientific career
- Fields: Malacology
- Institutions: Muséum National d'Histoire Naturelle
- Author abbrev. (zoology): Fraussen

Koen Fraussen (born 1965) is a Belgian amateur malacologist, shell collector, and expert in the Buccinoidea.

== Biography ==
Fraussen was born in Brussels. His interest in the ocean started during family holidays on the Adriatic Sea. He began collecting shells at the age of 2.

Fraussen is a part-time bus driver who also studies whelk shells for the Muséum National d'Histoire Naturelle. In exchange for his curatorial work, Fraussen is given a paratype of each specimen he identifies. Philippe Bouchet considers Fraussen "the world expert" on the Buccinidae.

In 2010, Fraussen and biologist Stefaan Wera released the book Schelpen aan de Belgische kust. With the Muséum National, Fraussen published 20 new species of the Photinae (subfamily of the Nassariidae) as of 2017.

== Legacy ==
Fraussen is honored by several eponyms, including Buccinum frausseni, Conus frausseni, Eccliseogyra frausseni, Engina frausseni, Fusinus frausseni, Inquisitor frausseni, Metaal frausseni, Pristiterebra frausseni, and Tomlinia frausseni.
