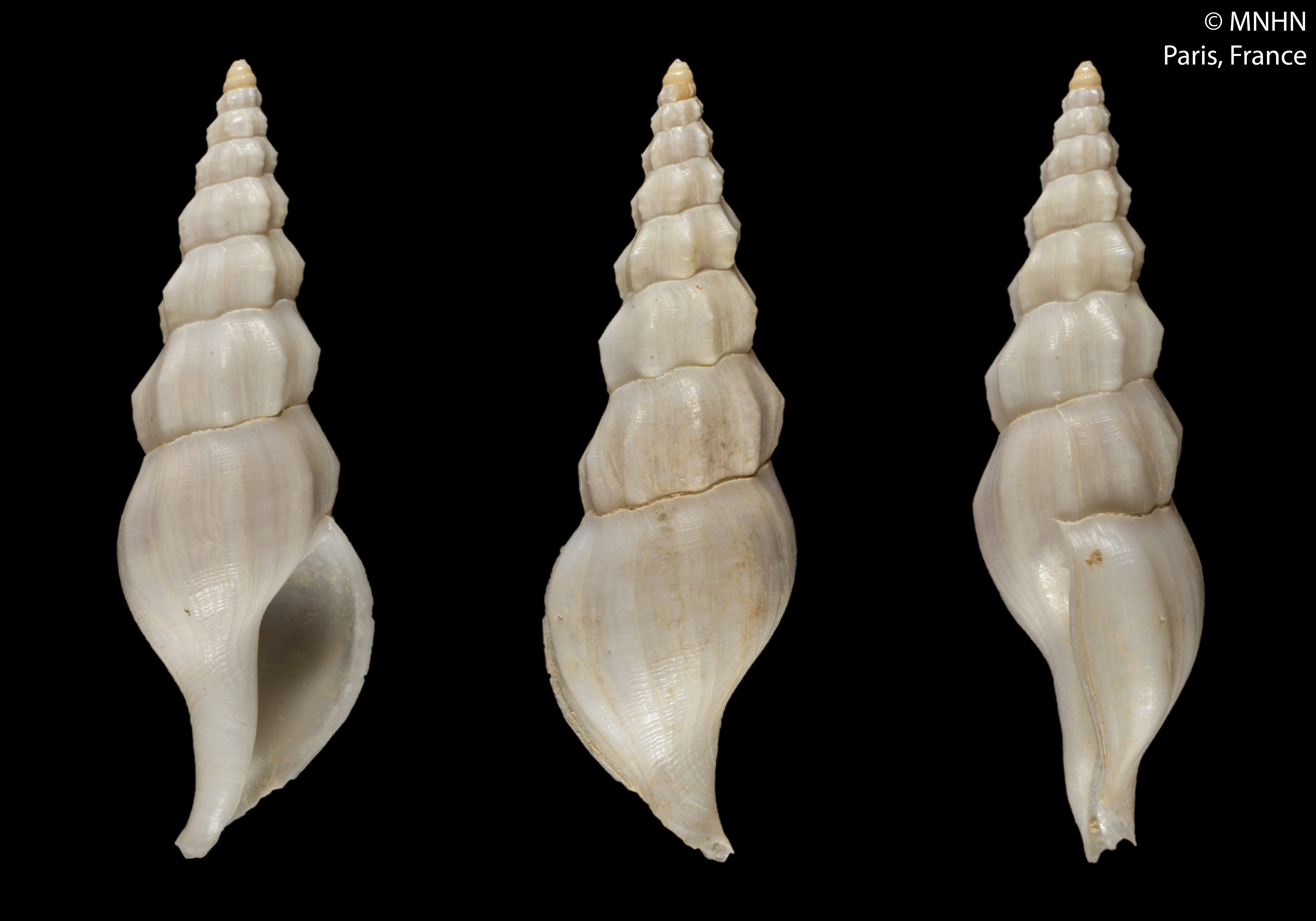
- Shell of Amiantofusus sebalis (holotype at MNHN, Paris)

Scientific classification
- Kingdom: Animalia
- Phylum: Mollusca
- Class: Gastropoda
- Subclass: Caenogastropoda
- Order: Neogastropoda
- Family: Fasciolariidae
- Genus: Amiantofusus
- Species: A. sebalis

Binomial name
- Amiantofusus sebalis Fraussen, Kantor & Hadorn, 2007

= Amiantofusus sebalis =

Species of gastropod

Amiantofusus sebalis is a species of sea snail, a marine gastropod mollusc in the family Fasciolariidae, the spindle snails, the tulip snails and their allies.

== Description ==
The length of the shell attains 23.6 mm.

== Distribution ==
This marine species occurs off eastern New Caledonia and off the Solomon Islands; i the Bismarck Sea; in the Chinese Sea off An-Da Chiao.
