= Amiantofusus granulus =

Scientific classification
- Kingdom: Animalia
- Phylum: Mollusca
- Class: Gastropoda
- Subclass: Caenogastropoda
- Order: Neogastropoda
- Family: Fasciolariidae
- Genus: Amiantofusus
- Species: A. granulus

Binomial name
- Amiantofusus granulus S.-Q. Zhang, Fraussen & S.-P. Zhang, 2022

Species of gastropod

Amiantofusus granulus is a species of sea snail, a marine gastropod mollusc in the family Fasciolariidae, the spindle snails, the tulip snails and their allies.

== Description ==
The length of the shell attains 32.8 mm.

== Distribution ==
This marine species occurs off on seamounts near Caroline Islands.
