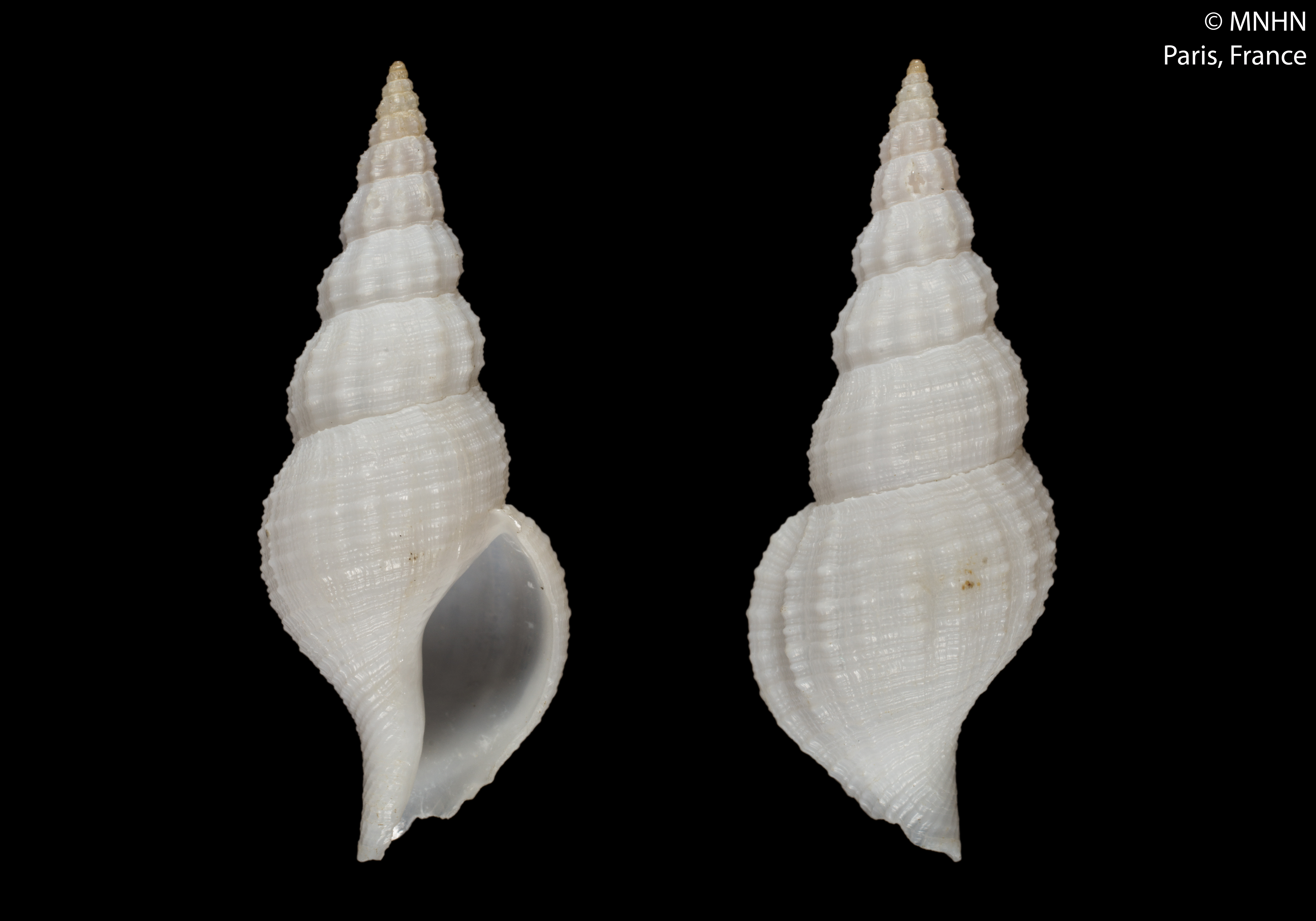
- Shell of Amiantofusus gloriabundus (holotype at MNHN, Paris)

Scientific classification
- Kingdom: Animalia
- Phylum: Mollusca
- Class: Gastropoda
- Subclass: Caenogastropoda
- Order: Neogastropoda
- Family: Fasciolariidae
- Genus: Amiantofusus
- Species: A. gloriabundus

Binomial name
- Amiantofusus gloriabundus Fraussen, Kantor & Hadorn, 2007

= Amiantofusus gloriabundus =

Species of mollusc

Amiantofusus gloriabundus is a species of sea snail, a marine gastropod mollusc in the family Fasciolariidae, the spindle snails, the tulip snails and their allies.

== Description ==
The length of the shell attains 34.9 mm.

Large spiraling shells, often grey or mottled red in color, sometimes with curved white sections on the shells of elder males. Small spines or protrusions on the shell are common at specific points.

== Distribution ==
Amiantofusus gloriabundus is mainly found in temperate shallow waters off the coast of South America or Indonesia and other parts of the South Pacific (Wallis and Futuna, the North Fiji Basin). They are also found in cooler seas off the coast of India because of the food rich waters there.
