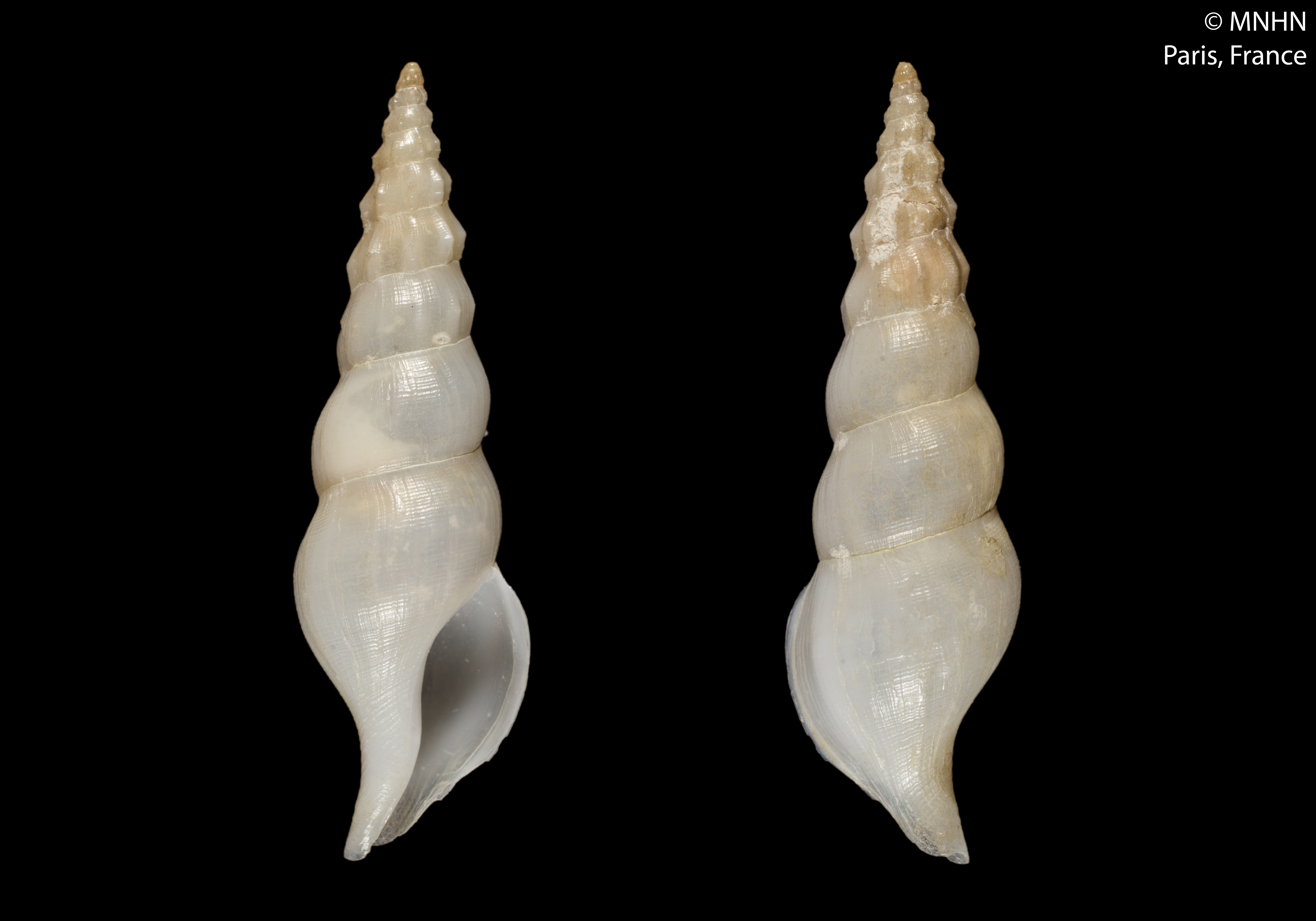
- Amiantofusus candoris

Scientific classification
- Kingdom: Animalia
- Phylum: Mollusca
- Class: Gastropoda
- Subclass: Caenogastropoda
- Order: Neogastropoda
- Superfamily: Buccinoidea
- Family: Fasciolariidae
- Subfamily: Fusininae
- Genus: Amiantofusus; Fraussen, Kantor & Hadorn, 2007

Type species
- Fusus amiantus Dall, 1889

Species
- See text

= Amiantofusus =

Genus of gastropods

Amiantofusus is a genus of sea snails, marine gastropod mollusks in the family Fasciolariidae, the spindle snails, the tulip snails and their allies.

== Species ==
Species within the genus Amiantofusus include:

- Amiantofusus amiantus (Dall, 1889)
- Amiantofusus borbonicus Fraussen, Kantor & Hadorn, 2007
- Amiantofusus cartilago Fraussen, Kantor & Hadorn, 2007
- Amiantofusus gloriabundus Fraussen, Kantor & Hadorn, 2007
- Amiantofusus granulus S.-Q. Zhang, Fraussen & S.-P. Zhang, 2022
- Amiantofusus maestratii Fraussen, Kantor & Hadorn, 2007
- Amiantofusus pacificus Fraussen, Kantor & Hadorn, 2007
- Amiantofusus sebalis Fraussen, Kantor & Hadorn, 2007
- Amiantofusus tchangsii S.-Q. Zhang, Fraussen & S.-P. Zhang, 2022

Synonyms

- Amiantofusus borbonica Fraussen, Kantor & Hadorn, 2007: synonym of Amiantofusus borbonicus Fraussen, Kantor & Hadorn, 2007 (wrong gender agreement of specific epithet)
- Amiantofusus candoris Fraussen, Kantor & Hadorn, 2007: synonym of Amiantofusus sebalis Fraussen, Kantor & Hadorn, 2007
