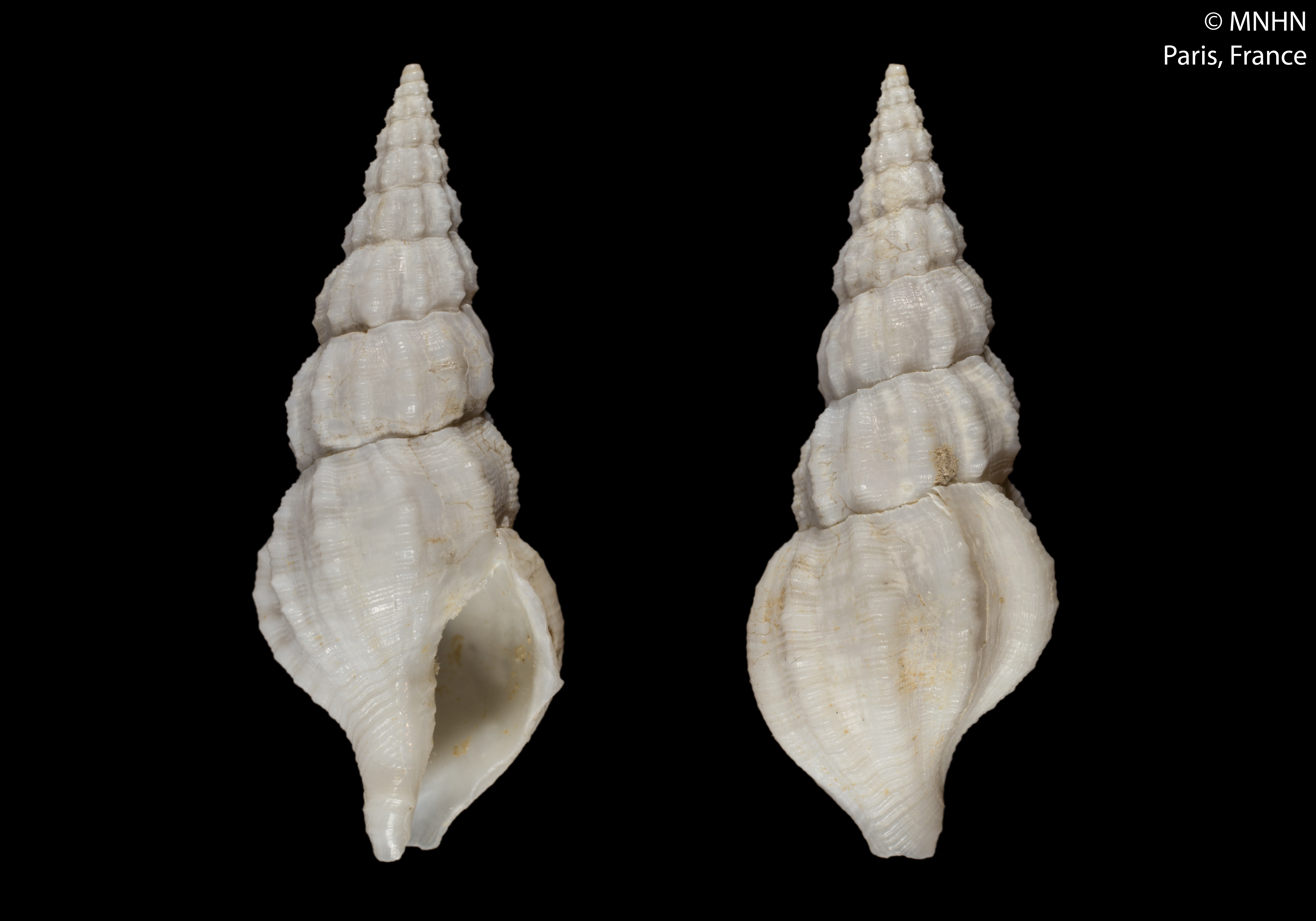
- Shell of Amiantofusus cartilago (holotype at MNHN, Paris)

Scientific classification
- Kingdom: Animalia
- Phylum: Mollusca
- Class: Gastropoda
- Subclass: Caenogastropoda
- Order: Neogastropoda
- Family: Fasciolariidae
- Genus: Amiantofusus
- Species: A. cartilago

Binomial name
- Amiantofusus cartilago Fraussen, Kantor & Hadorn, 2007

= Amiantofusus cartilago =

Species of gastropod

Amiantofusus cartilago is a species of sea snail, a marine gastropod mollusc in the family Fasciolariidae, the spindle snails, the tulip snails and their allies.

== Taxonomy ==
Amiantofusus cartilago was first described by Fraussen, Kantor, and Hadorn in 2007 as part of their establishment of the genus Amiantofusus. The genus was created to accommodate a small group of deep-sea fasciolariid species, with Fusus amiantus Dall, 1889 from the Atlantic Ocean designated as the type species. During the same publication, they described several other species from the Indo-West Pacific region, including A. cartilago.

== Description ==
The shell of Amiantofusus cartilago attains a length of 30.8 mm. Like other members of Fasciolariidae, the shell is spindle-shaped and biconic with an elongated spire. The siphonal canal is well-developed and moderately long.

The members of the genus Amiantofusus possess shells that are quite similar to those of the family Buccinidae but differ in having a distinctive protoconch morphology with striking semilunar axial riblets. The protoconch is the embryonic or larval shell that forms before the adult shell (teleoconch) begins to develop. In Amiantofusus species, the protoconch is multispiral with a large diameter, which indicates a planktotrophic larval development, giving these species a high dispersal potential.

== Distribution and habitat ==
This species is found in the Mozambique Channel, an arm of the Indian Ocean located between Madagascar and Mozambique. It is one of the few Amiantofusus species found in the western Indian Ocean, as most other species in the genus inhabit the Western Pacific region.

Amiantofusus cartilago inhabits the upper bathyal zone, typically at depths from 200 to 2,000 meters. The bathyal zone is characterized by low light conditions, relatively stable temperatures (typically ranging from 4 °C to 15 °C), and slow water currents. This zone lies between the continental shelf and the abyssal plain and is known for hosting diverse marine communities despite challenging environmental conditions.

== Biology and ecology ==
Like other members of the Fasciolariidae family, A. cartilago is carnivorous, feeding on other gastropods and bivalves. Some members of this family are also known to prey on worms and barnacles. They typically use their radula (a specialized feeding organ) to drill through the shells of their prey.

The radula in Fasciolariidae is characterized by narrow central teeth with three cusps and wide lateral teeth with numerous comblike cusps, which is adapted to their carnivorous feeding habits.

Studies of the foregut anatomy of different specimens of A. cartilago have indicated significant differences, with some specimens having a highly derived salivary gland, which may be related to specialized feeding strategies.

Fasciolariidae members are gonochoristic, meaning individuals have a single sex. Female snails deposit their eggs in horny capsules either in single form or in clusters arranged around a hollow axis. The single forms have a flattened, disk-shaped, or vase-shaped form, while the clusters may be hemispherical or cylindrical. Development in this family is usually direct, with larvae emerging from the capsules as either free-swimming young or crawling young.

The Mozambique Channel, where A. cartilago is found, is known for its high mesoscale variability and complex ocean circulation patterns, making it one of the most turbulent areas in the world's oceans. This dynamic environment likely influences the distribution and ecology of bathyal species like A. cartilago.

== Evolutionary history ==
The family Fasciolariidae, to which Amiantofusus belongs, first appeared approximately 110 million years ago during the Cretaceous period. Although the specific evolutionary history of Amiantofusus is not well documented, its wide geographic distribution (from the Atlantic Ocean to the Indo-West Pacific) suggests a complex evolutionary history.

The bathyal fauna along continental margins, including species like A. cartilago, represents a significant element of marine biodiversity that is often distinct from shelf fauna and likely has followed a different evolutionary path. The diversity of protoconch morphology within the genus suggests varied adaptations to different environmental conditions throughout its evolutionary history.

== Conservation ==
Recent molecular studies have suggested that many identified specimens of Amiantofusus species may be misidentified, which has implications for conservation and taxonomic work on this species. For example, genetic analyses revealed that A. sebalis and A. candoris are likely conspecific, with a COI pairwise genetic distance of only 0.5–0.8%, falling within the range of intraspecific variation for the genus.

The bathyal zone where this species lives is increasingly subject to human impacts, including deep-sea mining and trawling activities, which could potentially threaten poorly understood species like A. cartilago.

== Related species ==
Amiantofusus cartilago is one of approximately 10 currently known species in the genus Amiantofusus. The other species include:

- A. amiantus (Dall, 1889) - the type species, from the Atlantic Ocean
- A. borbonicus Fraussen, Kantor & Hadorn, 2007 - from the western Indian Ocean
- A. pacificus Fraussen, Kantor & Hadorn, 2007 - from the Western Pacific
- A. candoris Fraussen, Kantor & Hadorn, 2007 - from the Western Pacific
- A. sebalis Fraussen, Kantor & Hadorn, 2007 - from the Western Pacific
- A. gloriabundus Fraussen, Kantor & Hadorn, 2007 - from the Western Pacific
- A. granulus Zhang, Fraussen & Zhang, 2022 - from the Western Pacific
- A. tchangsii Zhang, Fraussen & Zhang, 2022 - from the Western Pacific

While many Amiantofusus species inhabit the Western Pacific, A. cartilago and A. borbonicus are found in the western Indian Ocean, and A. amiantus is the only species recorded from the Atlantic Ocean. This distribution pattern suggests that there are likely more undiscovered species awaiting discovery in unexplored deep-sea areas.

The species exhibit different depth ranges within the bathyal zone, with A. tchangsii representing the deepest record (down to 2291 m) and A. pacificus the shallowest (minimum depth of 364 m).
