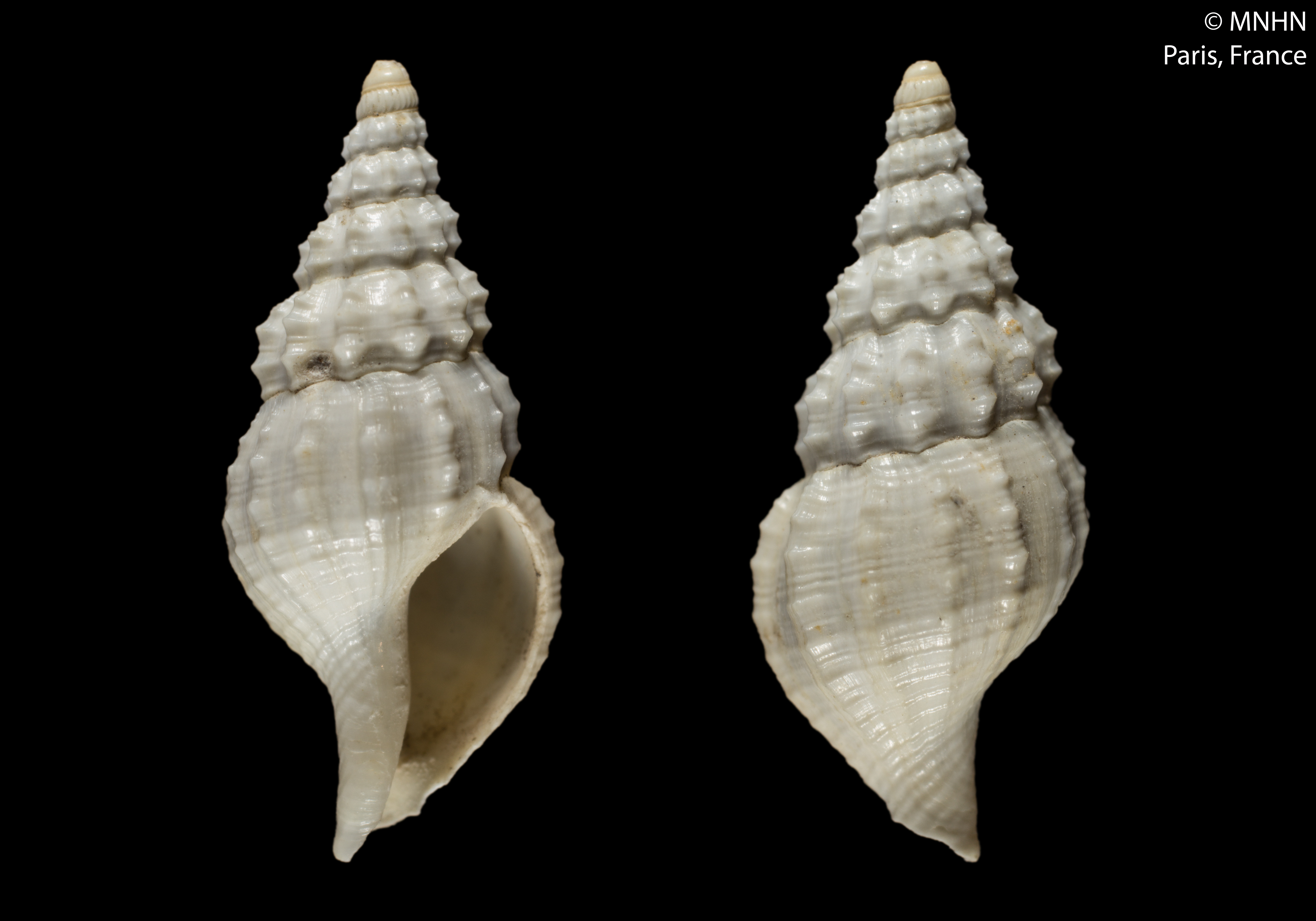
- Shell of Amiantofusus borbonicus (holotype at MNHN, Paris)

Scientific classification
- Kingdom: Animalia
- Phylum: Mollusca
- Class: Gastropoda
- Subclass: Caenogastropoda
- Order: Neogastropoda
- Family: Fasciolariidae
- Genus: Amiantofusus
- Species: A. borbonicus

Binomial name
- Amiantofusus borbonicus Fraussen, Kantor & Hadorn, 2007

Synonyms
- Amiantofusus borbonica Fraussen, Kantor & Hadorn, 2007 (wrong gender agreement of specific epithet)

= Amiantofusus borbonicus =

Species of gastropod

Amiantofusus borbonicus is a species of sea snail, a marine gastropod mollusc in the family Fasciolariidae, the spindle snails, the tulip snails and their allies.

== Description ==
The length of the shell attains 12 mm. It is fusiform (spindle-shaped) and slender, with a high spire and a short siphonal canal, and is white in colour.

== Distribution ==
This marine species occurs in the Indian Ocean off Réunion.
