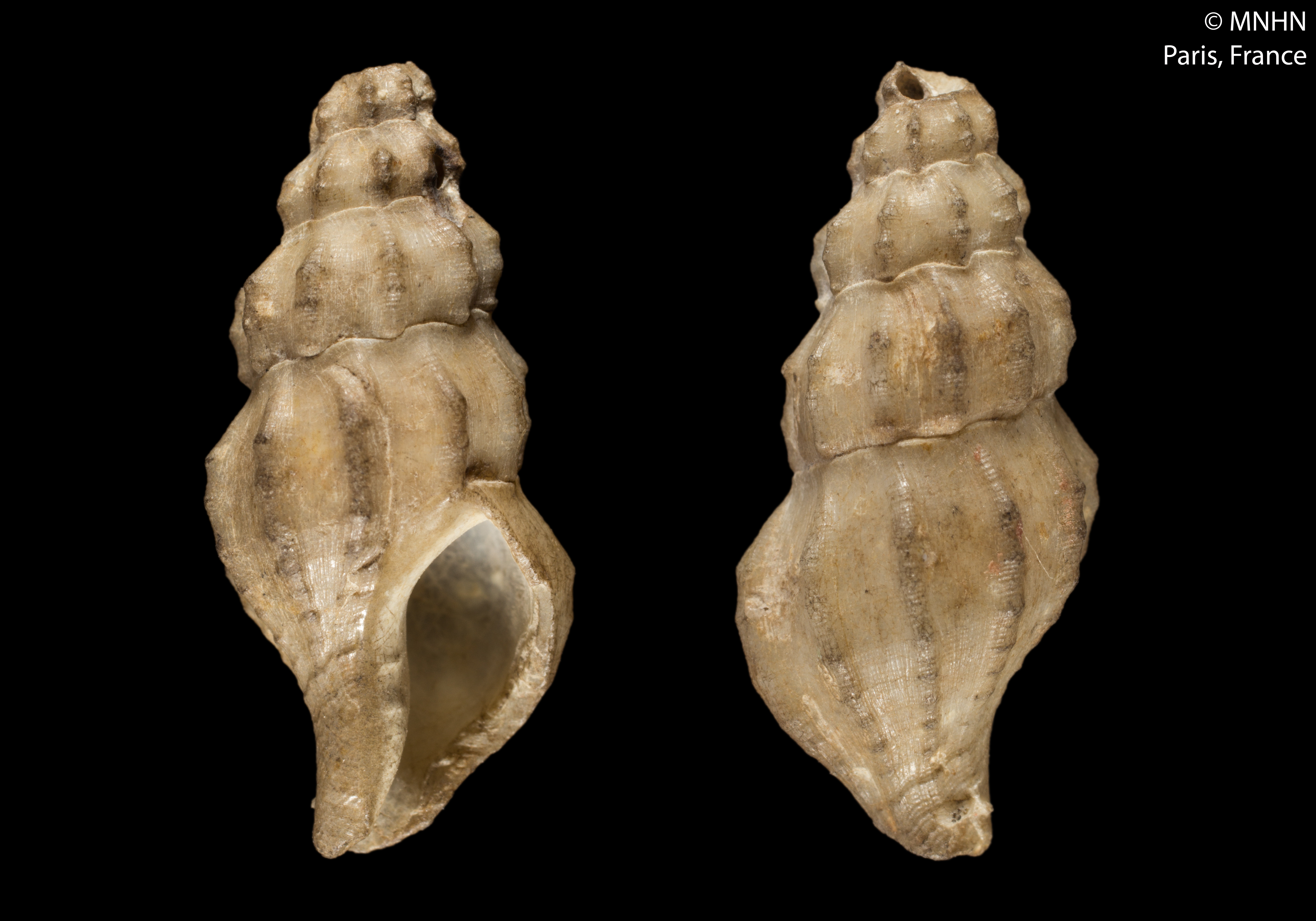
- Shell of Amiantofusus amiantus (syntype at MNHN, Paris)

Scientific classification
- Kingdom: Animalia
- Phylum: Mollusca
- Class: Gastropoda
- Subclass: Caenogastropoda
- Order: Neogastropoda
- Family: Fasciolariidae
- Genus: Amiantofusus
- Species: A. amiantus

Binomial name
- Amiantofusus amiantus (Dall, 1889)

Synonyms
- Fusus amiantus Dall, 1889; Fusinus amiantus (Dall, 1889); Fusus grimaldii Dautzenberg & Fischer H., 1896; Fusus grimaldii var. major Locard, 1897; Meyeria decorata Locard, 1897; Meyeria decorata var. ecaudata Locard, 1897

= Amiantofusus amiantus =

Species of gastropod

Amiantofusus amiantus is a species of sea snail, a marine gastropod mollusc in the family Fasciolariidae, the spindle snails, the tulip snails and their allies.

== Description ==
The length of the shell attains 17 mm, its diameter 6.6 mm.

(Original description) The shell is pure white with a straw-colored protoconch and consists of ten whorls. The spire is rather acute, with the whorls obliquely smoothed in front of the sutures. The protoconch is composed of four whorls, smooth on the upper portion and adorned below with semilunar transverse ripples and a basal carina.

The spiral sculpture consists of very fine spiral threads, subtly intersected by wavy growth lines. Additionally, two strong threads are present near the periphery, one of which is obscured by the suture, while the body whorl displays three more prominent anterior threads alongside the typical spiral sculpture of the canal. These strong threads become increasingly prominent, sharply keeled, and more defined as they cross over the transverse riblets.

The transverse sculpture features eight rounded ribs that emerge near the periphery, extending across it and onto the base, where they intersect the spiral sculpture. The suture is appressed and wavy, with the absence of ribs near the suture and the flattening of the shell giving this species a somewhat the appearance of a Pleurotoma, although no notch is present. The spihonal canal is moderate in length and distinctly twisted. The aperture is smooth on the interior, with sharp, simple edges.

== Distribution ==
This marine species occurs in the Gulf of Mexico.
