= Nassarius striatulus =

Scientific classification
- Kingdom: Animalia
- Phylum: Mollusca
- Class: Gastropoda
- Subclass: Caenogastropoda
- Order: Neogastropoda
- Family: Nassariidae
- Genus: Nassarius
- Species: N. striatulus

Binomial name
- Nassarius striatulus (Eichwald, 1829)

Synonyms
- Buccinum hoernesi Mayer, 1864 †; Buccinum inconstans Hoernes & Auinger, 1882 †; Buccinum intermedium de Cristofori & Jan, 1832 †; Buccinum striatulum Eichwald, 1829 † (original combination); Hinia (Hinia) pseudocostulata Venzo & Pelosio, 1963 †; Nassa (Amycla) dertonensis Bellardi, 1882 †; Nassa (Amycla) dertonensis var. crebresulcata Sacco, 1904 †; Nassa (Amycla) dertonensis var. minutipercostata Sacco, 1904 †; Nassa (Amycla) dertonensis var. miopliocenica Sacco, 1904 †; Nassa (Amycla) dertonensis var. subcostulata Sacco, 1904 †; Nassa (Amycla) dertonensis var. ventrisulcata Sacco, 1904 †; Nassa (Amyclina) dertonensis Bellardi, 1882 †; Nassa (Amyclina) dertonensis italicistria Ruggieri, 1949 †; Nassa (Amyclina) dertonensis neogigas Ruggieri, 1949 †; Nassa (Telasco) restitutiana Fontannes, 1879 †; Nassa (Telasco) restitutiana var. tauromontis Sacco, 1904 †; Nassa costulata var. restitutiana Fontannes, 1879 †; Nassa dertonensis Bellardi, 1882 †; Nassa semistriata var. cabrierensis P. Fischer & Tournouer, 1873 †; Nassa semistriata var. turrita Foresti, 1868 †; Nassarius (Nassarius) cabrierensis cabrierensis Fontannes, F., 1878

Species of gastropod

Nassarius striatulus is an extinct species of sea snail, a marine gastropod mollusk in the family Nassariidae, the Nassa mud snails or dog whelks.

== Subspecies ==
- Nassarius striatulus striatulus (Eichwald, 1829) †
- Nassarius cabrierensis ovoideus (Locard, 1886) is a synonym of Tritia ovoidea (Locard, 1886)

== Description ==
The length of the shell attains 12 mm (0.47 in).

== Distribution ==
This species occurs in the Atlantic Ocean off the Western Sahara.
