= Nassarius consensus =

Scientific classification
- Kingdom: Animalia
- Phylum: Mollusca
- Class: Gastropoda
- Subclass: Caenogastropoda
- Order: Neogastropoda
- Family: Nassariidae
- Genus: Nassarius
- Species: N. consensus

Binomial name
- Nassarius consensus (Ravenel, 1861)

Synonyms
- Alectrion consensa (Ravenel, 1861); Alectrion consensa harveyensis Mansfield, 1930; Alectrion consensa leonensis Mansfield, 1930; Nassa consensa Ravenel, 1861 (basionym); Nassarius (Nassarius) consensus (Ravenel, 1861); Nassarius (Uzita) fargoi Olsson & Harbison, 1953

Species of gastropod

Nassarius consensus, common name: the striate nassa, is a species of sea snail, a marine gastropod mollusk in the family Nassariidae, the Nassa mud snails or dog whelks.

== Description ==
The length of the shell varies between 8 mm and 15 mm.

== Distribution ==
This species occurs in the Gulf of Mexico, the Caribbean Sea. and the Lesser Antilles; in the Atlantic Ocean off North Carolina and South Carolina, USA.
