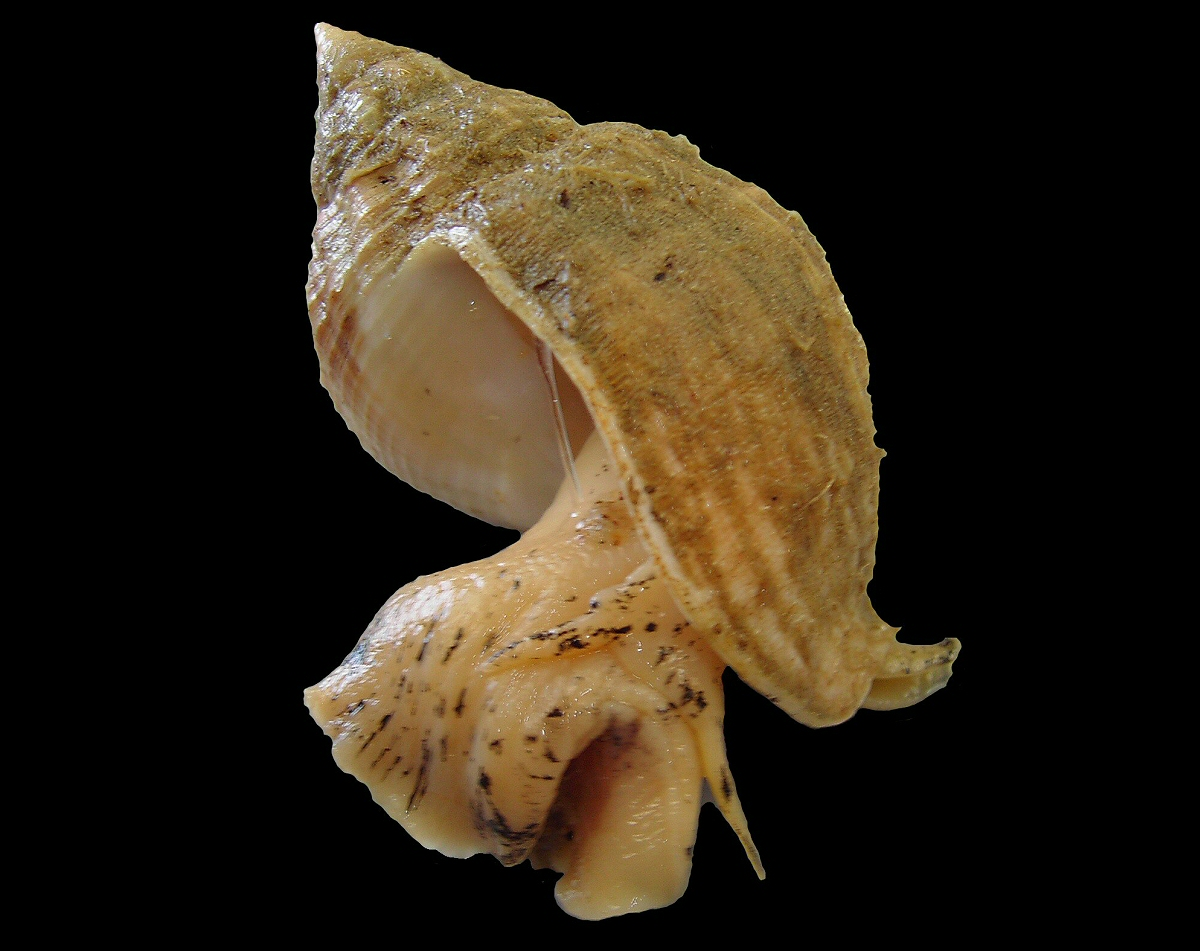
- A live individual of Buccinum undatum being held above the substrate

Scientific classification
- Kingdom: Animalia
- Phylum: Mollusca
- Class: Gastropoda
- Subclass: Caenogastropoda
- Order: Neogastropoda
- Superfamily: Buccinoidea
- Family: Buccinidae
- Genus: Buccinum; Linnaeus, 1758

Type species
- Buccinum undatum Linnaeus, 1758

Synonyms
- Bathybuccinum Golikov & Sirenko, 1988; Mada Jeffreys, 1867 (Invalid: junior homonym of Mada Mulsant, 1850; Mala and Madiella are replacement names); Madiella Wenz, 1943 (Replacement name for Mada Jeffreys, 1867); Mala Cossmann, 1901 (Replacement name for Mada Jeffreys, 1867, but itself a junior homonym of Mala Distant, 1854); Nassa (Buccinum) Linnaeus, 1758; Ovulatibuccinum A. N. Golikov & Sirenko, 1988; Reticubuccinum Ito & Habe, 1980; Tritonellium Valenciennes, 1858 (unnecessary replacement name for Tritonium O. F. Müller, 1776, by Valenciennes considered a homonym of Tritonia Cuvier); Tritonium O. F. Müller, 1776; Tritonium (Buccinum) Linnaeus, 1758

= Buccinum =

Genus of gastropods

Buccinum is a genus of medium-sized sea snails, marine gastropod molluscs in the family Buccinidae, the true whelks.

Snails in this genus are commonly called whelks, a name shared with several related and unrelated species. The common whelk Buccinum undatum is the most common representative of the genus in the northern Atlantic Ocean.

== Description ==
The shell is ovate or ovate-conical and elongated. The spire is moderate and pointed. The aperture is oval or oblong with a deep notch anteriorly and without a siphonal canal. The columella is plain, not flattened, swollen above, and often covered with a wide and flattened calcareous callosity, of more diaphanous substance. There sometimes exists a fold at the base of the columella. The outer lip is plain, quite thin, sometimes recurved, and forming a margin on the exterior. The thin, horny operculum is ovate and concentrically striate.

The soft body is elongated and spiral. The foot almost always considerable and subelliptical. It is shielded or two-lobed before, emarginated behind, bearing an operculum. The mantle is simple and forms a thin-edged flap over the branchial cavity. It is provided with a branchial siphon, projecting, thick, very long and dorsal, issuing from the emargination at the base of the shell. The head is rather thick, furnished with two conical, depressed tentacles supporting the eyes upon the outer side, (sometimes the eyes do not exist, but this case is extremely rare) . The mouth is provided with a retractile trunk, armed with minute teeth. The radula acts as a rasp. The sexes are separate. The love dart of the male is considerable, without an exterior furrow at its base.

All animals are carnivores and scavengers, feeding on dead or damaged marine animals. They are provided with a cylindrical trunk, susceptible of being much elongated or of being concealed entirely within the body. This trunk is armed at its extremity with beaks, which enable the animal to pierce the shell of other molluscs and crustaceans, upon which it preys.

The sexes are separate. The shells of the males are generally smaller, and less inflated than those of the females. The males are provided with a very large love dart, i.e. an exciting appendage, which, in a state of repose, is situated under the right edge of the mantle.

The eggs are generally united together. They are sometimes driven and transported by the waves to distances far removed from the places where they had been deposited; whence the same species of Buccinum are often found in very different climates.

== Distribution ==
The whelks are met with in all seas, especially upon rocks, where they occur in large numbers. The warmest climates furnish the species most brilliant in coloring. Some species serve for food to the inhabitants of many countries, particularly upon the shores of the English Channel and the North Sea.

== Species ==
Species in the genus Buccinum include:

- Buccinum abyssorum A.E. Verrill, 1884 - shingled whelk
- Buccinum acuminulatum Golikov, 1980
- Buccinum acutispiratum Dall, 1907
- Buccinum aleuticum Dall, 1895
- Buccinum alveolatum Kiener, 1834
- Buccinum angulosum J.E. Gray, 1839 - angular whelk
  - Buccinum angulosum angulosum J.E. Gray, 1838 - angular whelk
- Buccinum aniwanum Dall, 1907
- Buccinum araitonum Tiba, 1981
- Buccinum argillaceum Golikov & Gulbin, 1977
- Buccinum baerii (Middendorff, 1848)
  - Buccinum baerii baerii (Middendorff, 1848)
  - Buccinum baerii polium Dall, 1907
- Buccinum bayani (Jousseaume, 1883)
- Buccinum belcheri Reeve, 1855
- Buccinum beringense Golikov, 1980
- Buccinum bicordatum (Golikov & Sirenko, 1988)
- Buccinum bizikovi Kantor, Sirenko, Zvonareva & Fedosov, 2022
- Buccinum bombycinum Dall, 1907
- Buccinum bulimuloideum Dall, 1907
- Buccinum byssinum Tiba, 1983
- Buccinum cascadiense R. N. Clark, 2022
- Buccinum castaneum Dall, 1877
- Buccinum chartium Dall, 1919
- Buccinum chinoi Kantor, Sirenko, Zvonareva & Fedosov, 2022
- Buccinum chishimananux Habe, T. & Ito, 1965
- Buccinum chishimanum Pilsbry, 1904
- Buccinum ciliatum Fabricius, 1780
- Buccinum clarki (Kantor & Harasewych, 1998)
- Buccinum cnismatopleura Dall, 1919
- Buccinum cnismatum Dall, 1907
- Buccinum conoideum G.O. Sars, 1878
- Buccinum costatum Golikov, 1980: junior homonym, invalid: junior homonym of Buccinum costatum Linnaeus, 1758; B. gulbini is a replacement name )
- Buccinum crebricarinatum Lus, 1978
- Buccinum crebricostatum Lus, 1978: erroneous spelling of original name by Golikov (1980))
- Buccinum crenatum Golikov & Gulbin, 1977
- Buccinum cristatum Golikov & Sirenko, 1988
- Buccinum cyaneum Bruguiere, 1792 - bluish whelk
  - Buccinum cyaneum cyaneum Bruguiere, 1792 - bluish whelk
  - Buccinum cyaneum patulum G.O. Sars, 1878 - bluish whelk
  - Buccinum cyaneum perdix Mörch, 1868 - bluish whelk
- Buccinum denseplicatum Golikov, 1980
- Buccinum diplodetum Dall, 1907
- Buccinum donovani J. E. Gray, 1839
- Buccinum ectomycina Dall, 1907
- Buccinum elegantum Golikov & Gulbin, 1977
- Buccinum epifragilum Tiba, 1983
- Buccinum epistomium Dall, 1907
- Buccinum eugrammatum Dall, 1907 - lirate whelk
- Buccinum fedosovi Kantor & Sirenko, 2024
- Buccinum felis Okutani, 1964
- Buccinum fimbriatum (Golikov & Sirenko, 1988)
- Buccinum finmarkianum Verkrüzen, 1875
- Buccinum flavidum Golikov, 1980
- Buccinum fragile G. O. Sars, 1878
- Buccinum frausseni Alexeyev & Gornichnykh, 2009
- Buccinum fringillum Dall, 1877 - finch whelk
- Buccinum frustulatum Golikov, 1980
- Buccinum fukureum Habe & Ito, 1976
- Buccinum gadusensis Fraussen & Terryn, 2021
- Buccinum glaciale Linnaeus, 1761 - glacial whelk
- Buccinum golikovi Kantor, Sirenko, Zvonareva & Fedosov, 2022
- Buccinum gulbini Kantor, Sirenko, Zvonareva & Fedosov, 2022
- Buccinum habui Tiba, 1984
- Buccinum hasegawai Kantor, Sirenko, Zvonareva & Fedosov, 2022
- Buccinum hertzensteini Verkruzen, 1882
- Buccinum higuchii (Fraussen & Chino, 2009)
- Buccinum hosoyai Habe & Ito, 1965
- Buccinum humphreysianum Bennett, 1825
- Buccinum hydrophanum Hancock, 1846
- Buccinum isaotakii Kira, 1962
- Buccinum japonicum A. Adams, 1861
- Buccinum jeffreysii Smith, 1875
- Buccinum kadiakense Dall, 1907
- Buccinum kashimanum Okutani, 1964
- Buccinum kawamurai Habe & Ito, 1965
- Buccinum kinukatsugai Habe & Ito, 1968
- Buccinum kjennerudae Bouchet & Warén, 1985
- Buccinum kobjakovae Golikov & Sirenko, 1988
- Buccinum koreana Choe, Yoon & Habe, 1992
- Buccinum koshikinum Okutani in Okutani, Tagawa & Horikawa, 1988
- Buccinum kosyanae Kantor & Sirenko, 2024
- Buccinum kurilense Golikov & Sirenko, 1988
- Buccinum kushiroense Habe & Ito, 1976
- Buccinum lamelliferum Lus, 1976
- Buccinum leucostoma Lischke, 1872
- Buccinum limnoideum Dall, 1907
- Buccinum lischkeanum Loebbecke, 1881
- Buccinum longifiliare Tiba, 1983
- Buccinum lyperum Dall, 1919
- Buccinum macleani R. N. Clark, 2019
- Buccinum maehirai Tiba, 1980
- Buccinum maltzani Pfeffer, 1886
- Buccinum micropoma Thorson, 1944 - berry whelk
- Buccinum middendorfii Verkruzen, 1882
- Buccinum mirandum Smith, 1875
- Buccinum miyauchii Azuma, 1972
- Buccinum mizutanii Habe & Ito, 1970
- Buccinum mysticum Shikama, 1963
- Buccinum niponense Dall, 1907
- Buccinum nivale Friele, 1882
- Buccinum nodocostum Tiba, 1984
- Buccinum normale Dall, 1885
- Buccinum oblitum Sykes, 1911
- Buccinum obsoletum Golikov, 1980
- Buccinum ochotense (Middendorff, 1848) - Okhotsk whelk
- Buccinum oedematum Dall, 1907 - swollen whelk, swollen whelk
- Buccinum opisoplectum Dall, 1907
- Buccinum osagawai Habe & Ito, 1968
- Buccinum ovulum Dall, 1895
- Buccinum parvulum Verkrüzen, 1875
- Buccinum pemphigus Dall, 1907
  - Buccinum pemphigus major Dall, 1919
  - Buccinum pemphigus orotundum Dall, 1907
  - Buccinum pemphigus pemphigus Dall, 1907
- † Buccinum pengaronense O. Boettger, 1875
- Buccinum percrassum Dall, 1883 - crude whelk
- Buccinum physematum Dall, 1919
- Buccinum pilosum Golikov & Gulbin, 1977
- Buccinum planeticum Dall, 1919 - wandering whelk
- Buccinum plectrum Stimpson, 1865 - sinuous whelk
- Buccinum polare J.E. Gray, 1839 - polar whelk
- Buccinum polium Dall, 1907
- Buccinum pulchellum G.O. Sars, 1878
- Buccinum rarusum Tiba, 1984
- Buccinum rondinum Dall, 1919
- Buccinum rossellinum Dall, 1919
- Buccinum rossicum Dall, 1907
- Buccinum sagamianum Okutani, 1977
- Buccinum sakhalinense Dall, 1907
- Buccinum scalariforme Moller, 1842 - ladder whelk
- Buccinum schantaricum (Middendorff, 1848)
- Buccinum shiretokoensis Habe & Ito, 1976
- Buccinum sigmatopleura Dall, 1907
- Buccinum simplex (Middendorff, 1848)
- Buccinum simulatum Dall, 1907
- Buccinum solidum Golikov & Sirenko, 1988
- Buccinum striatellum Golikov, 1980
- Buccinum striatissimum G.B. Sowerby III, 1899
- Buccinum strigillatum Dall, 1891
- Buccinum subreticulatum Habe & Ito, 1965
- Buccinum superangulare Thorson & Oskarsson in Oskarsson, 1962
- Buccinum suzumai Habe & Ito, 1980
- Buccinum takagawai Habe & Ito, 1972
- Buccinum tanguaryi Baker, 1919
- Buccinum tenellum Dall, 1883
- Buccinum tenuissimum Kuroda in Teramachi, 1933
- Buccinum tenuisulcatum Golikov & Gulbin, 1977
- Buccinum terebriforme Habe & Ito, 1980
- Buccinum terraenovae (Beck in Mörch, 1869)
- Buccinum thermophilum Harasewych & Kantor, 2002
- Buccinum trescostatum Tiba, 1980
- Buccinum tsubai Kuroda, 1933
- Buccinum tumidulum G.O. Sars, 1878
- Buccinum tunicatum Golikov & Gulbin, 1977
- Buccinum undatum Linnaeus, 1758 - waved whelk
- Buccinum unicordatum (Golikov & Sirenko, 1988)
- Buccinum unuscarinatum Tiba, 1981
- Buccinum verkruzeni Kobelt, 1882
- Buccinum violaceum Quoy & Gaimard, 1832 (nomen dubium)
- Buccinum viridum Dall, 1889 - turban whelk, turban whelk
- Buccinum wakuii Ito & Habe, 1980
- Buccinum yadai (Fraussen & Chino, 2009)
- Buccinum yokomaruae Yamashita & Habe, 1965
- Buccinum yoroianum Ozaki, 1958
- Buccinum zelotes Dall, 1907

== Species brought into synonymy ==
This is a long list because, originally, all species resembling a Buccinum were categorized in this genus. Most of them have become synonyms in the course of time.

Synonyms
- Buccinum abbreviatum Gmelin, 1791: synonym of Demoulia abbreviata (Gmelin, 1791)
- Buccinum achatinum Lamarck, 1816: synonym of Bullia digitalis (Dillwyn, 1817)
- Buccinum acicula O. F. Müller, 1774: synonym of Cecilioides acicula (O. F. Müller, 1774)
- Buccinum aciculatum Gmelin, 1791: synonym of Hastula solida (Deshayes, 1857)
- Buccinum aciculatum Lamarck, 1822: synonym of Mazatlania cosentini (Philippi, 1836)
- Buccinum acuminatum Menke, 1843: synonym of Mitrella menkeana (Reeve, 1858)
- Buccinum acuminatum Broderip, 1830: synonym of Buccinum undatum Linnaeus, 1758
- Buccinum acutecostatum Philippi, 1844: synonym of Amphissa acutecostata (Philippi, 1844)
- Buccinum acute-costatum Philippi, 1844: synonym of Amphissa acutecostata (Philippi, 1844)
- Buccinum adspersum Bruguière, 1789: synonym of Cominella adspersa (Bruguière, 1789)
- Buccinum aethiops Reeve, 1847: synonym of Macron aethiops (Reeve, 1847)
- Buccinum affinis Lesson, 1842: synonym of Cominella adspersa (Bruguière, 1789)
- Buccinum afrum Philippi, 1851: synonym of Nassarius coronulus (A. Adams, 1852)
- Buccinum albescens Dunker, 1846: synonym of Nassarius albescens (Dunker, 1846)
- Buccinum albozonatum Watson, 1886: synonym of Falsimohnia albozonata (Watson, 1886)
- Buccinum aleuticum Dall, 1895 - Aleut whelk: synonym of Japelion aleuticus (Dall, 1895)
- Buccinum alicei Dautzenberg & Fischer H., 1912: synonym of Buccinum nivale Friele, 1882
- Buccinum allium Dillwyn, 1817: synonym of Tonna allium (Dillwyn, 1817)
- † Buccinum altile Conrad, 1832: synonym of † Ptychosalpinx altilis (Conrad, 1832)
- Buccinum amaliae Verkruzen, 1878: synonym of Buccinum undatum Linnaeus, 1758
- Buccinum ambiguum Pulteney, 1799: synonym of Nassarius ambiguus (Pulteney, 1799): synonym of Nassarius antillarum (d'Orbigny, 1847): synonym of Phrontis antillara (d'Orbigny, 1847)
- Buccinum ampullaceum Deshayes, 1844: synonym of Buccinanops globulosus (Kiener, 1834)
- Buccinum ancillariaeforme Grateloup, 1834: synonym of † Cyllenina ancillariaeformis (Grateloup, 1834)
- Buccinum anglicanum Gmelin, 1791: synonym of Burnupena papyracea (Bruguière, 1789)
- Buccinum anglicum Röding, 1798: synonym of Nassarius reticulatus (Linnaeus, 1758): synonym of Tritia reticulata (Linnaeus, 1758)
- Buccinum annulatum Lamarck, 1816: synonym of Bullia annulata (Lamarck, 1816)
- Buccinum antillarum Philippi, 1849: synonym of Nassarius vibex (Say, 1822): synonym of Phrontis vibex (Say, 1822)
- Buccinum aquilarum Watson, 1882: synonym of Gymnobela aquilarum (Watson, 1882)
- Buccinum arcularia Linnaeus, 1758: synonym of Nassarius arcularia (Linnaeus, 1758)
- Buccinum areolatum Link, 1807: synonym of Babylonia areolata (Link, 1807)
- Buccinum armatum Wood, 1828: synonym of Mexacanthina lugubris (Sowerby, 1821)
- Buccinum ascanias Bruguière, 1789: synonym of Nassarius incrassatus (Strøm, 1768): synonym of Tritia incrassata (Strøm, 1768)
- Buccinum assimile Reeve, 1846: synonym of Pollia assimilis (Reeve, 1846)
- Buccinum atractodeum Locard, 1887: synonym of Buccinum humphreysianum Bennett, 1824
- Buccinum atrum Schrank, 1803: synonym of Stagnicola atra (Schrank, 1803)
- Buccinum aurantium Lamarck, 1822: synonym of Anachis aurantia (Lamarck, 1822)
- Buccinum australe Menke, 1843: synonym of Nassarius pauperatus (Lamarck, 1822)
- Buccinum australe Gmelin, 1791: synonym of Phasianella australis (Gmelin, 1791)
- Buccinum avellana Reeve, 1846: synonym of Cronia avellana (Reeve, 1846)
- Buccinum avenacea Lesson, 1842: synonym of Cronia avenacea (Lesson, 1842)
- Buccinum bellangeri Kiener, 1834: synonym of Bullia tranquebarica (Röding, 1798)
- Buccinum bezoar Linnaeus, 1767: synonym of Rapana bezoar (Linnaeus, 1767)
- Buccinum biarmatum Dillwyn, 1817: synonym of Casmaria ponderosa (Gmelin, 1791)
- Buccinum bicostatum Bruguière, 1789: synonym of Haustrum lacunosum (Bruguière, 1789)
- Buccinum bifasciatum Dillwyn, 1817: synonym of Impages hectica (Linnaeus, 1758): synonym of Hastula hectica (Linnaeus, 1758)
- Buccinum bimucronatum Reeve, 1846: synonym of Orania bimucronata (Reeve, 1846)
- Buccinum boreale Broderip & Sowerby G.B. I, 1829: synonym of Buccinum ciliatum (Fabricius, 1780)
- Buccinum boucheti Tiba, 1984: synonym of Buccinum kashimanum Okutani, 1964
- Buccinum brasilianum Lamarck, 1822: synonym of Hinea brasiliana Lamarck, 1822
- Buccinum brevidentatum Wood, 1828: synonym of Acanthais brevidentata (W. Wood, 1828)
- Buccinum britanicum Röding, 1798: synonym of Burnupena papyracea (Bruguière, 1789)
- Buccinum bromsi Hägg, 1904: synonym of Buccinum cyaneum Bruguière, 1792
- Buccinum bronnii Philippi, 1849: synonym of Nassarius coronatus (Bruguière, 1789)
- Buccinum brucei Melvill & Standen, 1900: synonym of Colus verkruezeni (Kobelt, 1876): synonym of Anomalisipho verkruezeni (Kobelt, 1876)
- Buccinum brunneum Donovan, 1804: synonym of Chauvetia brunnea (Donovan, 1804)
- Buccinum bulbosum Dillwyn, 1817: synonym of Rapana rapiformis (Born, 1778)
- Buccinum burchardi Philippi, 1849: synonym of Nassarius burchardi (Philippi, 1849): synonym of Tritia burchardi (Philippi, 1849)
- Buccinum calcar Bruguière, 1789: synonym of Acanthina monodon (Pallas, 1774)
- Buccinum callosum W. Wood, 1828: synonym of Bullia callosa (W. Wood, 1828)
- Buccinum calmeilii Payraudeau, 1826: synonym of Nassarius corniculum (Olivi, 1792): synonym of Tritia corniculum (Olivi, 1792)
- Buccinum canaliculatum Lamarck, 1822: synonym of Nassarius siquijorensis (A. Adams, 1852)
- Buccinum canariense d'Orbigny, 1840: synonym of Mitrella pallaryi (Dautzenberg, 1927)
- Buccinum cancellarioides Reeve, 1847: synonym of Xymenopsis muriciformis (King, 1832)
- Buccinum cancellatum Quoy & Gaimard, 1833: synonym of Phos textus (Gmelin, 1791)
- Buccinum candidissimum C. B. Adams, 1845: synonym of Nassarius candidissimus (C. B. Adams, 1845): synonym of Phrontis candidissima (C. B. Adams, 1845)
- Buccinum candidissimum Philippi, 1836: synonym of Chauvetia candidissima (Philippi, 1836)
- Buccinum candidum Born, 1778: synonym of Terebra guttata (Röding, 1798)
- Buccinum canetae Clench & Aguayo, 1944: synonym of Gaillea canetae (Clench & Aguayo, 1944)
- Buccinum capense Dunker, 1846: synonym of Nassarius capensis (Dunker, 1846)
- Buccinum carinatum Phipps, 1774: synonym of Buccinum glaciale Linnaeus, 1761
- Buccinum cariniferum Küster, 1858: synonym of Pollia subcostata (Krauss, 1848)
- Buccinum cassideum G.B. Sowerby I, 1825: synonym of Demoulia abbreviata (Gmelin, 1791)
- Buccinum castaneum Dall, 1877: synonym of Volutopsion castaneum (Dall, 1877)
- Buccinum catarrhacta Gmelin, 1791: synonym of Burnupena catarrhacta (Gmelin, 1791)
- Buccinum caudatum Gmelin, 1791: synonym of Linatella caudata (Gmelin, 1791)
- † Buccinum cautleyi d'Archiac & Haime, 1854: synonym of † Nassarius cautleyi (d'Archiac & Haime, 1854)
- Buccinum cereale Krauss, 1848: synonym of Anachis kraussii (Sowerby I, 1844)
- Buccinum charcoti Lamy, 1910: synonym of Harpovoluta charcoti (Lamy, 1910)
- Buccinum chinense Dillwyn, 1817: synonym of Tonna chinensis (Dillwyn, 1817)
- Buccinum chrysostomum Röding, 1798: synonym of Nassarius reticulatus (Linnaeus, 1758): synonym of Tritia reticulata (Linnaeus, 1758)
- Buccinum cicatricosum Gmelin, 1791: synonym of Semicassis granulata (Born, 1778)
- Buccinum cinctum Röding, 1798: synonym of Burnupena cincta cincta (Röding, 1798) represented as Burnupena cincta (Röding, 1798)
- Buccinum cinereum Born, 1778: synonym of Impages cinerea (Born, 1778)
- Buccinum cingulatum Lamarck, 1816: synonym of Stramonita haemastoma (Linnaeus, 1767)
- Buccinum cingulatum Linnaeus, 1771: synonym of Trochia cingulata (Linnaeus, 1771)
- Buccinum elatior (Tryon, 1880): synonym of Buccinum scalariforme Møller, 1842
- Buccinum cinis Reeve, 1846: synonym of Engina cinis (Reeve, 1846)
- Buccinum citrinum Reeve, 1846: synonym of Buccinanops paytensis (Kiener, 1834)
- † Buccinum clathratum Born, 1778: synonym of † Nassarius clathratus (Born, 1778)
- Buccinum clathratum Wood, 1825: synonym of Nassarius conoidalis (Deshayes, 1832)
- Buccinum clathratum Kiener, 1834: synonym of Nassarius globosus (Quoy & Gaimard, 1833)
- Buccinum clathratum A. Adams & Reeve, 1850: synonym of Metula amosi Vanatta, 1913
- Buccinum clausiliforme Kiener, 1834: synonym of Aesopus clausiliformis (Kiener, 1834)
- Buccinum coccinella Lamarck, 1822: synonym of Nassarius incrassatus (Strøm, 1768): synonym of Tritia incrassata (Strøm, 1768)
- Buccinum cochlidium auct.: synonym of Buccinanops gradatus (Deshayes, 1844): synonym of Buccinanops cochlidium (Dillwyn, 1817)
- Buccinum cochlidium Dillwyn, 1817: synonym of Buccinanops cochlidium (Dillwyn, 1817)
- Buccinum commaculatum Gmelin, 1791: synonym of Cinguloterebra commaculata (Gmelin, 1791)
- Buccinum concholepas Bruguière, 1789: synonym of Concholepas concholepas (Bruguière, 1789)
- Buccinum concinnum Dillwyn, 1817: synonym of Hastula strigilata (Linnaeus, 1758)
- Buccinum concinnum Tiba, 1980: synonym of Buccinum kashimanum Okutani, 1964
- Buccinum concinnum C. B. Adams, 1845: synonym of Parvanachis obesa (C. B. Adams, 1845)
- † Buccinum conglobatum Brocchi, 1814: synonym of †Demoulia conglobata (Brocchi, 1814)
- Buccinum conoidale Deshayes, 1832: synonym of Nassarius conoidalis (Deshayes, 1832)
- Buccinum conspersum Philippi, 1849: synonym of Nassarius conspersus (Philippi, 1849): synonym of Tritia conspersa (Philippi, 1849)
- Buccinum contractum Reeve, 1846: synonym of Ergalatax contracta (Reeve, 1846)
- Buccinum corniculatum Lamarck, 1822: synonym of Mitrella scripta (Linnaeus, 1758)
- Buccinum corniculum Olivi, 1792: synonym of Nassarius corniculum (Olivi, 1792): synonym of Tritia corniculum (Olivi, 1792)
- Buccinum coromandelianum Lamarck, 1822: synonym of Gemophos auritulus (Link, 1807)
- Buccinum coronatum Bruguière, 1789: synonym of Nassarius coronatus (Bruguière, 1789)
- Buccinum coronatum Gmelin, 1791: synonym of Nassa serta (Bruguière, 1789)
- Buccinum coronatum Quoy & Gaimard, 1833: synonym of Nassarius distortus (A. Adams, 1852)
- Buccinum coronatum Golikov, 1980: junior homonym, invalid: junior homonym of Buccinum coronatum Bruguière, 1789, Gmelin, 1791, and B. coronatum Quoy & Gaimard, 1833; Buccinum golikovi is a replacement name): synonym of Buccinum golikovi Kantor, Sirenko, Zvonareva & Fedosov, 2022
- Buccinum corrugatum Reeve, 1847: synonym of Amphissa columbiana Dall, 1916
- † Buccinum corrugatum Brocchi, 1814: synonym of † Nassarius corrugatus (Brocchi, 1814)
- Buccinum costatum Linnaeus, 1758: synonym of Harpa costata (Linnaeus, 1758)
- † Buccinum costellatum Grateloup, 1845: synonym of † Lyrofusus costellatus (Grateloup, 1845)
- Buccinum costulatum Renieri, 1804: synonym of Nassarius cuvierii (Payraudeau, 1826): synonym of Tritia cuvierii (Payraudeau, 1826)
- Buccinum crassiusculum Nyst, 1845: synonym of Nassarius crassiusculus (Nyst, 1845)
- Buccinum crassum Gmelin, 1791: synonym of Pseudoliva crassa (Gmelin, 1791)
- Buccinum crassum Philippi, 1849: synonym of Nassarius semisulcatus (Hombron & Jacquinot, 1848)
- Buccinum crenulatum Linnaeus, 1758: synonym of Oxymeris crenulata (Linnaeus, 1758)
- Buccinum cribrarium Lamarck, 1822: synonym of Mitrella ocellata (Gmelin, 1791)
- Buccinum cruentatum Gmelin, 1791: synonym of Stramonita cruentata (Gmelin, 1791)
- Buccinum cumingii Powys, 1835: synonym of Tritonoturris cumingii (Powys, 1835)
- Buccinum cuvierii Payraudeau, 1826: synonym of Nassarius cuvierii (Payraudeau, 1826): synonym of Tritia cuvierii (Payraudeau, 1826)
- † Buccinum dalei J. Sowerby, 1825: synonym of † Liomesus dalei (Sowerby, 1825)
- Buccinum decussatum Linnaeus, 1758 : synonym of Phalium decussatum (Linnaeus, 1758)
- Buccinum decussatum Kiener, 1841 : synonym of Nassarius pagodus (Reeve, 1844) : synonym of Phrontis pagoda (Reeve, 1844)
- Buccinum deforme King, 1832 : synonym of Buccinanops deformis (King, 1832)
- Buccinum delalandii Kiener, 1834 : synonym of Burnupena catarrhacta (Gmelin, 1791)
- Buccinum dentatum Wood, 1818 : synonym of Acanthina unicornis (Bruguière, 1789)
- Buccinum dermestoideum Lamarck, 1822 : synonym of Pseudamycla dermestoidea (Lamarck, 1822)
- Buccinum dermestoideum Lamarck, 1822 sensu Payraudeau, 1826: synonym of Nassarius corniculum (Olivi, 1792) : synonym of Tritia corniculum (Olivi, 1792)
- Buccinum diadema Brocchi, 1814 † : synonym of Galeodea echinophora (Linnaeus, 1758)
- Buccinum digitale Dillwyn, 1817 : synonym of Bullia digitalis (Dillwyn, 1817)
- Buccinum dimidiatum Linnaeus, 1758 : synonym of Oxymeris dimidiata (Linnaeus, 1758)
- Buccinum dirum Reeve, 1846 : synonym of Lirabuccinum dirum (Reeve, 1846)
- Buccinum discors Risso, 1826 : synonym of Nassarius incrassatus (Strøm, 1768) : synonym of Tritia incrassata (Strøm, 1768)
- Buccinum distortum W. Wood, 1828 : synonym of Triumphis distorta (Wood, 1828)
- Buccinum dolium Linnaeus, 1758 : synonym of Tonna dolium (Linnaeus, 1758)
- Buccinum donovani Sars G.O., 1878 : synonym of Buccinum undatum Linnaeus, 1758
- Buccinum donovani Gray J.E., 1839 : synonym of Buccinum glaciale Linnaeus, 1761
- Buccinum dorbignyi Payraudeau, 1826 : synonym of Pollia dorbignyi (Payraudeau, 1826)
- Buccinum dorsatum Röding, 1798 : synonym of Nassarius dorsatus (Röding, 1798)
- Buccinum dunkeri Küster, 1858 : synonym of Burnupena catarrhacta (Gmelin, 1791)
- Buccinum duplicatum Linnaeus, 1758 : synonym of Duplicaria duplicata (Linnaeus, 1758)
- Buccinum echinophorum Linnaeus, 1758: synonym of Galeodea echinophora (Linnaeus, 1758)
- Buccinum edentulum Gmelin, 1791: synonym of Impages hectica (Linnaeus, 1758): synonym of Hastula hectica (Linnaeus, 1758)
- Buccinum ekblawi Baker, 1919: synonym of Buccinum glaciale Linnaeus, 1761
- Buccinum elatior (Middendorff, 1849): synonym of Buccinum scalariforme Møller, 1842
- Buccinum elegans Reeve, 1842: synonym of Nassarius fossatus (Gould, 1850)
- Buccinum elegans O. G. Costa, 1830: synonym of Nassarius cuvierii (Payraudeau, 1826): synonym of Tritia cuvierii (Payraudeau, 1826)
- † Buccinum elegans Dujardin, 1837 †: synonym of † Nassarius spectabilis (Nyst, 1845)
- Buccinum elegans Kiener, 1834: synonym of Nassarius crassiusculus (Nyst, 1845)
- Buccinum elongatulum Anton, 1838: synonym of Bullia digitalis (Dillwyn, 1817)
- Buccinum elongatum Wood, 1828: synonym of Oxymeris strigata (G. B. Sowerby I, 1825)
- Buccinum erinaceus Linnaeus, 1758: synonym of Casmaria erinaceus (Linnaeus, 1758)
- Buccinum erythrostoma Reeve, 1846: synonym of Cantharus erythrostoma (Reeve, 1846)
- Buccinum euthriaeforme Paulus & Mars, 1942: synonym of Buccinum humphreysianum Bennett, 1824
- † Buccinum falconeri d'Archiac & Haime, 1854 †: synonym of †Nassarius falconeri (d'Archiac & Haime, 1854)
- Buccinum fasciatum (Martini, 1777): synonym of Tonna sulcosa (Born, 1778)
- Buccinum fasciatum Lamarck, 1822: synonym of Nassarius pyrrhus (Menke, 1843)
- Buccinum fasciculatum Reeve, 1846: synonym of Pisania fasciculata (Reeve, 1846)
- Buccinum fasciolatum Lamarck, 1822: synonym of Nassarius corniculum (Olivi, 1792): synonym of Tritia corniculum (Olivi, 1792)
- Buccinum felinum Dillwyn, 1817: synonym of Oxymeris felina (Dillwyn, 1817)
- Buccinum ferreum Reeve, 1847: synonym of Japeuthria ferrea (Reeve, 1847)
- Buccinum ferussaci Payraudeau, 1826: synonym of Nassarius cuvierii (Payraudeau, 1826): synonym of Tritia cuvierii (Payraudeau, 1826)
- Buccinum filiceum Crosse & Fischer, 1864: synonym of Cominella eburnea var. filicea (Crosse & Fischer, 1864): synonym of Cominella eburnea (Reeve, 1846)
- Buccinum filosum A. Adams & Reeve, 1850: synonym of Truncaria filosa (A. Adams & Reeve, 1850)
- Buccinum filosum Gmelin, 1791: synonym of Nucella lapillus (Linnaeus, 1758)
- Buccinum fimbriatum Martyn, 1784: synonym of Trophon geversianus (Pallas, 1774)
- Buccinum finmarchianum Verkrüzen, 1875: synonym of Buccinum finmarkianum Verkrüzen, 1875
- Buccinum flammeum Bruguière, 1789: synonym of Maxacteon flammeus (Bruguière, 1789)
- Buccinum flavulum Mörch, 1869: synonym of Buccinum ciliatum (Fabricius, 1780)
- Buccinum flavum Bruguière, 1789: synonym of Pyrene flava (Bruguière, 1789)
- Buccinum flexuosum Lamarck, 1822: synonym of Euplica scripta (Lamarck, 1822)
- Buccinum flexuosum Costa O.G., 1830: synonym of Nassarius cuvierii (Payraudeau, 1826): synonym of Tritia cuvierii (Payraudeau, 1826)
- Buccinum floridanum Petit de la Saussaye, 1856: synonym of Solenosteira cancellaria (Conrad, 1846)
- Buccinum floridanum Lesson, 1842: synonym of Anachis varia (G. B. Sowerby I, 1832)
- Buccinum foliorum Gmelin, 1791: synonym of Nassarius mutabilis (Linnaeus, 1758): synonym of Tritia mutabilis (Linnaeus, 1758)
- Buccinum foliosum Wood W., 1818: synonym of Nassarius mutabilis (Linnaeus, 1758): synonym of Tritia mutabilis (Linnaeus, 1758)
- Buccinum fossatum Gould, 1850: synonym of Nassarius fossatus (Gould, 1850)
- Buccinum foveolatum Dunker, 1847: synonym of Nassarius foveolatus (Dunker, 1847)
- Buccinum francolinus Bruguière, 1789: synonym of Nassa francolina (Bruguière, 1789)
- Buccinum frielei Pfeffer, 1886: synonym of Buccinum ciliatum (Fabricius, 1780)
- Buccinum fumosum Dillwyn, 1817: synonym of Pollia fumosa (Dillwyn, 1817)
- Buccinum fuscatum Bruguière, 1789: synonym of Pareuthria fuscata (Bruguière, 1789)
- Buccinum fusiforme Kiener, 1834: synonym of Buccinum humphreysianum Bennett, 1824
- Buccinum fusiforme Broderip, 1830: synonym of Turrisipho fenestratus (Turton, 1834)
- Buccinum gaillardoti Puton, 1856: synonym of Pollia dorbignyi (Payraudeau, 1826)
- Buccinum galea Linnaeus, 1758: synonym of Tonna galea (Linnaeus, 1758)
- Buccinum gayii Kiener, 1834: synonym of Nassarius gayii (Kiener, 1834)
- Buccinum gemma Philippi, 1849: synonym of Nassarius complanatus (Powys, 1835): synonym of Phrontis complanata (Powys, 1835)
- Buccinum gemmatum Reeve, 1846: synonym of Gemophos gemmatus (Reeve, 1846)
- Buccinum gemmulatum Lamarck, 1822: synonym of Nassarius conoidalis (Deshayes, 1832)
- Buccinum geversianum Pallas, 1774: synonym of Trophon geversianus (Pallas, 1774)
- Buccinum gibbosulum Linnaeus, 1758: synonym of Nassarius gibbosulus (Linnaeus, 1758)
- Buccinum gibbum Bruguière, 1789: synonym of Nassarius mutabilis (Linnaeus, 1758): synonym of Tritia mutabilis (Linnaeus, 1758)
- Buccinum giratum Röding, 1798: synonym of Babylonia zeylanica (Bruguière, 1789)
- Buccinum glaberrimum Gmelin, 1791: synonym of Nassarius pfeifferi (Philippi, 1844): synonym of Tritia pfeifferi (Philippi, 1844)
- Buccinum glabratum Linnaeus, 1758: synonym of Eburna glabrata (Linnaeus, 1758)
- Buccinum glabrum O. F. Müller, 1774: synonym of Omphiscola glabra (O. F. Müller, 1774) †
- Buccinum glans Linnaeus, 1758: synonym of Nassarius glans glans (Linnaeus, 1758): synonym of Nassarius glans (Linnaeus, 1758)
- Buccinum glaucum Linnaeus, 1758: synonym of Phalium glaucum (Linnaeus, 1758)
- Buccinum globosum Gmelin, 1791: synonym of Semicassis granulata (Born, 1778)
- Buccinum globosum Quoy & Gaimard, 1833: synonym of Nassarius globosus (Quoy & Gaimard, 1833)
- Buccinum globulosum Kiener, 1834: synonym of Buccinanops globulosus (Kiener, 1834)
- Buccinum glutinosum O. F. Müller, 1774: synonym of Myxas glutinosa (O. F. Müller, 1774)
- Buccinum gouldi Verrill, 1882: synonym of Buccinum cyaneum Bruguière, 1792
- Buccinum gouldii A.E. Verrill, 1882 synonym of Buccinum cyaneum Bruguière, 1792
- Buccinum gracile da Costa, 1778: synonym of Colus gracilis (da Costa, 1778)
- Buccinum gracile Settepassi, 1977: synonym of Buccinum humphreysianum Bennett, 1824
- Buccinum gracile Reeve, 1846: synonym of Prodotia lannumi (Schwengel, 1950)
- Buccinum gradatum Deshayes, 1844: synonym of Buccinanops cochlidium (Dillwyn, 1817)
- Buccinum grana Lamarck, 1822: synonym of Nassarius granum (Lamarck, 1822): synonym of Tritia grana (Lamarck, 1822)
- Buccinum graniferum Kiener, 1834: synonym of Nassarius graniferus (Kiener, 1834)
- † Buccinum graniferum Dujardin, 1837: synonym of † Nassarius turonensis (Deshayes, 1844)
- Buccinum granulatum Born, 1778: synonym of Semicassis granulata (Born, 1778)
- Buccinum griseum Brocchi, 1821: synonym of Planaxis savignyi Deshayes, 1844
- Buccinum gruneri Dunker, 1846: synonym of Nassarius gruneri (Dunker, 1846)
- Buccinum guillaini Petit de la Saussaye, 1850: synonym of Cyllene grayi Reeve, 1846
- Buccinum gussonii Calcara, 1845: synonym of Nassarius tinei (Maravigna, 1840)
- Buccinum haemastoma Linnaeus, 1767: synonym of Stramonita haemastoma (Linnaeus, 1767)
- Buccinum haldemani Dunker, 1847: synonym of Nassarius haldemani (Dunker, 1847)
- Buccinum haldemanni [sic]: synonym of Nassarius haldemani (Dunker, 1847)
- Buccinum hancocki Mörch, 1857: synonym of Buccinum glaciale Linnaeus, 1761
- Buccinum harpa Linnaeus, 1758: synonym of Harpa harpa (Linnaeus, 1758)
- Buccinum hastatum Gmelin, 1791: synonym of Hastula hastata (Gmelin, 1791)
- Buccinum haustorium Gmelin, 1791: synonym of Haustrum haustorium (Gmelin, 1791)
- Buccinum hecticum Linnaeus, 1758: synonym of Hastula hectica (Linnaeus, 1758)
- Buccinum hepaticum Montagu, 1803: synonym of Nassarius nitidus (Jeffreys, 1867)
- Buccinum hinnulus Adams & Reeve, 1850: synonym of Siphonalia hinnulus (A. Adams & Reeve, 1850)
- Buccinum hirasei Pilsbry, 1901: synonym of Japelion hirasei (Pilsbry, 1901)
- Buccinum hirtum Kiener, 1834: synonym of Nassarius hirtus (Kiener, 1834)
- Buccinum horridum Dunker, 1847: synonym of Nassarius horridus (Dunker, 1847)
- Buccinum igneum Gmelin, 1791: synonym of Pisania ignea (Gmelin, 1791)
- Buccinum inclitum Pilsbry, 1904: synonym of Buccinum glaciale Linnaeus, 1761
- Buccinum inclytum Pilsbry, 1904: synonym of Buccinum glaciale Linnaeus, 1761
- Buccinum incrassatum Strøm, 1768: synonym of Nassarius incrassatus (Strøm, 1768): synonym of Tritia incrassata (Strøm, 1768)
- Buccinum inexhaustum Verkruzen, 1878 : synonym of Buccinum finmarkianum Verkrüzen, 1875
- Buccinum inflatum Aradas & Benoit, 1876: synonym of Buccinum humphreysianum Bennett, 1824
- Buccinum inflatum Lamarck, 1822: synonym of Nassarius mutabilis (Linnaeus, 1758): synonym of Tritia mutabilis (Linnaeus, 1758)
- Buccinum intinctum Reeve, 1846: synonym of Burnupena papyracea (Bruguière, 1789)
- Buccinum iris Lightfoot, 1786: synonym of Turrilatirus iris (Lightfoot, 1786)
- Buccinum isabellei d'Orbigny, 1839: synonym of Anachis isabellei (d'Orbigny, 1839)
- Buccinum jacksonianum Quoy & Gaimard, 1833: synonym of Nassarius jacksonianus (Quoy & Gaimard, 1833)
- Buccinum jacksonianum Kiener, 1834: synonym of Nassarius pyrrhus (Menke, 1843)
- Buccinum jaspideum Link, 1807: synonym of Nassarius mutabilis (Linnaeus, 1758): synonym of Tritia mutabilis (Linnaeus, 1758)
- Buccinum jonasii Dunker, 1846: synonym of Nassarius jonasii Dunker, 1846
- Buccinum kennicotti [sic]: synonym of Beringius kennicottii (Dall, 1871)
- Buccinum kennicottii Dall, 1871: synonym of Beringius kennicottii (Dall, 1871)
- Buccinum kieneri Monterosato, 1872: synonym of Buccinum humphreysianum Bennett, 1824
- Buccinum kieneri Anton, 1838: synonym of Nassarius kieneri (Anton, 1838)
- Buccinum kochianum Dunker, 1846: synonym of Nassarius kochianus (Dunker, 1846)
- Buccinum kraussianum Dunker, 1846: synonym of Nassarius kraussianus (Dunker, 1846)
- † Buccinum labiatum J. Sowerby, 1823: synonym of † Editharus labiatus (J. Sowerby, 1823)
- † Buccinum labiosum J. de C. Sowerby, 1824: synonym of † Nassarius labiosus (J. de C. Sowerby, 1824)
- Buccinum lacepedii Payraudeau, 1826: synonym of Nassarius incrassatus (Strøm, 1768): synonym of Tritia incrassata (Strøm, 1768)
- Buccinum laciniatus sensu Martyn Dillwyn, 1817: synonym of Trophon plicatus (Lightfoot, 1786)
- Buccinum lacteum Kiener, 1834: synonym of Pyrene obtusa (Sowerby I, 1832)
- Buccinum lacunosum Bruguière, 1789: synonym of Haustrum lacunosum (Bruguière, 1789)
- Buccinum laeve (Kuroda & Habe in Habe, 1961): synonym of Antillophos laevis (Kuroda & Habe in Habe, 1961)
- Buccinum laevigatum Linnaeus, 1758: synonym of Rhombinella laevigata (Linnaeus, 1758)
- Buccinum laevigatum Lamarck, 1816: synonym of Bullia laevissima (Gmelin, 1791)
- Buccinum laevissimum Gmelin, 1791: synonym of Bullia laevissima (Gmelin, 1791)
- Buccinum lamarckii Kiener, 1834: synonym of Buccinanops cochlidium (Dillwyn, 1817)
- Buccinum lamellatum Gmelin, 1791: synonym of Boreotrophon clathratus (Linnaeus, 1767)
- Buccinum lamellosa Gmelin, 1791: synonym of Nucella lamellosa (Gmelin, 1791)
- Buccinum lanceatum Linnaeus, 1767: synonym of Hastula lanceata (Linnaeus, 1767)
- Buccinum lapillus Linnaeus, 1758: synonym of Nucella lapillus (Linnaeus, 1758)
- Buccinum latescens Schröter in Martini, 1788: synonym of Tonna allium (Dillwyn, 1817)
- Buccinum lefebvrii Maravigna, 1840: synonym of Chauvetia lefebvrii (Maravigna, 1840)
- Buccinum leucozonum Philippi, 1844: synonym of Enginella leucozona (Philippi, 1844)
- Buccinum lima Dillwyn, 1817: synonym of Nassarius lima (Dillwyn, 1817)
- Buccinum lima Chemnitz, 1795: synonym of Nassarius lima (Dillwyn, 1817)
- Buccinum limatum Philippi, 1836: synonym of Nassarius lima (Dillwyn, 1817)
- Buccinum limatum Chemnitz, 1795: synonym of Nassarius lima (Dillwyn, 1817)
- Buccinum limnaeiforme Dunker, 1847: synonym of Nassarius limnaeiformis (Dunker, 1847)
- Buccinum linea Martyn, 1784: synonym of Buccinulum linea (Martyn, 1784)
- Buccinum lineatum Gmelin, 1791: synonym of Littoraria scabra (Linnaeus, 1758)
- Buccinum lineatum Röding, 1798: synonym of Nassarius glans (Linnaeus, 1758)
- Buccinum lineatum da Costa, 1778: synonym of Angiola lineata (da Costa, 1778)
- Buccinum lineolatum Lamarck, 1816: synonym of Cominella lineolata (Lamarck, 1809)
- Buccinum linnaei Payraudeau, 1826: synonym of Mitrella scripta (Linnaeus, 1758)
- Buccinum liocephalum Pallary, 1931: synonym of Buccinum humphreysianum Bennett, 1824
- Buccinum litiopa Quoy & Gaimard, 1833: synonym of Litiopa melanostoma Rang, 1829
- Buccinum littorinoides Reeve, 1846: synonym of Buccinulum vittatum vittatum (Quoy & Gaimard, 1833) represented as Buccinulum vittatum (Quoy & Gaimard, 1833)
- Buccinum livescens Philippi, 1849: synonym of Nassarius livescens (Philippi, 1849)
- Buccinum lividum Reeve, 1846: synonym of Orania livida (Reeve, 1846)
- Buccinum luctuosum Tapparone Canefri, 1880: synonym of Pisania luctuosa (Tapparone Canefri, 1880)
- Buccinum lugubre C. B. Adams, 1852: synonym of Trachypollia lugubris (C. B. Adams, 1852)
- Buccinum luridum Hutton, 1873: synonym of Cominella quoyana A. Adams, 1855
- Buccinum lusitanicum Pallary, 1931: synonym of Buccinum humphreysianum Bennett, 1824
- Buccinum luteolum Chenu, 1845: synonym of Oxymeris crenulata (Linnaeus, 1758)
- Buccinum luteostoma Holten, 1803: synonym of Reishia luteostoma (Holten, 1803)
- Buccinum lyratum Gmelin, 1791: synonym of Boreotrophon clathratus (Linnaeus, 1767)
- Buccinum lyratum Lamarck, 1822: synonym of Cyllene lamarcki Cernohorsky, 1975
- Buccinum macula Montagu, 1803: synonym of Nassarius incrassatus (Strøm, 1768): synonym of Tritia incrassata (Strøm, 1768)
- Buccinum maculatum Linnaeus, 1758: synonym of Oxymeris maculata (Linnaeus, 1758)
- Buccinum maculatum Martyn, 1784: synonym of Cominella adspersa (Bruguière, 1789)
- Buccinum maculosum Dillwyn, 1817: synonym of Tonna pennata (Mörch, 1853)
- Buccinum maculosum Martyn, 1784: synonym of Cominella maculosa (Martyn, 1784)
- Buccinum maculosum Röding, 1798: synonym of Babylonia areolata (Link, 1807)
- Buccinum maculosum Lamarck, 1822: synonym of Pisania striata (Gmelin, 1791)
- Buccinum magnum da Costa, 1778: synonym of Neptunea antiqua (Linnaeus, 1758)
- Buccinum margaritiferum Dunker, 1847: synonym of Nassarius margaritifer (Dunker, 1847)
- Buccinum marginatum Gmelin, 1791: synonym of Aspa marginata (Gmelin, 1791)
- Buccinum marginulatum Lamarck, 1822: synonym of Nassarius reticulatus (Linnaeus, 1758): synonym of Tritia reticulata (Linnaeus, 1758)
- Buccinum marmoratum Reeve, 1846: synonym of Prodotia iostoma (Gray, 1834)
- Buccinum melanoides Deshayes, 1832: synonym of Bullia melanoides (Deshayes, 1832)
- Buccinum meles Dillwyn, 1817: synonym of Casmaria erinaceus (Linnaeus, 1758)
- Buccinum melo Lesson, 1840: synonym of Cominella adspersa (Bruguière, 1789)
- Buccinum meridionale Verkrüzen, 1884: synonym of Buccinum undatum Linnaeus, 1758
- Buccinum microconcha Habe & Ito, 1965 : synonym of Buccinum jeffreysii Smith, 1875
- Buccinum midori Habe & ITO, 1965 synonym of Buccinum oedematum Dall, 1907
- Buccinum moerchi Friele, 1877 synonym of Buccinum sericatum Hancock, 1846
- Buccinum morchianum Dunker, 1858: synonym of Buccinum glaciale Linnaeus, 1761
- Buccinum orotundum Dall, 1907: synonym of Buccinum terraenovae Mörch, 1869
- Buccinum osseum Menke, 1829: synonym of Bullia osseum (Menke, 1829)
- Buccinum picturatum Dall, 1877 - painted whelk : synonym of Buccinum mirandum picturatum Dall, 1877
- Buccinum pulchrum Reeve, 1846: synonym of Engina pulchra (Reeve, 1846)
- Buccinum rhodium Dall, 1919: synonym of Buccinum scalariforme Møller, 1842
- Buccinum rubiginosum Reeve, 1846: synonym of Pollia rubiginosa (Reeve, 1846)
- Buccinum sandersoni A.E. Verrill, 1882 : synonym of Buccinum fragile G. O. Sars, 1878
- Buccinum sericatum Hancock, 1846 - silky whelk : synonym of Buccinum ciliatum sericatum
- Buccinum solenum Dall, 1919: synonym of Buccinum terraenovae Mörch, 1869
- Buccinum soyomaruae Okutani, 1977: synonym of Buccinum yoroianum Ozaki, 1958
- Buccinum taphrium Dall, 1891 : synonym of Sulcosinus taphrium (Dall, 1891)
- Buccinum tenebrosum Hancock, 1846 : synonym of Buccinum cyaneum Bruguière, 1792
- Buccinum totteni Stimpson, 1865 - thin whelk, synonym of Buccinum polare Gray, 1839
- Buccinum unicum Pilsbry, 1905: synonym of Clinopegma magnum unicum (Pilsbry, 1905)
- Buccinum zebra Wood, 1828: synonym of Anachis miser (G. B. Sowerby I, 1844)
