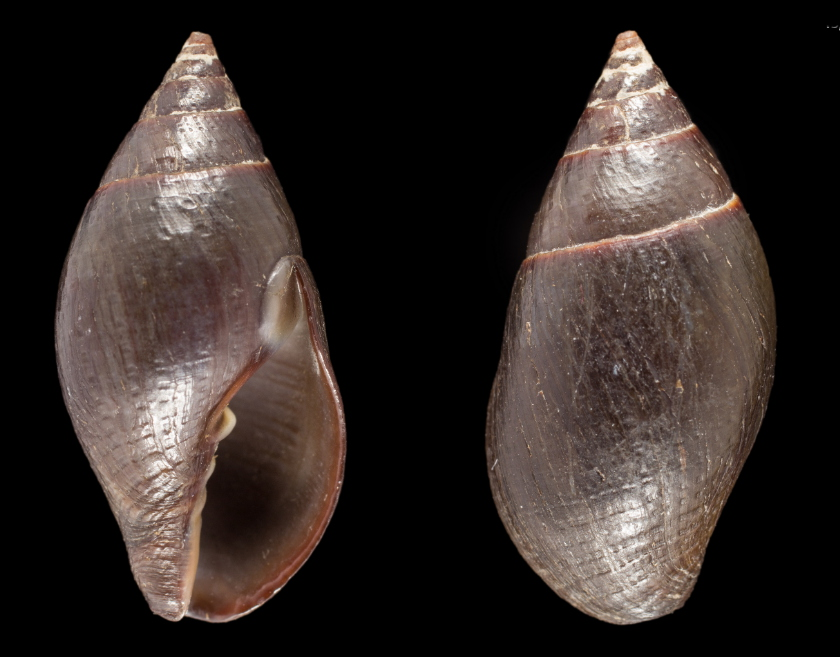
- Shell of Vexillum oleaceum (syntype at MNHN, Paris)

Scientific classification
- Kingdom: Animalia
- Phylum: Mollusca
- Class: Gastropoda
- Subclass: Caenogastropoda
- Order: Neogastropoda
- Superfamily: Turbinelloidea
- Family: Costellariidae
- Genus: Vexillum
- Species: V. oleaceum

Binomial name
- Vexillum oleaceum (Reeve, 1844)

Synonyms
- Mitra nigra Quoy & Gaimard, 1833 (invalid: secondary junior homonym...); Mitra oleacea Reeve, 1844 (original combination); Mitra quoyi Deshayes, 1844; Strigatella oleacea (Reeve, 1844); Zierliana nigra (L.A. Reeve, 1844); Zierliana oleacea (Reeve, 1844); Zierliana quoyi (L.A. Reeve, 1844)

= Vexillum oleaceum =

Species of gastropod

Vexillum oleaceum, commonly known as the olive-like mitre, is a species of small sea snail, marine gastropod mollusk in the family Costellariidae, the ribbed miters.

== Description ==
The length of the shell attains 23.8 mm.

(Original description) The shell is oblong-ovate, Buccinum-shaped, with a short spire. The whorls are convex, smooth and covered with a shining olive-brown horny epidermis.

== Distribution ==
This marine species occurs off the Philippines and Papua New Guinea.
