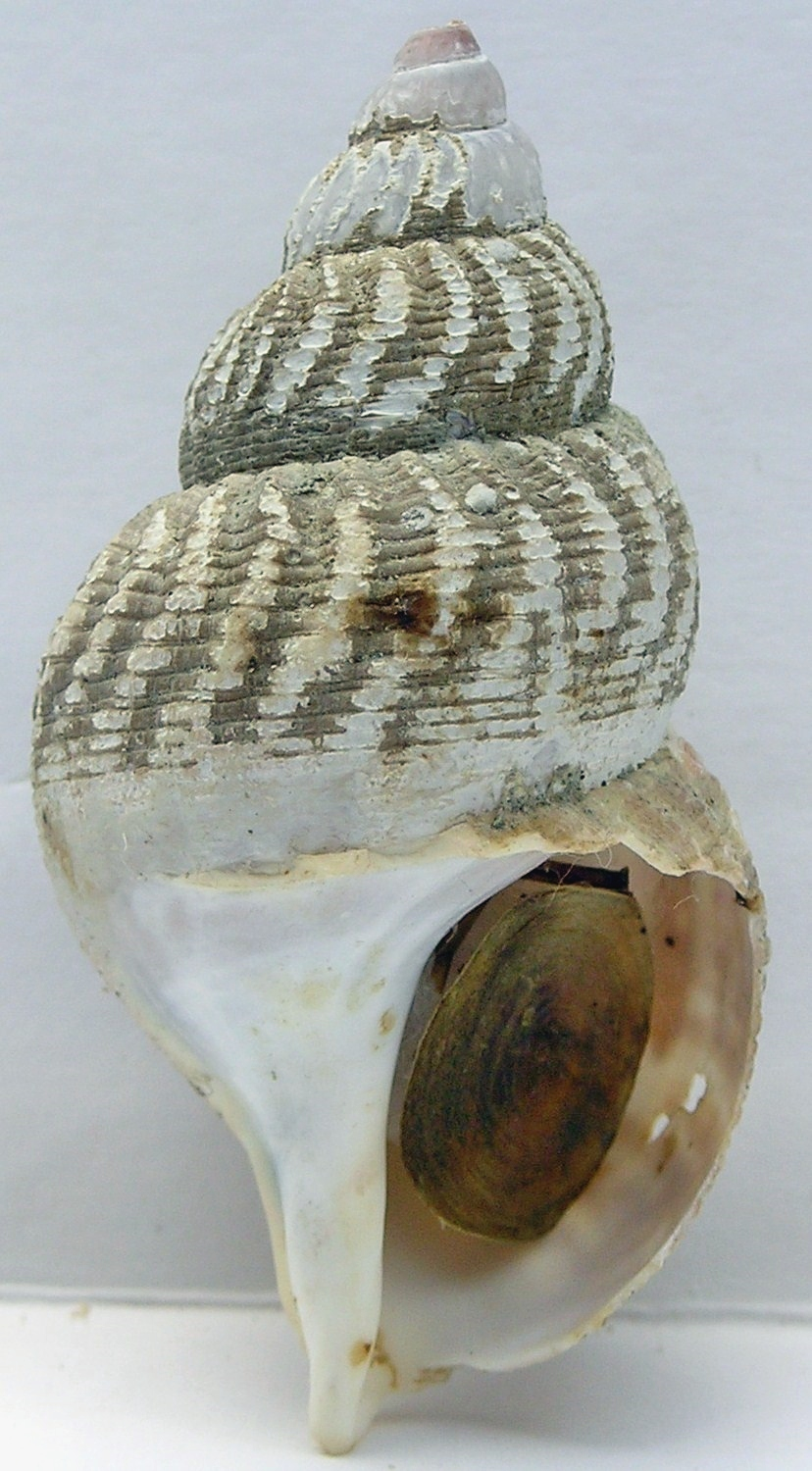

Scientific classification
- Kingdom: Animalia
- Phylum: Mollusca
- Class: Gastropoda
- Subclass: Caenogastropoda
- Order: Neogastropoda
- Family: Buccinidae
- Genus: Buccinum
- Species: B. plectrum

Binomial name
- Buccinum plectrum Stimpson, 1865

= Buccinum plectrum =

Species of gastropod

Buccinum plectrum is a species of sea snail, a marine gastropod mollusk in the family Buccinidae, the true whelks.

== Description ==
The size of an adult shell varies between 50 mm and 100 mm.

== Distribution ==
This species is distributed in the Northwest Atlantic Ocean, along Northeast Canada and along Alaska.
