= Buccinum superangulare =

Scientific classification
- Kingdom: Animalia
- Phylum: Mollusca
- Class: Gastropoda
- Subclass: Caenogastropoda
- Order: Neogastropoda
- Family: Buccinidae
- Genus: Buccinum
- Species: B. superangulare

Binomial name
- Buccinum superangulare Thorson & Oskarsson in Oskarsson, 1962

Species of gastropod

Buccinum superangulare is a species of sea snail, a marine gastropod mollusk in the family Buccinidae, the true whelks.
