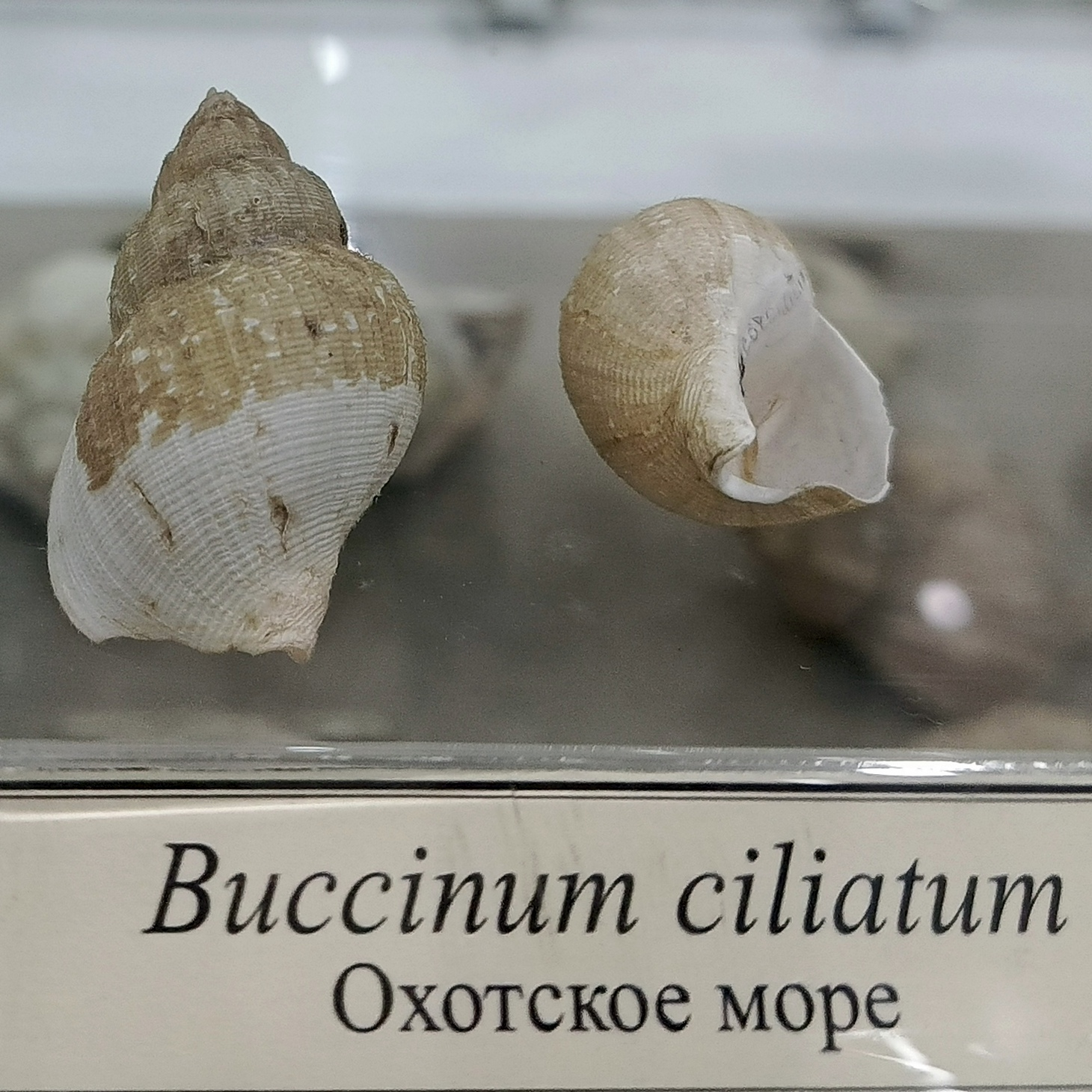

Scientific classification
- Kingdom: Animalia
- Phylum: Mollusca
- Class: Gastropoda
- Subclass: Caenogastropoda
- Order: Neogastropoda
- Family: Buccinidae
- Genus: Buccinum
- Species: B. ciliatum

Binomial name
- Buccinum ciliatum (Fabricius O., 1780)

Synonyms
- Buccinum sericatum Hancock, 1846

= Buccinum ciliatum =

Species of gastropod

Buccinum ciliatum is a species of sea snail, a marine gastropod mollusk in the family Buccinidae, the true whelks.

== Subspecies ==
- Buccinum ciliatum ciliatum Fabricius, 1780
- Buccinum ciliatum sericatum Hancock, 1846 (synonym : Buccinum sericatum Hancock, 1846)

== Description ==
The maximum shell length is 32 mm.

== Distribution ==
This species is distributed in the cold waters around the Arctic, the North West Atlantic Ocean, Greenland, Canada and the Gulf of Maine.
