= Buccinum thermophilum =

Scientific classification
- Kingdom: Animalia
- Phylum: Mollusca
- Class: Gastropoda
- Subclass: Caenogastropoda
- Order: Neogastropoda
- Family: Buccinidae
- Genus: Buccinum
- Species: B. thermophilum

Binomial name
- Buccinum thermophilum Harasewych & Kantor, 2002

Species of gastropod

Buccinum thermophilum is a species of sea snail, a marine gastropod mollusk in the family Buccinidae, the true whelks.

== Description ==
The common name for B. thermophilum is the endeavor vent whelk. Whelks are usually moderate to large in size, with smooth or sculptured whorls which often have a distinct shoulder. The aperture is large and a siphonal canal and horny operculum are present. They have two eyes at the base of tentacles, and a well-developed sense of smell. They are usually considered as predatory or scavengers. Their shell length is typically 3.5 cm. Whelks lay eggs in attached masses of lens-shaped capsules, each of which contains 200–450 eggs. Their egg size is about 275 μm, and the capsule diameter is about 5–6 mm. Buccinid whelks usually hatch from eggs as juveniles, so have limited dispersal capability. Deep-sea buccinids can survive up to a year without food.

== Distribution ==
This marine species occurs off the Juan de Fuca Ridge, Northeast Pacific
