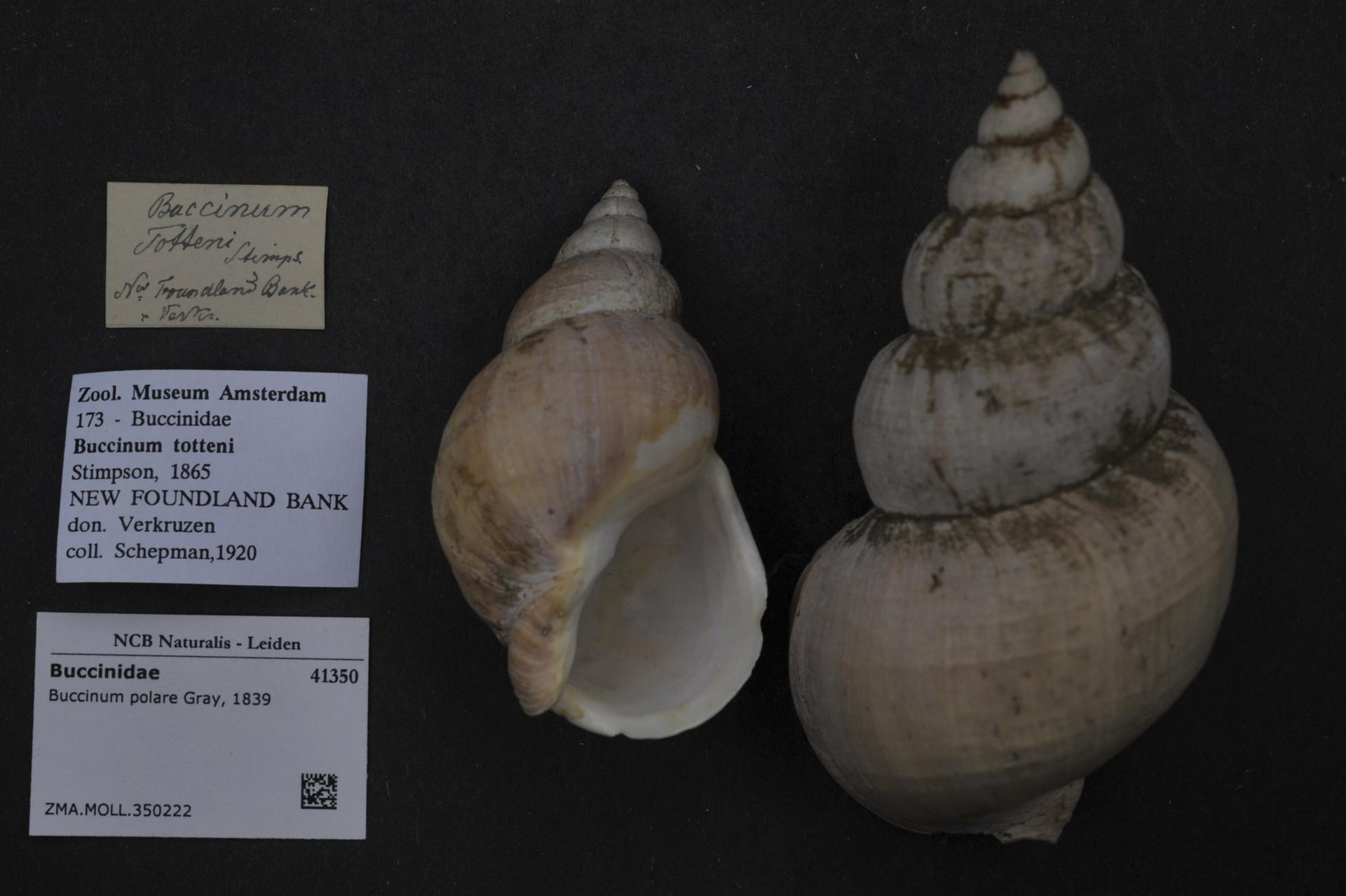
- Museum specimen

Scientific classification
- Kingdom: Animalia
- Phylum: Mollusca
- Class: Gastropoda
- Subclass: Caenogastropoda
- Order: Neogastropoda
- Family: Buccinidae
- Genus: Buccinum
- Species: B. polare

Binomial name
- Buccinum polare J. E. Gray, 1839

Synonyms
- Buccinum polaris J. E. Gray, 1839; Buccinum totteni Stimpson, 1865

= Buccinum polare =

Species of gastropod

Buccinum polare is a species of sea snail, a marine gastropod mollusk in the family Buccinidae, the true whelks.
