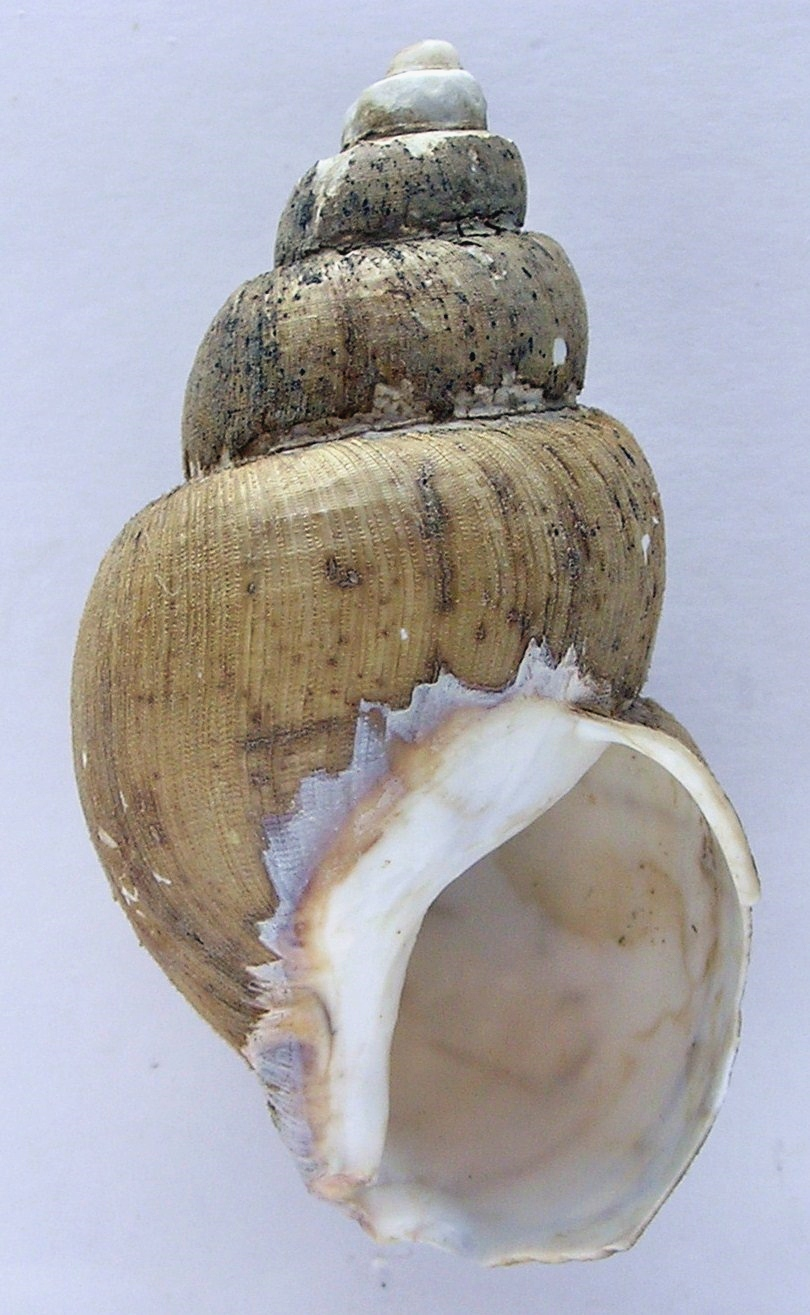
- A shell of Buccinum tsubai

Scientific classification
- Kingdom: Animalia
- Phylum: Mollusca
- Class: Gastropoda
- Subclass: Caenogastropoda
- Order: Neogastropoda
- Family: Buccinidae
- Genus: Buccinum
- Species: B. tsubai

Binomial name
- Buccinum tsubai Kuroda, T. in Teramachi, 1933

= Buccinum tsubai =

Buccinum tsubai Temporal range: Pliocene–present

Species of gastropod

Buccinum tsubai is a species of sea snail, a marine gastropod mollusk in the family Buccinidae, the true whelks.

== Description ==
The size of an adult shell varies between 50 and 80 mm (2.0 and 3.1 in). This species has a thin shell with inflated whorls and an oval to oblong, wide aperture. Across the surface run a large number of very fine, reticulated threads. The outer lip is not thick.

The tsubai whelk shows sexual dimorphism, but it is not clear whether the female is larger than the male as is the case in most Buccinum species.

== Distribution ==
This deep-sea marine species can be found in depths between 200 and 1,000 m in the Japan Sea along Japan and Korea.
