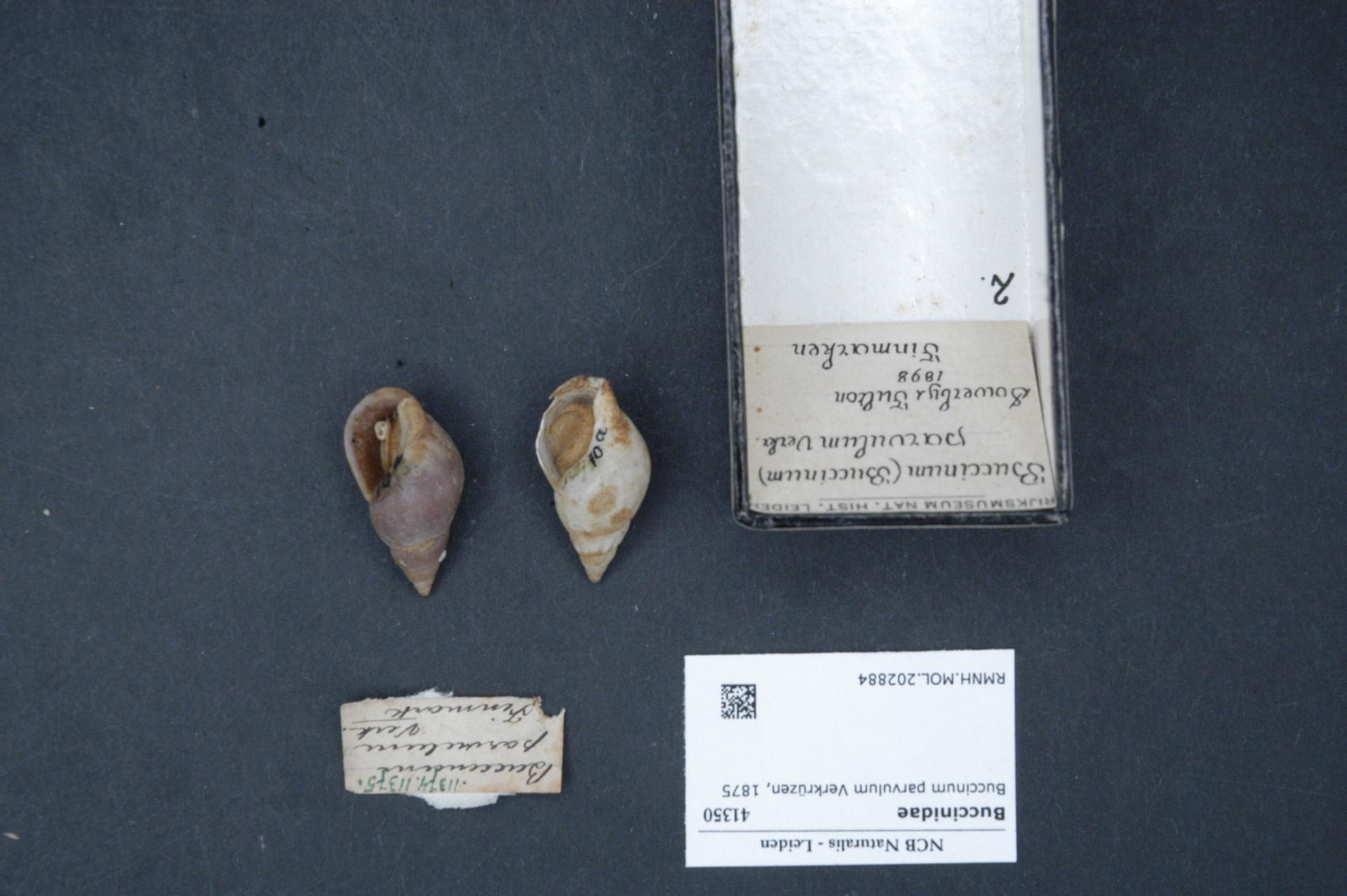

Scientific classification
- Kingdom: Animalia
- Phylum: Mollusca
- Class: Gastropoda
- Subclass: Caenogastropoda
- Order: Neogastropoda
- Family: Buccinidae
- Genus: Buccinum
- Species: B. parvulum

Binomial name
- Buccinum parvulum Verkrüzen, 1875

= Buccinum parvulum =

Species of gastropod

Buccinum parvulum is a species of sea snail, a marine gastropod mollusk in the family Buccinidae, the true whelks.
