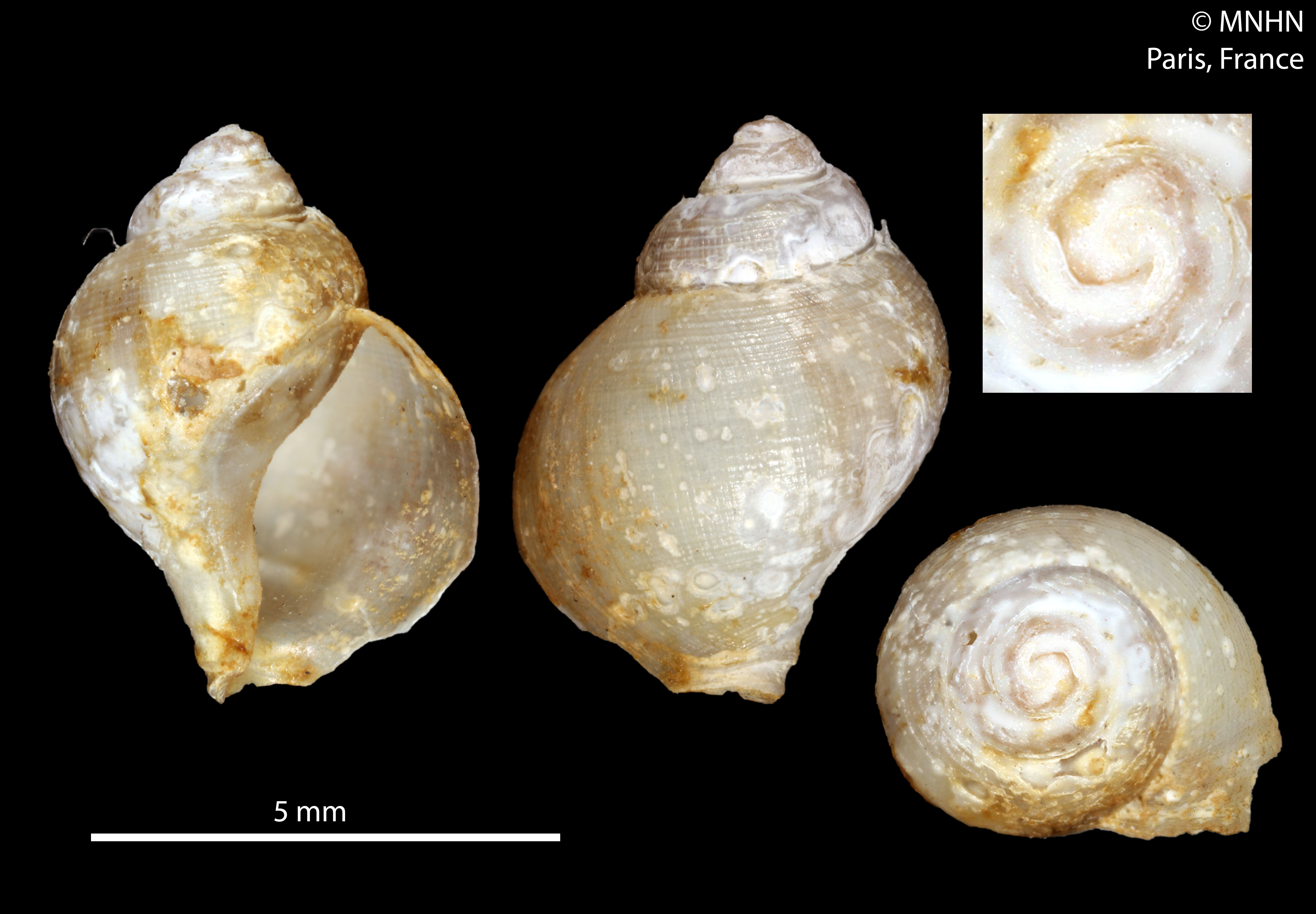
- Shell of Buccinum chinoi (paratype at MNHN, Paris)

Scientific classification
- Kingdom: Animalia
- Phylum: Mollusca
- Class: Gastropoda
- Subclass: Caenogastropoda
- Order: Neogastropoda
- Family: Buccinidae
- Genus: Buccinum
- Species: B. chinoi

Binomial name
- Buccinum chinoi Kantor, Sirenko, Zvonareva & Fedosov, 2022

Synonyms
- Ovulatibuccinum perlatum Fraussen & Chino, 2009 (junior secondary homonym of Buccinum perlatum Conrad, 1833, and B. perlatum Kuster,1858; Buccinum chinoi is a replacement name)

= Buccinum chinoi =

Species of gastropod

Buccinum chinoi is a species of sea snail, a marine gastropod mollusc in the family Buccinidae, the true whelks.

== Distribution ==
This marine species occurs off Japan.
