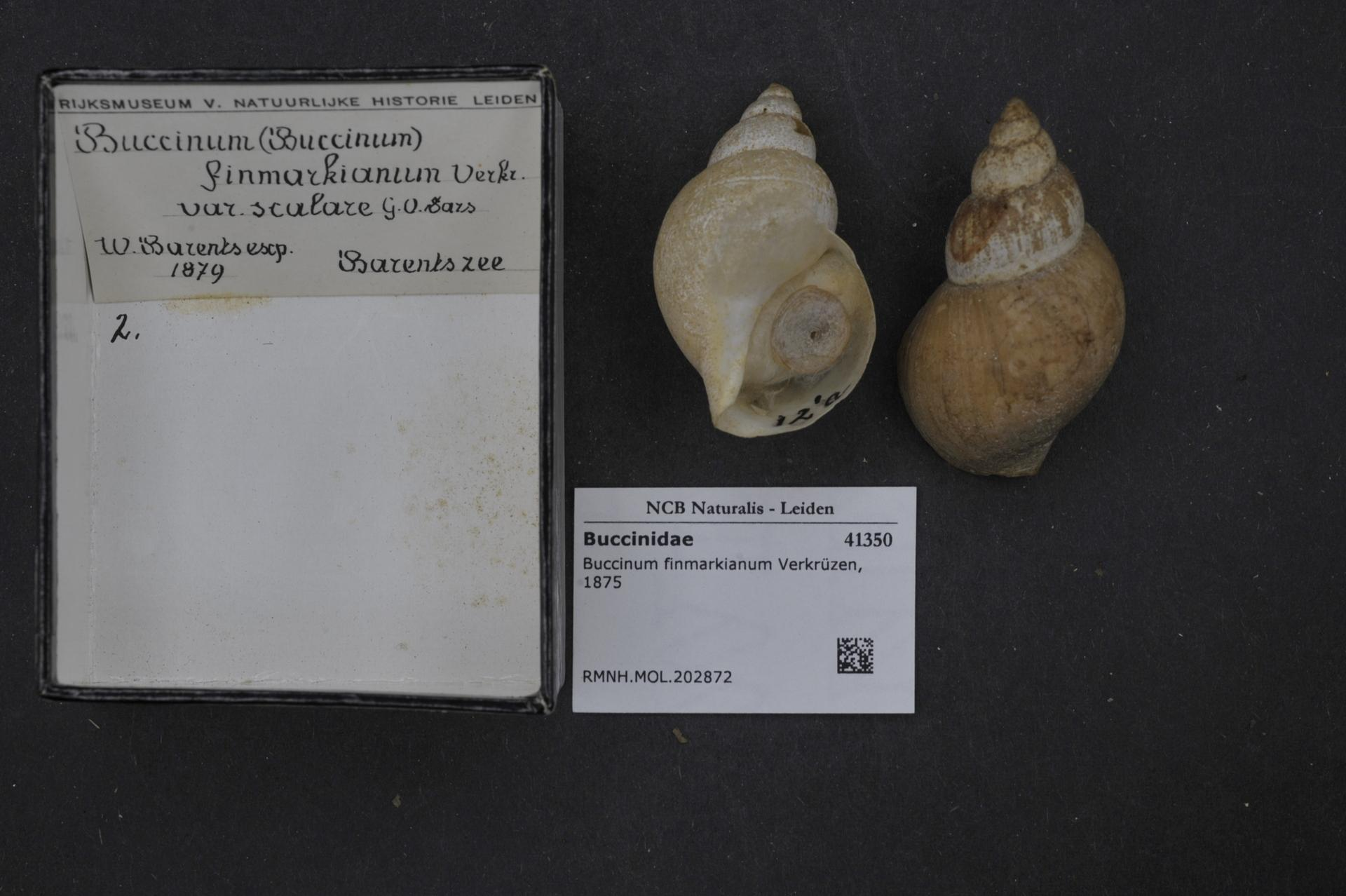

Scientific classification
- Kingdom: Animalia
- Phylum: Mollusca
- Class: Gastropoda
- Subclass: Caenogastropoda
- Order: Neogastropoda
- Family: Buccinidae
- Genus: Buccinum
- Species: B. finmarkianum

Binomial name
- Buccinum finmarkianum Verkrüzen, 1875

Synonyms
- Buccinum finmarchianum Verkrüzen, 1875; Buccinum inexhaustum Verkrüzen, 1875

= Buccinum finmarkianum =

Species of gastropod

Buccinum finmarkianum is a species of sea snail, a marine gastropod mollusk in the family Buccinidae, the true whelks.
