= Buccinum frausseni =

Scientific classification
- Kingdom: Animalia
- Phylum: Mollusca
- Class: Gastropoda
- Subclass: Caenogastropoda
- Order: Neogastropoda
- Family: Buccinidae
- Genus: Buccinum
- Species: B. frausseni

Binomial name
- Buccinum frausseni Alexeyev & Gornichnykh, 2009

Species of gastropod

Buccinum frausseni is a species of sea snail, a marine gastropod mollusk in the family Buccinidae, the true whelks.
