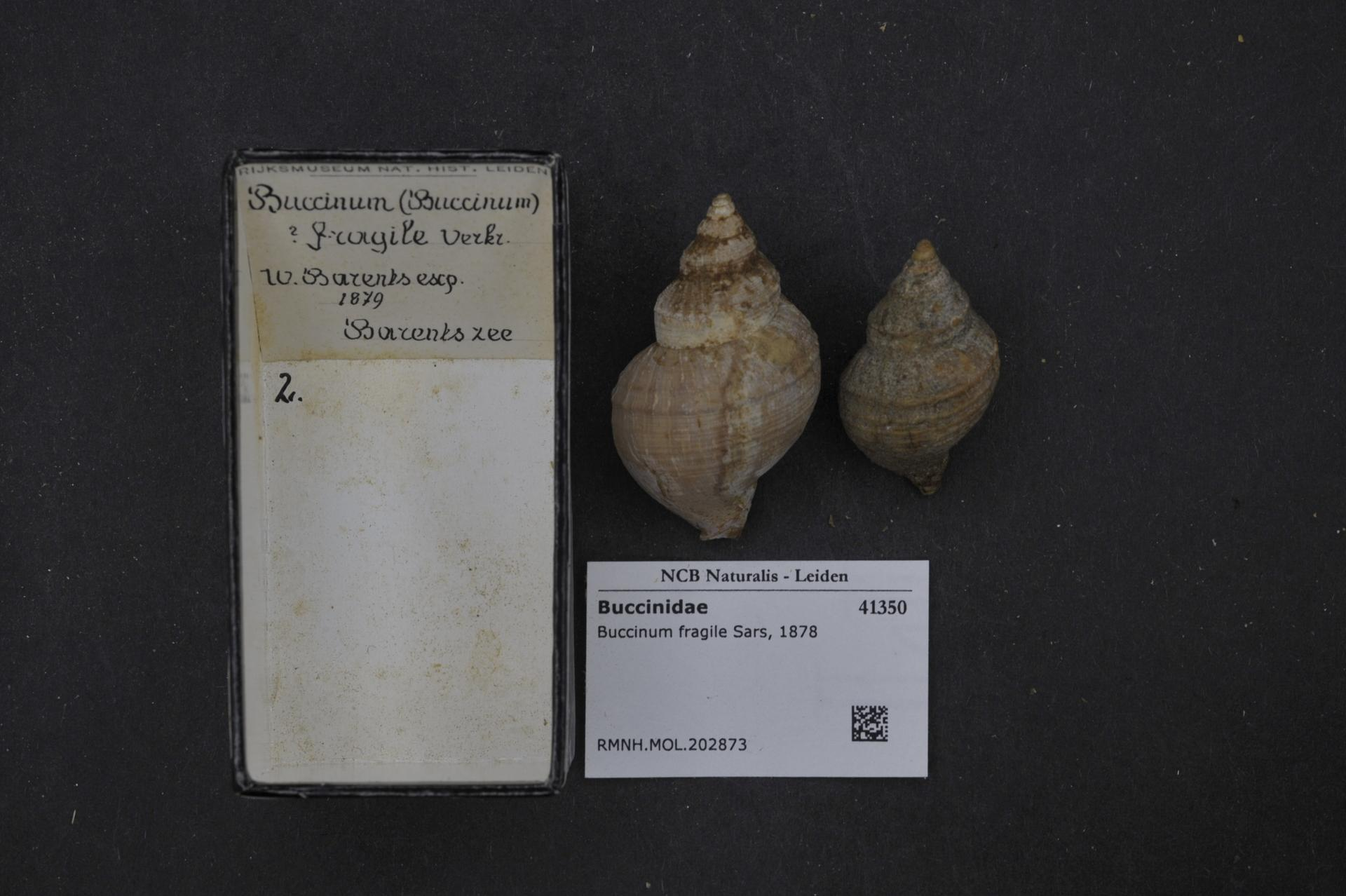

Scientific classification
- Kingdom: Animalia
- Phylum: Mollusca
- Class: Gastropoda
- Subclass: Caenogastropoda
- Order: Neogastropoda
- Family: Buccinidae
- Genus: Buccinum
- Species: B. fragile

Binomial name
- Buccinum fragile G.O. Sars, 1878

Synonyms
- Buccinum sandersoni A. E. Verrill, 1882

= Buccinum fragile =

Species of gastropod

Buccinum fragile is a species of sea snail, a marine gastropod mollusk in the family Buccinidae, the true whelks.
