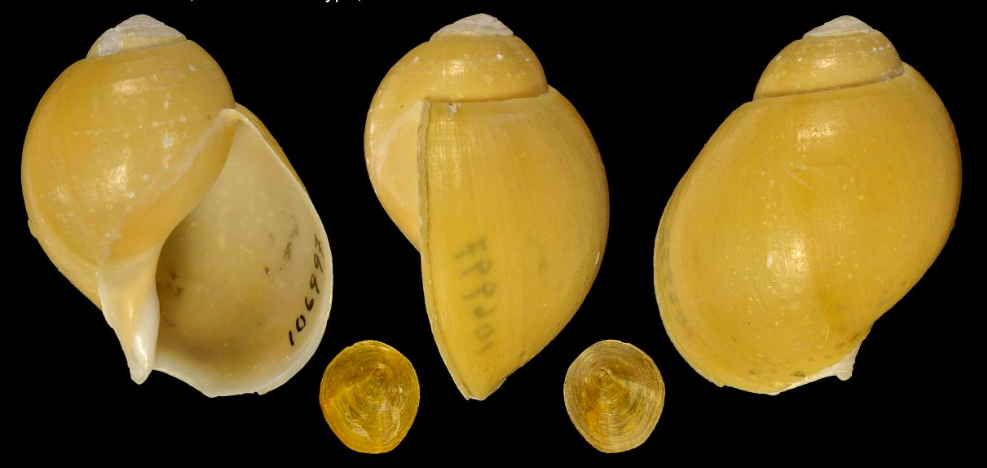
- Shell of Buccinum ovulum (holotype at the Smithsonian INstitution)

Scientific classification
- Kingdom: Animalia
- Phylum: Mollusca
- Class: Gastropoda
- Subclass: Caenogastropoda
- Order: Neogastropoda
- Family: Buccinidae
- Genus: Buccinum
- Species: B. ovulum

Binomial name
- Buccinum ovulum Dall, 1895

Synonyms
- Bathybuccinum ovulum (Dall, 1895) superseded combination; Ovulatibuccinum ovulum (Dall, 1895) ·

= Buccinum ovulum =

Species of gastropod

Buccinum ovulum is a species of sea snail, a marine gastropod mollusc in the family Buccinidae, the true whelks.

== Description ==
The length of the shell attains 25 mm, its diameter 20 mm.

(Original description) The shell is small and thin, composed of roughly 4.5 to 5 whorls. Its surface is smooth, though some specimens may exhibit faint, irregular, and often obsolete spiral threads. The shell is covered by a thin, adherent, olive-green epidermis. The shell substance itself is a livid pinkish-purple, contrasting with the white margin of the columella and aperture. The body whorl is significantly the largest. The suture is deep but not channeled.

The nucleus is eroded on all specimens, preventing detailed observation. The columella is thin and nearly straight, leading to a deep, very short, and barely recurved siphonal canal. The body whorl sometimes has a thin layer of yellowish callus.

The operculum is small and nearly circular. Its nucleus is subcentral, and the surface of attachment is fan-shaped, creating a concave depression on the outer surface.

== Distribution ==
This marine species occurs off the Aleutian Islands.
