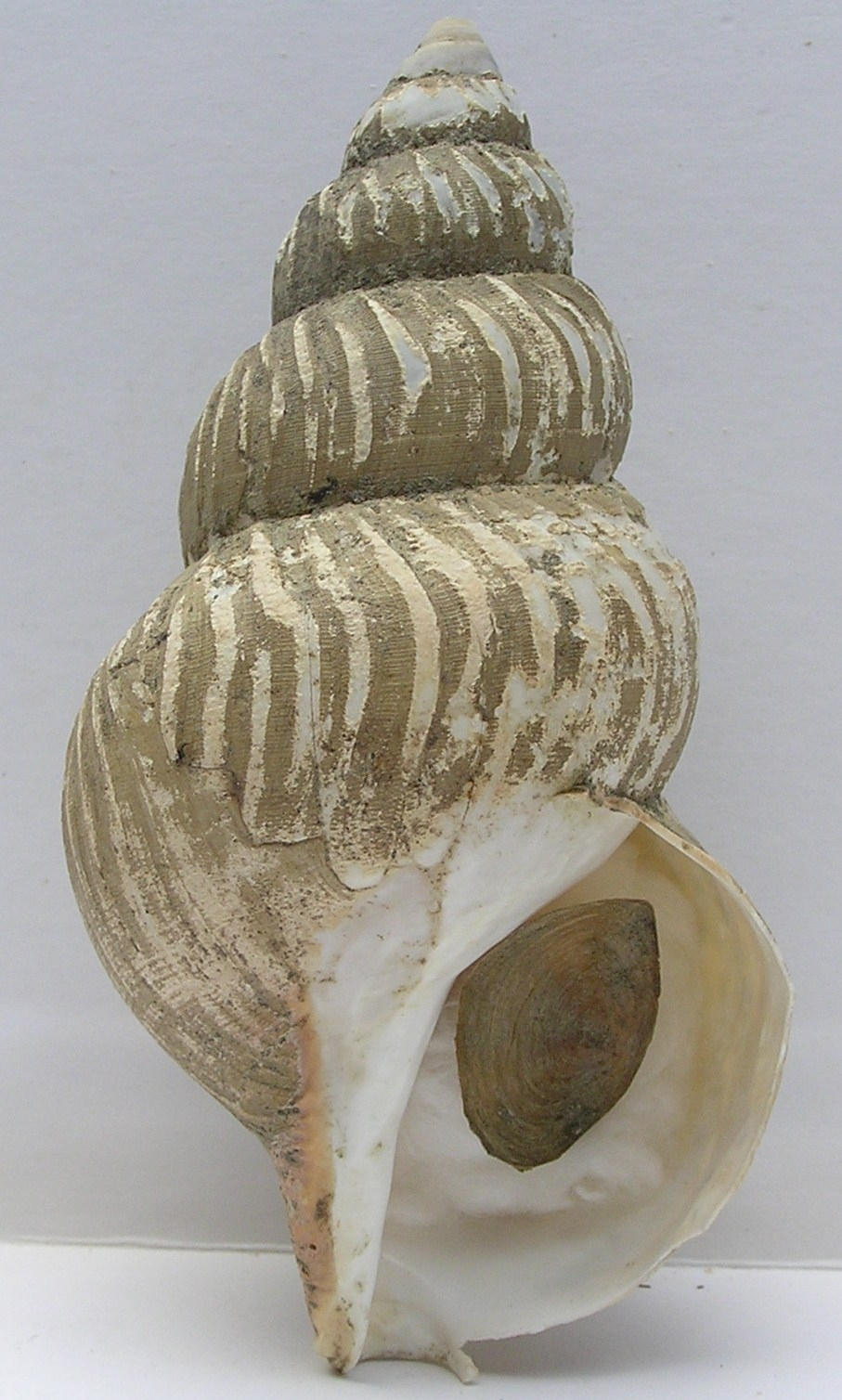
- A shell of Buccinum oedematum, the operculum in place glued onto cotton, but accidentally rotated through 180°

Scientific classification
- Kingdom: Animalia
- Phylum: Mollusca
- Class: Gastropoda
- Subclass: Caenogastropoda
- Order: Neogastropoda
- Family: Buccinidae
- Genus: Buccinum
- Species: B. oedematum

Binomial name
- Buccinum oedematum Dall, 1907

Synonyms
- Buccinum midori Habe & Ito, 1965

= Buccinum oedematum =

Species of gastropod

Buccinum oedematum, common name the swollen whelk, is a species of sea snail, a marine gastropod mollusk in the family Buccinidae, the true whelks.

== Description ==
The length of an adult shell reaches 84 mm.

== Distribution ==
This cold-water species occurs in the Gulf of Alaska. and in the Okhotsk Sea.
