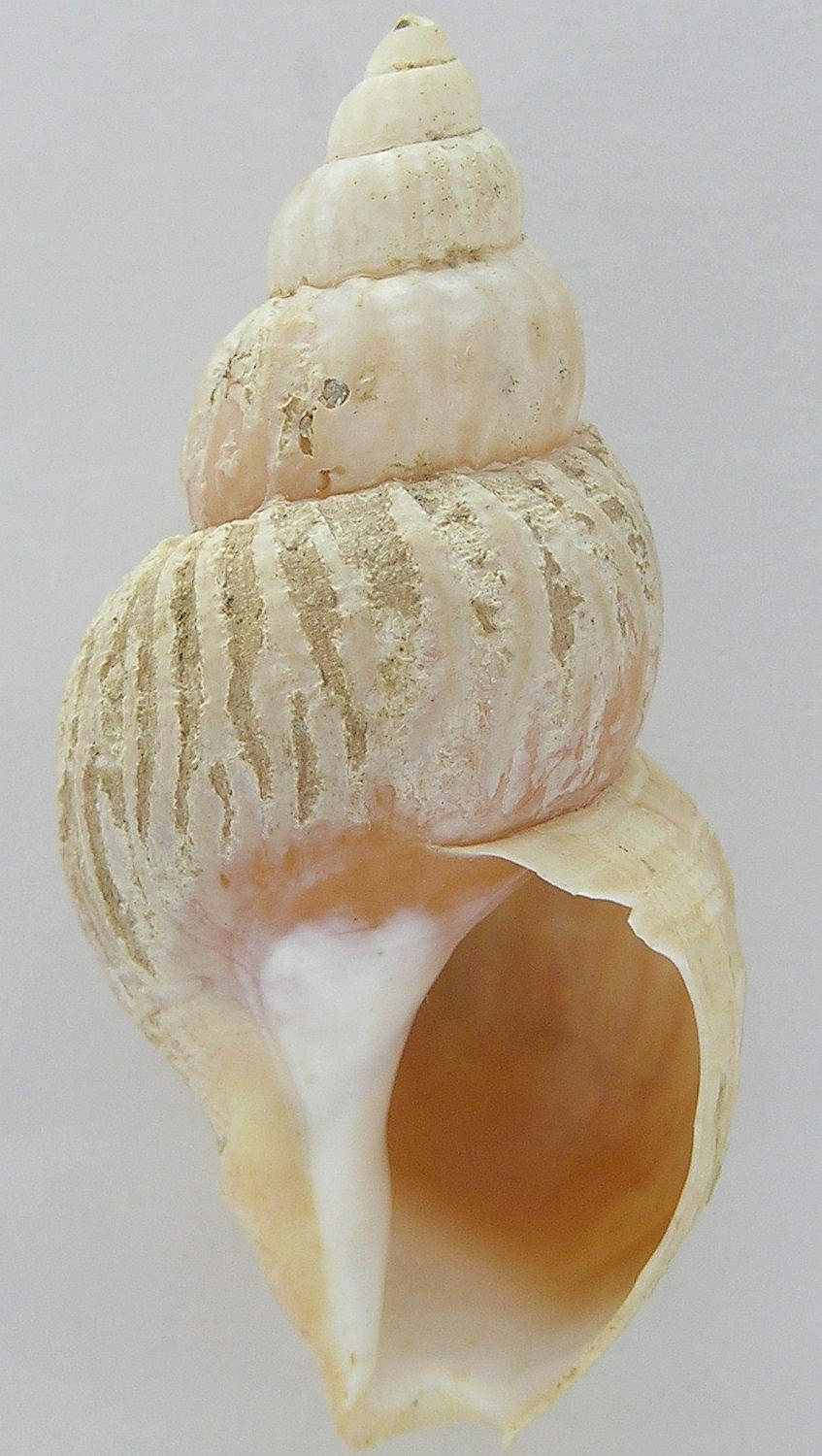
- A shell of Buccinum lyperum

Scientific classification
- Kingdom: Animalia
- Phylum: Mollusca
- Class: Gastropoda
- Subclass: Caenogastropoda
- Order: Neogastropoda
- Family: Buccinidae
- Genus: Buccinum
- Species: B. lyperum

Binomial name
- Buccinum lyperum W. H. Dall, 1919

Synonyms
- Buccinum tenue f. lyperum Dall, 1919; Buccinum tenue lyperum Dall, 1925; Buccinum elatior var. lyperum: Golikov, 1980; Buccinum rhodium Alexeyev, 2002 non Dall, 191; Buccinum rhodium var. lyperum Alexeyev, 2002

= Buccinum lyperum =

Species of gastropod

Buccinum lyperum is a species of sea snail, a marine gastropod mollusk in the family Buccinidae, the true whelks. A few authors use the epithet "lyperium"

== Description ==
The size of an adult shell varies between 51 mm and 75 mm.

== Distribution ==
This species is found in the North Pacific Ocean along the Bering Sea and Kamchatka.
