= Buccinum belcheri =

Scientific classification
- Kingdom: Animalia
- Phylum: Mollusca
- Class: Gastropoda
- Subclass: Caenogastropoda
- Order: Neogastropoda
- Family: Buccinidae
- Genus: Buccinum
- Species: B. belcheri

Binomial name
- Buccinum belcheri Reeve, 1845

Species of gastropod

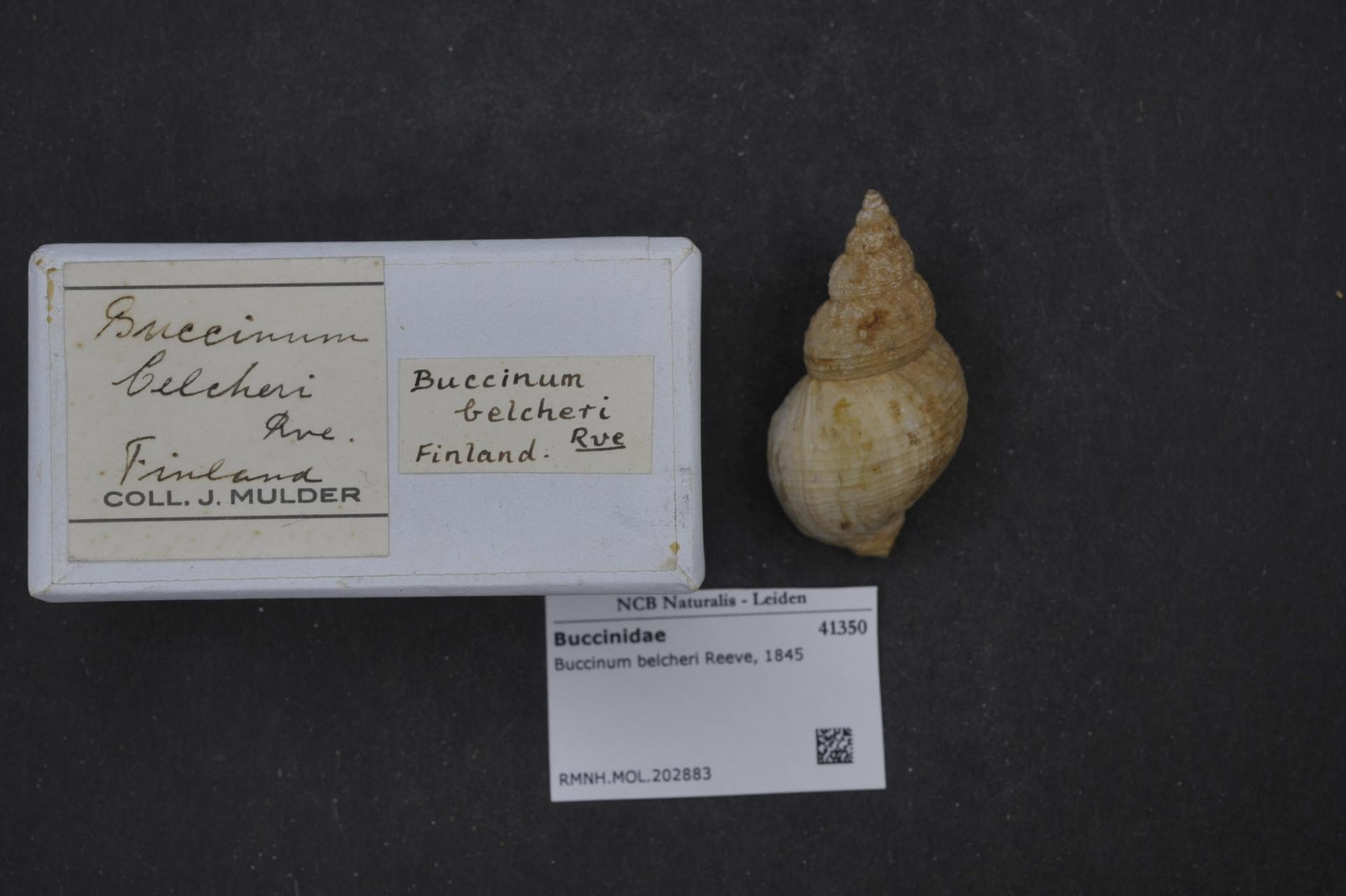

Buccinum belcheri is a species of sea snail, a marine gastropod mollusc in the family Buccinidae, the true whelks.
