= Buccinum frustulatum =

Scientific classification
- Kingdom: Animalia
- Phylum: Mollusca
- Class: Gastropoda
- Subclass: Caenogastropoda
- Order: Neogastropoda
- Family: Buccinidae
- Genus: Buccinum
- Species: B. frustulatum

Binomial name
- Buccinum frustulatum Golikov, 1980

Species of gastropod

Buccinum frustulatum is a species of sea snail, a marine gastropod mollusk in the family Buccinidae, the true whelks.
