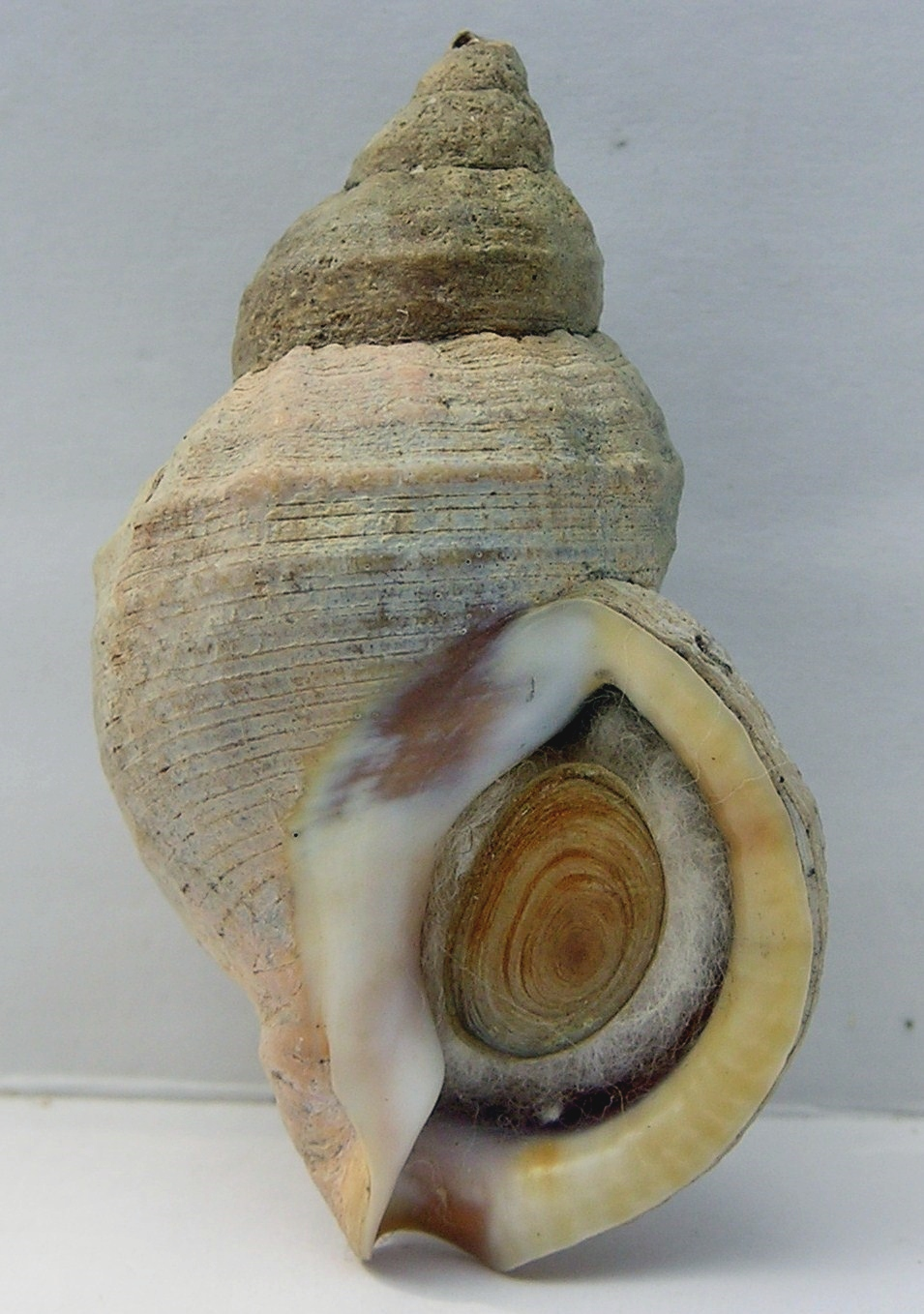
- A shell of Buccinum mirandum, the operculum held in place with cotton

Scientific classification
- Kingdom: Animalia
- Phylum: Mollusca
- Class: Gastropoda
- Subclass: Caenogastropoda
- Order: Neogastropoda
- Family: Buccinidae
- Genus: Buccinum
- Species: B. mirandum

Binomial name
- Buccinum mirandum Smith, 1875

= Buccinum mirandum =

Species of gastropod

Buccinum mirandum is a species of sea snail, a marine gastropod mollusk in the family Buccinidae, the true whelks.

There are two subspecies :

- Buccinum mirandum mirandum Smith, 1875
- Buccinum mirandum picturatum Dall, 1887

== Description ==
The shell grows to a length of 45 mm. It is white with a creamy or brownish tint and is covered with rusty brown spots. The body whorl has five, hardy perceptible spiral ribs, with the upper one somewhat nodose. The surface is puckered below the suture. The surface has a fine sculpture with minute spiral lines mingled with coarser lines. The aperture is ovate and oblong and its interior is brownish ochraceous. The outer lip is white.

== Distribution ==
This marine species is distributed in the Pacific Ocean along Japan, Korea and the Kuril Islands
