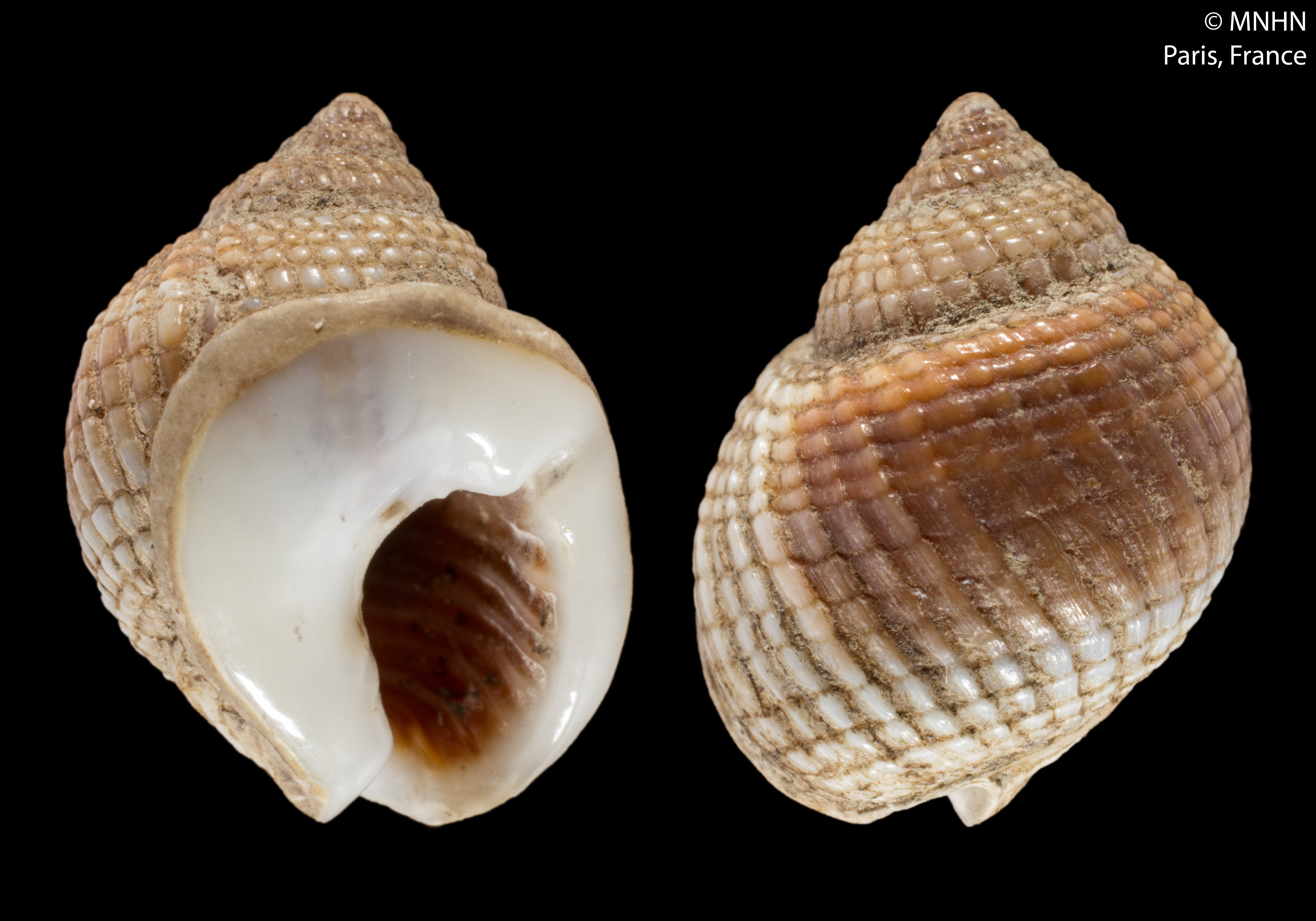
- Two views of a shell of Nassarius globosus (lectotype at MNHN, Paris)

Scientific classification
- Kingdom: Animalia
- Phylum: Mollusca
- Class: Gastropoda
- Subclass: Caenogastropoda
- Order: Neogastropoda
- Family: Nassariidae
- Genus: Nassarius
- Species: N. globosus

Binomial name
- Nassarius globosus (Quoy & Gaimard, 1833)

Synonyms
- list of synonyms: Arcularia globosa (Quoy & Gaimard, 1833); Buccinum clathratum Kiener, 1834 (unnecessary substitute name for Buccinum globosum Quoy & Gaimard, 1833; invalid: junior homonym of Buccinum clathratum Born, 1778); Buccinum globosum Quoy & Gaimard, 1833; Nassa (Arcularia) globosa (Quoy & Gaimard, 1833); Nassa globosa (Quoy & Gaimard, 1833); Nassarius (Arcularia) globosa (Quoy & Gaimard, 1833); Nassarius (Plicarcularia) globosus (Quoy & Gaimard, 1833); Nassarius (Plicarcularia) gibbosuloidea Habe, T. & S. Kosuge, 1966; Nassarius gibbosuloideus (Habe & Kosuge, 1966); Niotha globosa (Quoy & Gaimard, 1833); Plicarcularia gibbosuloidea Habe & Kosuge, 1966; Plicarcularia globosa (Quoy & Gaimard, 1833)

= Nassarius globosus =

Species of gastropod

Nassarius globosus, common name the globose nassa, is a species of sea snail, a marine gastropod mollusc in the family Nassariidae, the Nassa mud snails or dog whelks.

== Description ==
The length of the shell varies between 9 mm and 28 mm.

The small shell is ovate, thick and slightly gibbous. The spire is short and pointed. It is composed of six slightly convex whorls, covered with longitudinal folds and very approximate transverse striae, which form flattened granulations. The body whorl is very large. The ovate aperture is emarginated at the upper part, at its union with the outer lip, which is rather thin, and striated internally. The columella is arcuated, covered by the inner lip, which is enlarged into a whitish, wide, and thick callosity, upon the body of the lbody whorl. The color of this shell is of a reddish brown, with one or two transverse bands upon the middle of the body whorl.

== Distribution ==
This species occurs in the Eastern Indian Ocean off Tanzania; off Sri Lanka, Thailand, China, Indonesia and off many islands in the Western Pacific; off Papua New Guinea, the Solomon Islands, New Caledonia, New Hebrides and Australia (Queensland).
