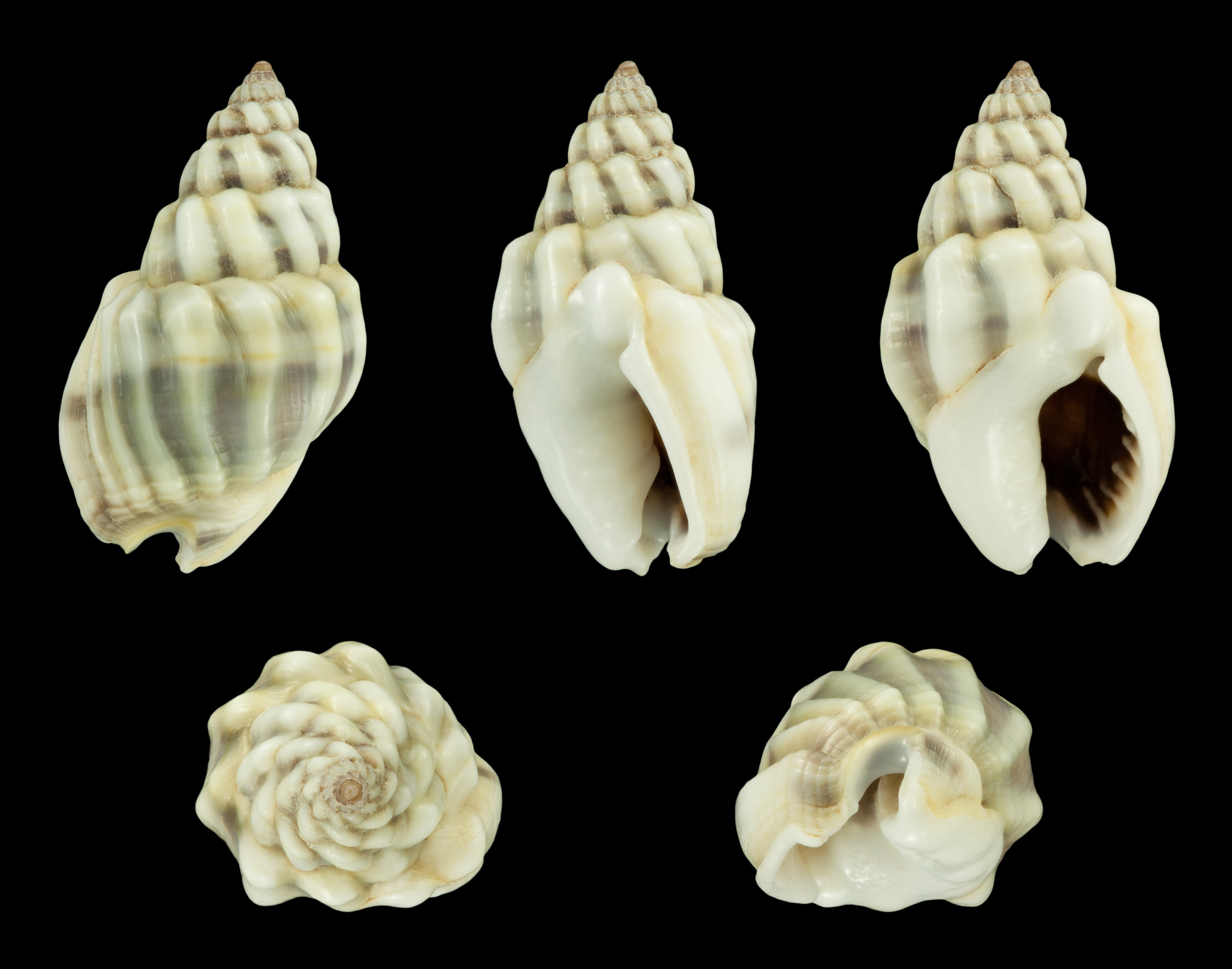

Scientific classification
- Kingdom: Animalia
- Phylum: Mollusca
- Class: Gastropoda
- Subclass: Caenogastropoda
- Order: Neogastropoda
- Family: Nassariidae
- Genus: Nassarius
- Species: N. coronulus

Binomial name
- Nassarius coronulus (A. Adams, 1852)

Synonyms
- Buccinum afrum Philippi, 1851; Nassa (Phrontis) coronula A. Adams, 1852; Nassa afra (Philippi, 1851); Nassa coronula A. Adams, 1851; Nassarius (Niotha) coronulus (A. Adams, 1852)

= Nassarius coronulus =

Species of gastropod

Nassarius coronulus, commonly known as the small crown dog whelk, is a species of sea snail, a marine gastropod mollusc in the family Nassariidae, the Nassa mud snails or dog whelks.

== Description ==
The shell grows to a length of 15 mm.

== Distribution ==
This species occurs in the Red Sea and in the Indian Ocean offshore of Madagascar and the Mascarene Basin.
