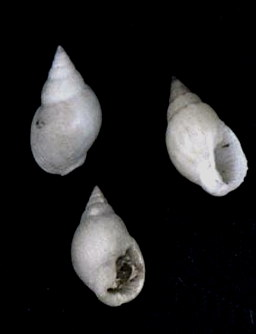
- Three shells of Nassarius crassiusculus (museum specimens at Naturalis Biodiversity Center)

Scientific classification
- Kingdom: Animalia
- Phylum: Mollusca
- Class: Gastropoda
- Subclass: Caenogastropoda
- Order: Neogastropoda
- Family: Nassariidae
- Genus: Nassarius
- Species: N. crassiusculus

Binomial name
- Nassarius crassiusculus (Nyst, 1845)

Synonyms
- Buccinum crassiusculum Nyst, 1845 (original combination); Buccinum elegans Kiener, 1834 (invalid: junior homonym of Buccinum elegans O. G. Costa, 1822 and B. elegans J. de C. Sowerby, 1824; B. crassiusculum is a replacement name ); Nassarius elegans (Kiener, 1834)

= Nassarius crassiusculus =

Species of gastropod

Nassarius crassiusculus, is a species of sea snail, a marine gastropod mollusc in the family Nassariidae, the Nassa mud snails or dog whelks.

== Taxonomy ==
Buccinum / Nassarius elegans was regarded by Cernohorsky (1984) as a synonym of Nassarius comptus. It is listed in WoRMS as a valid species on the authority of H. Kool. However, as the name Buccinum elegans Kiener, 1834, is nomenclaturally invalid, it is listed under its replacement name, Buccinum / Nassarius crassiusculus.

== Description ==
The thick shell is ovate, conical, shining and smooth. Its ground color is whitish, ornamented with numerous undulated and reddish longitudinal lines. The spire composed of eight or nine convex whorls. The upper ones are plaited, and the others marked at their upper part with white and brown spots or blotches, alternately disposed, and surrounding the suture. A band a little deeper colored covers the body of the body whorl, the base of which is furnished with pretty distinct transverse striae or furrows, five or six in number. The white aperture is ovate, terminated above by a sort of canal, indicated by a transverse ridge upon the left lip. The outer lip is thick, slightly denticulated towards the base, and deeply striated within. The columella is arcuated, the base spirally folded. The left lip covers it, extends slightly upon the body of the shell, and forms a small, projecting keel, terminated by small drops, and a raised point.

== Distribution ==
This species occurs in the Indian Ocean off the Seychelles
