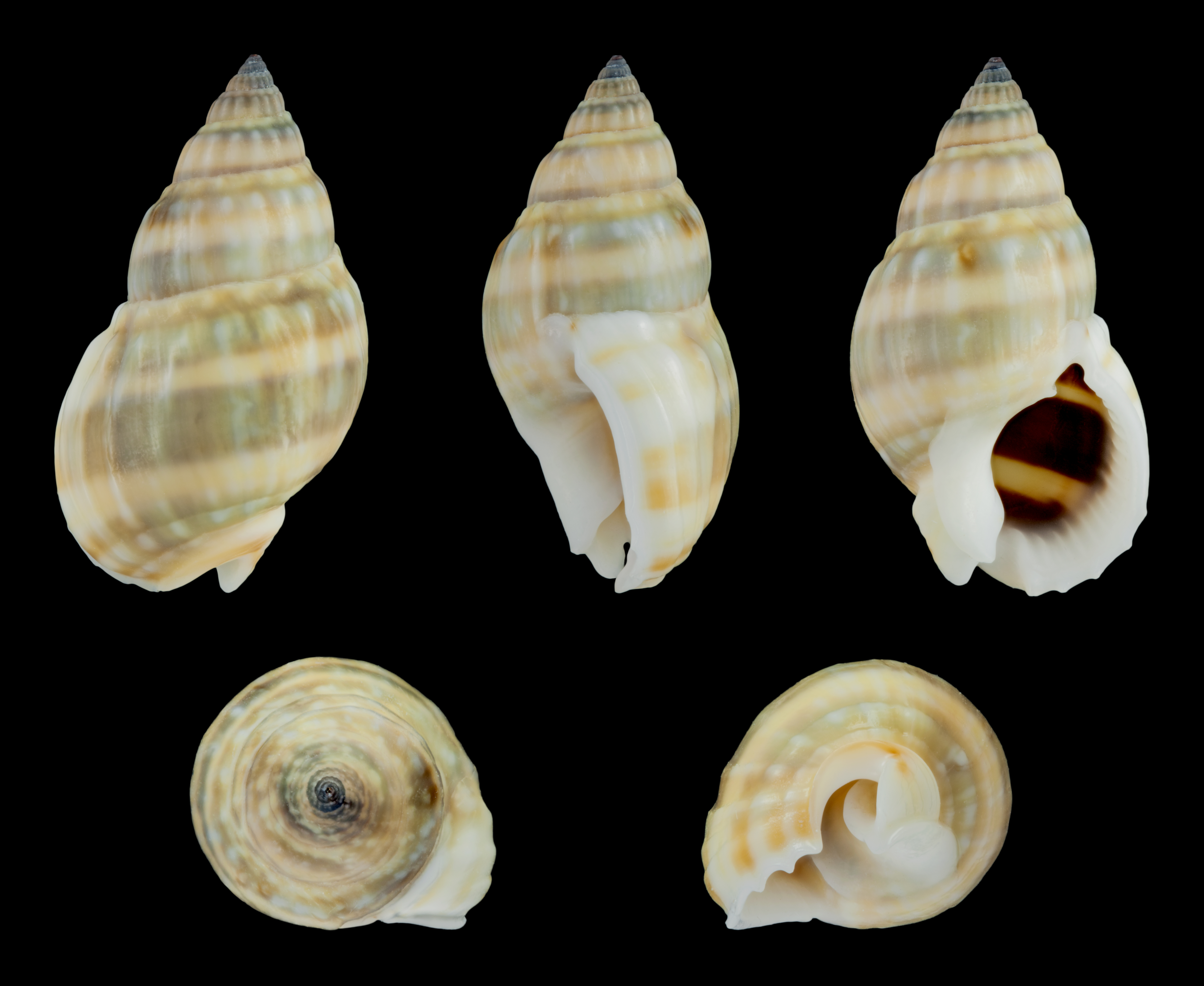
- A shell of Nassarius distortus

Scientific classification
- Kingdom: Animalia
- Phylum: Mollusca
- Class: Gastropoda
- Subclass: Caenogastropoda
- Order: Neogastropoda
- Family: Nassariidae
- Genus: Nassarius
- Species: N. distortus

Binomial name
- Nassarius distortus (A. Adams, 1852)

Synonyms
- Buccinum coronatum Quoy & Gaimard, 1833; Buccinum monile Kiener, 1834; Nassa (Alectrion) monilis (Kiener, 1853); Nassa (Alectryon) monilis (Kiener, 1853); Nassa distorta A. Adams, 1852; Nassa lachrymosa Reeve, 1853; Nassa monile (Kiener, 1834); Nassarius (Niotha) distortus (A. Adams, 1852); Nassarius monile (Kiener, 1853)

= Nassarius distortus =

Species of gastropod

Nassarius distortus, common name : the distorted nassa, is a species of sea snail, a marine gastropod mollusc in the family Nassariidae, the Nassa mud snails or dog whelks.

== Description ==
The shell size varies between 18 mm and 35 mm

The ovate, conical shell is smooth, polished, and whitish. A decurrent band of a rose color is seen beneath the suture, and three others surround the middle of the lowest whorl. That of the middle is broader and more apparent. The spire is composed of seven slightly convex whorls, ornamented with longitudinal ribs formed like folds, numerous and slightly elevated. The upper edge of the whorls is a little flattened. The base of the lowest is accompanied with two distinct ridges. The suture is edged with rounded tubercles situated between each fold, where they form a sort of necklace. The white aperture is ovate, contracted above by a transverse fold of the callosity. The outer lip is subtruncated, somewhat denticulated upon the lower edge, and marked with transverse striae internally. The columella edge is covered by a pretty thick callosity, spreading a little upon the belly of the shell.

== Distribution ==
This marine species has a wide distribution in the Indo-West Pacific; also occurs off Australia (Queensland)
