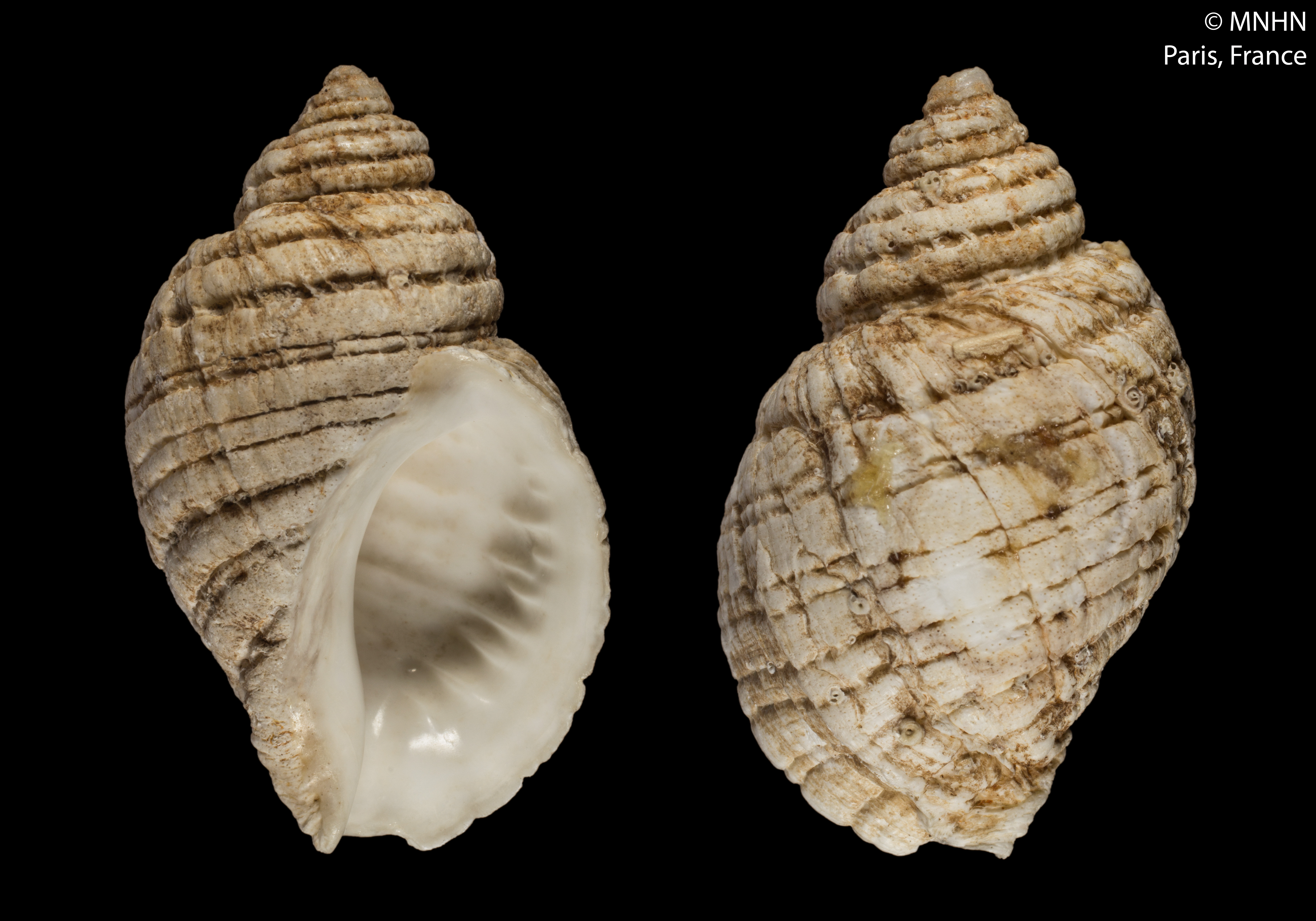
- Shell of Haustrum lacunosum (paralectotype at MNHN, Paris)

Scientific classification
- Kingdom: Animalia
- Phylum: Mollusca
- Class: Gastropoda
- Subclass: Caenogastropoda
- Order: Neogastropoda
- Family: Muricidae
- Genus: Haustrum
- Species: H. lacunosum

Binomial name
- Haustrum lacunosum (Bruguière, 1789)

Synonyms
- Buccinum bicostatum Bruguière, 1789; Buccinum lacunosa Bruguière, 1789; Lepsithais lacunosa (Bruguière, 1789); Lepsithais youngi Finlay, 1928; Polytropa squamata Hutton, 1878; Purpura rupestris Valenciennes, 1846; Purpura striatum sensu Martyn Deshayes, 1844

= Haustrum lacunosum =

Species of gastropod

Haustrum lacunosum is a species of sea snail, a marine gastropod mollusk in the family Muricidae, the murex or rock snails.

== Description ==
The length of the shell varies between 20 mm and 53 mm.

== Distribution ==
This marine species occurs off New Zealand.
