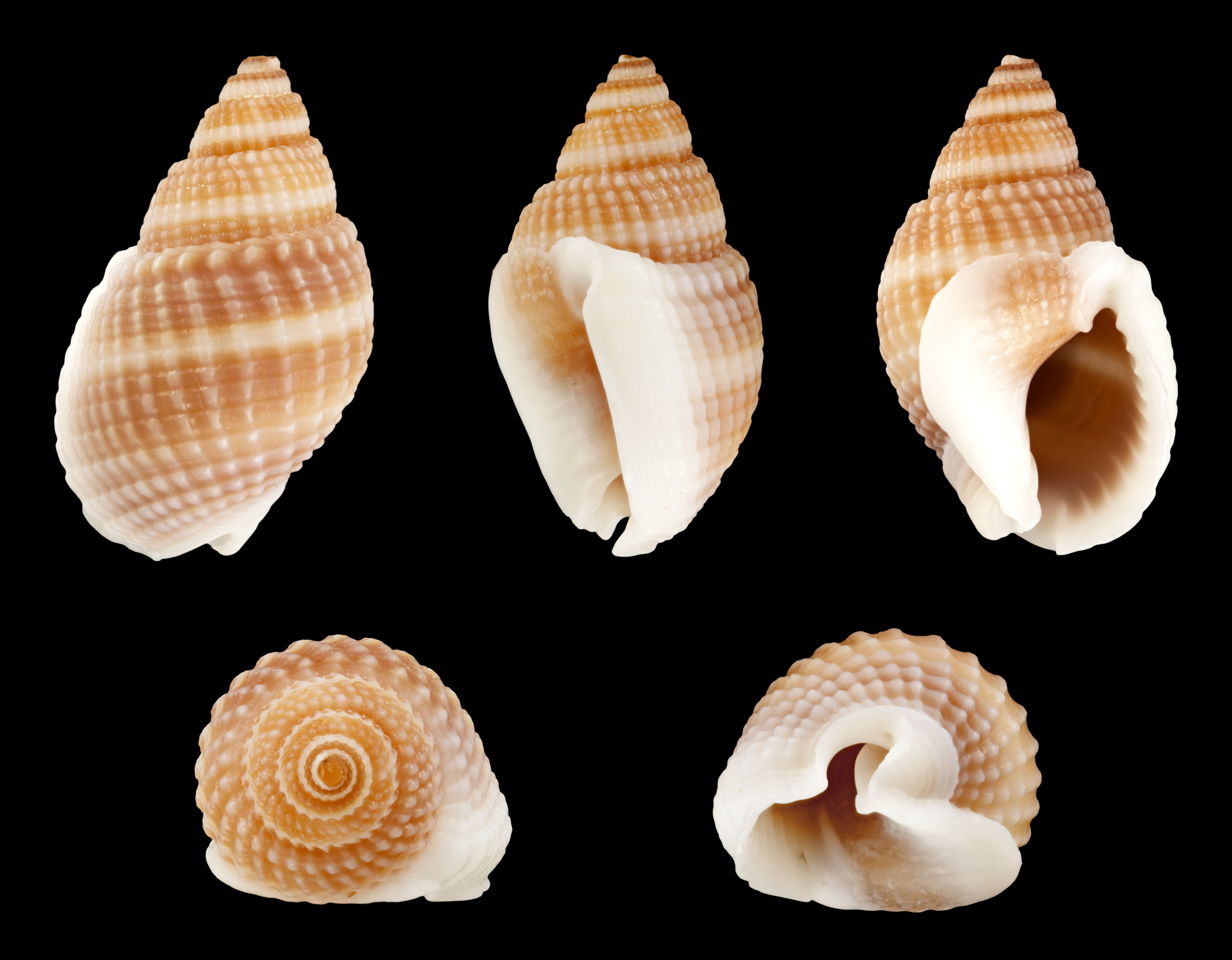

Scientific classification
- Kingdom: Animalia
- Phylum: Mollusca
- Class: Gastropoda
- Subclass: Caenogastropoda
- Order: Neogastropoda
- Family: Nassariidae
- Genus: Nassarius
- Species: N. livescens

Binomial name
- Nassarius livescens (Philippi, 1848)

Synonyms
- Buccinum livescens Philippi, 1848; Nassa (Niotha) kieneri Deshayes, 1863; Nassa (Niotha) livescens (Philippi, 1849); Nassa deshayesii Rousseau, 1854; Nassa gracilis Pease, 1871; Nassa keenii Marrat, 1877; Nassa livescens (Philippi, 1848); Nassa lyraeformis Marrat, 1880; Nassa margaritifera Reeve, 1853; Nassa marginulata Reeve, 1853; Nassa oblonga Marrat, 1877; Nassa provulgata Fischer, 1891; Nassa secluza Fisher, 1891; Nassa sordida A. Adams, 1852; † Nassarius (Niotha) fulleri MacNeil, 1960; Nassarius (Niotha) kieneri (Deshayes, 1863); Nassarius (Niotha) livescens (Philippi, 1849); Nassarius (Niotha) secluzus (Fischer, 1891); Nassarius (Plicarcularia) sordidus (A. Adams, 1852); Nassarius kieneri (Deshayes, 1863); Niotha livescens (Philippi, 1849)

= Nassarius livescens =

Species of gastropod

Nassarius livescens is a species of sea snail, a marine gastropod mollusk in the family Nassariidae, the Nassa mud snails or dog whelks.

== Description ==
The length of the shell varies between 16 mm and 30 mm.

== Distribution ==
This species occurs in the Indian Ocean off Madagascar and the Mascarene Basin; in the Pacific Ocean off Japan and Indonesia.
