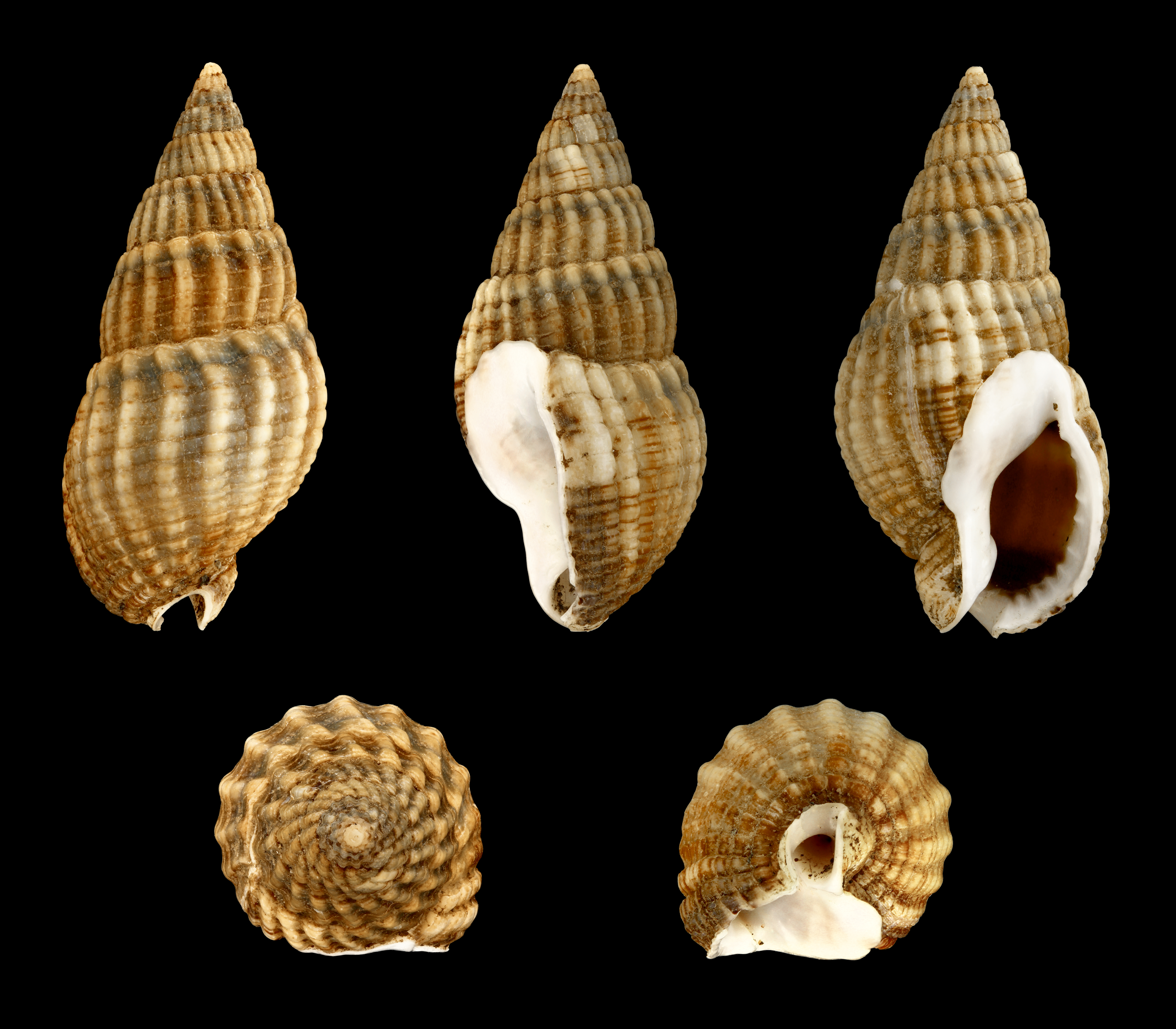
- Tritia reticulata shell

Scientific classification
- Kingdom: Animalia
- Phylum: Mollusca
- Class: Gastropoda
- Subclass: Caenogastropoda
- Order: Neogastropoda
- Family: Nassariidae
- Subfamily: Nassariinae
- Genus: Tritia; Risso, 1826

Type species
- Buccinum reticulatum Linnaeus, 1758

Synonyms
- See list of synonyms

= Tritia =

Genus of gastropods

Tritia is a genus of sea snails, marine gastropod mollusks in the family Nassariidae, the Nassa mud snails or dog whelks.

== Description ==
(Described as Neritula) The shell is ovate, depressed, with the axis distorted. The spire is flattened and oblique. The whorls are smooth. The aperture is depressed. The columella is smooth. The inner lip is callous and is spread over the body whorl. The outer lip is reflected, not denticulate or striated.

The body whorl is depressed and extends over the penultimate whorl, nearly covering and concealing the spire, which, consequently, appears very obtuse.

== Species ==
Species within the genus Tritia include:

- † Tritia albrechti Stein, 2019
- † Tritia andersoni (F. Nordsieck, 1972)
- † Tritia andonae (Bellardi, 1882)
- † Tritia aquitanica (Mayer, 1858)
- † Tritia aturensis (Peyrot, 1925)
- † Tritia auingeri (R. Hoernes & Auinger, 1882)
- † Tritia bagolyensis Z. Kovács & Vicián, 2023
- † Tritia banatica (O. Boettger, 1902)
- † Tritia basteroti (Michelotti, 1847)
- † Tritia blesensis (Mayer, 1862)
- † Tritia bocholtensis (Beyrich, 1854)
- † Tritia brugnonis (Bellardi, 1882)
- Tritia burchardi (Philippi, 1849)
- Tritia caboverdensis (Rolán, 1984)
- † Tritia cancellarioides (F. Nordsieck, 1972)
- Tritia catullorum T. Cossignani, 2021
- † Tritia cestasensis '(Peyrot, 1925)
- † Tritia cimbrica (Ravn, 1907)
- † Tritia clathrata (Born, 1778)
- † Tritia colpophora (Cossmann, 1903)
- Tritia conspersa (Philippi, 1849)
- † Tritia contusa (Zhizhchenko, 1934)
- Tritia coralligena (Pallary, 1900)
- Tritia corniculum (Olivi, 1792)
- Tritia corrugata (Brocchi, 1814)
- † Tritia cotteri (Landau, C. M. Silva & Gili, 2009)
- † Tritia crassispiralis (van Voorthuysen, 1944)
- † Tritia degrangei (Peyrot, 1925)
- † Tritia denselineata (Nagao, 1928)
- Tritia denticulata (A. Adams, 1852)
- † Tritia dinizae (Landau, C. M. Silva & Gili, 2009)
- Tritia djerbaensis Aissaoui, Galindo, Puillandre & Bouchet, 2017
- † Tritia domonkosi Z. Kovács & Vicián, 2023
- † Tritia edentata Báldi, 1966
- † Tritia edlaueri (Beer-Bistricky, 1958)
- Tritia elata (Gould, 1845)
- Tritia elongata (Bucquoy, Dautzenberg & Dollfus, 1882)
- Tritia ephamilla (Watson, 1882)
- † Tritia facki (Koenen, 1872)
- † Tritia franzenaui (Csepreghy-Meznerics, 1956)
- Tritia frigens (Martens, 1878)
- † Tritia gallica (Peyrot, 1925)
- Tritia gelingsehensis (Beets, 1986)
- † Tritia gerdsteini Z. Kovács & Vicián, 2023
- † Tritia gestroi (Hornung, 1920)
- Tritia gibbosula (Linnaeus, 1758)
- † Tritia girondica (Peyrot, 1925)
- Tritia goreensis (Maltzan, 1884)
- Tritia grana (Lamarck, 1822)
- † Tritia hemmoorica Stein, 2019
- Tritia heynemanni (Maltzan, 1884)
- † Tritia ickei (K. Martin, 1914)
- † Tritia incommodans (Peyrot, 1925)
- Tritia incrassata (Strøm, 1768)
- † Tritia jyllandica Stein, 2019
- † Tritia kalimantanensis (Beets, 1983)
- † Tritia karikalensis (Cossmann, 1903)
- † Tritia karinwienrichae Stein, 2019
- † Tritia karoroensis (Maxwell, 1988)
- †Tritia karreri (R. Hoernes & Auinger, 1882)
- † Tritia kostejana (O. Boettger, 1902)
- Tritia lanceolata (Bucquoy, Dautzenberg & Dollfus, 1882)
- † Tritia latestriata (Kautsky, 1925)
- † Tritia letkesensis Z. Kovács & Vicián, 2023
- † Tritia levensauensis (Hinsch, 1987)
- Tritia lima (Dillwyn, 1817)
- † Tritia longitesta (Beer-Bistrický, 1958)
- Tritia louisi (Pallary, 1912)
- † Tritia lusitanica (Landau, C. M. Silva & Gili, 2009)
- † Tritia mancietensis (Peyrot, 1925)
- Tritia miga (Bruguière, 1789)
- † Tritia miniridibunda Lozouet, 2021
- † Tritia mondegoensis (Landau, C. M. Silva & Gili, 2009)
- † Tritia mostafavii Stein, 2019
- Tritia mothsi Stein, 2019
- Tritia mutabilis (Linnaeus, 1758)
- † Tritia nanggulanensis (K. Martin, 1914)
- Tritia neritea (Linnaeus, 1758)
- Tritia nitida (Jeffreys, 1867)
- † Tritia oblonga (Sasso, 1827)
- † Tritia occidentalis (Peyrot, 1925)
- Tritia ovoidea (Locard, 1886)
- Tritia pallaryana Aissaoui, Galindo, Puillandre & Bouchet, 2017
- Tritia pellucida (Risso, 1826)
- † Tritia pelouatensis (Peyrot, 1925)
- Tritia pfeifferi (Philippi, 1844)
- † Tritia plioholsatica (Landau, C. M. Silva & Gili, 2009)
- † Tritia pliomagna (Sacco, 1890)
- † Tritia praebasteroti Lozouet, 2021
- † Tritia producta (Bellardi, 1882)
- † Tritia pygmaea (Schlotheim, 1820)
- † Tritia pyrenaica (Fontannes, 1879)
- Tritia recidiva (von Martens, 1876)
- †Tritia recta (Dollfus & Dautzenberg, 1886)
- † Tritia rejecta (O. Boettger, 1906)
- Tritia reticulata (Linnaeus, 1758)
- † Tritia ridibunda (Lozouet, 1999)
- † Tritia ronaldjansseni (Schnetler, 2005)
- † Tritia rozieri (Peyrot, 1925)
- † Tritia saucatsensis (Peyrot, 1925)
- † Tritia schlotheimi (Beyrich, 1854)
- † Tritia schoenni (R. Hoernes & Auinger, 1882)
- † Tritia schroederi (Kautsky, 1925)
- † Tritia scrobiculata (Zhizhchenko, 1936)
- † Tritia semistriata (Brocchi, 1814)
- Tritia senegalensis (Maltzan, 1884)
- † Tritia separabilis (Laws, 1939)
- † Tritia serraticosta (Bronn, 1831)
- † Tritia signatodentis (Harzhauser & Cernohorsky, 2011)
- † Tritia slieswicia (Rasmussen, 1966)
- † Tritia socialis (Hutton, 1886)
- † Tritia sorgenfreii Stein, 2019
- † Tritia sororcula (Peyrot, 1925)
- † Tritia spectabilis (Nyst, 1845)
- † Tritia spiraliscabra (Chapman & Gabriel, 1914)
- † Tritia stephanensis (Peyrot, 1925)
- † Tritia subasperata (O. Boettger, 1906)
- † Tritia subincognita (Lozouet, 1999)
- † Tritia substraminea (Grateloup, 1834)
- † Tritia subtessellata (Peyrot, 1925)
- † Tritia syltensis (Beyrich, 1854)
- † Tritia tatei (Tenison Woods, 1879)
- Tritia tavernai T. Cossignani, 2018
- Tritia tenuicosta (Bucquoy, Dautzenberg & Dollfus, 1882)
- † Tritia tenuistriata (Beyrich, 1854)
- Tritia tinei (Maravigna, 1840) (taxon inquirendum)
- Tritia tingitana (Pallary, 1901)
- † Tritia turonensis (Deshayes, 1844)
- † Tritia turtaudierei Landau, Ceulemans & Van Dingenen, 2019
- Tritia turulosa (Risso, 1826)
- † Tritia twistringensis (A. W. Janssen, 1972)
- Tritia unifasciata (Kiener, 1834)
- † Tritia urupica (Sarytsheva, 1993)
- Tritia varicosa (W. Turton, 1825)
- Tritia vincenzoi T. Cossignani, 2021
- † Tritia voorthuyseni (Janse & A. W. Janssen, 1983)
- † Tritia westfalica Stein, 2019
- † Tritia wienrichi (Gürs, 2002)

Species brought into synonymy

- Tritia alba (Say, 1826): synonym of Phrontis alba (Say, 1826)
- Tritia casta (Gould, 1850): synonym of Nassarius castus (Gould, 1850)
- Tritia erythraea (Issel, 1869): synonym of Reticunassa erythraea (Issel, 1869)
- Tritia (Hinia) festivus (Powys, 1835): synonym of Nassarius festivus (Powys, 1835): synonym of Reticunassa festiva (Powys, 1835)
- Tritia (Reticunassa) dermestina (Gould, 1860): synonym of Nassarius pauperus (Gould, 1850): synonym of Nassarius pauper (Gould, 1850): synonym of Reticunassa paupera (Gould, 1850)
- Tritia (Reticunassa) hiradoensis (Pilsbry, 1904): synonym of Nassarius fraterculus (Dunker, 1860)
- Tritia (Tritonella) crenulicostata Shuto, 1969: synonym of Nassarius crenulicostatus (Shuto, 1969): synonym of Reticunassa crenulicostata (Shuto, 1969)
- Tritia (Varicinassa) variciferus (A. Adams, 1852): synonym of Nassarius variciferus (A. Adams, 1852)
- Tritia cuvierii (Payraudeau, 1826): synonym of Tritia corrugata (Brocchi, 1814) ( junior subjective synonym)
- Tritia festiva (Powys, 1835): synonym of Nassarius festivus (Powys, 1835): synonym of Reticunassa festiva (Powys, 1835)
- Tritia fratercula (Dunker, 1860): synonym of Nassarius fraterculus (Dunker, 1860)
- † Tritia infralaevis (Fischer in Wanner, 1927): synonym of † Nassarius infralaevis (P. J. Fischer, 1921) (superseded combination)
- Tritia obsoleta (Say, 1822): synonym of Ilyanassa obsoleta (Say, 1822)
- Tritia pygmaea (Lamarck, 1822): synonym of Tritia varicosa (W. Turton, 1825)
- Tritia reticulata: synonym of Nassarius reticulatus (Linnaeus, 1758)
- Tritia sinusigera (A. Adams, 1852): synonym of Nassarius sinusigerus (A. Adams, 1852)
- Tritia siquijorensis (A. Adams, 1852): synonym of Nassarius siquijorensis (A. Adams, 1852)
- Tritia swearingeni (Petuch & R. F. Myers, 2014): synonym of Nassarius swearingeni Petuch & R. F. Myers, 2014
- Tritia trivittata (Say, 1822): synonym of Ilyanassa trivittata (Say, 1822)
- Tritia vaucheri (Pallary, 1906): synonym of Naytia vaucheri (Pallary, 1906) (superseded combination)
- Tritia vitiensis (Hombron & Jacquinot, 1848): synonym of Nassarius vitiensis (Hombron & Jacquinot, 1848)
- Tritia websteri (Petuch & Sargent, 2012): synonym of Nassarius websteri Petuch & Sargent, 2012
- Tritia westerlundi (Brusina, 1900): synonym of Tritia neritea (Linnaeus, 1758)
- † Tritia wilsoni (Ludbrook, 1978): synonym of † Nassarius wilsoni (Ludbrook, 1978)

== List of synonyms of the genus ==
List of synonyms of Tritia
- Alectrion (Hima) Leach in Gray, 1852
- Alectrion (Tritia) A. Adams, 1853
- Amycla H. Adams & A. Adams, 1853
- Amyclina Iredale, 1918 (unnecessary replacement name for Amycla H. & A. Adams, 1853 )
- Cencus Gistel, 1848
- Cyclonassa Swainson, 1840 (Objective synonym of Cyclope)
- Cyclope Risso, 1826
- Cyclops Montfort, 1810 (Invalid: junior homonym of Cyclops O.F. Müller, 1785 [Crustacea]; Cencus Gistel, 1848 is a replacement name)
- † Fackia Nordsieck, 1972
- Hima Leach in Gray, 1852
- † Hima (Mirua) Marwick, 1931
- Hinia Leach, 1847
- Hinia (Reticunassa) Iredale, 1936
- Hinia (Telasco) H. Adams & A. Adams, 1853
- Hinia (Tritonella) A. Adams, 1852
- Ilyanassa Stimpson, 1865
- † Mirua Marwick, 1931
- Nana Schumacher, 1817 (Invalid: Placed on the Official Index by ICZN Opinion 793)
- Nanina Risso, 1826
- Nassa (Amycla) H. Adams & A. Adams, 1853
- Nassa (Gussonea) Monterosato, 1912
- Nassa (Hima) Leach in Gray, 1852
- Nassa (Hinia) Gray, 1847
- Nassa (Telasco) H. Adams & A. Adams, 1853
- Nassa (Tritia) A. Adams, 1853
- Nassa (Tritonella) A. Adams, 1852
- Nassa (Uzita) H. Adams & A. Adams, 1853
- Nassarius (Amyclina) Iredale, 1918
- Nassarius (Cryptonassarius) Cernohorsky, 1975
- Nassarius (Cyclope) Risso, 1826
- Nassarius (Cyclops) Montfort, 1810
- Nassarius (Gussonea) Monterosato, 1912
- Nassarius (Hima) Leach in Gray, 1852
- Nassarius (Hinia) Leach, 1847
- Nassarius (Ilyanassa) Stimpson, 1865
- † Nassarius (Miohinia) Nordsieck, 1972
- Nassarius (Mirua) Marwick, 1931
- Nassarius (Naytiopsis) Thiele, 1929
- Nassarius (Neritula) H. Adams & A. Adams, 1853
- † Nassarius (Paranassa) Conrad, 1867
- Nassarius (Parcanassa) Iredale, 1936
- Nassarius (Reticunassa) Iredale, 1936
- Nassarius (Telasco) H. Adams & A. Adams, 1853
- Nassarius (Tritia) A. Adams, 1853
- Nassarius (Tritonella) A. Adams, 1852
- Nassarius (Usita) (incorrect subsequent spelling)
- Nassarius (Uzita) H. Adams & A. Adams, 1853
- Naytiopsis Thiele, 1929
- Neritula H. Adams & A. Adams, 1853 (Objective synonym of Cyclope)
- Panormella O. G. Costa, 1840
- Parcanassa Iredale, 1936
- Proneritula Thiele, 1929
- Tarazeuxis Iredale, 1936
- Telasco H. & A. Adams, 1853
- Tritia (Hinia)
- Tritia (Reticunassa) Iredale, 1936
- Tritia (Tritonella) A. Adams, 1852
- Tritonella A. Adams, 1852
- Uzita H. Adams & A. Adams, 1853
- Zeuxis (Tarazeuxis) Iredale, 1936
