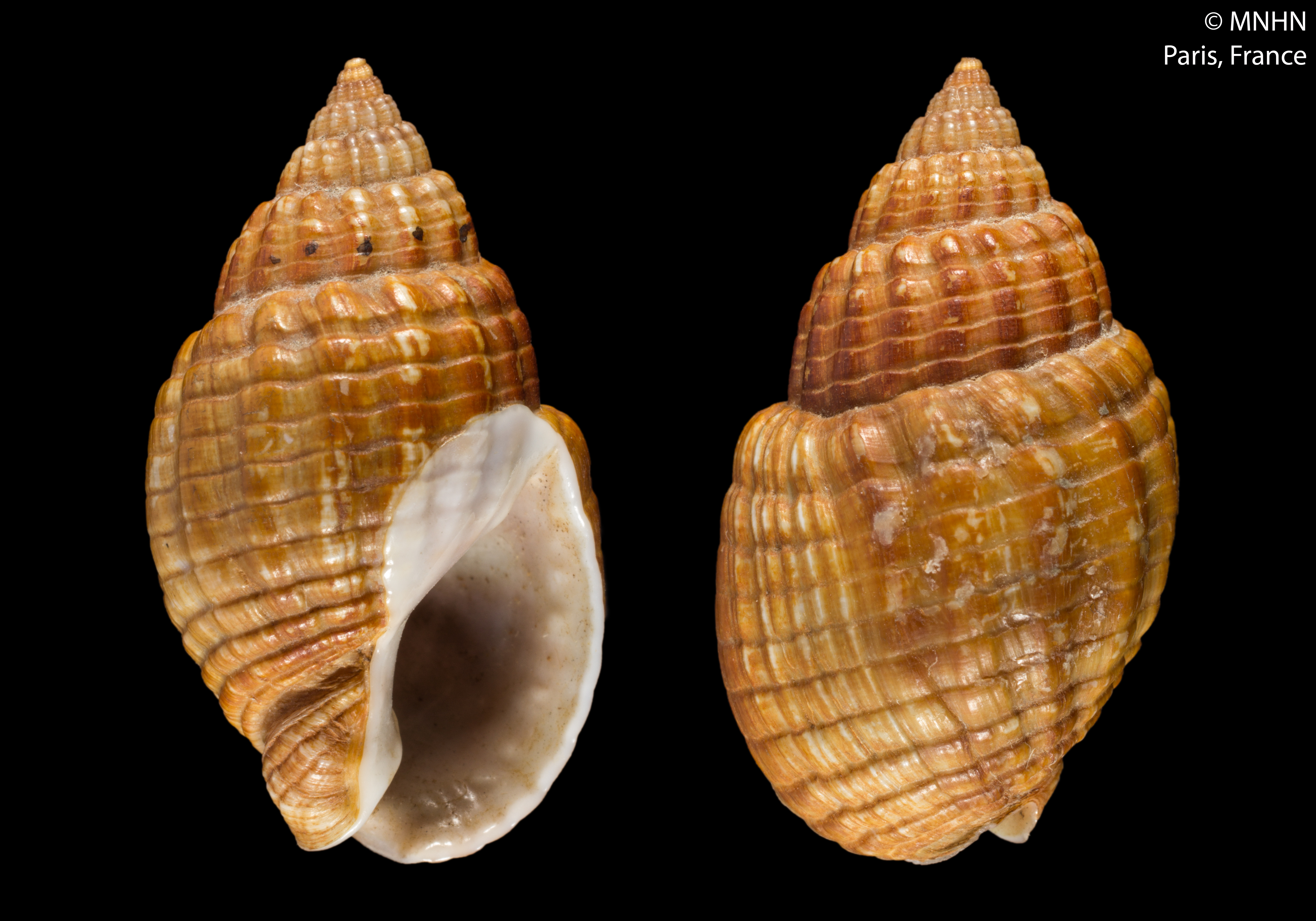
- Shell of Tritia nitida (syntype at MNHN, Paris)

Scientific classification
- Kingdom: Animalia
- Phylum: Mollusca
- Class: Gastropoda
- Subclass: Caenogastropoda
- Order: Neogastropoda
- Family: Nassariidae
- Genus: Tritia
- Species: T. nitida

Binomial name
- Tritia nitida (Jeffreys, 1867)

Synonyms
- Buccinum nassulum Salis Marschlins, 1793 (dubious synonym); Hinia nitida (Jeffreys, 1867); Nassa (Hinia) mammillata [sic]; Nassa (Hinia) mammillata var. abnormis Coen, 1933; Nassa (Hinia) mammillata var. acutior Coen, 1933; Nassa (Hinia) mammillata var. clodiensis Coen, 1933; Nassa (Hinia) mammillata var. monilifera Coen, 1933; Nassa (Hinia) reticulata var. pliocrassa Sacco, 1904; † Nassa abnormis Coen, 1933 · unaccepted (synonym); Nassa aegyptiaca Fischer P. in Vassel 1880; Nassa abnormis Coen 1914; Nassa acutior Coen 1933; Nassa bicolorata Coen 1933; Nassa clodiensis Coen 1933; Nassa deformis Coen 1933; Nassa mamillata var. gratiosa Monterosato 1912; Nassa mamillata var. lacunaris Monterosato 1912; Nassa mamillata var. propria Monterosato 1912; Nassa mamillata var. syracusana Monterosato 1912; Nassa mamillata var. tenuisculpta Monterosato 1912; Nassa mamillata var. tiesenhauseni Monterosato 1912; Nassa mamillata var. tricolor Monterosato 1912; Nassa mamillata var. valentina Monterosato 1912; Nassa monilifera Coen 1933; Nassa nitida Jeffreys 1867 (basionym); Nassa reticulata var. curta Bucquoy, Dautzenberg & Dollfus 1882; Nassa reticulata var. depicta Bucquoy, Dautzenberg & Dollfus 1882; Nassa reticulata var. mediterranea Milaschewitsch 1909; Nassa reticulata var. modesta Milaschewitsch 1909; Nassa reticulata var. pontica Kobelt 1878; Nassa reticulata var. rosea Bucquoy, Dautzenberg & Dollfus 1882; Nassa rochebrunei Locard 1887; Nassa servaini Locard 1887; Nassarius modestus (Milaschewitsch, 1909); Nassarius nitidus (Jeffreys, 1867); Planaxis mamillata Risso, 1826 (dubious synonym)

= Tritia nitida =

Species of gastropod

Tritia nitida is a species of sea snail, a marine gastropod mollusk in the family Nassariidae, the nassa mud snails or dog whelks.

== Distribution ==
This species occurs in European waters and in the Alboran Sea.

== Description ==
The length of the shell varies between 24 mm and 33 mm.
