= Tritia tavernai =

Scientific classification
- Kingdom: Animalia
- Phylum: Mollusca
- Class: Gastropoda
- Subclass: Caenogastropoda
- Order: Neogastropoda
- Family: Nassariidae
- Genus: Tritia
- Species: T. tavernai

Binomial name
- Tritia tavernai T. Cossignani, 2018

Species of gastropod

Tritia tavernai is a species of sea snail, a marine gastropod mollusc in the family Nassariidae, the nassa mud snails or dog whelks.

== Distribution ==
This species occurs in the Mediterranean Sea off Crete.
