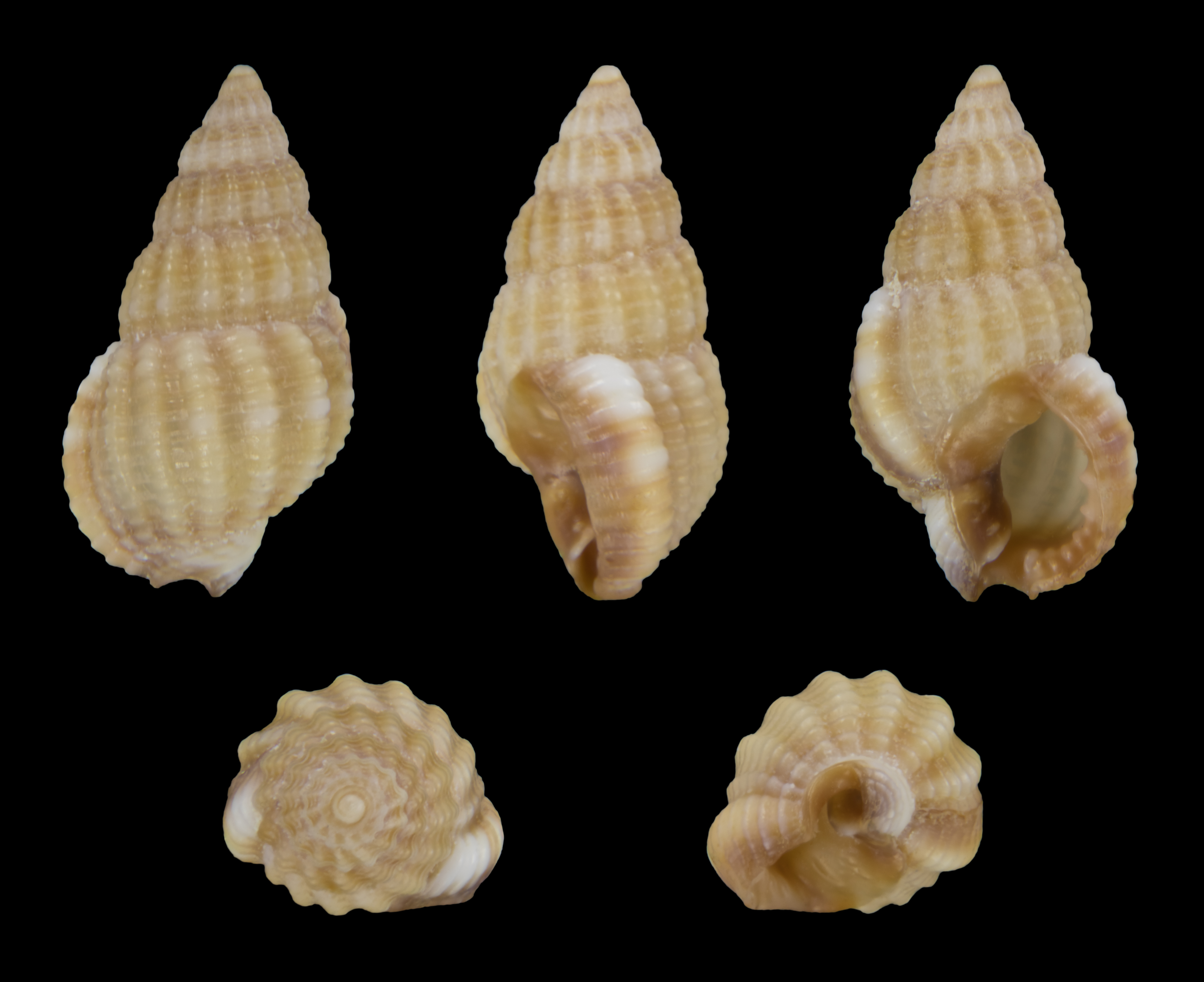
- Shell of Tritia varicosa

Scientific classification
- Kingdom: Animalia
- Phylum: Mollusca
- Class: Gastropoda
- Subclass: Caenogastropoda
- Order: Neogastropoda
- Family: Nassariidae
- Genus: Tritia
- Species: T. varicosa

Binomial name
- Tritia varicosa (W. Turton, 1825)

Synonyms
- Buccinum tritonium Blainvill, 1826; Hinia (Tritonella) varicosa (Turton, 1825); Hinia (Tritonella) varicosa paucicostata Nordsieck, 1974; Hinia pygmaea (Lamarck, 1822); Hinia varicosa (W. Turton, 1825); Hinia varicosa paucicostata F. Nordsieck, 1973 ·; Nassa (Tritonella) pygmaea (Lamarck, 1822); Nassa (Tritonella) pygmaea var. elongata Bucquoy, Dautzenberg & Dollfus, 1882; Nassa (Tritonella) pygmaea var. evaricosa Bucquoy, Dautzenberg & Dollfus, 1882; Nassa elongatula Locard, 1886; Nassa eutacta Locard, 1887; Nassa pygmaea (Lamarck, 1822); Nassa pygmaea var. elongata Bucquoy, Dautzenberg & Dollfus, 1882 ·; Nassa pygmaea var. evaricosa Bucquoy, Dautzenberg & Dollfus, 1882; Nassarius (Hinia) pygmaea (Lamarck, 1822); Nassarius (Hinia) varicosa; Nassarius pygmaeus (Lamarck, 1822); Nassarius varicosus (Turton, 1822); Ranella pygmaea Lamarck, 1822; Tritia pygmaea (Lamarck, 1822) ·; Tritonia varicosa Turton, 1825

= Tritia varicosa =

Species of gastropod

Tritia varicosa, common name the small dog whelk, is a species of sea snail, a marine gastropod mollusk in the family Nassariidae, the nassa mud snails or dog whelks.

== Distribution ==
This species occurs in European waters, the Mediterranean Sea, the Northeast Atlantic Ocean.

== Description ==
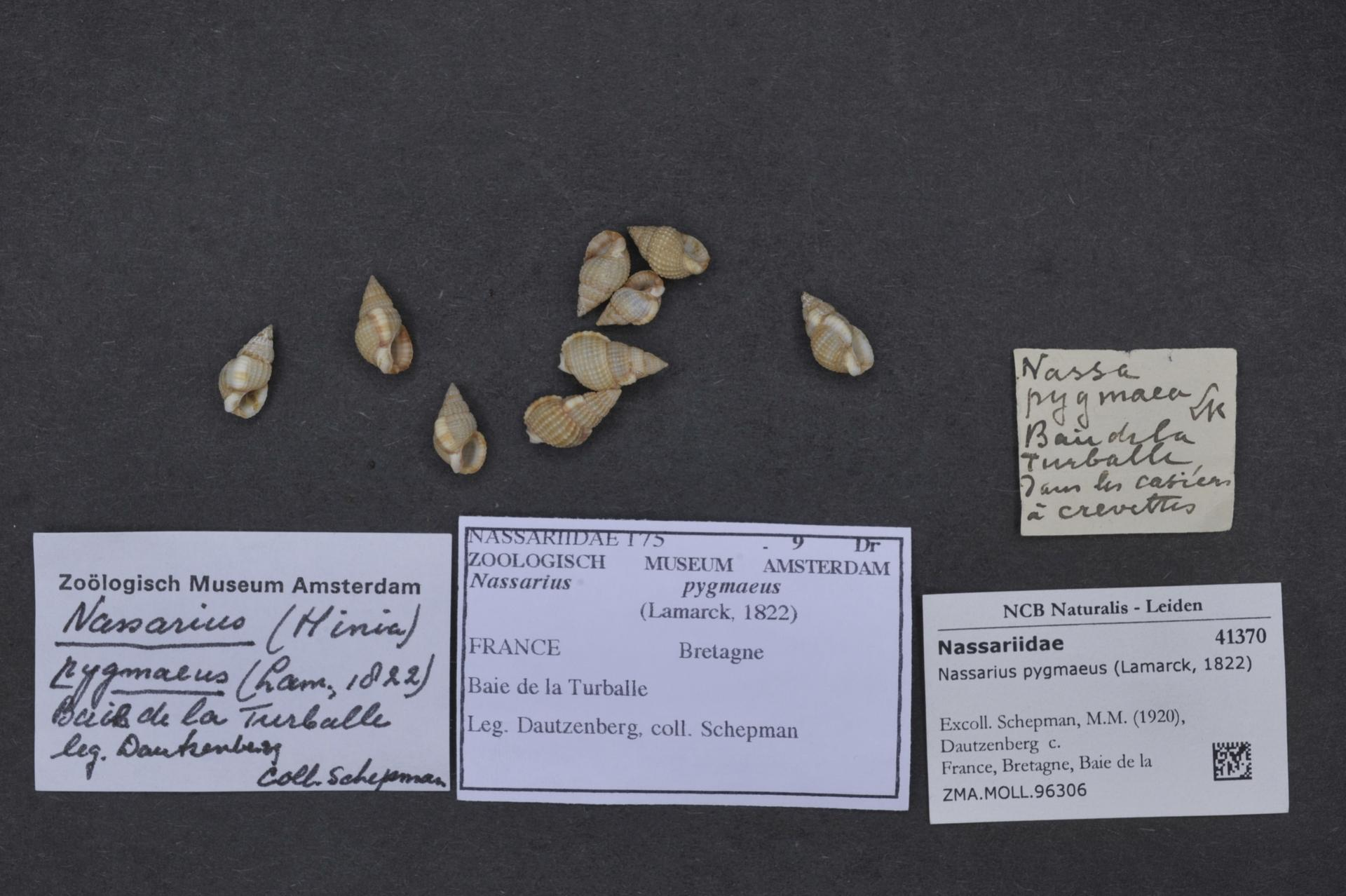
Tritia pygmaea shells.

The length of the shell varies between 5 mm and 8 mm.

(Original description) The shell is conic and whitish, marked with rufous and featuring two or three white varices. The seven whorls are flattish and decussate. The aperture is purple, toothed on each side, and the columella is white externally.

(Described as Ranella pygmaea) The shell is small, ovate-acute, ventricose, decussate, and appears reddish-ashy (cinereous-rufescent). It is adorned with tiny, numerous longitudinal costellae (fine ribs). The tail is short, and the outer lip is denticulate.
