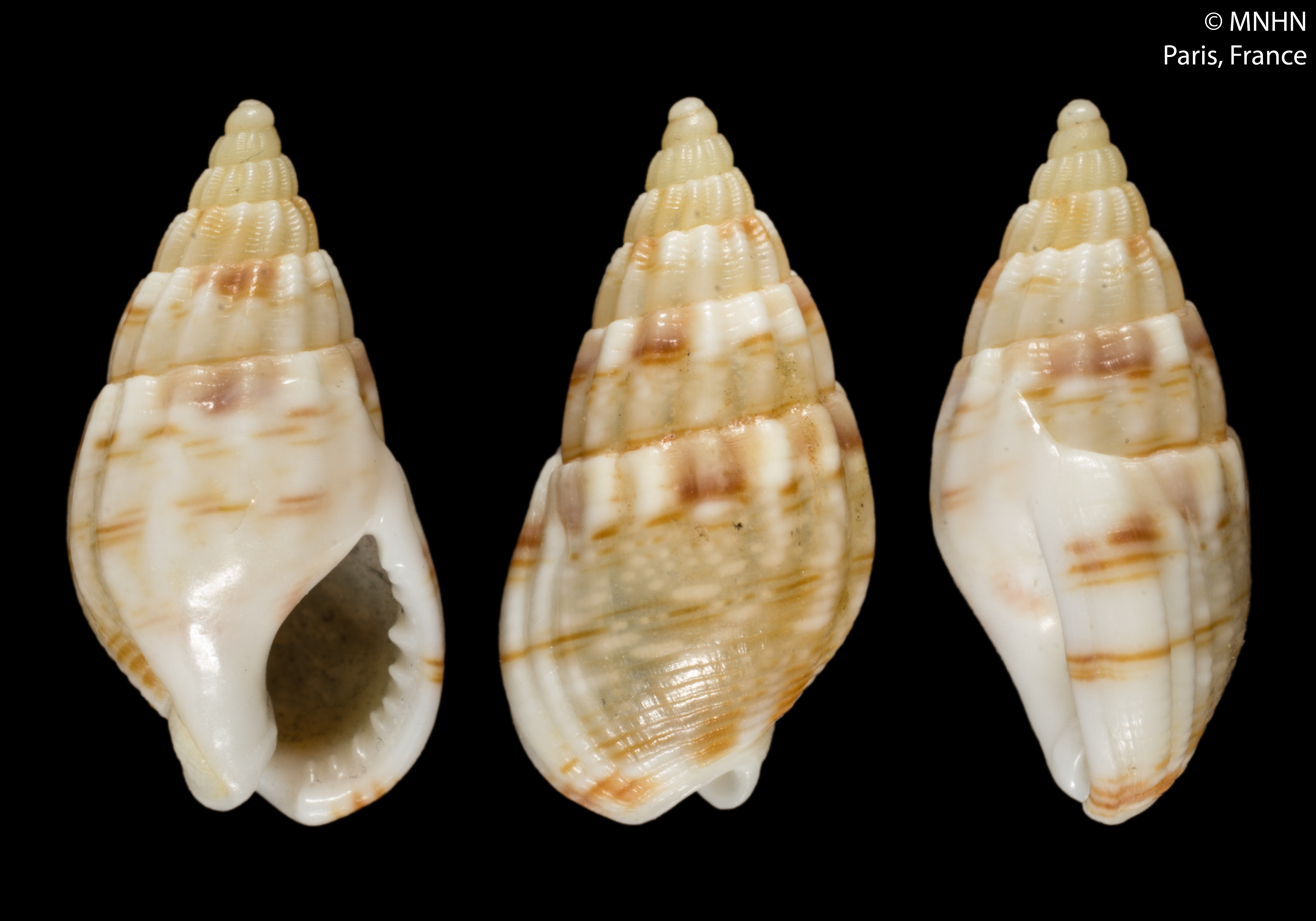
- Shell of Tritia tenuicosta (paralectotype at MNHN, Paris)

Scientific classification
- Kingdom: Animalia
- Phylum: Mollusca
- Class: Gastropoda
- Subclass: Caenogastropoda
- Order: Neogastropoda
- Family: Nassariidae
- Genus: Tritia
- Species: T. tenuicosta

Binomial name
- Tritia tenuicosta (Bucquoy, Dautzenberg & Dollfus, 1882)

Synonyms
- Nassa costulata var. tenuicosta Bucquoy, Dautzenberg & Dollfus, 1882 (basionym); Nassa ferussaci exigua Pallary, 1904

= Tritia tenuicosta =

Species of gastropod

Tritia tenuicosta is a species of sea snail, a marine gastropod mollusk in the family Nassariidae, the Nassa mud snails or dog whelks.

== Description ==
The length of the shell attains 9 mm.

(Description as Nassa ferussaci exigua) The shell is small, oval, and squat, with slightly convex whorls. These are adorned with tight, longitudinal ribs that are arched on the first whorls and flexuous on the body whorl. The folds extend down to the columellar canal. The shell is entirely decorated with fine, closely spaced decurrent striae.

The aperture is oval, a little less high (4 mm) than half of the total height (9 mm). The siphonal canal is strongly emarginate. The columella is short and slightly arched. The outer lip is weakly denticulate internally and thickened externally. The coloration is a uniform light reddish-grey, and the peristome is white.

== Distribution ==
This species occurs in the Mediterranean Sea off Tunisia.
