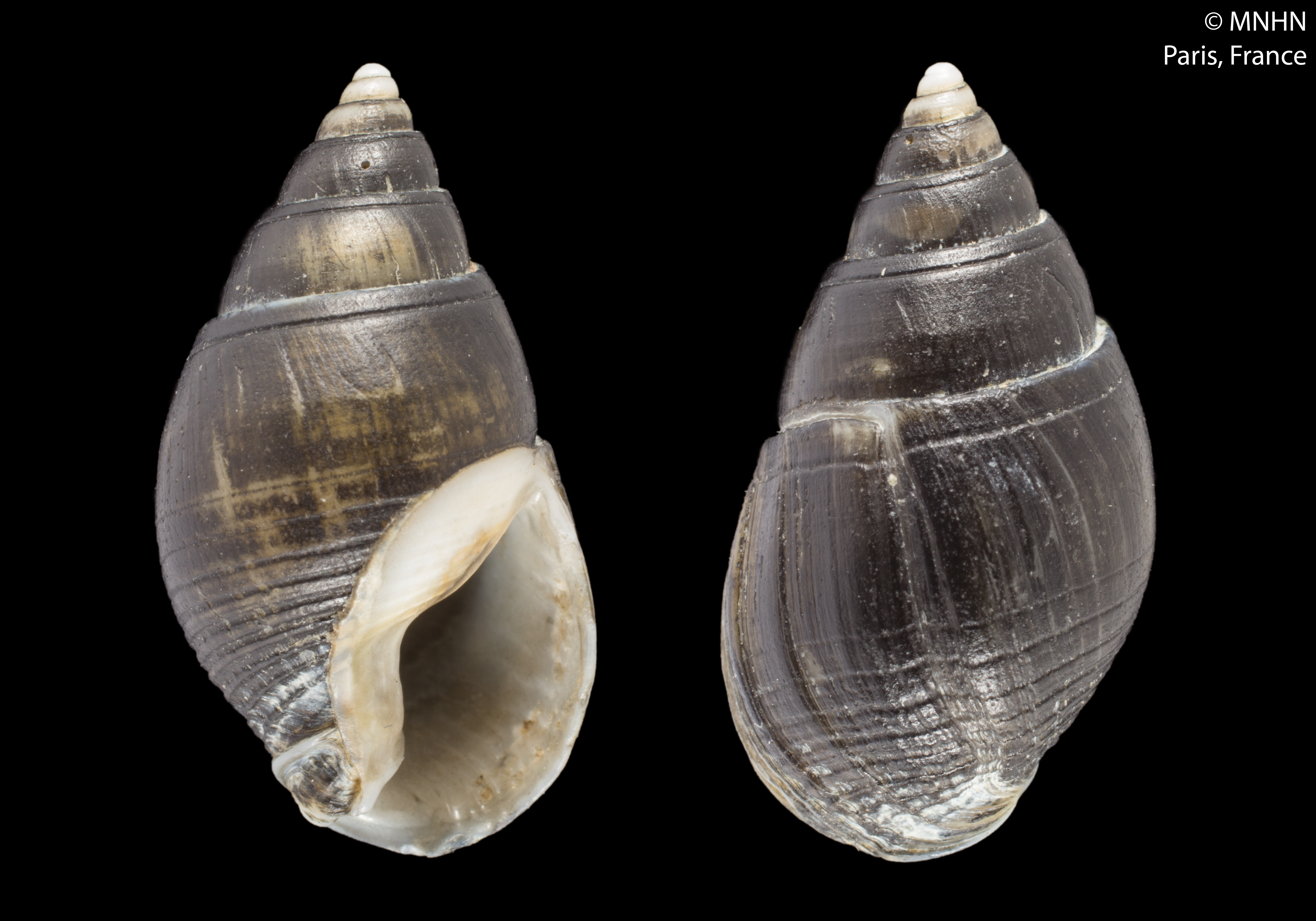
- Shell of Tritia ovoidea (syntype at MNHN, Paris)

Scientific classification
- Kingdom: Animalia
- Phylum: Mollusca
- Class: Gastropoda
- Subclass: Caenogastropoda
- Order: Neogastropoda
- Family: Nassariidae
- Genus: Tritia
- Species: T. ovoidea

Binomial name
- Tritia ovoidea (Locard, 1886)

Synonyms
- Nassa ovoidea Locard 1886 (basionym); Nassa semistriata var. cornea Locard 1887; Nassa semistriata var. costulata Locard 1887; Nassa semistriata var. curta Locard 1887; Nassa trifasciata Mac Andrew 1856; Nassarius cabrierensis ovoideus (Locard, 1886); Nassarius (Nassarius) cabrierensis ovoideus Locard, 1886; Nassarius ovoideus (Locard, 1886)

= Tritia ovoidea =

Species of gastropod

Tritia ovoidea is a species of sea snail, a marine gastropod mollusk in the family Nassariidae, the Nassa mud snails or dog whelks.

== Description ==
The length of the shell varies between 7 mm and 15 mm.

(Original description in French) The shell is of the same size as Tritia semistriata but has a much more inflated, almost exactly ovoid outline. The spire is short, with rounded whorls separated by a well-marked sutural line. The body whorl is very developed, especially in diameter. The aperture is not very high, well-rounded, and the columella is short. The callus is very thick.

== Distribution ==
This marine species occurs off Northwest Spain; in the Alboran Sea and in the Western Mediterranean Sea.
