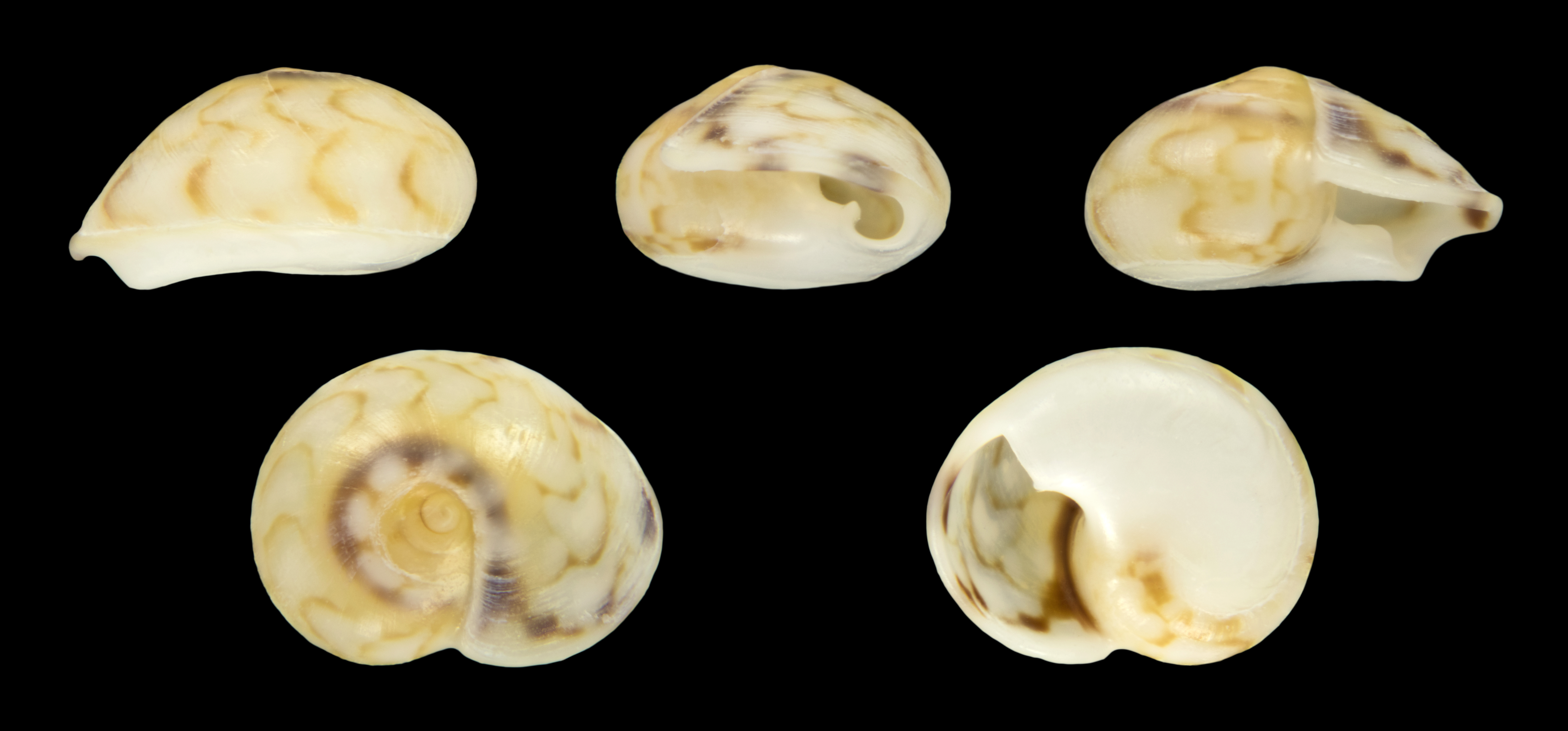
- shells of Tritia pellucida

Scientific classification
- Kingdom: Animalia
- Phylum: Mollusca
- Class: Gastropoda
- Subclass: Caenogastropoda
- Order: Neogastropoda
- Family: Nassariidae
- Genus: Tritia
- Species: T. pellucida

Binomial name
- Tritia pellucida ( Risso, 1826)

Synonyms
- Cyclonassa pellucida (Risso, 1826); Cyclope donovania Risso, 1826 (dubious synonym); Cyclope donovani Bucquoy, Dautzenberg & Dollfus, 1882 (unjustified emendation); Cyclope donovania [sic] (misspelling); Cyclope pellucida Risso, 1826; Cyclope pellucidus Risso, 1826 (incorrect gender agreement of specific epithet); Nana donovania (Risso, 1826); Nassarius pellucidus (Risso, 1826); Neritula donovani (Bucquoy, Dautzenberg & Dollfus, 1882); Panormella lofasi da Costa, 1840

= Tritia pellucida =

Species of gastropod

Tritia pellucida, common name: the cyclops nassa, is a species of sea snail, a marine gastropod mollusk in the family Nassariidae, the Nassa mud snails or dog whelks.

Even as Cyclope has been ruled to have a feminine gender by Opinion 793 of the ICZN, Risso published the name as masculine Cyclope pellucidus and the synonym Cyclope donovania as feminine.

== Description ==
The shell size varies between 5 mm and 12 mm.

== Distribution ==
This species occurs in the Mediterranean Sea (France, Spain, Italy, Greece, Turkey) and off Portugal; also in the Black Sea.
