= Tritia gelingsehensis =

Scientific classification
- Kingdom: Animalia
- Phylum: Mollusca
- Class: Gastropoda
- Subclass: Caenogastropoda
- Order: Neogastropoda
- Family: Nassariidae
- Genus: Tritia
- Species: T. gelingsehensis

Binomial name
- Tritia gelingsehensis (Beets, 1986)

Synonyms
- Hinia (Uzita) gelingsehensis Beets, 1986 ·

Species of gastropod

Tritia gelingsehensis is a species of sea snail, a marine gastropod mollusk in the family Nassariidae, the Nassa mud snails or dog whelks.

== Distribution ==
This species occurs off Kalimantan, Indonesia.
