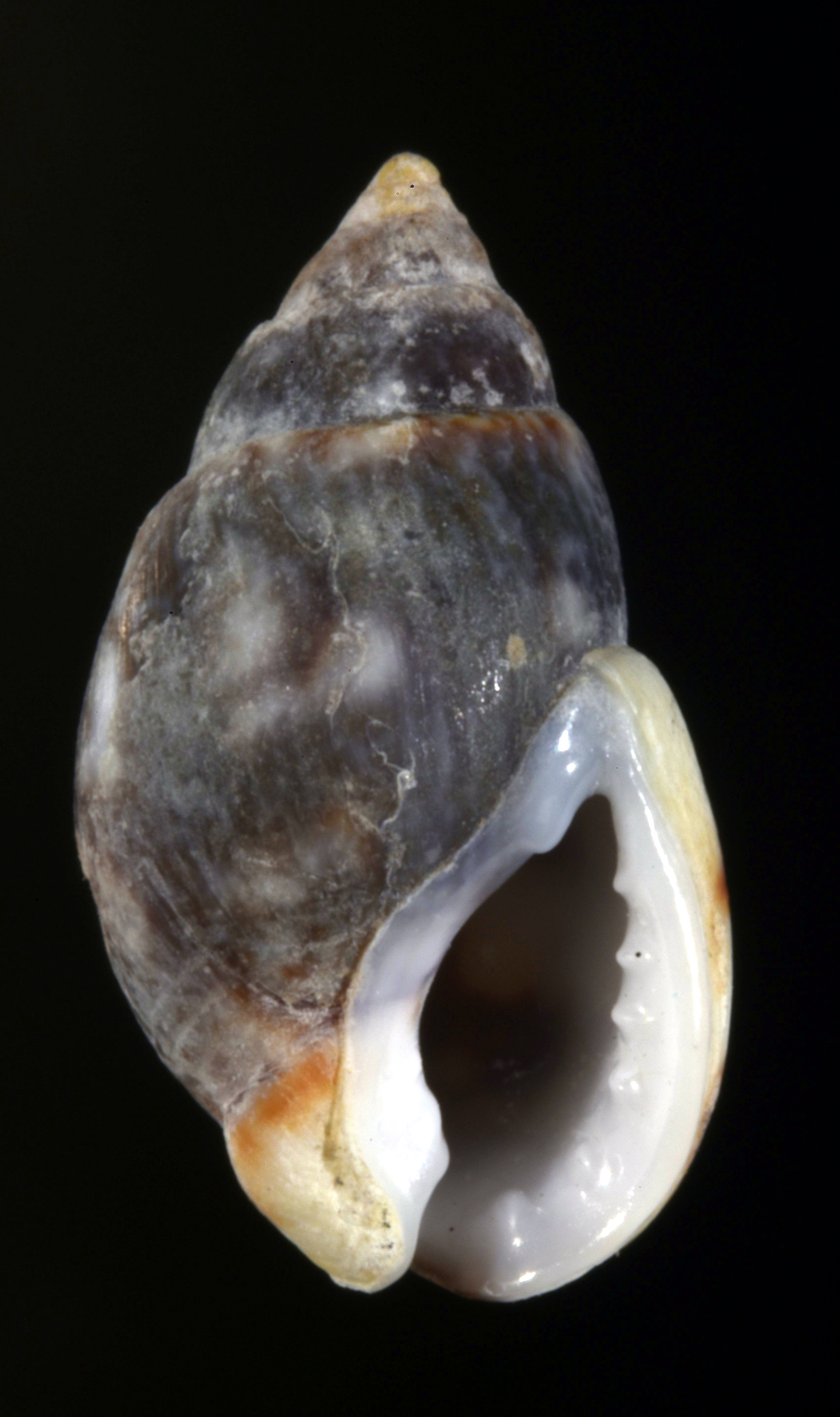
- Shell of Tritia conspersa (specimen at MNHN, Paris)

Scientific classification
- Kingdom: Animalia
- Phylum: Mollusca
- Class: Gastropoda
- Subclass: Caenogastropoda
- Order: Neogastropoda
- Family: Nassariidae
- Genus: Tritia
- Species: T. conspersa

Binomial name
- Tritia conspersa (Philippi, 1849)

Synonyms
- Amycla conspersa (Philippi, 1848); Amycla conspersa var. undulata Dautzenberg, 1890; Buccinum conspersum Philippi, 1849 (original combination); Nassa watsoni Kobelt, 1887 (doubtful synonym); Nassarius conspersus (Philippi, 1849)

= Tritia conspersa =

Species of gastropod

Tritia conspersa is a species of sea snail, a marine gastropod mollusk in the family Nassariidae, the Nassa mud snails or dog whelks.

== Description ==
The length of the shell varies between 10 mm and 15 mm.

(Original description in Latin) The smooth shell is oblong-conical. It is white, varied with reddish-brown spots and dots. The whorls are somewhat flattened, with the body whorl being quite rounded. The aperture is ovate and acutely angled superiorly. The outer lip is thickened externally and crenulated internally. The inner lip is callous, not expanded, and is terminated at the base by two nodules.

== Distribution ==
This species occurs in the Atlantic Ocean off the Canary Islands.
