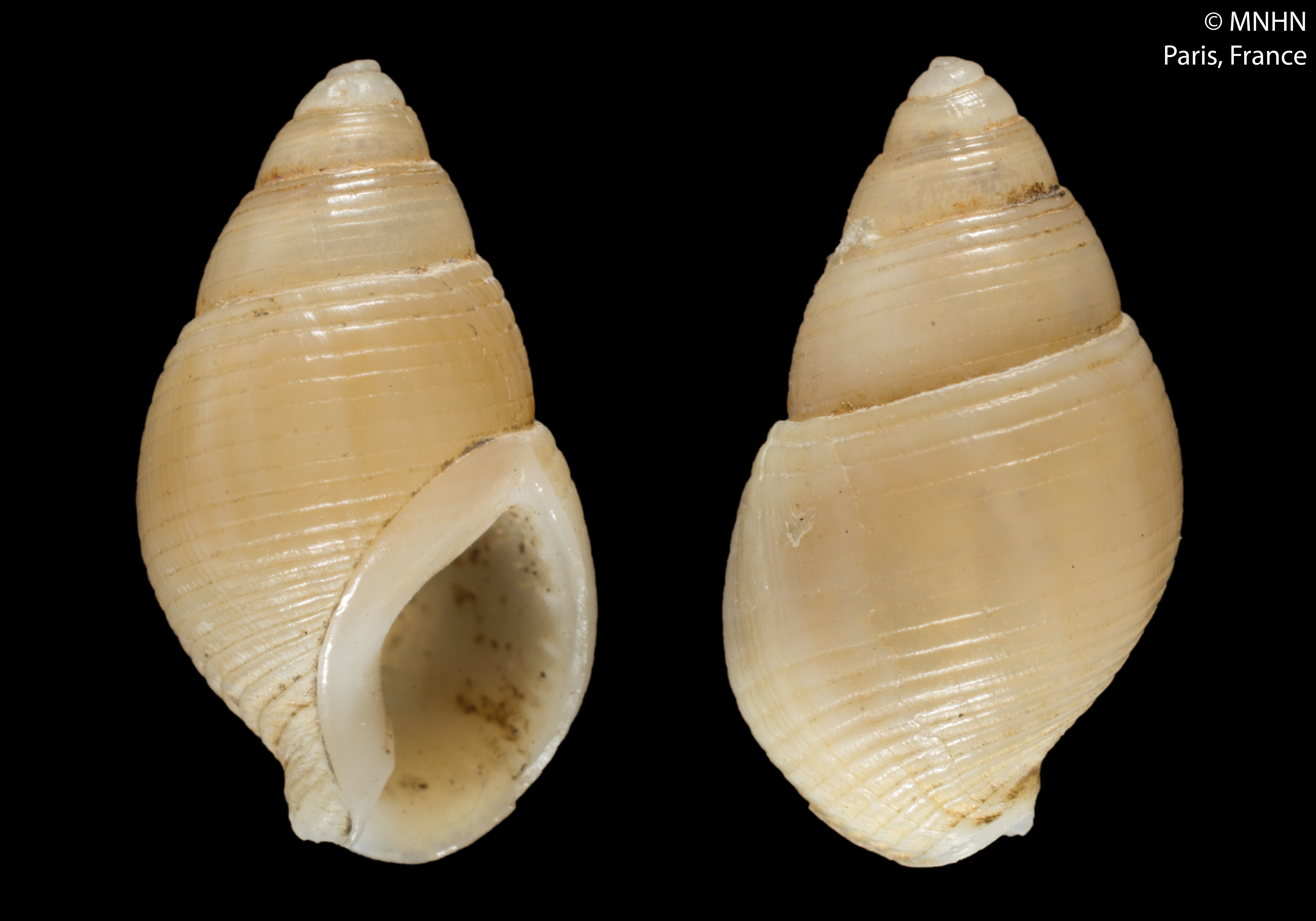
- Shell of Tritia turulosa

Scientific classification
- Kingdom: Animalia
- Phylum: Mollusca
- Class: Gastropoda
- Subclass: Caenogastropoda
- Order: Neogastropoda
- Family: Nassariidae
- Genus: Tritia
- Species: T. turulosa

Binomial name
- Tritia turulosa (Risso, 1826)

Synonyms
- Alectrion edwardsi (P. Fischer, 1882); Nassa edwardsi P. Fischer, 1882; Nassarius torulosus Risso, 1826; Nassarius (Nassarius) turulosus (Risso, 1826); Planaxis turulosa Risso, 1826 (basionym)

= Tritia turulosa =

Species of gastropod

Tritia turulosa is a species of sea snail, a marine gastropod mollusk in the family Nassariidae, the nassa mud snails or dog whelks.

== Description ==
The shell grows to a length of 9 mm.

(Described as Nassa edwardsi ) The shell is yellowish-flesh colored and appears obtuse at the apex. It comprises 6 whorls, which are subcanaliculate at the sutures and are adorned with equidistant spiral grooves (always conspicuous in the middle of the body whorl). The outer lip is thickened externally and plicate internally.

== Distribution ==
This species occurs in the Mediterranean Sea off Greece.
