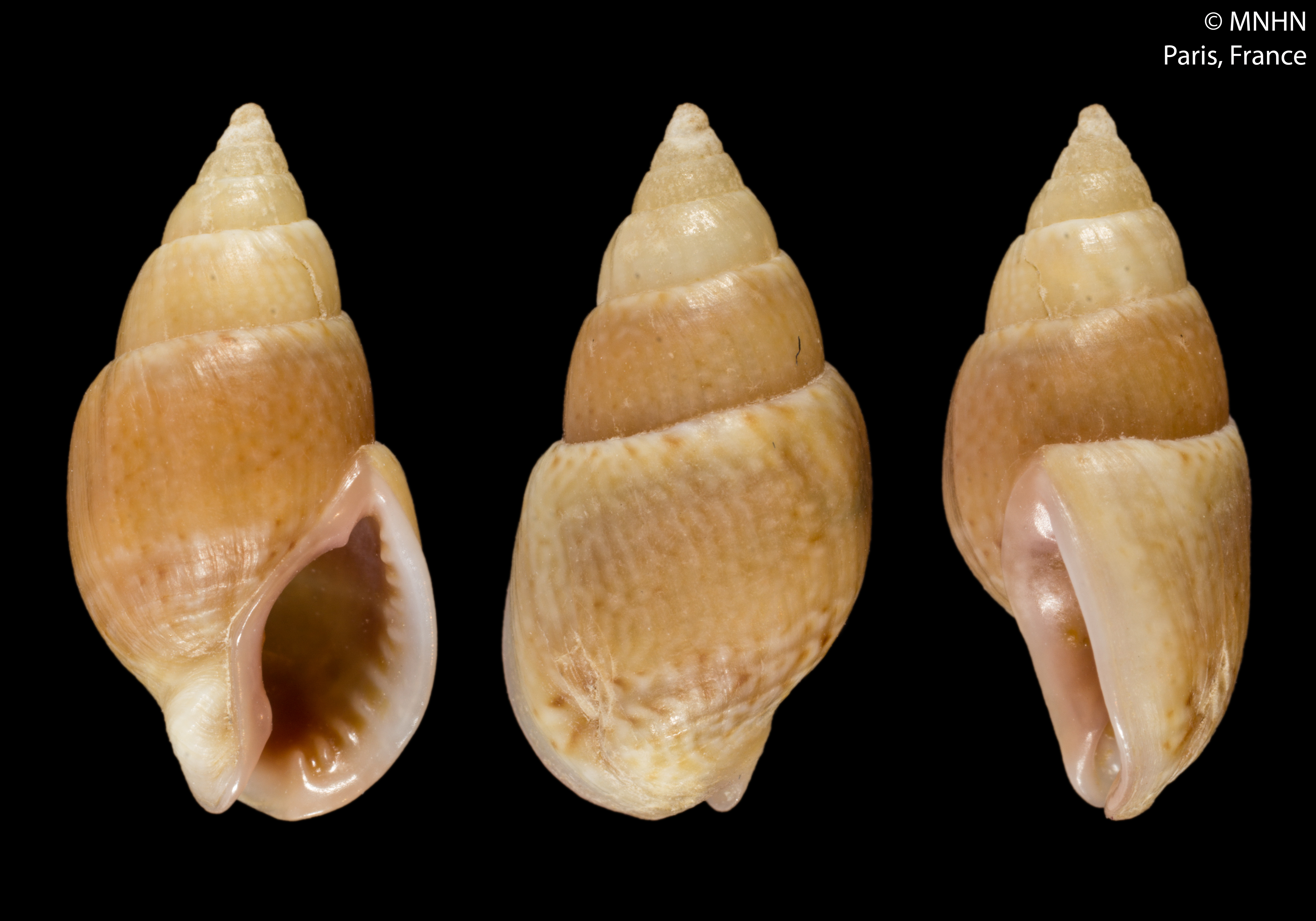
- Shell of Tritia pallaryana (holotype in the MNHN, Paris)

Scientific classification
- Kingdom: Animalia
- Phylum: Mollusca
- Class: Gastropoda
- Subclass: Caenogastropoda
- Order: Neogastropoda
- Family: Nassariidae
- Genus: Tritia
- Species: T. pallaryana

Binomial name
- Tritia pallaryana Aissaoui, Galindo, Puillandre & Bouchet, 2017

= Tritia pallaryana =

Species of gastropod

Tritia pallaryana is a species of sea snail, a marine gastropod mollusk in the family Nassariidae, the Nassa mud snails or dog whelks.

== Distribution ==
This species occurs in the Mediterranean Sea off Tunisia.
