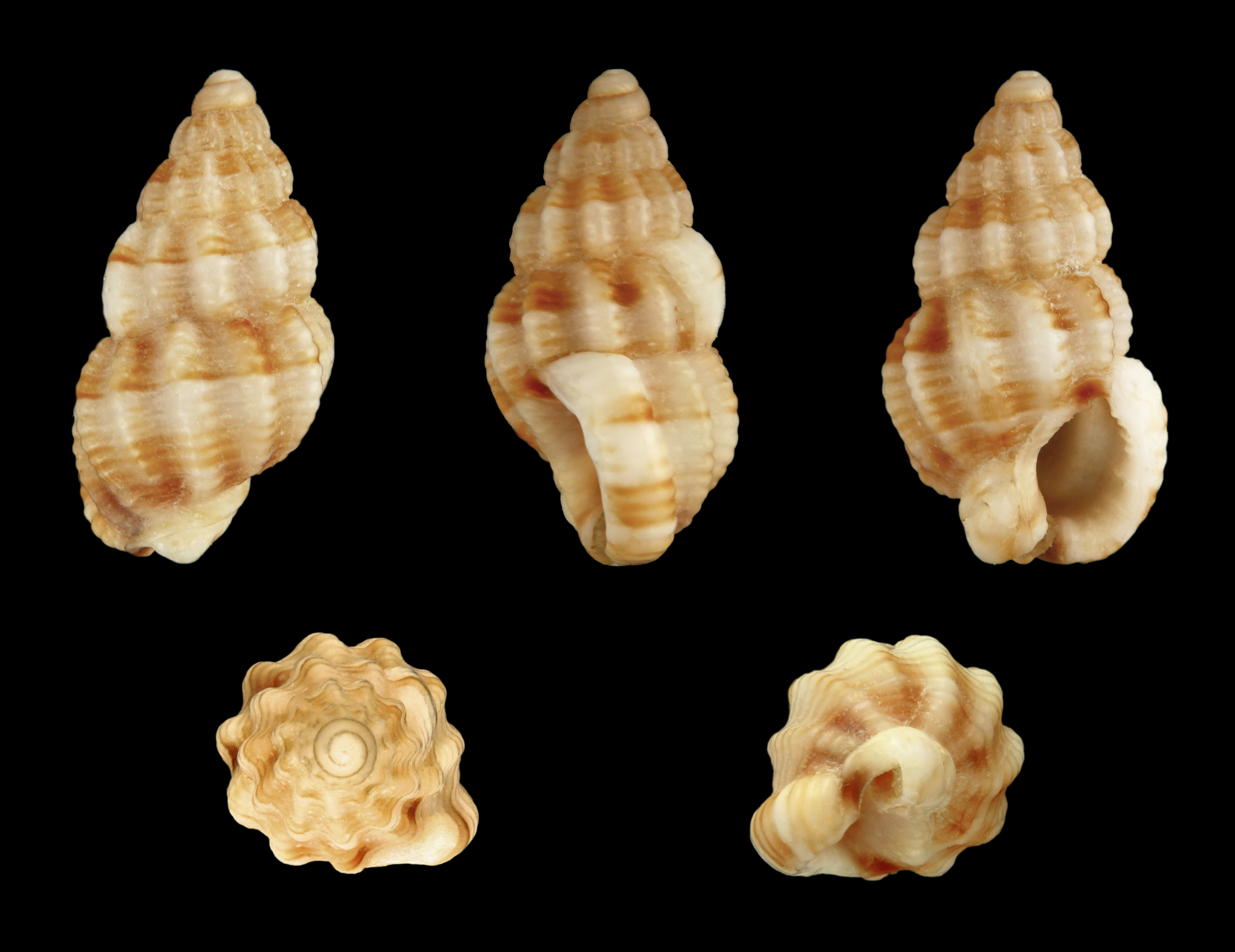

Scientific classification
- Kingdom: Animalia
- Phylum: Mollusca
- Class: Gastropoda
- Subclass: Caenogastropoda
- Order: Neogastropoda
- Family: Nassariidae
- Genus: Tritia
- Species: T. goreensis

Binomial name
- Tritia goreensis (Von Maltzan, 1884)

Synonyms
- Nassa goreensis Maltzan 1884; Nassarius goreensis (Maltzan, 1884)

= Tritia goreensis =

Species of gastropod

Tritia goreensis is a species of sea snail, a marine gastropod mollusk in the family Nassariidae, the Nassa mud snails or dog whelks.

== Description ==
The length of the shell varies between 7 mm and 12 mm.

(Original description in Latin) The shell is turreted, delicate, and whitish, indistinctly encircled with red at the suture and at the base of the shell. Comprising 8 convex whorls, these are separated by deep sutures and are regularly roughened with weak, very narrow, sub-straight ribs (19 on the body whorl) and spiral riblets decussating the transverse ribs (13 on the body whorl).

The aperture is ovate. The outer lip is acute, externally encircled by a strong white callus, and internally furnished with 6-7 somewhat weak striae and denticles. The inner lip is briefly appressed.

== Distribution ==
This species occurs in the Atlantic Ocean off Senegal and off Angola.
