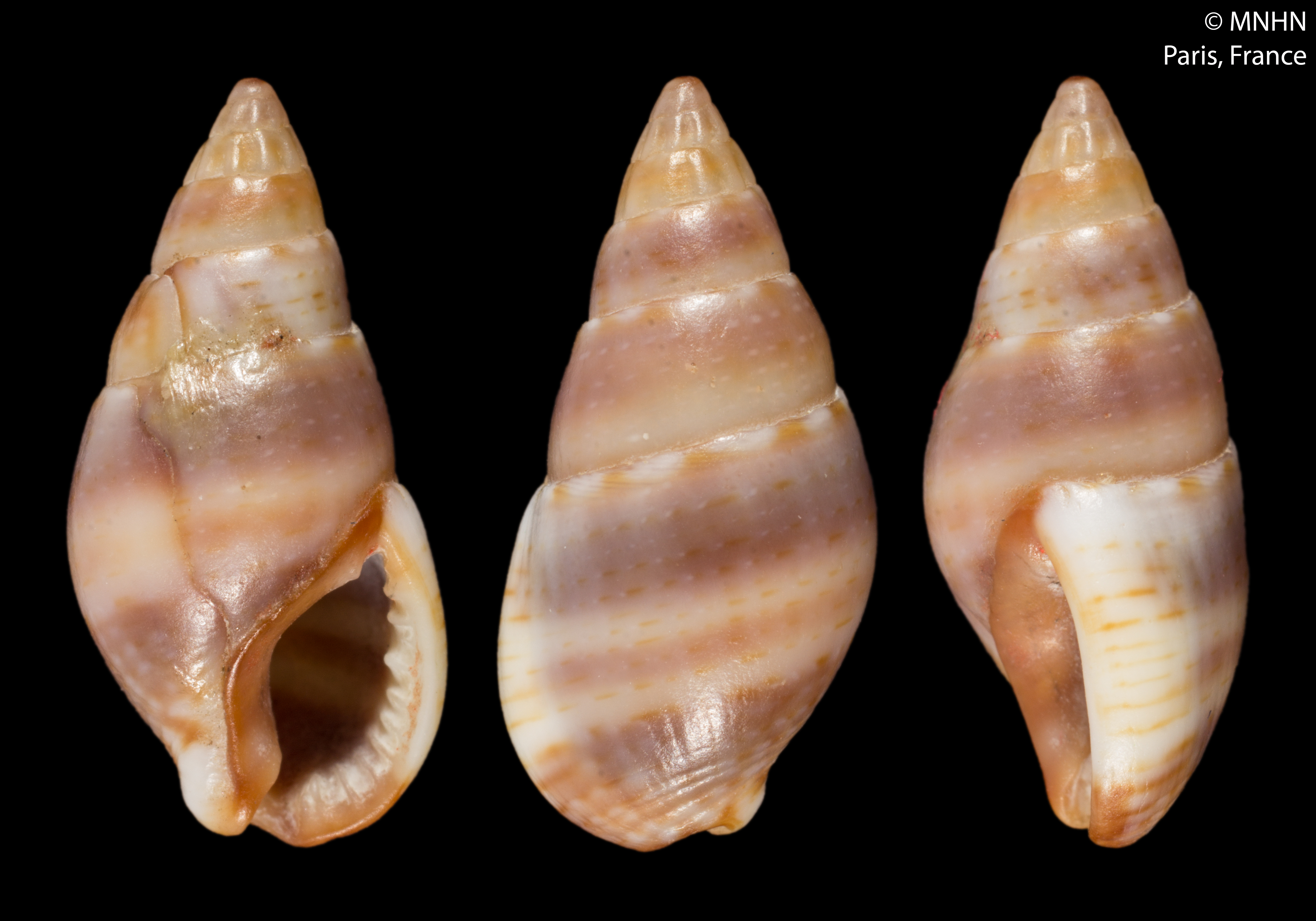
- Shell of Tritia elongata (lectotype at MNHN, Paris)

Scientific classification
- Kingdom: Animalia
- Phylum: Mollusca
- Class: Gastropoda
- Subclass: Caenogastropoda
- Order: Neogastropoda
- Family: Nassariidae
- Genus: Tritia
- Species: T. elongata

Binomial name
- Tritia elongata (Bucquoy, Dautzenberg & Dollfus, 1882)

Synonyms
- Amycla corniculum var. elongata Bucquoy, Dautzenberg & Dollfus, 1882 (basionym); Nassa (Amycla) corniculum var. elongata (Bucquoy, Dautzenberg & Dollfus, 1882)

= Tritia elongata =

Species of gastropod

Tritia elongata is a species of sea snail, a marine gastropod mollusk in the family Nassariidae, the Nassa mud snails or dog whelks.

== Description ==
The shell is smaller than Tritia corniculum and longer. This species appears to be the most variable in terms of coloration.

== Distribution ==
This species occurs in the Mediterranean Sea off France, Algeria and Greece.
