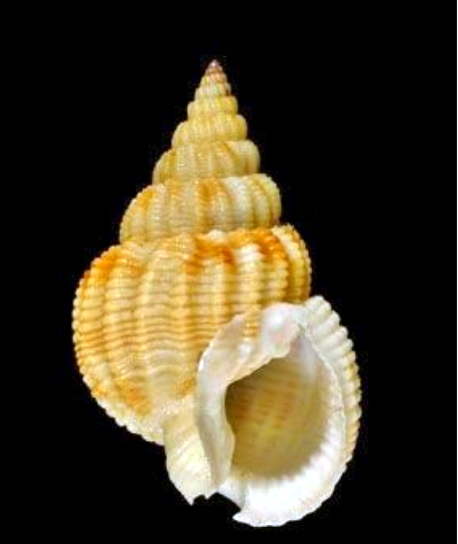
- Shell of Tritia denticulata (specimen in the Natural History Museum Rotterdam)

Scientific classification
- Kingdom: Animalia
- Phylum: Mollusca
- Class: Gastropoda
- Subclass: Caenogastropoda
- Order: Neogastropoda
- Family: Nassariidae
- Genus: Tritia
- Species: T. denticulata

Binomial name
- Tritia denticulata (Adams A., 1852)

Synonyms
- Caesia prismatica Brocchi, G.B.; Nassa denticulata A. Adams, 1852; Nassa denticulatus A. Adams, 1852 (original combination); Nassa limata var. conferta Martens, 1876; Nassa renovata Monterosato, 1878; Nassarius denticulatus (A. Adams, 1852)

= Tritia denticulata =

Species of gastropod

Tritia denticulata is a species of sea snail, a marine gastropod mollusk in the family Nassariidae, the Nassa mud snails or dog whelks.

== Description ==
The length of the shell varies between 20 mm and 35 mm. The shell has a high conical spire and a globose body whorl. The protoconch is cyrtoconoid (almost with the shape of a cone, but having convex sides) with about 3 whorls. The teleoconch contains 7–8 convex whorls, with a sculpture of fine, regular spiral cords, broader than the interspaces, and with flexuous axial folds, which are rather swollen beneath the suture and make it undulated and channelled. The base of the body whorl contains a strong groove delimiting the outer part of the siphonal canal. The aperture is rounded. The outer lip is somewhat thickened externally although not forming a varix. Inside the outer lip there are numerous denticles elongated in the spiral direction and alternating stronger and weaker. Parietal and columellar edges form a callus with a raised edge. There is a distinct parietal plait present. The colour of the shell is yellowish with a broad subsutural band of darker blotches; the protoconch dark brown; and the aperture white.

== Distribution ==
This species occurs in the Eastern Atlantic, from southern Portugal to Angola, also off the Cape Verde islands, Canary Islands, Madeira and Lusitanian seamounts. It occurs in the Mediterranean Sea only in the Alboran Sea and off the Algerian coast. It is moderately common in 50–200 m. Gorringe, Ampère and Seine seamounts, rare in 130–310 m.
