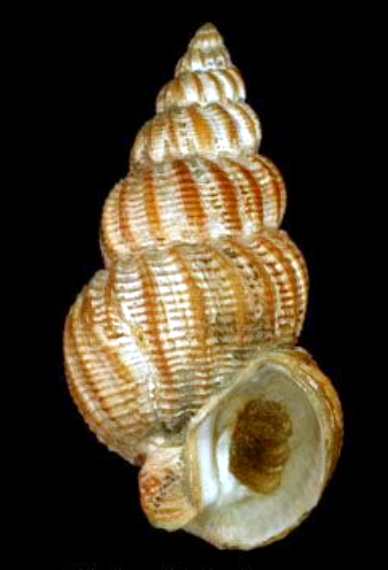
- Shell of Tritia lima (specimen at Natural History Museum Rotterdam)

Scientific classification
- Kingdom: Animalia
- Phylum: Mollusca
- Class: Gastropoda
- Subclass: Caenogastropoda
- Order: Neogastropoda
- Family: Nassariidae
- Subfamily: Nassariinae
- Genus: Tritia
- Species: T. lima

Binomial name
- Tritia lima (Dillwyn, 1817)

Synonyms
- Buccinum lima Chemnitz, 1795 (unavailable name: published in a work rejected by ICZN direction 1; available from Dillwyn, 1817); Buccinum lima Dillwyn, 1817 (original description); Buccinum limatum Philippi, 1836; Buccinum limatum Chemnitz, 1795 (unavailable name: non-binomial, published in a work rejected by ICZN direction 1; available from Philippi, 1836); Buccinum scalariforme Kiener, 1834; Conopleura aliena Smriglio, Mariottini & Calascibetta, 1999; Nassa limata (Chemnitz, 1795) (not available: published in a work rejected by ICZN); Nassa limata var. paucicostata del Prête, 1883; Nassa limata var. robusta Monterosato, 1890; Nassa praelonga Monterosato, 1891; Nassarius lima (Dillwyn, 1817); Nassarius robustus (Monterosato, 1890)

= Tritia lima =

Species of gastropod

Tritia lima is a species of sea snail, a marine gastropod mollusk in the family Nassariidae.

== Description ==
The size of an adult shell varies between 5 mm and 42 mm.

== Distribution ==
This species occurs in the Mediterranean Sea off Greece and in the Tyrrhenian Sea; also in the temperate North Atlantic, extending from the Cantabrian Sea to the Canary Islands.
