= Tritia vincenzoi =

Scientific classification
- Kingdom: Animalia
- Phylum: Mollusca
- Class: Gastropoda
- Subclass: Caenogastropoda
- Order: Neogastropoda
- Family: Nassariidae
- Genus: Tritia
- Species: T. vincenzoi

Binomial name
- Tritia vincenzoi T. Cossignani, 2021

Species of gastropod

Tritia vincenzoi is a species of sea snail, a marine gastropod mollusk in the family Nassariidae, the Nassa mud snails or dog whelks.

== Distribution ==
This species occurs in the Atlantic Ocean off Morocco
