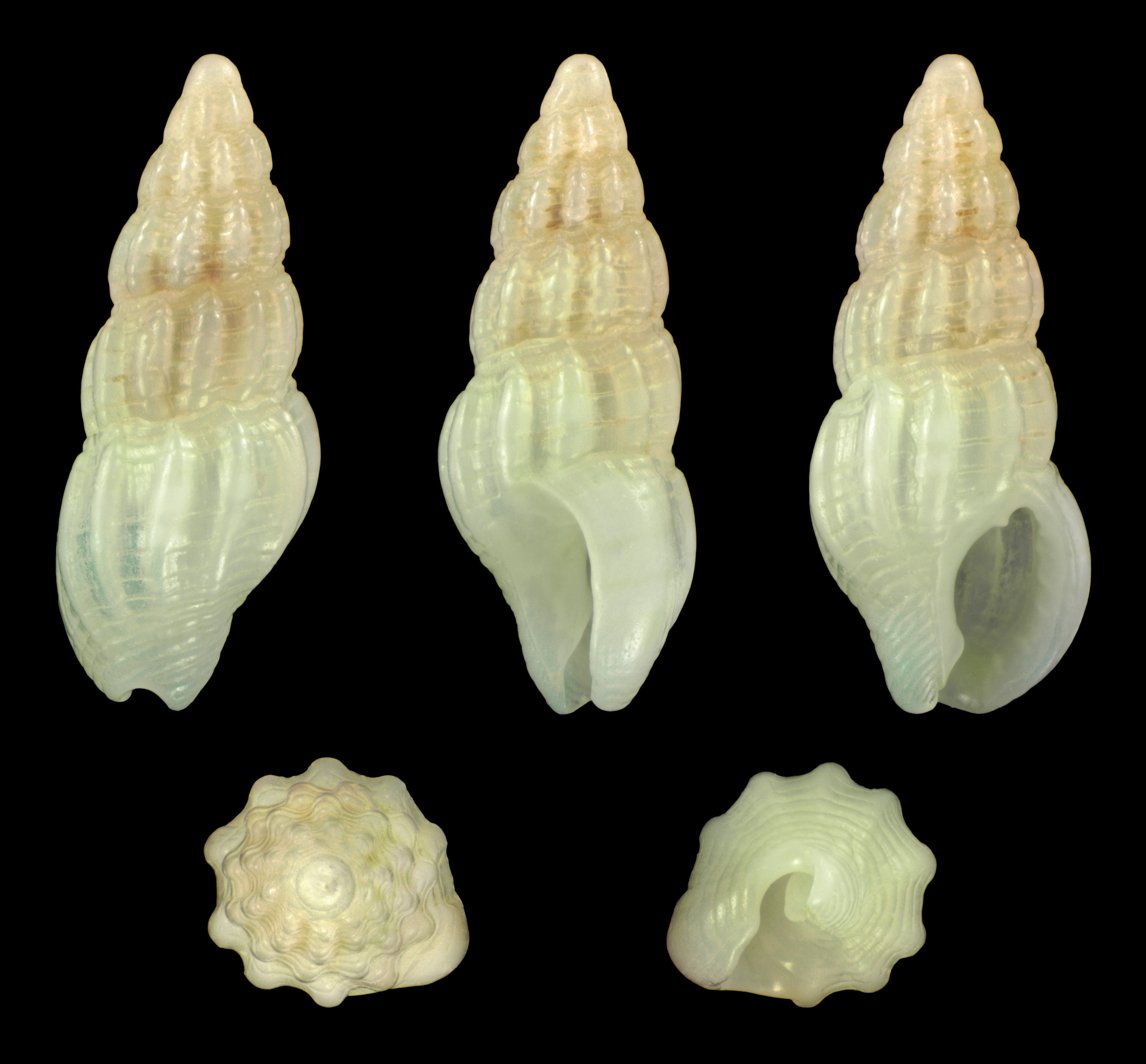
- A shell of Tritia tingitana

Scientific classification
- Kingdom: Animalia
- Phylum: Mollusca
- Class: Gastropoda
- Subclass: Caenogastropoda
- Order: Neogastropoda
- Family: Nassariidae
- Genus: Tritia
- Species: T. tingitana

Binomial name
- Tritia tingitana (Pallary, 1901)

Synonyms
- Nassa tingitina Pallary, 1901 (basionym); Nassa tingitana var. articulata Pallary 1920; Nassarius (Aciculina) tingitanus (Pallary, 1901); Nassarius tingitanus (Pallary, 1901)

= Tritia tingitana =

Species of gastropod

Tritia tingitana is a species of sea snail, a marine gastropod mollusk in the family Nassariidae, the nassa mud snails or dog whelks.

== Description ==
The length of the shell varies between 8 mm and 11 mm; its diameter is 3.5 mm.

(Original description in Latin) The shell is strongly elongated for its genus. The spire is exserted. It comprises 8 whorls: the first 3 are smooth, while the others are sculptured with strong longitudinal ribs and impressed transverse striae. On the penultimate whorl, 9 ribs and striae can be counted.

The aperture is small, angled superiorly, and terminates inferiorly in a short tail. The outer lip is internally sulcate (grooved) and externally margined. The color everywhere is deep tawny.

== Distribution ==
This species occurs in the Alboran Sea, Western Mediterranean Sea.
