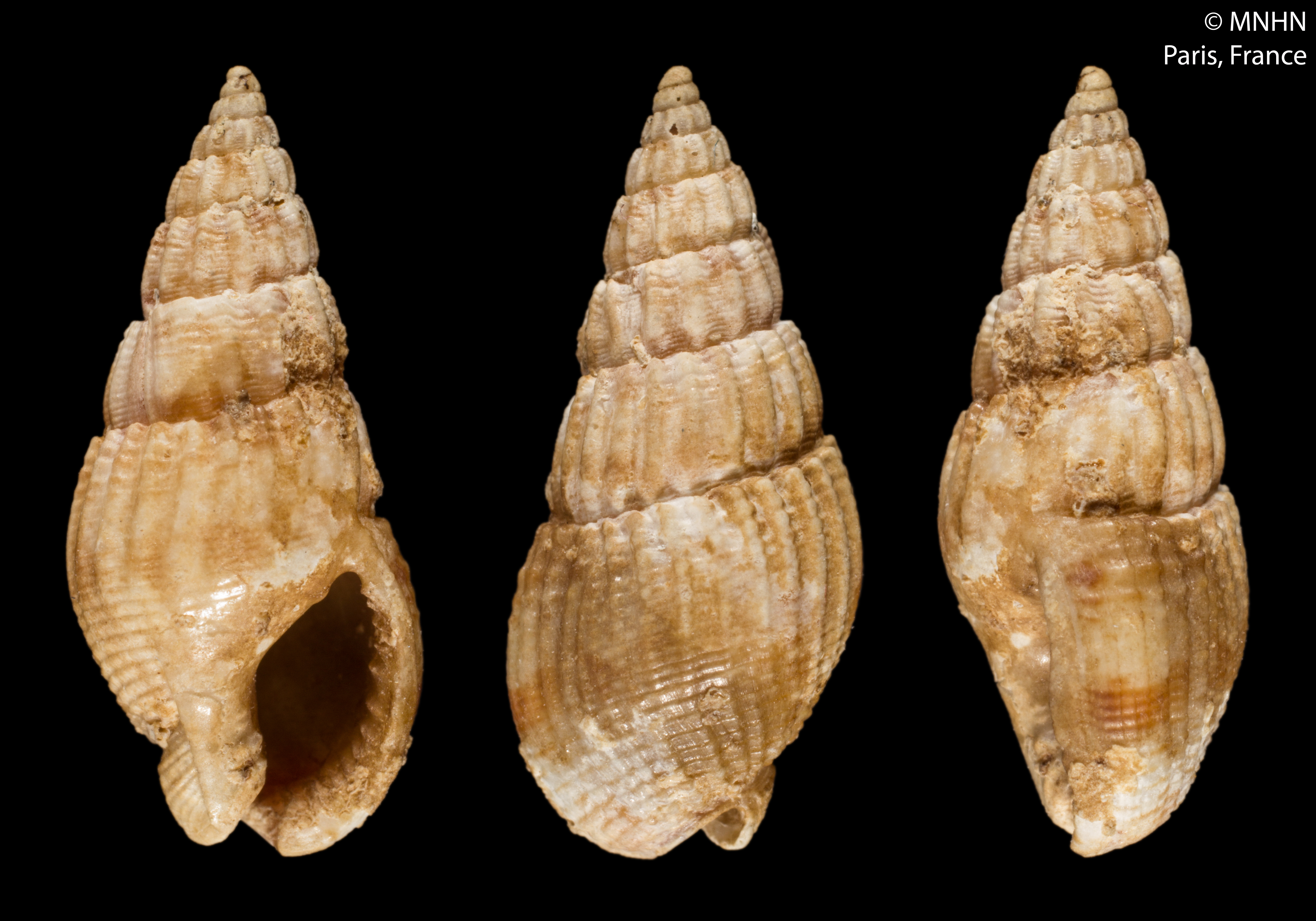
- Shell of Tritia lanceolata (lectotype at MNHN, Paris)

Scientific classification
- Kingdom: Animalia
- Phylum: Mollusca
- Class: Gastropoda
- Subclass: Caenogastropoda
- Order: Neogastropoda
- Family: Nassariidae
- Genus: Tritia
- Species: T. lanceolata

Binomial name
- Tritia lanceolata (Bucquoy, Dautzenberg & Dollfus, 1882)

Synonyms
- Nassa costulata var. lanceolata Bucquoy, Dautzenberg & Dollfus, 1882 (basionym); Nassa costulata var. turgida Bucquoy, Dautzenberg & Dollfus, 1882; Nassa ferussaci arcuata Pallary, 1904 ·; Nassa ferussaci var. claudoni Pallary, 1906

= Tritia lanceolata =

Species of gastropod

Tritia lanceolata is a species of sea snail, a marine gastropod mollusk in the family Nassariidae, the Nassa mud snails or dog whelks.

== Description ==
The length of the shell attains 15 mm, its diameter 6.5 mm.

Very elongated variety, finely ribbed, also found on sponges

(Description as Nassa ferussaci arcuata) The shell is bulging and strongly ribbed. On the first whorls, the ribs are arched; on the body whorl, they are flexuous. The ribs and the intervals are furrowed by decurrent striae which create a reticulation less pronounced than that of Tritia reticulata, to which this species bears a resemblance. The aperture is weakly compressed on the side of the outer lip; the mode of coloration is similar to that of Nassa subdiaphana.

== Distribution ==
This species occurs in the Mediterranean Sea off Tunisia.
