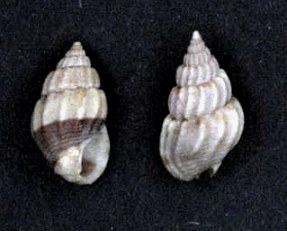
- Two views of a shell of Tritia miga (museum specimens at Naturalis Biodiversity Center)

Scientific classification
- Kingdom: Animalia
- Phylum: Mollusca
- Class: Gastropoda
- Subclass: Caenogastropoda
- Order: Neogastropoda
- Family: Nassariidae
- Genus: Tritia
- Species: T. miga

Binomial name
- Tritia miga (Bruguière, 1789)

Synonyms
- Buccinum miga Bruguière, 1789 (original combination); Nassarius miga (Bruguière, 1789)

= Tritia miga =

Species of gastropod

Tritia miga is a species of sea snail, a marine gastropod mollusc in the family Nassariidae, the nassa mud snails or dog whelks.

== Description ==
The length of the shell varies between 13 mm and 20 mm.

The ovate, conical shell has an ash-gray color. It is ornamented with a reddish zone at the suture, and another, much wider and more deeply colored band, at the base of the body whorl. The spire is composed of seven rounded, swollen whorls, provided with ten or twelve distant and slightly oblique folds, marked also by a great number of transverse striae, which intersect the folds at right angles, and become more apparent near the base of the body whorl. The aperture is whitish or violet colored and nearly round. The outer lip is slightly margined, covered internally with transverse striae. The columella is arcuated, and twisted at its base. The inner lip, which partially covers it, is indistinctly striated, and forms a wrinkle at the upper part.

== Distribution ==
This species occurs in the Atlantic Ocean off Senegal, Gambia and Mauritania.
