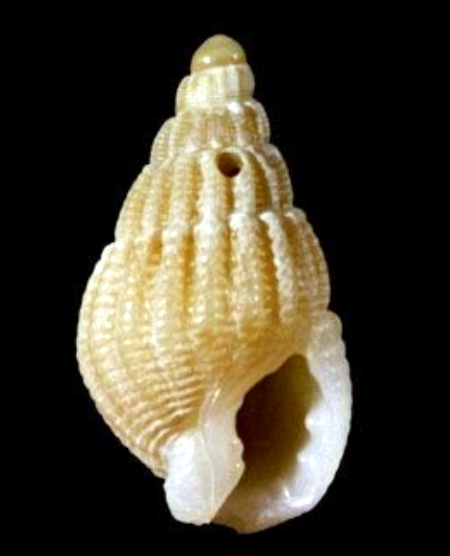
- Shell of Tritia coralligena (specimen at the Natural History Museum Rotterdam)

Scientific classification
- Kingdom: Animalia
- Phylum: Mollusca
- Class: Gastropoda
- Subclass: Caenogastropoda
- Order: Neogastropoda
- Family: Nassariidae
- Genus: Tritia
- Species: T. coralligena

Binomial name
- Tritia coralligena (Pallary, 1900)

Synonyms
- Nassa coralligena Pallary, 1900; Nassarius coralligenus (Pallary, 1900); Nassarius (Hima) coralligenus (Pallary, 1900)

= Tritia coralligena =

Species of gastropod

Tritia coralligena is a species of sea snail, a marine gastropod mollusk in the family Nassariidae, the Nassa mud snails or dog whelks.

== Description ==
The length of the shell varies between 7 mm and 12 mm, and has a waxy color.

(Original description in French) This is an oil-colored, wax-like species, similar to Tritia corrugata (Brocchi, 1814) from which it differs by its more voluminous protoconch and its more widely spaced and striated ribs. Of all the varieties of Nassarius ferussaci, it is the variety castanea that offers the most analogies with our form. However, Tritia coralligena is more obese, its aperture is higher and thicker, its ribs are more arched, the intervals between the ribs are strongly striated, and finally, the base of the siphonal canal is wider.

== Distribution ==
This species occurs in the Atlantic Ocean off Southern Spain, Morocco and the Canary Islands; in the Alboran Sea.
