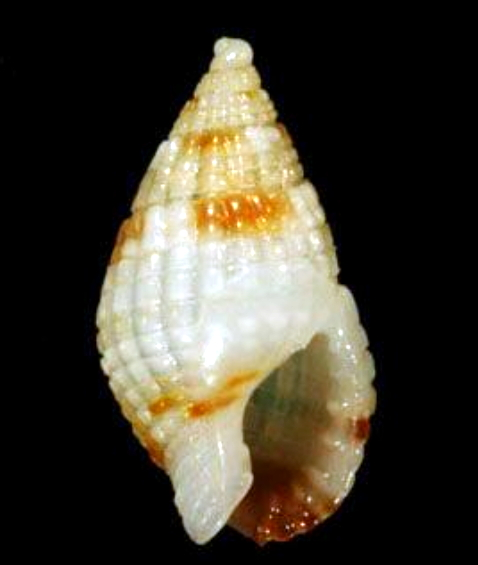
- Shell of Tritia louisi (specimen at the Natural History Museum Rotterdam)

Scientific classification
- Kingdom: Animalia
- Phylum: Mollusca
- Class: Gastropoda
- Subclass: Caenogastropoda
- Order: Neogastropoda
- Family: Nassariidae
- Genus: Tritia
- Species: T. louisi

Binomial name
- Tritia louisi (Pallary, 1912)

Synonyms
- Nassa cuvierii var. louisi Pallary 1912 (basionym); Nassarius (Telasco) louisi (Pallary, 1912); Nassarius louisi (Pallary, 1912); Nassarius zambakidisi Nofroni & Savona 1987

= Tritia louisi =

Species of gastropod

Tritia louisi is a species of sea snail, a marine gastropod mollusk in the family Nassariidae, the Nassa mud snails or dog whelks.

== Description ==
The shell grows to a length of 6 mm.

(Original description in French) This type is well distinct from Tritia corrugata by its surface with salient reticulation, resembling a Tritia reticulata in miniature

== Distribution ==
This species occurs in the Eastern Mediterranean Sea off Syria and Cyprus.
