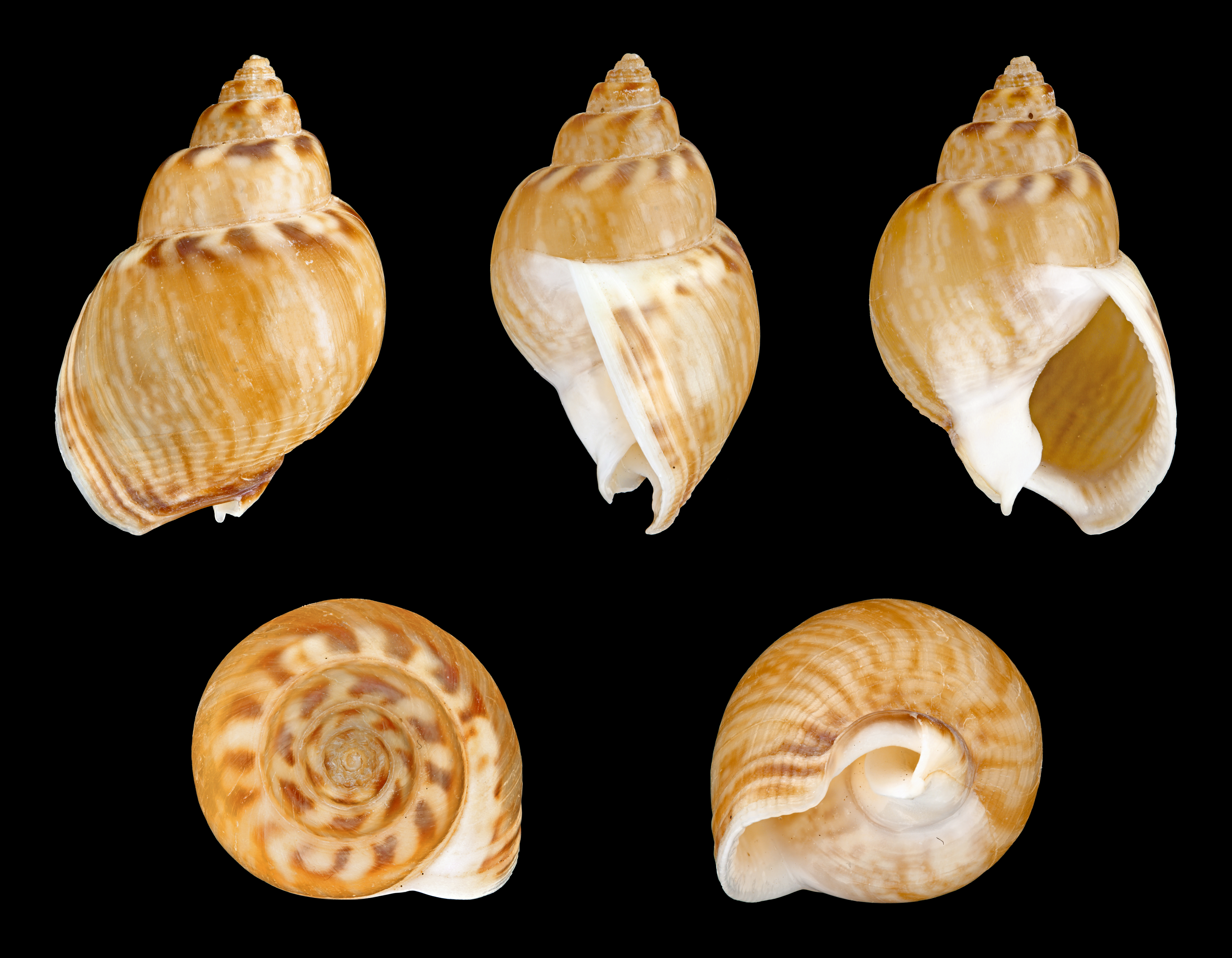
- Five views of a shell of Tritia mutabilis

Scientific classification
- Kingdom: Animalia
- Phylum: Mollusca
- Class: Gastropoda
- Subclass: Caenogastropoda
- Order: Neogastropoda
- Family: Nassariidae
- Genus: Tritia
- Species: T. mutabilis

Binomial name
- Tritia mutabilis (Linnaeus, 1758)

Synonyms
- Buccinum foliorum Gmelin 1791; Buccinum foliosum Wood W. 1818; Buccinum gibbum Bruguière 1789; Buccinum inflatum Lamarck 1822; Buccinum jaspideum Link 1807; Buccinum mutabile Linnaeus, 1758 (basionym); Buccinum rufulum Kiener 1834; Buccinum tessulatum Gmelin 1791; Nassa companyoi Fontannes 1882; Nassa ebenacea Gennari 1866; Nassa gibba Gray M.E. 1850; Nassa helvetica Peyrot 1925; Nassa mediterranea Risso 1826; Nassa mutabilis var. curta Pallary 1904; Nassa mutabilis goodalliana var. minuscula Pallary 1900; Nassa mutabilis var. minor Pallary 1900; Nassa mutabilis var. minuscularia Pallary 1904; Nassa mutabilis var. procera Pallary 1906; Nassa mutabilis var. senilis Pallary, 1910; Nassarius mutabilis (Linnaeus, 1758); Nassarius (Sphaeronassa) mutabilis (Linnaeus, 1758); Sphaeronassa adriatica Coen 1933; Sphaeronassa deformis Coen 1933; Sphaeronassa globulina Locard 1886; Sphaeronassa mutabilis (Linnaeus, 1758); Sphaeronassa umbilicata Coen 1933

= Tritia mutabilis =

Species of gastropod

Tritia mutabilis, common name : the mutable nassa, is a species of sea snail, a marine gastropod mollusk in the family Nassariidae, the nassa mud snails or dog whelks.

== Description ==
The size of an adult shell varies between 14 mm and 30 mm.

The smooth shell is ovate, conical, and slightly ventricose. The spire is composed of seven whorls, rounded and swollen at the upper part, especially the lowest, which is larger than all the others united. The three upper whorls are finely plaited. The body whorl has a few fine, transverse striae near the base. The aperture is white and ovate, pretty strongly emarginated, and oblique at the base. The depth of the cavity is chestnut-colored. The thin outer lip is white and very finely striated internally. The inner lip is thin, white and shining and partially covers the body of the shell. The columella arcuated and terminates at the base by a sharp, and slightly projecting keel. The exterior of the shell is red or fawn-colored, ornamented with an articulated band of white and violet upon the upper edge of the whorls, with waved longitudinal yellow or red spots, the tint of which is sometimes very deep, and often very pale.

This shell, which is very common, presents somewhat remarkable varieties of color. Sometimes its ground is red; and white, undulated, very crowded flames, or brown and distant longitudinal lines ornament it from one end to the other. At other times it is whitish, which happens when it has been a long time exposed to the light; and in this case transverse striae are perceptible on its surface. But the articulated band about the suture always appears in each of these varieties.

== Distribution ==
This species occurs in the Mediterranean Sea, the Black Sea, in the Atlantic Ocean off Mauritania and West Africa.
