= Tritia pygmaea =

Scientific classification
- Kingdom: Animalia
- Phylum: Mollusca
- Class: Gastropoda
- Subclass: Caenogastropoda
- Order: Neogastropoda
- Family: Nassariidae
- Genus: Tritia
- Species: †T. pygmaea

Binomial name
- †Tritia pygmaea (Schlotheim, 1820)

Synonyms
- † Hinia pygmaea (Schlotheim, 1820); † Muricites pygmaeus Schlotheim, 1820 (original combination)

Species of gastropod

Tritia pygmaea is an extinct species of sea snail, a marine gastropod mollusc in the family Nassariidae, the nassa mud snails or dog whelks.
