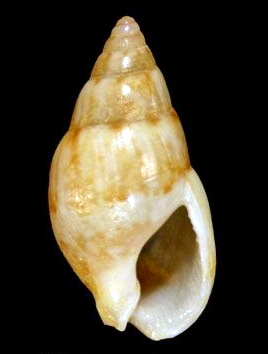
- Shell of Tritia heynemanni (specimen at the Natural History Museum Rotterdam)

Scientific classification
- Kingdom: Animalia
- Phylum: Mollusca
- Class: Gastropoda
- Subclass: Caenogastropoda
- Order: Neogastropoda
- Family: Nassariidae
- Genus: Tritia
- Species: T. heynemanni

Binomial name
- Tritia heynemanni (Von Maltzan, 1884)

Synonyms
- Nassa heynemanni Maltzan, 1884; Nassarius (Nassarius) heynemanni (Von Maltzan, 1884); Nassarius heynemanni (Maltzan, 1884)

= Tritia heynemanni =

Species of gastropod

Tritia heynemanni is a species of sea snail, a marine gastropod mollusk in the family Nassariidae, the Nassa mud snails or dog whelks.

== Description ==
The length of the shell varies between 6 mm and 14 mm.

(original description in latin) The shell is very similar to Tritia corniculum, but it is smaller and features a more obtuse apex. The upper whorls are adorned with dense spiral lines, not radial folds. The base of the shell is striated with much more numerous spiral lines. The outer lip is furnished internally with about 12 folds. It is also similar in stature, but not in sculpture, to the fossil Tritia karreri.

== Distribution ==
This species occurs in the Atlantic Ocean off Southern Spain and Senegal and Mauritania.
