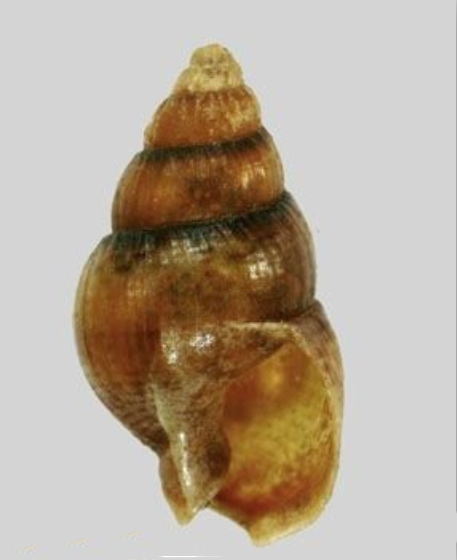
- Shell of Tritia tinei (specimen at the Natural History Museum Rotterdam)

Scientific classification
- Kingdom: Animalia
- Phylum: Mollusca
- Class: Gastropoda
- Subclass: Caenogastropoda
- Order: Neogastropoda
- Family: Nassariidae
- Genus: Tritia
- Species: T. tinei

Binomial name
- Tritia tinei (Maravigna in Guérin, 1840)

Synonyms
- Buccinum gussonii Calcara, 1845; Buccinum tinei Maravigna, 1840 (original combination); Nassarius (Gussonea) tinei (Maravigna, C. in Guérin-Méneville, 1840)

= Tritia tinei =

Species of gastropod

Tritia tinei is a species of sea snail, a marine gastropod mollusc in the family Nassariidae, the nassa mud snails or dog whelks.

This is a taxon inquirendum.

== Description ==
The length of the shell varies between 7 mm and 12 mm. Shell is ovate-conical, tawny coloured, adorned with numerous dark lines on the whole of the spire. The last whorl bears a great number of dark blotches and is transversely striated. the aperture is smooth inside with a bent margin.

== Distribution ==
This species occurs in the Mediterranean Sea off the Strait of Messina.
