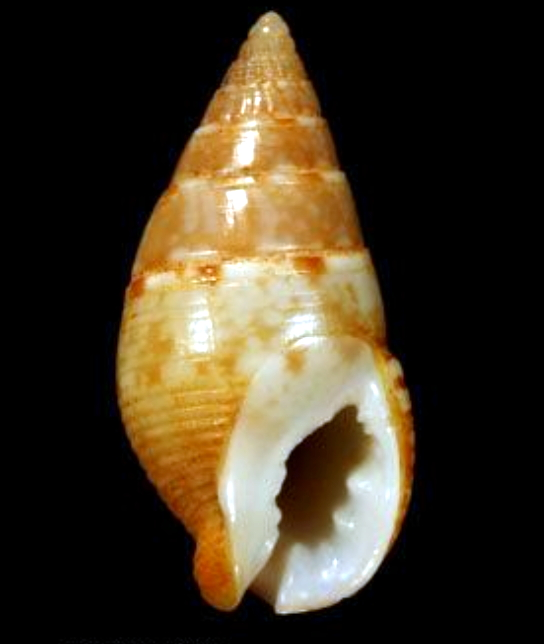
- Shell of Tritia recidiva (specimen at the Natural History Museum Rotterdam)

Scientific classification
- Kingdom: Animalia
- Phylum: Mollusca
- Class: Gastropoda
- Subclass: Caenogastropoda
- Order: Neogastropoda
- Family: Nassariidae
- Genus: Tritia
- Species: T. recidiva

Binomial name
- Tritia recidiva (Martens, 1876)

Synonyms
- Alectrion (Zeuxis) antiquatus (Watson, 1897); Nassa (Telasco) azorica Dautzenberg, 1889; Nassa (Telasco) azorica var. fuscoviolacea Pallary, 1900; Nassa antiquata Watson 1897; Nassa glomus Monterosato 1890; Nassa semistriata var. azorica Dautzenberg 1889; Nassa semistriata var. bulliaeformis Kobelt 1878; Nassa semistriata var. recidiva Martens 1876 (basionym); Nassarius antiquatus (Watson, 1897); Nassarius (Nassarius) macrodon recidivus (Martens, 1876); Nassarius recidivus (Martens, 1876)

= Tritia recidiva =

Species of gastropod

Tritia recidiva is a species of sea snail, a marine gastropod mollusk in the family Nassariidae, the nassa mud snails or dog whelks.

== Description ==
The shell grows to a length of 12 mm. It has a high, slightly cyrtoconoid (almost with the shape of a cone, but having convex sides) spire and a somewhat constricted body whorl. The protoconch consists of three rather large and smooth whorls. The first three teleoconch whorls contain spiral cords and axial folds, which fade out on the next two except for the subsutural spirals.

The body whorl resumes a spiral sculpture of very even, flattened cords much that are broader than the interspaces. The aperture is lanceolate. The outer lip is slightly thickened externally and bears five or six strong rounded denticles inside.

The parietal callus is appressed and devoid of a parietal denticle. It continues into a columellar callus which has a rounded edge, slightly raised over the siphonal canal and bearing a few tubercles. The colour of the shell has a brown hue over a white background. The subsutural and median cords are articulated with darker brown. The aperture is white.

== Distribution ==
T. recidiva occurs in the Western Mediterranean Sea and in the Atlantic Ocean off Madeira.
