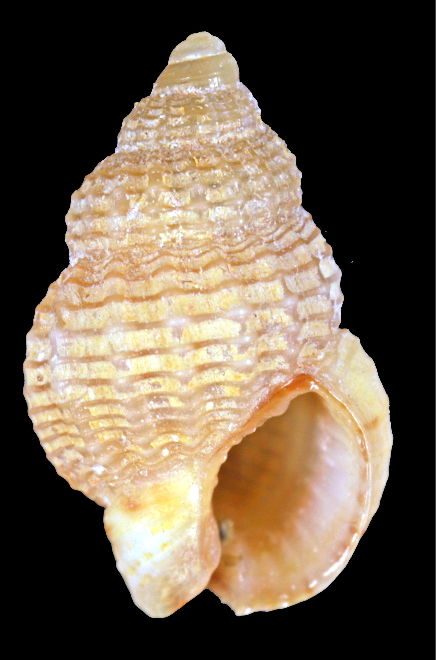
- Shell of Tritia senegalensis (specimen at MNHN, Paris)

Scientific classification
- Kingdom: Animalia
- Phylum: Mollusca
- Class: Gastropoda
- Subclass: Caenogastropoda
- Order: Neogastropoda
- Family: Nassariidae
- Genus: Tritia
- Species: T. senegalensis

Binomial name
- Tritia senegalensis (Maltzan, 1884)

Synonyms
- Nassa incrassata var. senegalensis Maltzan, 1884; Nassa senegalensis Maltzan, 1884; Nassarius senegalensis (Maltzan, 1884)

= Tritia senegalensis =

Species of gastropod

Tritia senegalensis is a species of small sea snail, a marine gastropod mollusc in the family Nassariidae, the dog whelks or nassa mud snails.

== Description ==
The length off the shell varies between 8 mm and 9 mm, its diameter between 5 mm and 5.5 mm.

(Original description in Latin) It differs from the Mediterranean type by a smaller, thinner shell, more convex whorls, a much less expanded aperture callus, and a less thickened outer lip.

== Distribution ==
This species occurs off Senegal.
