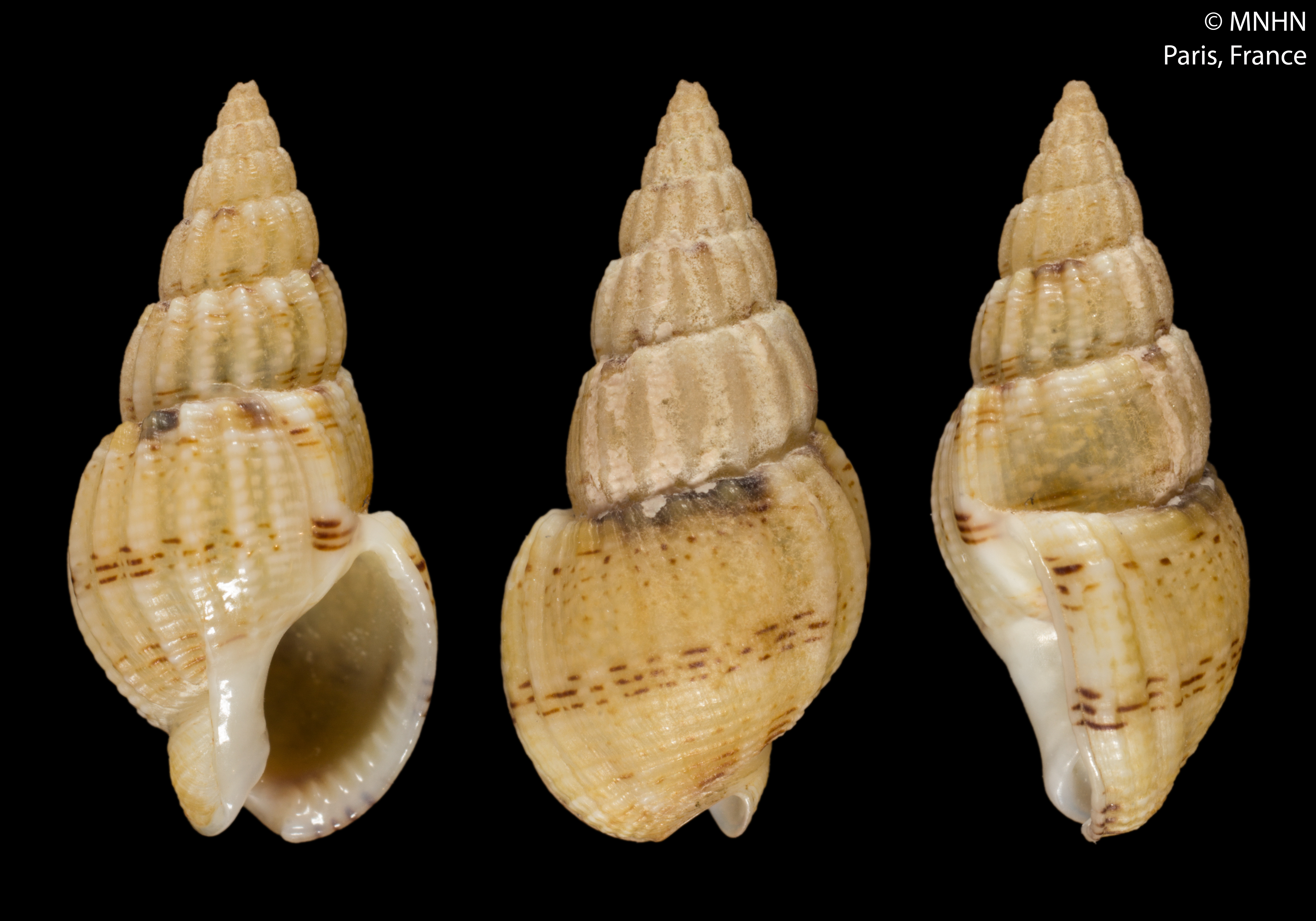
- Shell of Tritia unifasciata (specimen at MNHN, Paris)

Scientific classification
- Kingdom: Animalia
- Phylum: Mollusca
- Class: Gastropoda
- Subclass: Caenogastropoda
- Order: Neogastropoda
- Family: Nassariidae
- Genus: Tritia
- Species: T. unifasciata

Binomial name
- Tritia unifasciata (Kiener, 1834)

Synonyms
- Buccinum unifasciatum Kiener 1834; Nassarius (Telasco) unifasciatus (Kiener, 1834); Nassarius unifasciatus (Kiener, 1834)

= Tritia unifasciata =

Species of gastropod

Tritia unifasciata is a species of sea snail, a marine gastropod mollusk in the family Nassariidae, the Nassa mud snails or dog whelks.

== Description ==
The shell grows to a length of 12 mm.

The ovate, conical shell is elongated and polished. The spire is composed of seven pretty distinct, but slightly convex whorls, ornamented with numerous deeply furrowed folds. The folds of the body whorl are gradually effaced by age, and sometimes completely disappear. These folds are crossed by very fine and very numerous transverse striae, colored with articulated, elongated, brown and whitish spots. The striae of the base are more strongly prominent. The whitish aperture is ovate. The outer lip is thick and denticulated internally. The white columella is arcuated, with a few guttules at its base. The general color is of a yellowish white, or fawn-color, with a brown, decurrent band above the suture, and a single other at the middle of the body whorl like a girdle.

== Distribution ==
This species occurs in the Western Mediterranean Sea.
