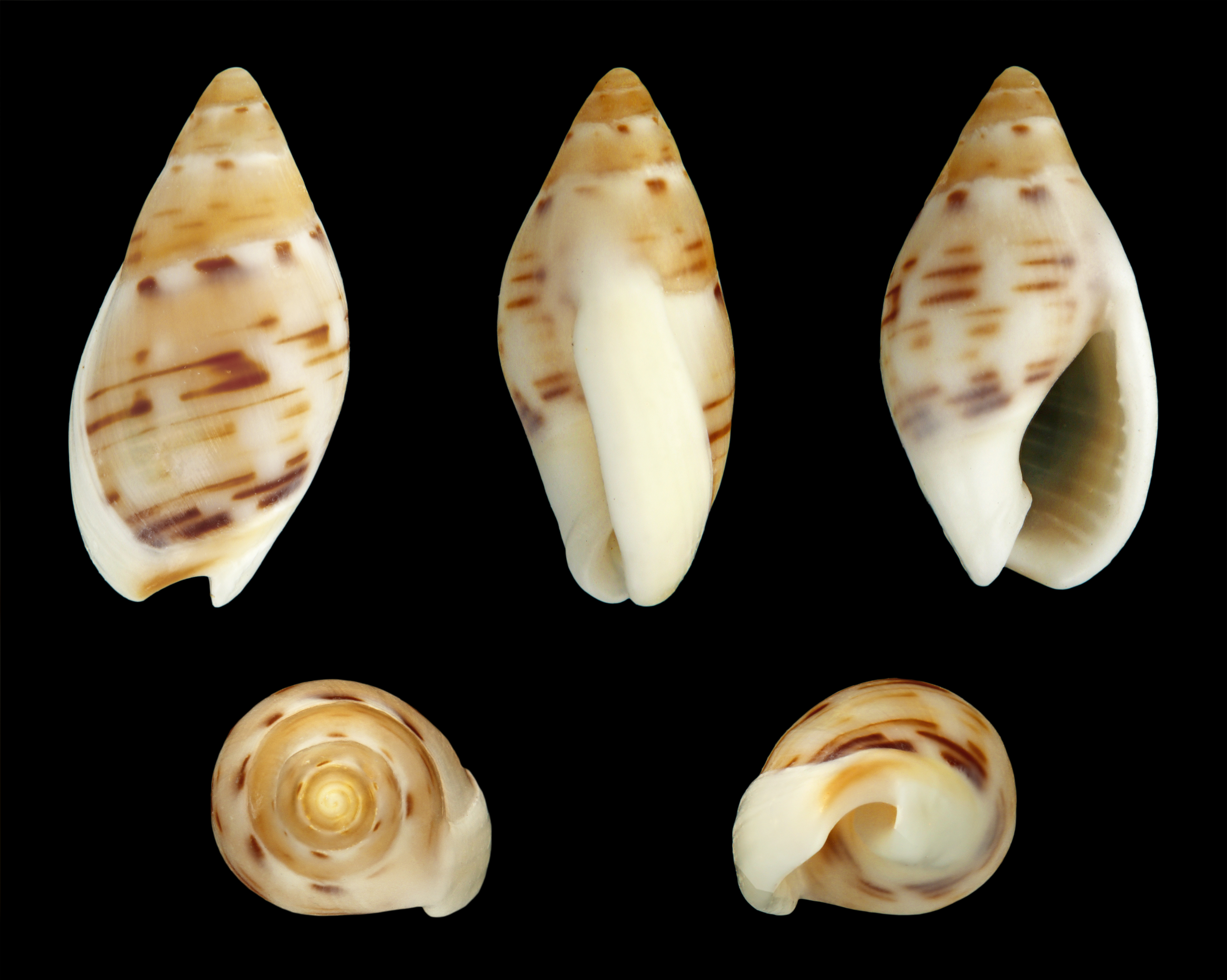

Scientific classification
- Kingdom: Animalia
- Phylum: Mollusca
- Class: Gastropoda
- Subclass: Caenogastropoda
- Order: Neogastropoda
- Family: Nassariidae
- Genus: Tritia
- Species: T. grana

Binomial name
- Tritia grana (Lamarck, 1822)

Synonyms
- Buccinum grana Lamarck, 1822; * Buccinum granum Lamarck, 1822 (basionym): Nassa graniformis Locard, 1886; Nassa granum (Lamarck, 1822); Nassa granum var. elongata Pallary, 1900; Nassa granum var. lutea Pallary, 1920; Nassa granum var. varicosa Pallary, 1900; Nassarius (Naytiopsis) granum (Lamarck, 1822); Nassarius granum (Lamarck, 1822); Naytiopsis granum (Lamarck, 1822); Planaxis laevigata Risso, 1826

= Tritia grana =

Species of mollusc

Tritia grana is a species of sea snail, a marine gastropod mollusk in the family Nassariidae, the Nassa mud snails or dog whelks.

== Spelling ==
The specific name was originally introduced in the binomen Buccinum grana, translated in French as "buccin graine". This has been emended to granum by Kiener (1834: 22) and most subsequent authors, presumably considering that the correct Latin word for "graine" ("seed") is granum. Therefore, the spelling granum must be conserved in application of ICZN art. 33.2.3.1. "when an unjustified emendation is in prevailing usage and is attributed to the original author and date it is deemed to be a justified emendation".

== Description ==
The shell size varies between 10 mm and 14 mm

The small shell is ovate, pretty thick, reddish, smooth and shining. It is surrounded with interrupted, small, brown lines, more approximate towards the middle of the lowest whorl, and of a deeper color at the base. The spire is elongated, pointed. It is composed of seven slightly convex whorls, surrounded at their upper part by a white band, sprinkled with distant, brown points or spots. The aperture is white. The internal edge of the outer lip is crenulated, the external part forming a smooth, thick callus, of a dull white, which is continued upon the base of the shell even to the columella, which is arcuated and folded at its base.

== Distribution ==
This species occurs in the Mediterranean Sea and in the Atlantic Ocean off Senegal.
