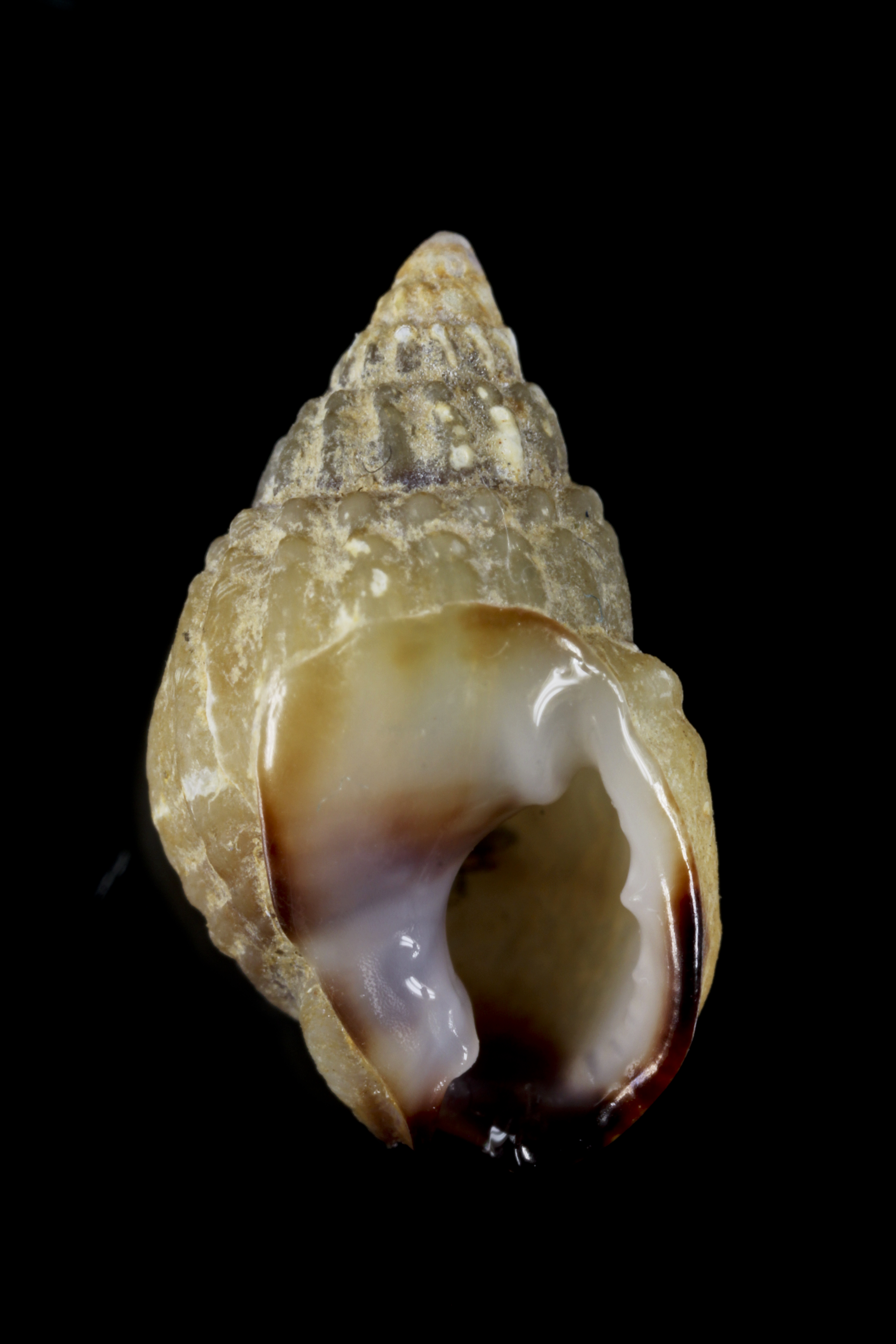
- Shell of Tritia burchardi (specimen at MNHN, Paris)

Scientific classification
- Kingdom: Animalia
- Phylum: Mollusca
- Class: Gastropoda
- Subclass: Caenogastropoda
- Order: Neogastropoda
- Family: Nassariidae
- Genus: Tritia
- Species: T. burchardi

Binomial name
- Tritia burchardi (Dunker in Philippi, 1849)

Synonyms
- Buccinum burchardi Dunker, 1849 (original combination); Nassa (Arcularia) labecula A. Adams, 1852; Nassa (Nassa) labecula A. Adams, 1852 ·; Nassa burchardi (Dunker, 1849); Nassa labecula A. Adams, 1852 (junior synonym); Nassarius (Parcanassa) ellana (Iredale, 1936) junior subjective synonym; Nassarius (Plicarcularia) burchardi (Dunker, 1849); Nassarius burchardi (Dunker, 1849); Nassarius ellana (Iredale, 1936); Parcanassa burchardi (Dunker, 1849); Parcanassa ellana Iredale, 1936 junior subjective synonym

= Tritia burchardi =

Species of gastropod

Tritia burchardi is a species of sea snail, a marine gastropod mollusk in the family Nassariidae, the Nassa mud snails or dog whelks.

== Description ==
The length of the shell varies between 10 mm and 15 mm.

(Original description in Latin of Nassa labecula) The shell is ovate-conical and oblique. The spire is somewhat acuminate and pale brown, and the body whorl is encircled by an obsolete brown band. The uppermost whorls are flattened and ribbed, while the body whorl is ribbed above and flat below. The callus of the lip is expanded and thin, adorned with a shining brownish spot. The outer lip is thickened posteriorly and toothed internally.

== Distribution ==
This species occurs off Australia (New South Wales, Queensland, South Australia, Tasmania, Victoria, Western Australia) and northern New Zealand.
