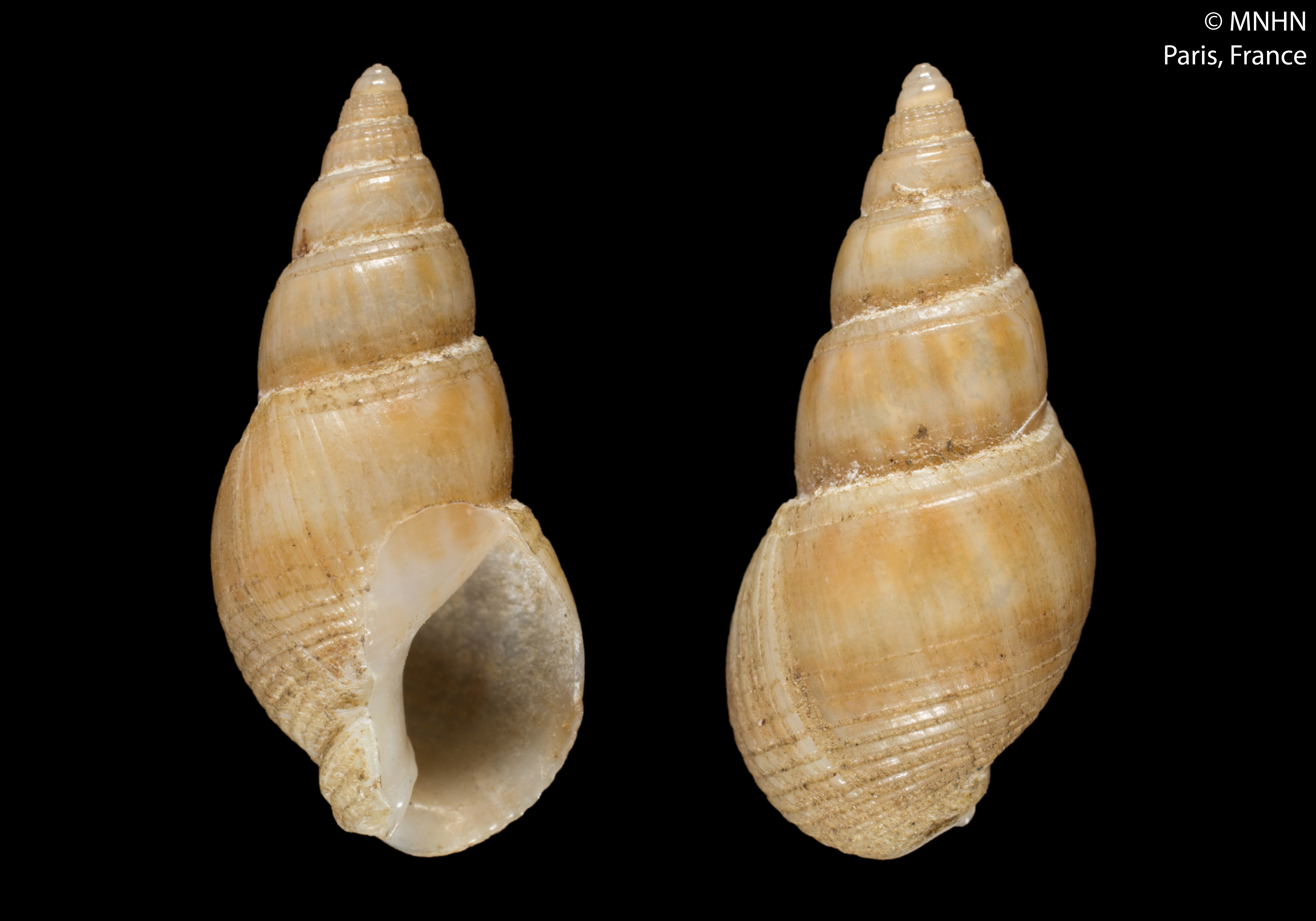
- Shell of Tritia elata (syntype at MNHN, Paris)

Scientific classification
- Kingdom: Animalia
- Phylum: Mollusca
- Class: Gastropoda
- Subclass: Caenogastropoda
- Order: Neogastropoda
- Family: Nassariidae
- Subfamily: Nassariinae
- Genus: Tritia
- Species: T. elata

Binomial name
- Tritia elata (Gould, 1845)

Synonyms
- Columbella buchholzi Martens, 1881; Nassa (Telasco) interstincta Marrat, 1878; †Nassa catalaunica Almera & Bofill, 1898; †Nassa cossmanni Depontallier, 1878; Nassa elata Gould, 1845; Nassa gallandiana Fischer, 1862; Nassa gallandiana var. albida Locard, 1887; Nassa gallandiana var. monochroma Locard, 1887; Nassa interstincta Marrat, 1878; †Nassa neglecta Bellardi, 1882; †Nassa pinnata Bellardi, 1882; †Nassa transitans Bellardi, 1882; Nassarius elatus (Gould, 1845)

= Tritia elata =

Species of gastropod

Tritia elata is a species of sea snail, a marine gastropod mollusc in the family Nassariidae, the Nassa mud snails or dog whelks.

== Description ==
The shell size varies between 10 mm and 20 mm.

(Original description) This dingy-white shell has a slender, elongated form giving it somewhat the aspect of a Terebra. It is remarkable for its varied sculpture.

There are 8 flattened, turreted whorls, featuring a marginal line near the suture. The six upper whorls are marked with regular, somewhat distant, acute folds. The last but one, and the upper half of the body whorl, are smooth. The lower half is occupied by about half a dozen regular, deeply impressed, revolving striae.

The aperture is small and narrow, measuring less than half the length of the shell. The outer lip is sharp, somewhat sinuate near the front, and is rendered serrate where the revolving striae cut it. It appears striate and white within. The callus on the columella is rather sparing.

== Distribution ==
This species occurs in European waters off Portugal and in the Atlantic Ocean off Angola.
