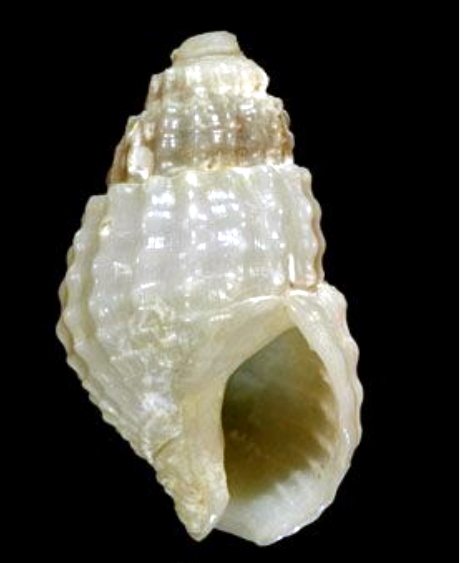
- Shell of Tritia frigens (specimen at the Natural History Museum Rotterdam)

Scientific classification
- Kingdom: Animalia
- Phylum: Mollusca
- Class: Gastropoda
- Subclass: Caenogastropoda
- Order: Neogastropoda
- Family: Nassariidae
- Genus: Tritia
- Species: T. frigens

Binomial name
- Tritia frigens (Martens, 1878)

Synonyms
- Hinia frigens (Martens, 1878); Hinia frigens malacitanae Quiles, 1973; Nassa (Tritia) brychia Watson, 1882; Nassa brychia Watson, 1882; Nassa brychia var. decorata Locard, 1897; Nassa brychia var. major Locard, 1897 (synonym); Nassa brychia var. minor Locard, 1897; Nassa frigens Martens, 1878; Nassarius brychius (Watson, 1882); Nassarius (Nassarius) frigens (Martens, E.C. von, 1878)

= Tritia frigens =

Species of gastropod

Tritia frigens is a species of sea snail, a marine gastropod mollusk in the family Nassariidae, the Nassa mud snails or dog whelks.

== Description ==
The shell grows to a length of 15 mm, its diameter 6 mm.

(Original description in Latin) The shell is ovate, sculptured with smooth, subvertical ribs that are doubly distant in their interspaces and appear nodulosely-abrupt upwards. It also features impressed lines, which are sparse above and more frequent below. A broader, opaque, whitish infrasutural lira is present.

The shell comprises 5-6 whorls, divided by a subcanaliculate suture. The aperture is ovate and slightly oblique, featuring a simple, unarmed white peristome. The inner margin is expanded into a narrow, subelliptic callus superiorly.

== Distribution ==
This species occurs in European waters and in the Atlantic Ocean off Morocco and Mauritania.
