= Nassarius festivus =

Scientific classification
- Kingdom: Animalia
- Phylum: Mollusca
- Class: Gastropoda
- Subclass: Caenogastropoda
- Order: Neogastropoda
- Family: Nassariidae
- Subfamily: Nassariinae
- Genus: Nassarius
- Species: N. festiva

Binomial name
- Nassarius festiva (Powys, 1835)

Synonyms
- Hinia festiva (Powys, 1835); † Nassa (Hebra) bonneti Cossmann, 1901; † Nassa (Hebra) bonneti var. kachhensis Vredenburg, 1925; Nassa (Hebra) bouneti Cossmann, 1901; Nassa (Hima) festiva (Powys, 1835); Nassa festiva Powys, 1835 (original combination); Nassa lirata Dunker, 1860 (junior synonym); Nassa nodata Hinds, 1844; Nassarius (Hinia) festivus (Powys, 1835); † Nassarius (Hinia) prefestivus MacNeil, 1960; Nassarius (Niotha) festivus (Powys, 1835); Reticunassa festiva (Powys, 1835); Tritia (Hinia) festivus (Powys, 1835); Tritia festiva (Powys, 1835)

Species of gastropod

Nassarius festivus is a species of sea snail, a marine gastropod mollusk in the family Nassariidae.

== Description ==
The length of the shell attains 13 mm.

== Distribution ==
This marine species occurs off China and Japan.
