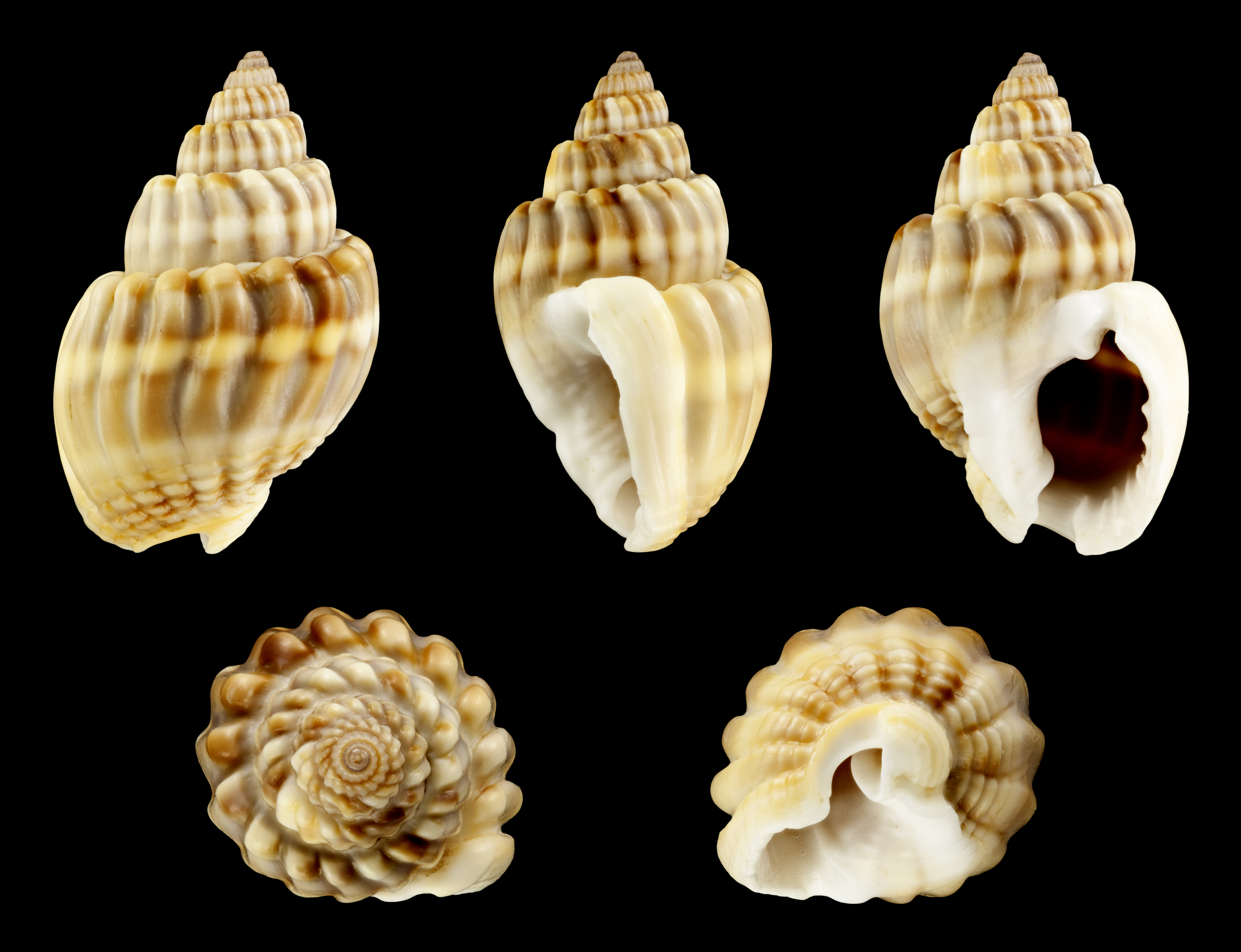

Scientific classification
- Kingdom: Animalia
- Phylum: Mollusca
- Class: Gastropoda
- Subclass: Caenogastropoda
- Order: Neogastropoda
- Family: Nassariidae
- Genus: Nassarius
- Species: N. castus

Binomial name
- Nassarius castus (Gould, 1835)

Synonyms
- Arcularia caelata (A. Adams, 1852); Buccinum rufum Dunker, 1847; † Nassa (Alectryon) caelata A. Adams, 1852; † Nassa (Hinia) verbeeki K. Martin, 1895; † Nassa (Hinia) verbeeki fekuensis Koperberg, 1931; † Nassa (Hinia) verbeeki fischeri Koperberg, 1931; Nassa (Hinia) vitiensis Hombron & Jacquinot, 1946; † Nassa (Telasco) verbeeki K. Martin, 1895; Nassa (Zeuxis) levukensis Watson, 1882; Nassa caelata A. Adams, 1852; Nassa casta Gould, 1850; Nassa costata A. Adams, 1852; Nassa elongata Marrat, 1874; Nassa incognita Thiele, 1925; Nassa lactea Marrat, 1880; Nassa maldivensis E.A. Smith, 1903; Nassa mukulensis E.A. Smith, 1903; Nassa oriens Marrat, 1880; Nassa sinensis Marrat, 1877; Nassa thaumasia Sturany, 1900; Nassa vitiensis Rousseau, 1854; Nassarius (Hinia) caelatus (A. Adams, 1852); Nassarius (Hinia) caelatus danitensis Makiyama, 1927; Nassarius (Zeuxis) caelatus (A. Adams, 1852); † Nassarius (Zeuxis) caelatus verbeeki (K. Martin, 1895); Nassarius (Zeuxis) castus (Gould, 1850); Nassarius (Zeuxis) kiiensis Kira, 1954; Nassarius (Zeuxis) kiiensis Kira, 1959; † Nassarius (Zeuxis) minoensis Itoigawa, 1960; † Nassarius (Zeuxis) miyazakiensis Shuto, 1962; Nassarius (Zeuxis) vitiensis (Hombron & Jaquinot, 1946); Nassarius caelatus (A. Adams, 1852); Nassarius thaumasius (Sturany, 1900); Niotha caelata A. Adams, 1870; Zeuxis caelatus (A. Adams, 1852); Zeuxis kiiensis Kira, 1954

= Nassarius castus =

Species of gastropod

Nassarius castus is a species of sea snail, a marine gastropod mollusc in the family Nassariidae, the Nassa mud snails or dog whelks.

== Description ==
The length of the shell varies between 17 mm and 41 mm.

== Distribution ==
This species occurs in the Red Sea, in the Indian Ocean off the Mascarene Basin and La Réunion; in the Indo-West Pacific.
