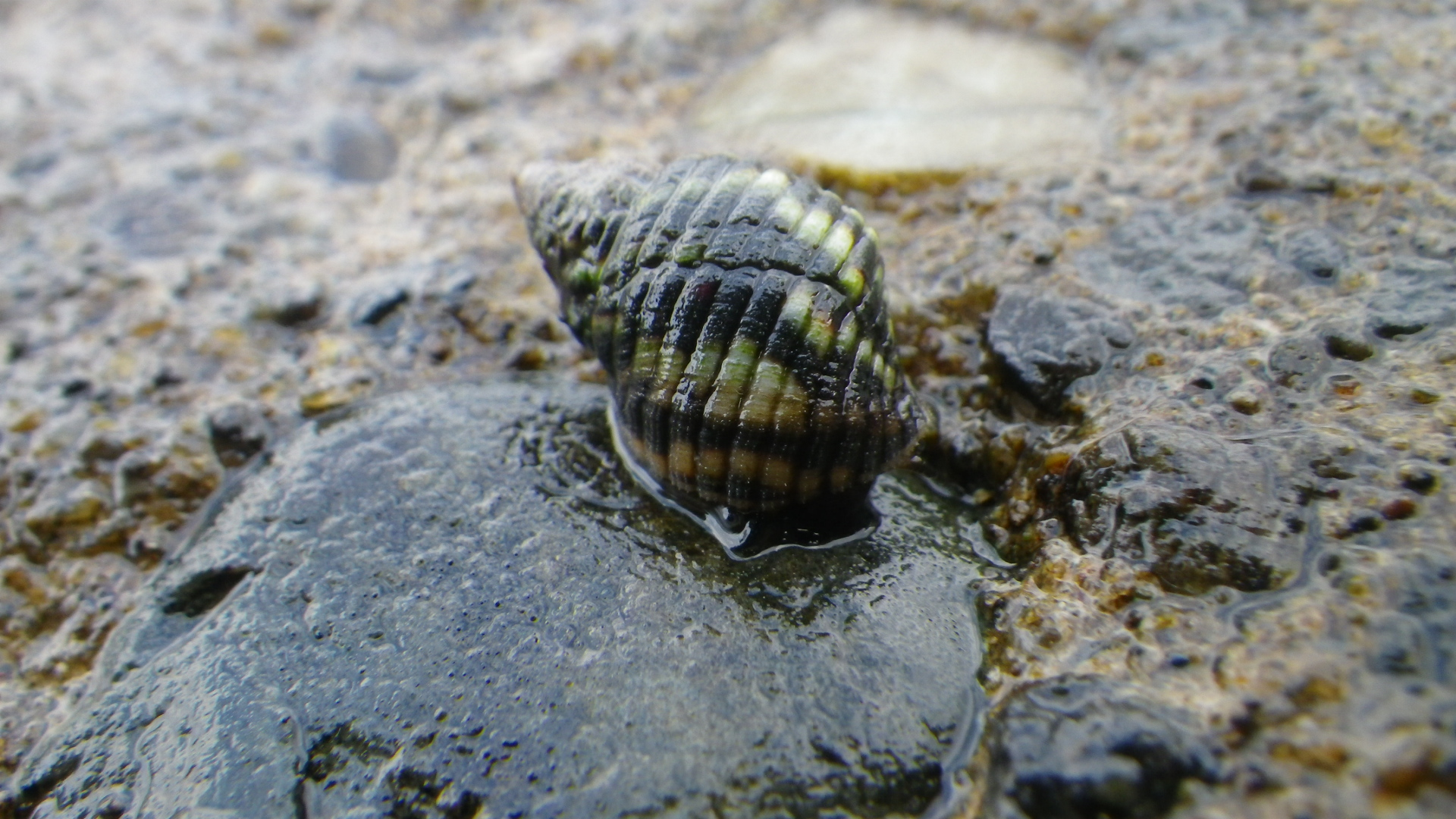
- Planaxis sulcatus

Scientific classification
- Kingdom: Animalia
- Phylum: Mollusca
- Class: Gastropoda
- Subclass: Caenogastropoda
- Order: incertae sedis
- Superfamily: Cerithioidea
- Family: Planaxidae
- Genus: Planaxis; Lamarck, 1822

Type species
- Buccinum sulcatum Born, 1778

= Planaxis =

Genus of gastropods

Planaxis is a genus of small sea snails, marine gastropod molluscs in the family Planaxidae.

== Species ==
Species within the genus Planaxis include:

- Planaxis savignyi Deshayes, 1844
- Planaxis sulcatus (Born, 1791)
- Planaxis suturalis E.A. Smith, 1872
- Planaxis virgatus E. A. Smith, 1872

Species brought into synonymy

- Planaxis (Supplanaxis) Thiele, 1929: synonym of Supplanaxis Thiele, 1929
- Planaxis abbreviata Pease, 1865: synonym of Planaxis niger Quoy & Gaimard, 1833
- Planaxis acuta Krauss, 1848: synonym of Supplanaxis acutus (Krauss, 1848)
- Planaxis acutus Krauss, 1848: synonym of Supplanaxis acutus (Krauss, 1848)
- Planaxis affinis Risso, 1826: synonym of Nassarius incrassatus (Strøm, 1768): synonym of Tritia incrassata (Strøm, 1768)
- Planaxis akuana Rehder, 1980: synonym of Hinea akuana (Rehder, 1980)
- Planaxis albersii Dunker, 1853: synonym of Planaxis atropurpurea Récluz, 1843
- Planaxis areolatus Lesson, 1842: synonym of Nassarius concinnus (Powys, 1835)
- Planaxis atra Pease, 1869: synonym of Planaxis niger Quoy & Gaimard, 1833
- † Planaxis aulacophorus Cossmann, 1889: synonym of † Hinea fischeri (de Raincourt, 1884)
- † Planaxis beaumonti Bayan, 1870: synonym of † Supplanaxis beaumonti (Bayan, 1870) (original combination)
- Planaxis beudantiana Risso, 1826: synonym of Nassarius cuvierii (Payraudeau, 1826): synonym of Tritia cuvierii (Payraudeau, 1826)
- Planaxis brevis Quoy & Gaimard, 1833: synonym of Planaxis sulcatus (Born, 1778)
- Planaxis buccinea A. Adams, 1853: synonym of Planaxis buccineus A. Adams, 1853 (nomen dubium) (incorrect grammatical agreement of specific epithet)
- Planaxis buccinoides Deshayes, 1828: synonym of Planaxis sulcatus (Born, 1778)
- Planaxis canaliculata Duval, 1840: synonym of Planaxis canaliculatus Duval, 1840: synonym of Planaxis planicostatus G. B. Sowerby I, 1825: synonym of Supplanaxis planicostatus (G. B. Sowerby I, 1825) (incorrect gender agreement of specific epithet)
- Planaxis canaliculatus Duval, 1840: synonym of Planaxis planicostatus G. B. Sowerby I, 1825: synonym of Supplanaxis planicostatus (G. B. Sowerby I, 1825)
- Planaxis cingulata Gould, 1861: synonym of Cronia avenacea|Cronia (Usilla) avenacea (Lesson, 1842): synonym of Usilla avenacea (Lesson, 1842) (junior homonym of Planaxis cingulata A. Adams, 1853; Planaxis gouldii E. A. Smith, 1872 is a replacement name.)
- Planaxis circinatus Lesson, 1842: synonym of Planaxis planicostatus G. B. Sowerby I, 1825: synonym of Supplanaxis planicostatus ' (G. B. Sowerby I, 1825)
- †Planaxis dautzenbergi Glibert, 1949: synonym of † Stosicia planaxoides (Grateloup, 1838): synonym of † Stosicia buccinalis (Grateloup, 1828)
- Planaxis decollata Quoy & Gaimard, 1833: synonym of Fissilabia decollata (Quoy & Gaimard, 1833)
- Planaxis desmarestiana Risso, 1826: synonym of Nassarius incrassatus (Strøm, 1768)
- Planaxis discrepans Risso, 1826: synonym of Nassarius corniculum (Olivi, 1792)
- Planaxis donatiana Risso, 1826: synonym of Nassarius cuvierii (Payraudeau, 1826): synonym of Tritia cuvierii (Payraudeau, 1826)
- Planaxis eboreus E. A. Smith, 1872: synonym of Angiola lineata (da Costa, 1778): synonym of Hinea lineata (da Costa, 1778)
- Planaxis fasciata Pease, 1868: synonym of Angiola punctostriata (E. A. Smith, 1872)
- Planaxis fasciatus Pease, 1868: synonym of Angiola fasciata (Pease, 1868)
- † Planaxis fischeri de Raincourt, 1884: synonym of † Hinea fischeri (de Raincourt, 1884) (original combination)
- Planaxis fitcheliana Risso, 1826: synonym of Nassarius cuvierii (Payraudeau, 1826): synonym of Tritia cuvierii (Payraudeau, 1826)
- Planaxis gouldii Smith, 1872: synonym of Cronia (Usilla) avenacea (Lesson, 1842)
- Planaxis griseus Brocchi, 1821: synonym of Planaxis savignyi Deshayes, 1844
- Planaxis hanleyi E. A. Smith, 1872: synonym of Supplanaxis niger (Quoy & Gaimard, 1833)
- Planaxis inepta Gould, 1861: synonym of Hinea inepta (Gould, 1861) (original combination)
- Planaxis labiosa A. Adams, 1853: synonym of Angiola labiosa (A. Adams, 1853): synonym of Hinea zonata (A. Adams, 1853)
- Planaxis laevigata Risso, 1826: synonym of Nassarius granum (Lamarck, 1822)
- Planaxis lineatus (da Costa, 1778): synonym of Angiola fasciata (da Costa, 1778)
- Planaxis lineolata Risso, 1826: synonym of Nassarius cuvierii (Payraudeau, 1826)
- Planaxis lineolata Gould, 1849: synonym of Angiola punctostriata (E. A. Smith, 1872)
- Planaxis lineolatus Gould, 1849: synonym of Angiola punctostriata (E. A. Smith, 1872)
- Planaxis longispira E.A. Smith, 1872: synonym of Angiola longispira (E.A. Smith, 1872): synonym of Hinea longispira (E. A. Smith, 1872) (original combination)
- Planaxis loques Risso, 1826: synonym of Nassarius cuvierii (Payraudeau, 1826): synonym of Tritia cuvierii (Payraudeau, 1826)
- Planaxis mamillata Risso, 1826: synonym of Nassarius nitidus (Jeffreys, 1867): synonym of Tritia nitida (Jeffreys, 1867) (dubious synonym)
- Planaxis menkeanus Dunker, 1862: synonym of Planaxis sulcatus (Born, 1778)
- Planaxis molliana Risso, 1826: synonym of Nassarius cuvierii (Payraudeau, 1826): synonym of Tritia cuvierii (Payraudeau, 1826)
- Planaxis mollis G. B. Sowerby I, 1823: synonym of Hinea brasiliana (Lamarck, 1822)
- Planaxis nancyae Petuch, 2013: synonym of Supplanaxis nancyae (Petuch, 2013) (original combination)
- Planaxis nicobaricus Frauenfeld, 1866: synonym of Planaxis niger Quoy & Gaimard, 1833
- Planaxis niger Quoy & Gaimard, 1833: synonym of Supplanaxis niger (Quoy & Gaimard, 1833)
- Planaxis nigra [sic] : synonym of Planaxis niger Quoy & Gaimard, 1833
- Planaxis nigritella Forbes, 1852: synonym of Planaxis obsoletus Menke, 1851
- Planaxis nucleola Mörch, 1876: synonym of Supplanaxis nucleus (Bruguière, 1789)
- Planaxis nucleus (Bruguière, 1789): synonym of Supplanaxis nucleus (Bruguière, 1789)
- Planaxis obscura A. Adams, 1853: synonym of Planaxis sulcatus (Born, 1778)
- Planaxis obsoletus Menke, 1851: synonym of Supplanaxis obsoletus (Menke, 1851) (original combination)
- Planaxis olivacea Risso, 1826: synonym of Nassarius corniculum (Olivi, 1792): synonym of Tritia corniculum (Olivi, 1792)
- Planaxis pigra Forbes, 1852: synonym of Hinea brasiliana (Lamarck, 1822)
- Planaxis piliger Philippi, 1849: synonym of Holcostoma piliger (Philippi, 1849)
- Planaxis planicostatus G.B. Sowerby, 1825: synonym of Supplanaxis planicostatus (G. B. Sowerby I, 1825) (original combination)
- Planaxis punctorostratus: synonym of Angiola punctostriata] (E. A. Smith, 1872): synonym of Hinea punctostriata (E. A. Smith, 1872)
- Planaxis punctostriata Smith, 1872: synonym of Angiola punctostriata (Smith E.A., 1872): synonym of Hinea punctostriata (E. A. Smith, 1872)
- Planaxis raricosta Risso, 1826: synonym of Nassarius corniculum (Olivi, 1792): synonym of Tritia corniculum (Olivi, 1792)
- Planaxis riparia Risso, 1826: synonym of Nassarius cuvierii (Payraudeau, 1826): synonym of Tritia cuvierii (Payraudeau, 1826)
- Planaxis rosacea Risso, 1826: synonym of Nassarius incrassatus (Strøm, 1768): synonym of Tritia incrassata (Strøm, 1768)
- Planaxis semisulcatus G. B. Sowerby I, 1823: synonym of Supplanaxis nucleus (Bruguière, 1789)
- Planaxis similis E. A. Smith, 1872: synonym of Planaxis niger Quoy & Gaimard, 1833
- Planaxis striatulus Philippi, 1851: synonym of Hinea zonata (A. Adams, 1853)
- Planaxis tenuis Risso, 1826: synonym of Nassarius cuvierii (Payraudeau, 1826): synonym of Tritia cuvierii (Payraudeau, 1826)
- Planaxis trifasciata Risso, 1826: synonym of Nassarius corniculum (Olivi, 1792): synonym of Tritia corniculum (Olivi, 1792)
- Planaxis turulosa Risso, 1826: synonym of Nassarius turulosus (Risso, 1826): synonym of Tritia turulosa (Risso, 1826) (original combination)
- Planaxis undulata Lamarck, 1822: synonym of Planaxis sulcatus (Born, 1778)
- Planaxis zonatus A. Adams, 1853: synonym of Hinea zonata (A. Adams, 1853) (original combination)
