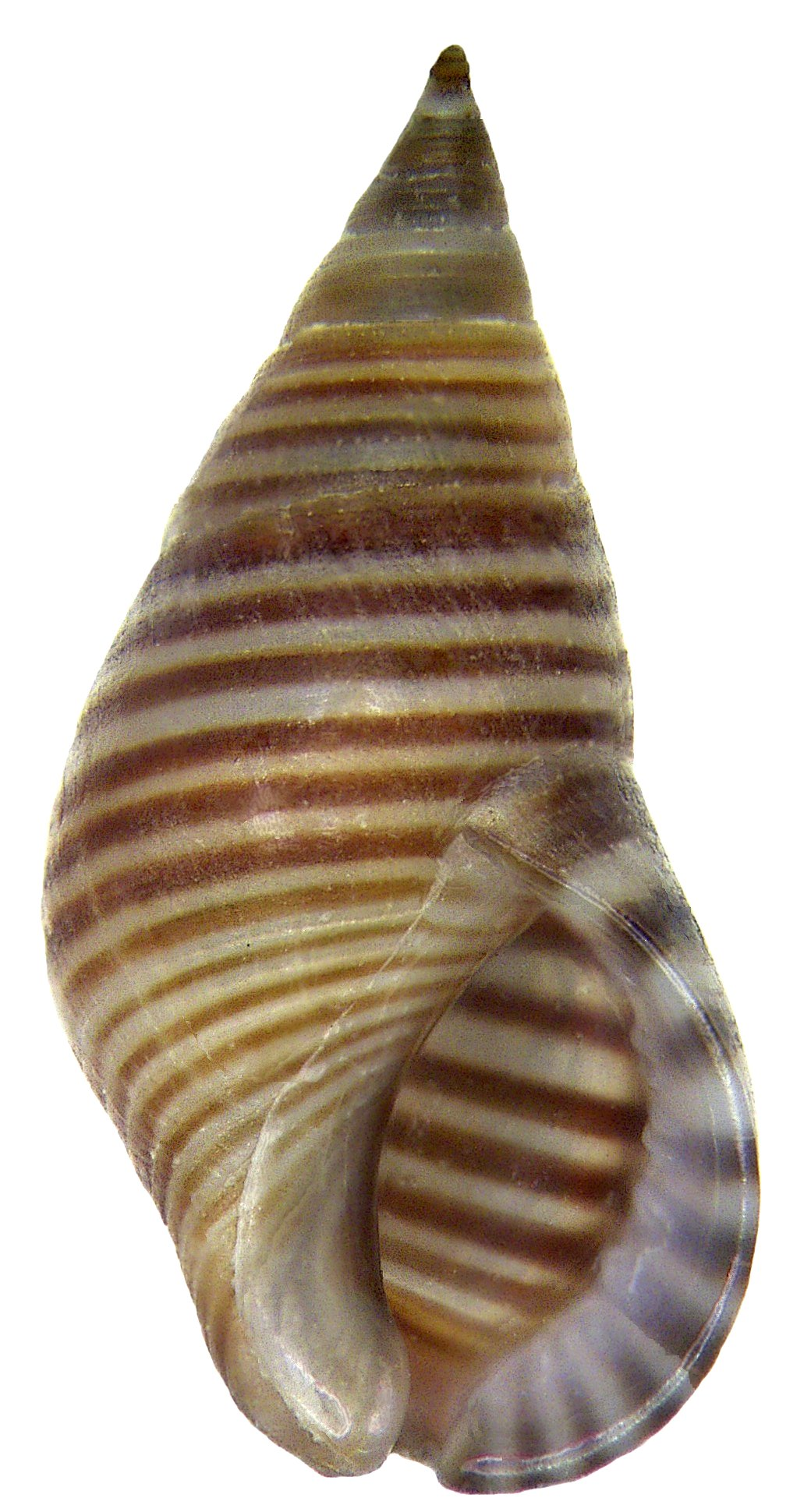
- Angiola fasciata shell

Scientific classification
- Kingdom: Animalia
- Phylum: Mollusca
- Class: Gastropoda
- Subclass: Caenogastropoda
- Order: incertae sedis
- Family: Planaxidae
- Subfamily: Planaxinae
- Genus: Angiola; Dall, 1926

Type species
- Angiola periscelida Dall, 1926 accepted as Hinea longispira (E. A. Smith, 1872)

= Angiola =

Genus of gastropods

Angiola is a genus of sea snails, marine gastropod mollusks in the family Planaxidae.

This genus has become a synonym of Hinea Gray, 1847.

== Species ==
Species within the genus Angiola include:

- Angiola fasciata (Pease, 1868): synonym of Hinea fasciata (Pease, 1868)
- Angiola labiosa (A. Adams, 1853): synonym of Hinea zonata (A. Adams, 1853)
- Angiola lineata (Da Costa, 1778): synonym of Hinea lineata (da Costa, 1778)
- Angiola longispira (E.A. Smith, 1872): synonym of Hinea longispira (E. A. Smith, 1872)
- Angiola periscelida Dall, 1926: : synonym of Hinea longispira (E. A. Smith, 1872)
- Angiola punctostriata (Smith E.A., 1872): synonym of Hinea punctostriata (E. A. Smith, 1872)
- Angiola zonata (A. Adams, 1853): synonym of Hinea zonata (A. Adams, 1853)
