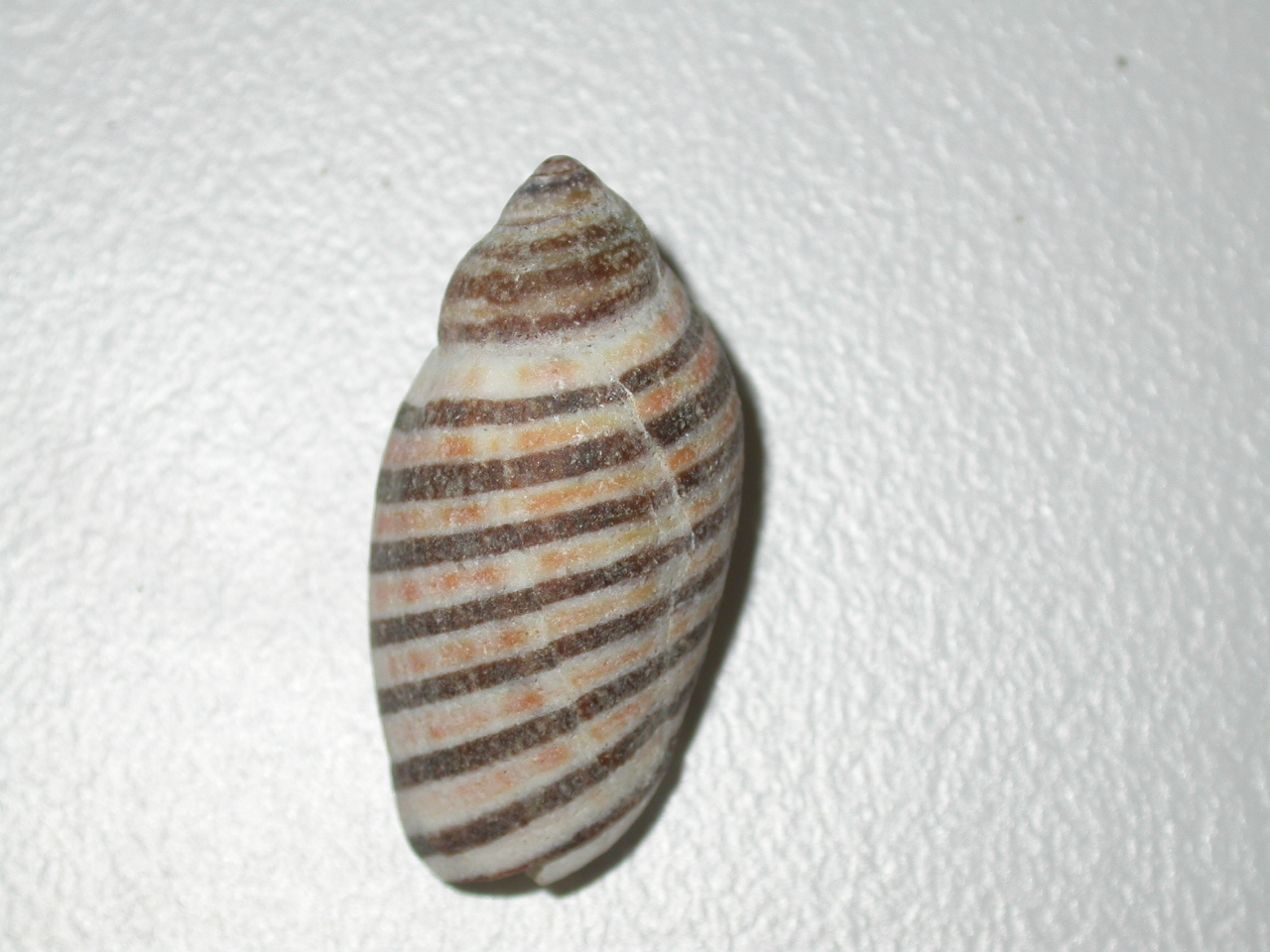
- Vexilla vexillum

Scientific classification
- Kingdom: Animalia
- Phylum: Mollusca
- Class: Gastropoda
- Subclass: Caenogastropoda
- Order: Neogastropoda
- Superfamily: Muricoidea
- Family: Muricidae
- Subfamily: Rapaninae
- Genus: Vexilla; Swainson, 1840

Type species
- Vexilla picta Swainson, 1840

Synonyms
- Provexillum Hedley, 1918

= Vexilla (gastropod) =

Genus of gastropods

Vexilla is a genus of sea snails, marine gastropod mollusks in the family Muricidae, the murex snails or rock snails.

== Description ==
The shell is purpuriform. The inner lip is flattened and depressed. The outer lip, when adult, is thickened, inflected, and toothed. The aperture is wide.

== Species ==
Species within the genus Vexilla include:

- Vexilla taeniata (Powis, 1835)
- Vexilla vexillum (Gmelin, 1791)

Synonyms

- Vexilla (Usilla) H. Adams, 1861: synonym of Usilla H. Adams, 1861 (original rank)
- Vexilla fusconigra Pease, 1860: synonym of Usilla avenacea (Lesson, 1842)
- Vexilla lineata A. Adams, 1854: synonym of Vexilla vexillum (Gmelin, 1791)
- Vexilla picta Swainson, 1840: synonym of Vexilla vexillum (Gmelin, 1791)
- Vexilla thaanumi Pilsbry, 1921: synonym of Vexilla vexillum (Gmelin, 1791) (original combination)
- Vexilla variabilis (Deshayes, 1863): synonym of Cronia avenacea (Lesson, 1842): synonym of Usilla avenacea (Lesson, 1842)
