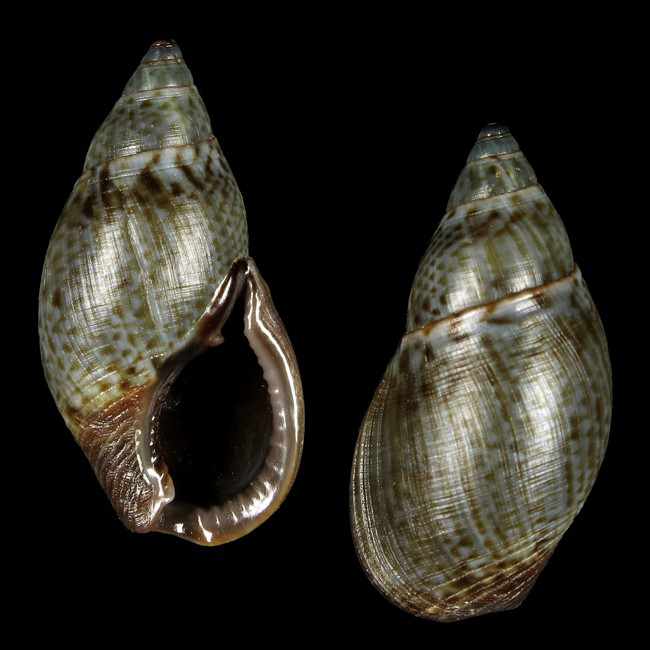
- Shell of Supplanaxis leyteensis (holotype at MNHN, Paris)

Scientific classification
- Kingdom: Animalia
- Phylum: Mollusca
- Class: Gastropoda
- Subclass: Caenogastropoda
- Order: incertae sedis
- Family: Planaxidae
- Genus: Supplanaxis
- Species: S. leyteensis

Binomial name
- Supplanaxis leyteensis Poppe, Tagaro & Stahlschmidt, 2015

= Supplanaxis leyteensis =

Species of gastropod

Supplanaxis leyteensis is a species of sea snail, a marine gastropod mollusk in the family Planaxidae.

== Description ==
The length of the shell attains 19 mm.

== Distribution ==
This marine species occurs off the Philippines.
