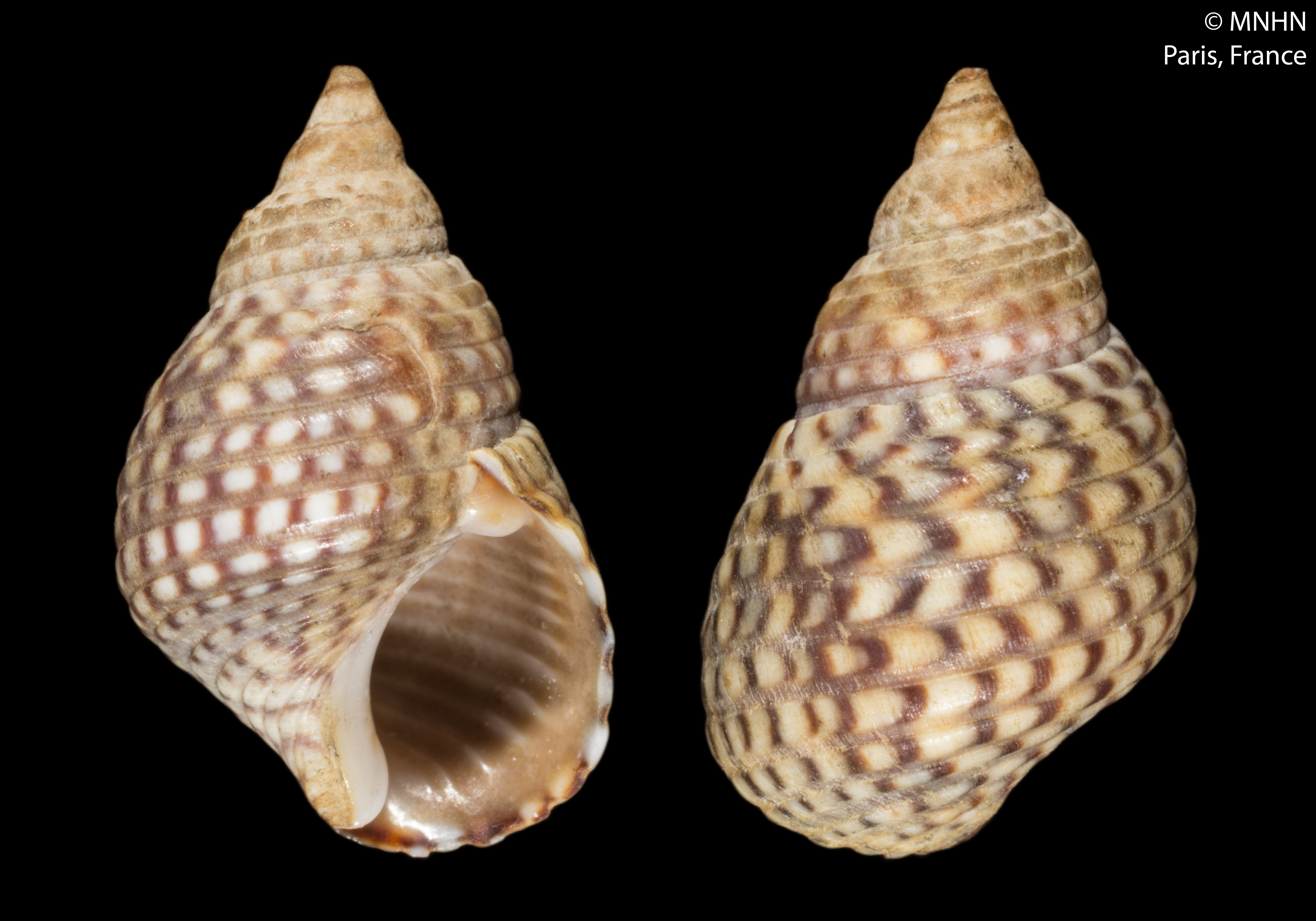
- Shell of Planaxis savignyi (syntype at MNHN, Paris)

Scientific classification
- Kingdom: Animalia
- Phylum: Mollusca
- Class: Gastropoda
- Subclass: Caenogastropoda
- Order: incertae sedis
- Family: Planaxidae
- Genus: Planaxis
- Species: P. savignyi

Binomial name
- Planaxis savignyi Deshayes, 1844

Synonyms
- Buccinum griseum Brocchi, 1821 (invalid: junior homonym of Buccinum griseum Schröter, 1805); Planaxis griseus Brocchi, 1821; Tricolia draparnaudi Audouin, 1826

= Planaxis savignyi =

Species of gastropod

Planaxis savignyi is a species of sea snail, a marine gastropod mollusc in the family Planaxidae.

== Description ==
The length of the shell attains 17 mm.

== Distribution ==
This species occurs in the Red Sea.
