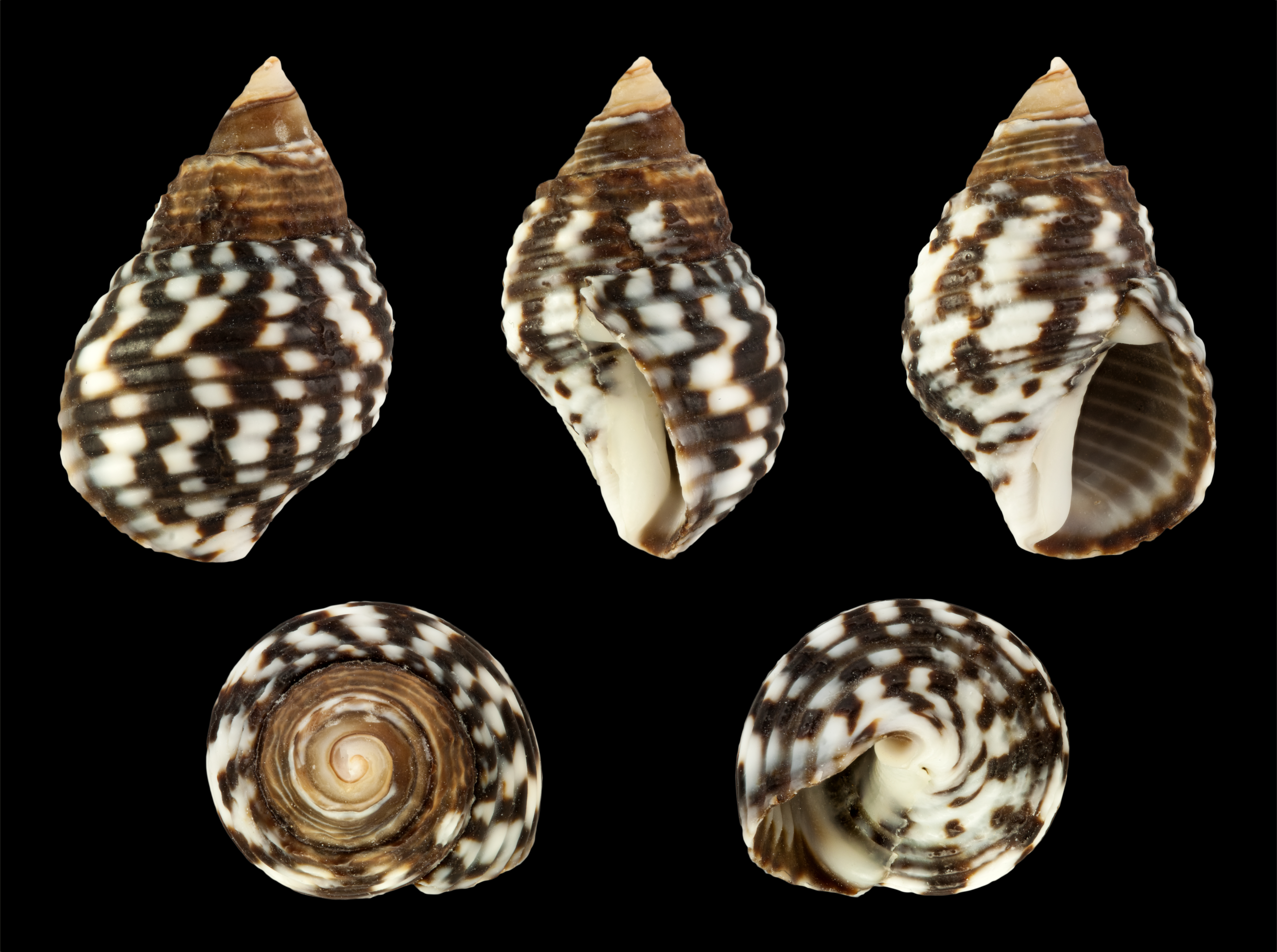
- Planaxis sulcatus shells

Scientific classification
- Kingdom: Animalia
- Phylum: Mollusca
- Class: Gastropoda
- Subclass: Caenogastropoda
- Order: incertae sedis
- Family: Planaxidae
- Genus: Planaxis
- Species: P. sulcatus

Binomial name
- Planaxis sulcatus (Born, 1791)

Synonyms
- Buccinum pyramidale Gmelin, 1791; Buccinum sulcatum Born, 1778 (original combination); Planaxis brevis Quoy & Gaimard, 1833; Planaxis buccinoides Deshayes, 1828; Planaxis menkeanus Dunker, 1862; Planaxis obscura A. Adams, 1853; Planaxis undulata Lamarck, 1822

= Planaxis sulcatus =

Species of gastropod

Planaxis sulcatus, common name the tropical periwinkle, is a species of sea snail, a marine gastropod mollusc in the family Planaxidae.

== Distribution ==
This marine species occurs in the Red Sea and in the Indian Ocean off Mozambique, Kenya, Madagascar, Tanzania and off Mauritius, Chagos, Aldabra and the Mascarene Basin. It is also found off the Pakistani coast, specially Sonmiani Bay (Miani hor).

== Description ==
The size of the shell varies between 13 mm and 35 mm and is often colored with patterns of black, white or beige.

== Ecology ==
Parasites of Planaxis sulcatus include trematode Lobatostoma manteri.
