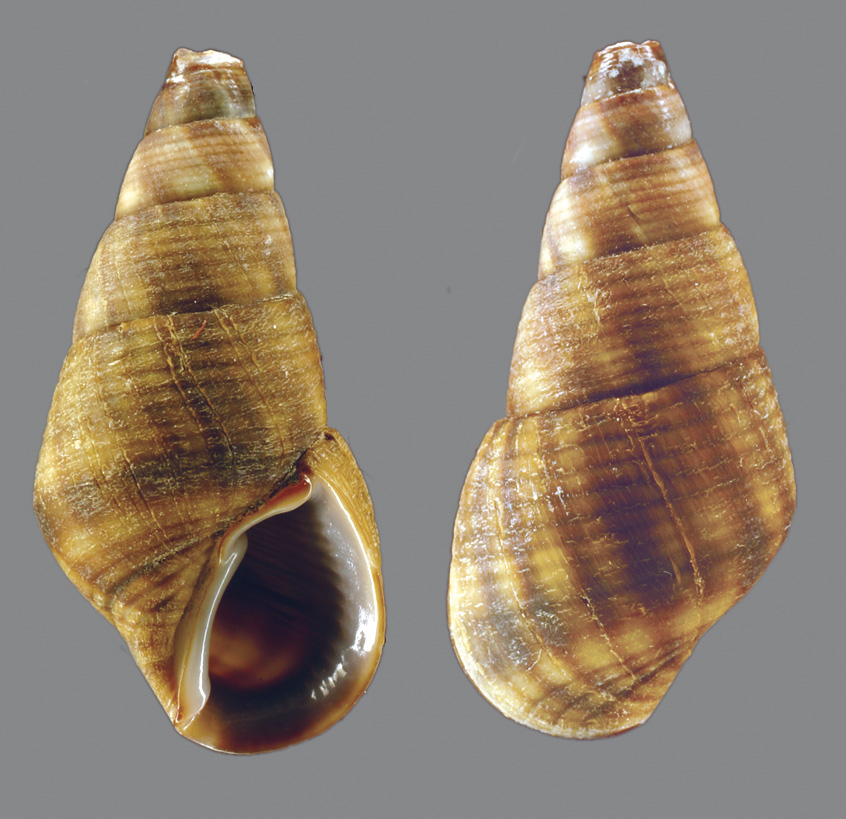
- Shell of Fissilabia decollata (specimen at MNHN, Paris)

Scientific classification
- Kingdom: Animalia
- Phylum: Mollusca
- Class: Gastropoda
- Subclass: Caenogastropoda
- Order: incertae sedis
- Superfamily: Cerithioidea
- Family: Planaxidae
- Genus: Fissilabia; MacGillivray, 1836

Type species
- Fissilabia fasciata MacGillivray, 1836

Synonyms
- Leucostoma Swainson, 1840 (invalid: junior homonym of Leucostoma Meigen, 1803 [Diptera]); Quoyia Gray, 1839

= Fissilabia =

Genus of gastropods

Fissilabia is a genus of sea snails, marine gastropod mollusks in the family Planaxidae.

== Species ==
Species within the genus Fissilabia include:

- Fissilabia decollata (Quoy & Gaimard, 1833)
- † Fissilabia houbricki Lozouet & Maestrati, 1995
- † Fissilabia mirabilis (Grateloup, 1834)

Species brought into synonymy

- Fissilabia fasciata MacGillivray, 1836: synonym of Fissilabia decollata (Quoy & Gaimard, 1833)
