= Vexilla vexillum =

Scientific classification
- Kingdom: Animalia
- Phylum: Mollusca
- Class: Gastropoda
- Subclass: Caenogastropoda
- Order: Neogastropoda
- Family: Muricidae
- Genus: Vexilla
- Species: V. vexillum

Binomial name
- Vexilla vexillum (Gmelin, 1791)

Synonyms
- Strombus vexillum Gmelin, 1791; Vexilla lineata A. Adams, 1853; Vexilla picta Swainson, 1840; Vexilla thaanumi Pilsbry, 1921

Species of gastropod

Vexilla vexillum, common name the vexillum rock snail, is a species of sea snail, a marine gastropod mollusk in the family Muricidae, the murex snails or rock snails.
