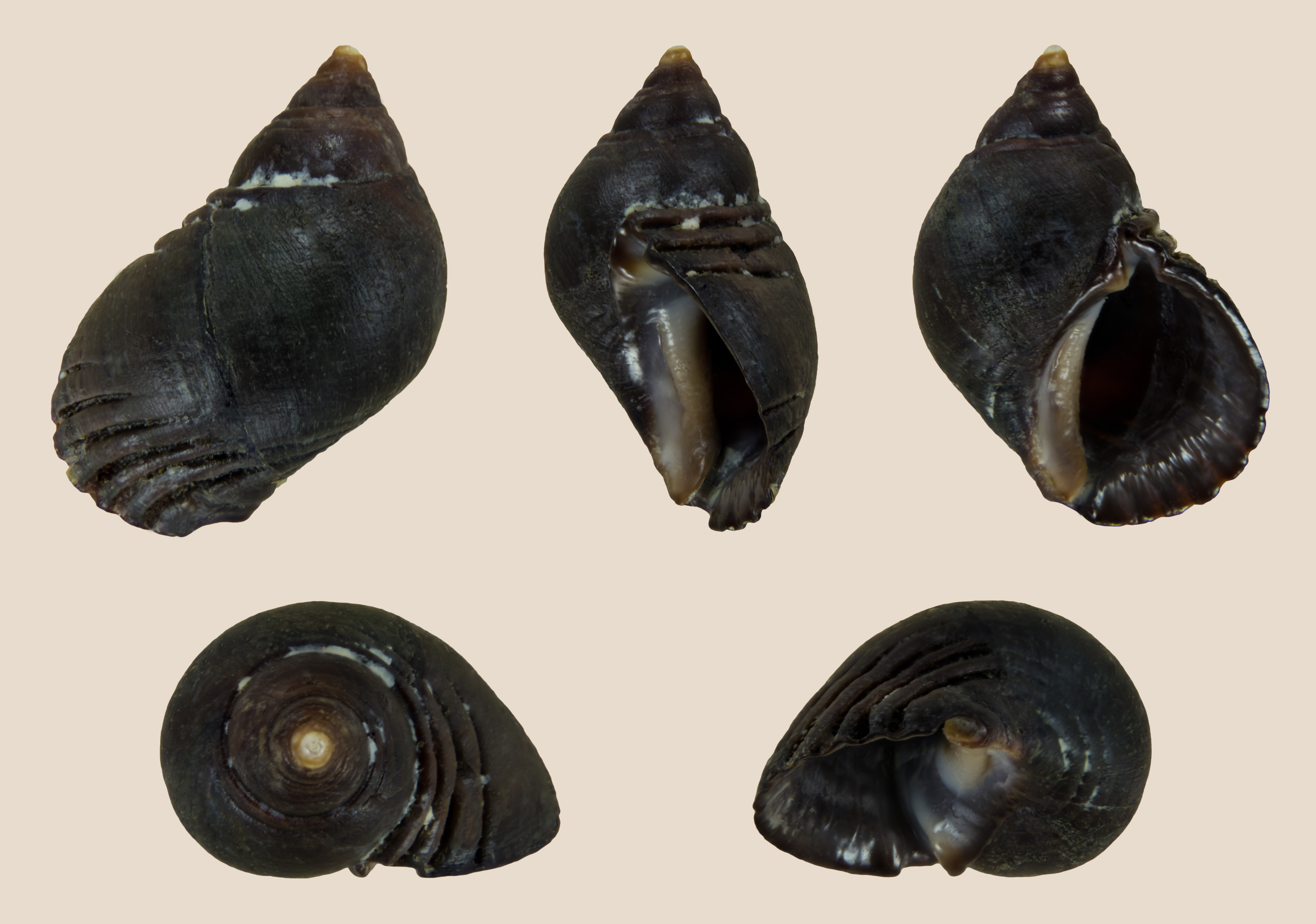

Scientific classification
- Kingdom: Animalia
- Phylum: Mollusca
- Class: Gastropoda
- Subclass: Caenogastropoda
- Order: incertae sedis
- Family: Planaxidae
- Genus: Supplanaxis
- Species: S. nucleus

Binomial name
- Supplanaxis nucleus (Bruguière, 1789)

Synonyms
- Buccinum nucleus Bruguière, 1789 (original combination); Planaxis nucleus (Bruguière, 1789); Planaxis semisulcatus Sowerby, G.B. I, 1823; Purpura nucleus (Bruguière, 1789)

= Supplanaxis nucleus =

Species of gastropod

Supplanaxis nucleus, common name the black Atlantic planaxis, is a species of small sea snail, a marine gastropod mollusk in the family Planaxidae.

== Distribution ==
This species occurs in the Caribbean Sea, the Gulf of Mexico and off the Lesser Antilles.

== Description ==
The maximum recorded shell length is 17 mm.

== Habitat ==
The minimum recorded depth is 0 m, while the maximum recorded depth is 3 m.
