= Vexilla taeniata =

Scientific classification
- Kingdom: Animalia
- Phylum: Mollusca
- Class: Gastropoda
- Subclass: Caenogastropoda
- Order: Neogastropoda
- Family: Muricidae
- Genus: Vexilla
- Species: V. taeniata

Binomial name
- Vexilla taeniata (Powis, 1835)

Synonyms
- Purpura striatella Garrett, 1857; Purpura taeniata Powis, 1835

Species of gastropod

Vexilla taeniata is a species of sea snail, a marine gastropod mollusk in the family Muricidae, the murex snails or rock snails.
