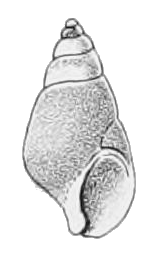
- An apertural view of a shell of Hinea brasiliana by Henry Suter

Scientific classification
- Kingdom: Animalia
- Phylum: Mollusca
- Class: Gastropoda
- Subclass: Caenogastropoda
- Order: incertae sedis
- Family: Planaxidae
- Genus: Hinea
- Species: H. brasiliana

Binomial name
- Hinea brasiliana (Lamarck, 1822)

Synonyms
- Buccinum brasilianum Lamarck, 1822; Planaxis mollis Sowerby, 1823; Planaxis brazilianus (Lamarck, 1822)

= Hinea brasiliana =

Species of gastropod

Hinea brasiliana, common name the yellow-coated clusterwink, is a species of small sea snail, a gastropod mollusc in the family Planaxidae. It is native to New Zealand and southeastern Australia where it is found in the littoral zone of rocky shores. It is one of only a few sea snail species able to bioluminesce.

== Taxonomy ==
This species was described by under the name Buccinum brasilianum by Jean-Baptiste Lamarck in 1822 based on the shell from the collection of William Paterson. The specific name brasiliana refer to the Brazil, because Lamarck thought, that it lives in the coast of Brazil. Unfortunately it does not live there. John Edward Gray moved this species to the newly created genus Hinea.

== Description ==
The shell of Hinea brasiliana is thick and heavy and grows to a length of about 21 mm (0.8 in). It is narrowly conical, either smooth or with shallow grooves between the approximately six spiral whorls. The aperture is small and constricted by a callus and the columella, the central structural axis, is thick. The shell is thin at the edge of the aperture but thickens rapidly away from the edge and this thickened part is marked with weak raised ridges known as lirae. There is a horny operculum which closes the shell when the soft parts are retracted inside. The colour of the shell is white both inside and out. The outer surface is protected at first by a yellowish-brown periostracum which eventually gets worn away.

== Distribution and habitat ==
In Australia, the range of Hinea brasiliana extends from the Burnett River in Queensland southwards to Mount Gambier in South Australia. In New Zealand it is found in the North Island and is also present on Lord Howe Island, Norfolk Island and the Kermadec Islands. It is found in the mid-literal zone of rocky shores, among boulders and rubble. It prefers high-energy shores but avoids the most exposed locations with high wave action. It is very common in Australia, so much so that the empty shells of dead snails form much of the shell debris washed up on beaches.

== Behaviour ==
When the tide is out, these snails tend to cluster together in moist places, hiding in crevices or under rocks. As soon as the tide comes in, they disperse to graze on microalgae. As in other members of the family Planaxidae, fertilisation is internal, and the embryos are retained in a brood chamber located behind the female's head. They are liberated into the sea and become planktonic at the veliger larval stage.

When disturbed, Hinea brasiliana emits a series of short flashes of bluish-green light. Impact with a fast-moving object brings on a more intense bioluminescent response. The light is produced from the mantle tissue and shines through the pale translucent shell, which acts to diffuse the light so that the whole shell glows. The light may serve to startle or dazzle a potential predator, and is emitted while the soft parts of the snail remain protected by its shell. It has been found that all other wavelengths of light are transmitted through the shell material and it is only the blue-green wavelength that is selectively diffused, effectively amplifying it and making its originator seem larger. The diffusion through the calcified shell is more efficient than through the best comparable commercial diffusers. As well as scaring away a persistent attacker such as a crab, the light might have a further defensive function in attracting a larger creature to prey on the crab, in the "burglar alarm" effect.
