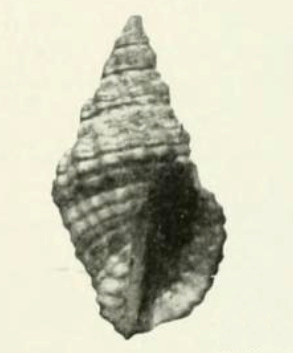
- Usilla tosana shell (holotype)

Scientific classification
- Kingdom: Animalia
- Phylum: Mollusca
- Class: Gastropoda
- Subclass: Caenogastropoda
- Order: Neogastropoda
- Family: Muricidae
- Genus: Usilla
- Species: U. tosana

Binomial name
- Usilla tosana (Pilsbry, 1904)

Synonyms
- Cronia (Usilla) tosana (Pilsbry, 1904); Cronia tosana (Pilsbry, 1904); Purpura tosana Pilsbry, 1904

= Usilla tosana =

Species of gastropod

Usilla tosana is a species of sea snail, a marine gastropod mollusk in the family Muricidae, the murex snails or rock snails.

== Description ==
The length of the shell attains 14 mm, its diameter 7.3 to 7.7 mm. and the length of the aperture 8 mm

(Original description) The small, imperforate shell is fusiform and solid. It is gray-white with an interrupted black-brown band below the suture, another below the periphery and a less distinct one at the base. The sculpture consists of numerous longitudinal rounded folds or waves, many of them followed by a raised line marking a former peristome. These folds are more distinct on the spire than on the body whorl, where there are 10 to 15 of them. The folds are crossed by numerous strong, rounded spiral cords, which are often weakly striate in the same direction, are wider than their deep intervals, and pass equally over folds and valleys. There are about 10 of these spiral cords on the body whorl, besides some small ones below the suture and in the intervals of the large cords on the basal slope. The interstices in well-preserved shells are delicately, closely lamellose. The spire is rather slender and acute. There are about 7 whorls in perfect shells, the first two forming a smooth, bulbous, shortly cylindric protoconch. Subsequent whorls are somewhat concave below the suture, then convex. The body whorl is inflated peripherally, contracted below, with a plicate basal fasciole. The aperture is slightly more than half the length of the shell, dark purplish-brown with light bands within. The outer lip is whitish, beveled, and finished with 3 to 6 small tubercles within. The siphonal canal is short and open.

== Distribution ==
This marine species occurs off Japan.
