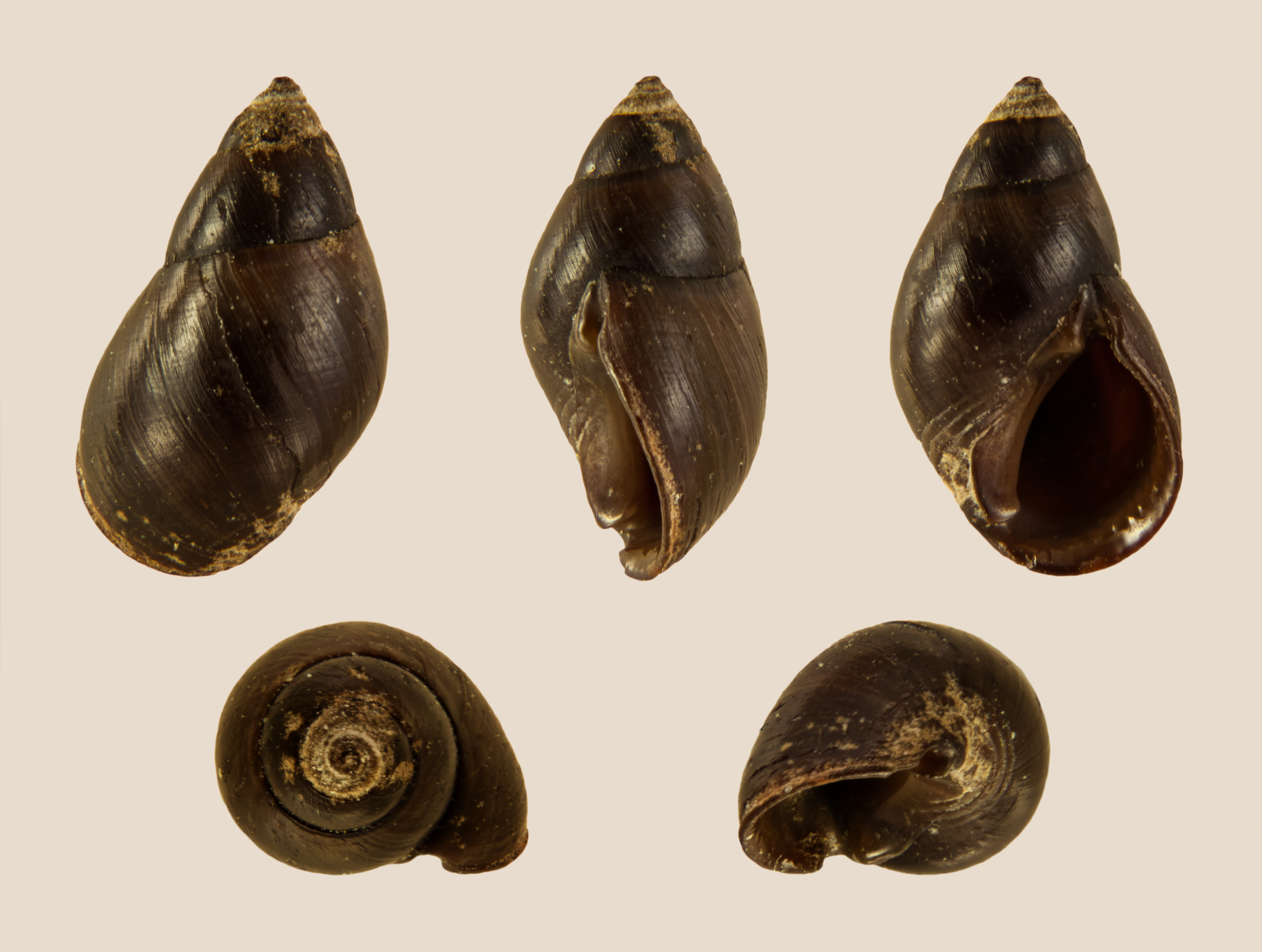
- Shell of Supplanaxis niger

Scientific classification
- Kingdom: Animalia
- Phylum: Mollusca
- Class: Gastropoda
- Subclass: Caenogastropoda
- Order: incertae sedis
- Family: Planaxidae
- Genus: Supplanaxis
- Species: S. niger

Binomial name
- Supplanaxis niger (Quoy & Gaimard, 1833)

Synonyms
- Planaxis abbreviata Pease, 1865; Planaxis abbreviata ogasawarana Pilsbry, 1905 ·; Planaxis atra Pease, 1869; Planaxis hanleyi E. A. Smith, 1872; Planaxis nicobaricus Frauenfeld, 1866; Planaxis niger Quoy & Gaimard, 1833 (original combination); Planaxis nigra [sic] (incorrect gender ending); Planaxis similis E. A. Smith, 1872; Supplanaxis abbreviatus (Pease, 1865)

= Supplanaxis niger =

Species of gastropod

Supplanaxis niger is a species of sea snail, a marine gastropod mollusk in the family Planaxidae.

== Description ==
The length of the shell attains 13 mm, its diameter 7.7 mm.

(Original description of Planaxis abbreviata ogasawarana Pilsbry, 1905)) The shell is larger and longer than Planaxis abbreviata Pease (synonym of Supplanaxis niger (Quoy & Gaimard, 1833)), ovate-conic, thick and solid, chocolate-brown, the body whorl covered with a dull fibrous cuticle. Sculpture of spiral grooves, often weak in the middle of the body whorl, strong below the suture and at the base. The shell contains about 6 convex whorls. The aperture is oblique, the outer lip is thickened within, and bearing 11 to 14 lirae, which extend into the throat. The basal and posterior notches are small, deep and rounded.

== Distribution ==
This marine species occurs off Madagascar, Japan and Papua New Guinea.
