= Hinea punctostriata =

Scientific classification
- Kingdom: Animalia
- Phylum: Mollusca
- Class: Gastropoda
- Subclass: Caenogastropoda
- Order: incertae sedis
- Family: Planaxidae
- Genus: Hinea
- Species: H. punctostriata

Binomial name
- Hinea punctostriata (E.A. Smith, 1872)

Synonyms
- Angiola punctostriata (E. A. Smith, 1872); Planaxis punctorostratus (misspelling); Planaxis punctostriatus E.A. Smith, 1872

Species of gastropod

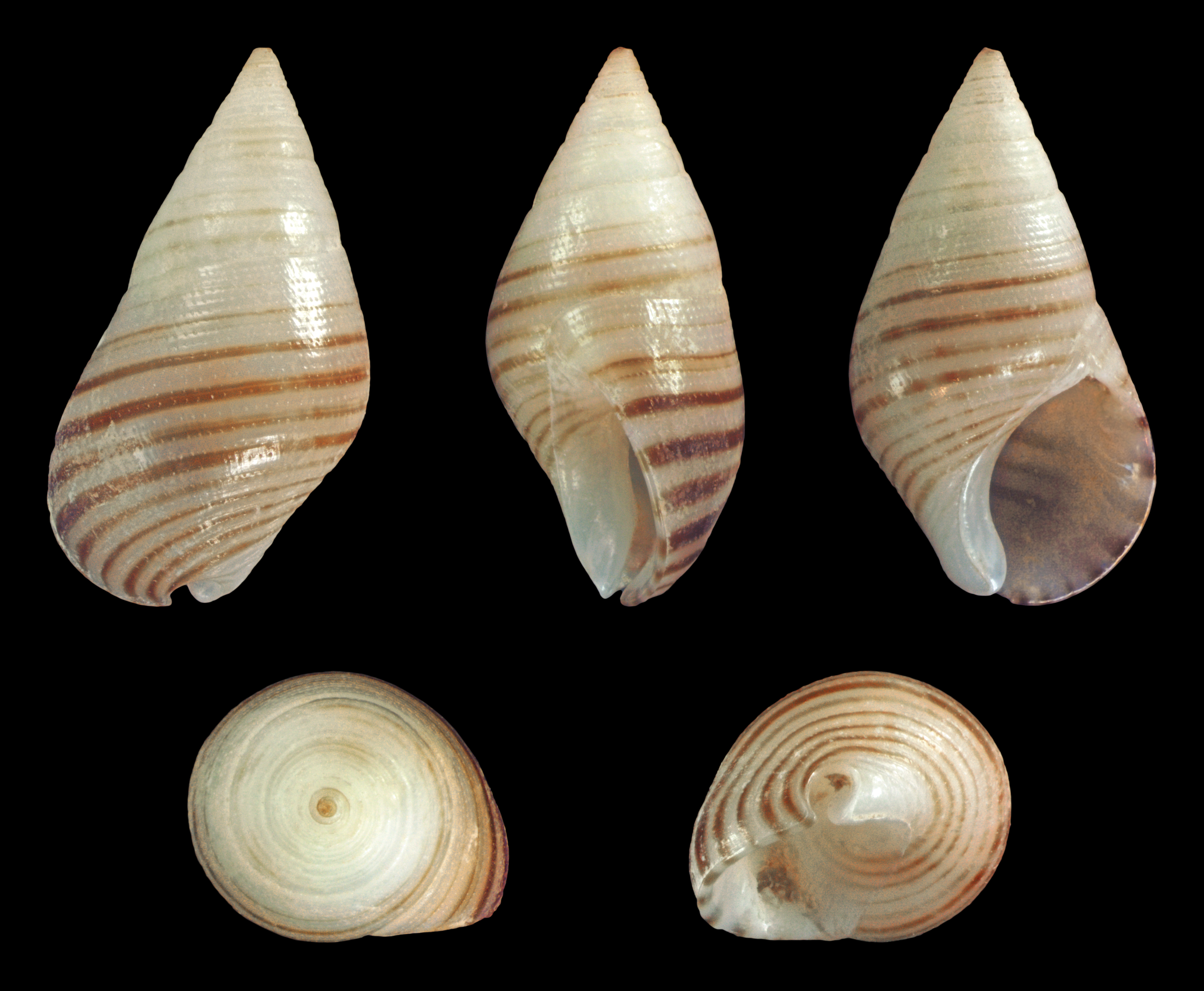
A punctostriata specimen dated to 1872

Hinea punctostriata is a species of sea snail, a marine gastropod mollusk in the family Planaxidae.

== Description ==
The Hinea punctostriata can be identified by its thin, brown and white stripes wrapping around its shell. On average, it is 4 mm in length.

== Distribution ==
This species occurs in the European part of the Atlantic Ocean, the Mediterranean Sea and the Red Sea.
