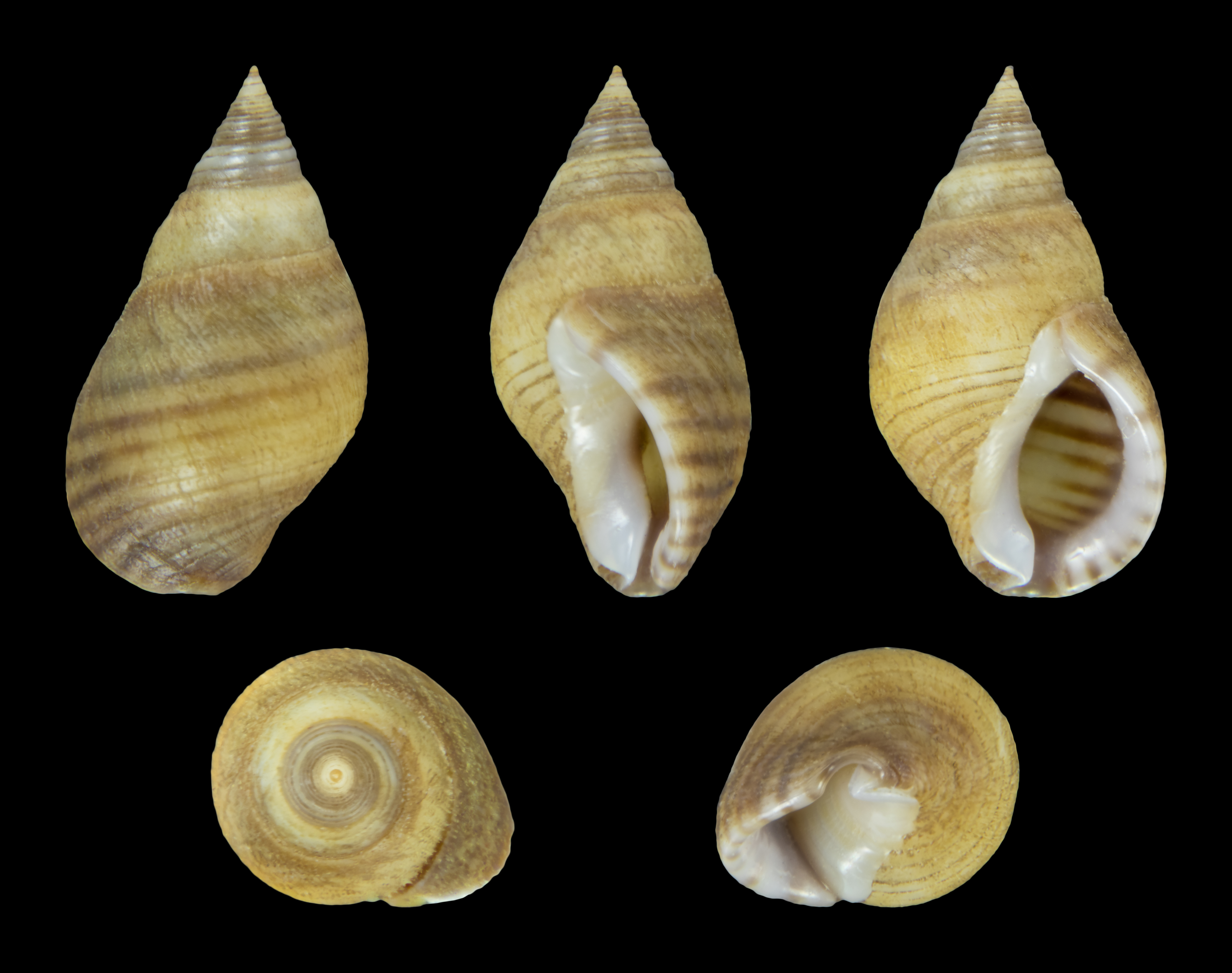
- Hinea zonata

Scientific classification
- Kingdom: Animalia
- Phylum: Mollusca
- Class: Gastropoda
- Subclass: Caenogastropoda
- Order: incertae sedis
- Family: Planaxidae
- Genus: Hinea; Gray, 1847

Type species
- Planaxis mollis G. B. Sowerby I, 1823

Synonyms
- Angiola Dall, 1926

= Hinea =

Genus of gastropods

Hinea is a genus of small sea snails, marine gastropod molluscs in the family Planaxidae.

== Species ==
Species in the genus Hinea include:

- Hinea akuana (Rehder, 1980)
- Hinea atra (Pease, 1869)
- Hinea brasiliana (Lamarck, 1822)
- Hinea fasciata (Pease, 1868)
- Hinea inepta (Gould, 1861)
- Hinea lineata (E. M. da Costa, 1778) - dwarf planaxis
- Hinea longispira (E. A. Smith, 1872)
- Hinea nucleola (Mörch, 1876)
- Hinea punctostriata (E. A. Smith, 1872)
- Hinea zonata (A. Adams, 1853)
