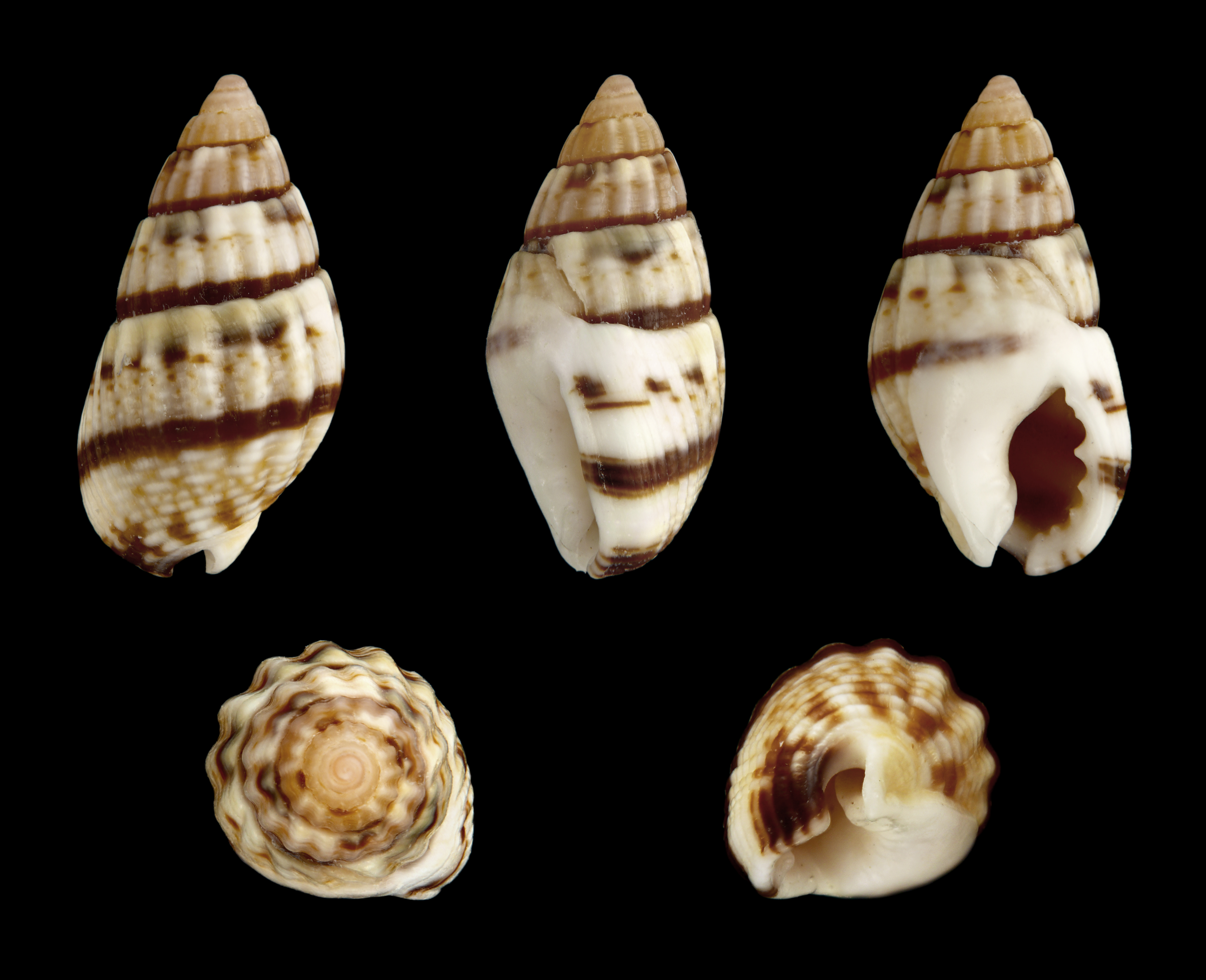

Scientific classification
- Kingdom: Animalia
- Phylum: Mollusca
- Class: Gastropoda
- Subclass: Caenogastropoda
- Order: Neogastropoda
- Family: Nassariidae
- Genus: Tritia
- Species: T. corrugata

Binomial name
- Tritia corrugata (Brocchi, 1814)

Synonyms
- See list

= Tritia corrugata =

Species of gastropod

Tritia corrugata, common name the one-banded nassa, is a species of sea snail, a marine gastropod mollusk in the family Nassariidae, the Nassa mud snails or dog whelks.

== List of synonyms ==
List of synonyms of Tritia corrugata
- Buccinum costulatum Renieri, 1804 (unavailable name: published in a work placed on Official Index by ICZN Opinion 316)
- Buccinum cuvierii Payraudeau, 1826 (original combination)
- Buccinum elegans O. G. Costa, 1830 (invalid: junior homonym of Buccinum elegans J. de C. Sowerby, 1824, and Buccinum elegans Risso, 1826)
- Buccinum ferussaci Payraudeau, 1826
- Buccinum flexuosum Costa O.G., 1830
- Buccinum subdiaphanum Bivona Ant., 1832
- Buccinum variabile Philippi, 1836
- Buccinum variabile var. media Philippi, 1836
- Eione sulcata Risso, 1826 (dubious synonym)
- Hima candida Coen, 1937
- Hinia costulata (Brocchi, 1814)
- Hinia fulva Ghisotti, 1986
- Hinia juliae Ghisotti, 1986
- Hinia lopadusae Ghisotti, 1986
- Hinia phasianella Ghisotti, 1986
- Hinia pulchella Ghisotti, 1986
- Hinia signata Ghisotti, 1986
- Hinia vitrea Coen, 1914
- Nassa bucquoyi Locard, 1887 (dubious synonym)
- Nassa corrupta Locard & Caziot, 1900
- Nassa costulata (Renieri, 1804)
- Nassa costulata var. atra Brusina, 1869
- Nassa costulata var. castanea Brusina, 1869
- Nassa costulata var. costata Bucquoy, Dautzenberg & Dollfus, 1882
- Nassa costulata var. flavida Bucquoy, Dautzenberg & Dollfus, 1882
- Nassa costulata var. lanceolata Bucquoy, Dautzenberg & Dollfus, 1882
- Nassa costulata var. pulcherrima Bucquoy, Dautzenberg & Dollfus, 1882
- Nassa costulata var. tenuicosta Bucquoy, Dautzenberg & Dollfus, 1882
- Nassa costulata var. turgida Bucquoy, Dautzenberg & Dollfus, 1882
- Nassa costulata var. zonata Brusina, 1869
- Nassarius (Telasco) cuvierii (Payraudeau, B.-C., 1826)
- Nassa cuvieri [sic] (misspelling of Nassa cuvierii (Payraudeau, 1826))
- Nassa cuvieri var. varicosa Locard, 1887
- Nassa cuvierii (Payraudeau, 1826)
- Nassa dautzembergi Mari, 1928
- Nassa encaustica Brusina, 1869
- Nassa ferussaci (Payraudeau, 1826)
- Nassa ferussaci arcuata Pallary, 1904
- Nassa ferussaci exigua Pallary, 1904
- Nassa ferussaci pallaryi Koch in Pallary, 1906
- Nassa ferussaci var. alexandrina Pallary, 1912 (dubious synonym)
- Nassa ferussaci var. claudoni Pallary, 1906
- Nassa guernei Locard, 1886
- Nassa mabillei Locard, 1887
- Nassa madeirensis Reeve, 1854
- Nassa semicostata Locard, 1887
- Nassa subcostulata Locard, 1886 (dubious synonym)
- Nassa turgida (Bucquoy, Dautzenberg & Dollfus, 1882 )
- Nassa turgida var. compacta Pallary, 1912
- Nassarius cuvierii (Payraudeau, 1826)
- Planaxis beudantiana Risso, 1826
- Planaxis fitcheliana Risso, 1826
- Planaxis lineolata Risso, 1826
- Planaxis loques Risso, 1826
- Planaxis molliana Risso, 1826
- Planaxis riparia Risso, 1826
- Planaxis tenuis Risso, 1826
- Tritia cuvierii (Payraudeau, 1826) junior subjective synonym

== Description ==
The length of the shell varies from 9 mm to 20 mm.

The small shell is ovate, conical, rather shining, and pointed. The spire is formed of six or seven indistinct whorls, often ornamented with longitudinal folds, which are rarely continued to the base of the body whorl, and which are crossed by very fine and slightly marked transverse striae. The aperture is white. The outer lip is thick, white externally, and denticulated within. The columella is smooth and shows two guttules at the base. The coloring of the shell is very various. The ground color is generally of a yellowish white. The transverse striae are accompanied with very fine lines, white and of a red bay color. Reddish, or bluish brown spots, intersected with white, form zones upon the upper part of each whorl. At the base, and the middle of the lowest, the brown lines are more marked.

== Distribution ==
This species occurs in the Mediterranean Sea and in the Atlantic Ocean off the Azores.
