= Hinea longispira =

Scientific classification
- Kingdom: Animalia
- Phylum: Mollusca
- Class: Gastropoda
- Subclass: Caenogastropoda
- Order: incertae sedis
- Superfamily: Cerithioidea
- Family: Planaxidae
- Genus: Hinea
- Species: H. longispira

Binomial name
- Hinea longispira (E. A. Smith, 1872)

Synonyms
- Angiola longispira (E. A. Smith, 1872); Angiola periscelida Dall, 1926; Planaxis longispira E. A. Smith, 1872 (original combination)

Species of gastropod

Hinea longispira is a species of sea snail, a marine gastropod mollusk in the family Planaxidae.

== Distribution ==
This marine species occurs off Japan.
