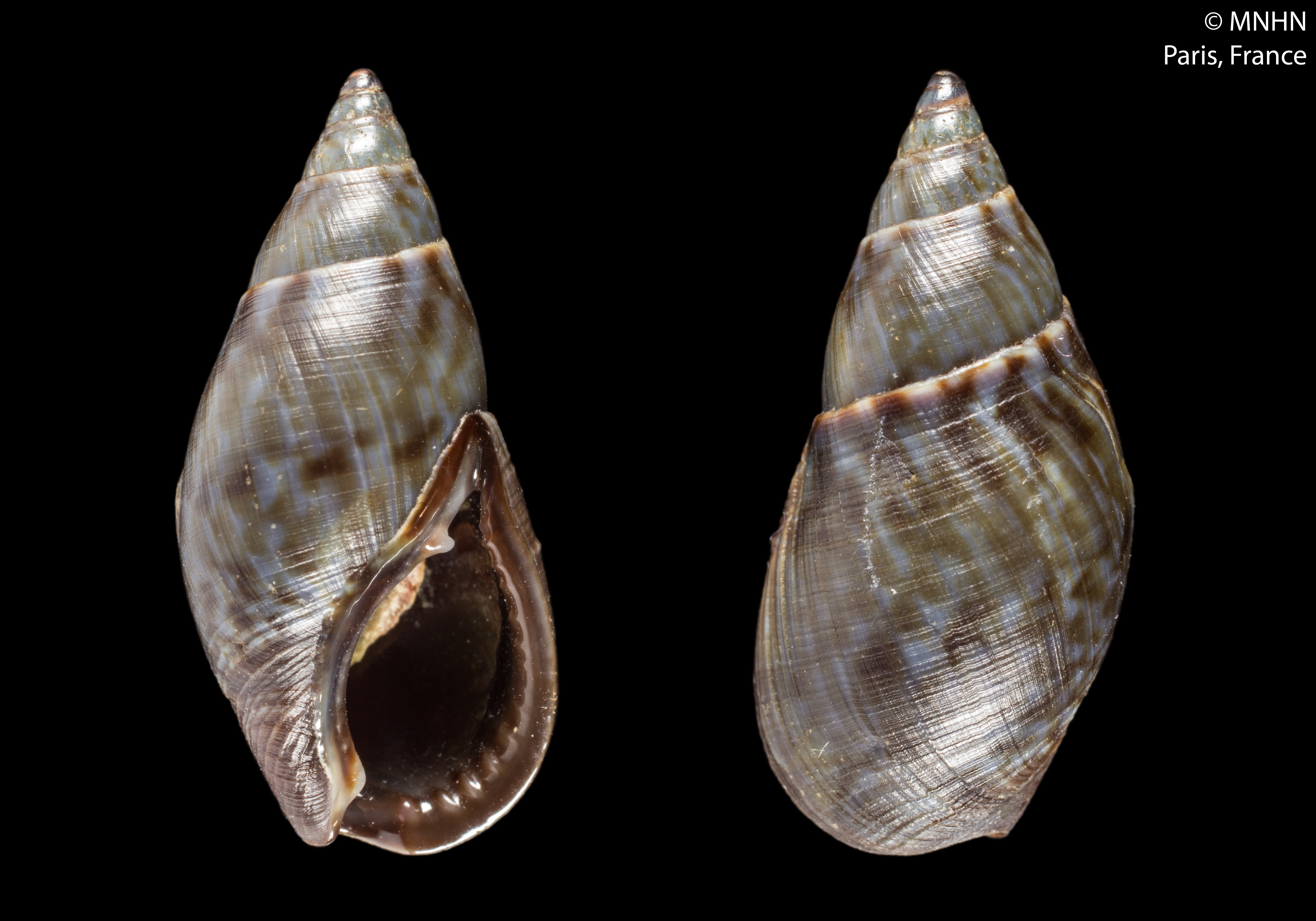
- Shell of Supplanaxis leyteensis (holotype at MNHN, Paris)

Scientific classification
- Kingdom: Animalia
- Phylum: Mollusca
- Class: Gastropoda
- Subclass: Caenogastropoda
- Order: incertae sedis
- Superfamily: Cerithioidea
- Family: Planaxidae
- Genus: Supplanaxis; Thiele, 1929

Type species
- Buccinum nucleus Bruguière, 1789

Synonyms
- Planaxis (Proplanaxis) Thiele, 1929; Planaxis (Supplanaxis) Thiele, 1929

= Supplanaxis =

Genus of gastropods

Supplanaxis is a genus of small sea snails, marine gastropod mollusks in the subfamily Planaxinae of the family Planaxidae.

== Species ==
Species within the genus Supplanaxis include:

- Supplanaxis acutus (Krauss, 1848)
- † Supplanaxis beaumonti (Bayan, 1870)
- Supplanaxis leyteensis Poppe, Tagaro & Stahlschmidt, 2015
- Supplanaxis nancyae (Petuch, 2013)
- Supplanaxis niger (Quoy & Gaimard, 1833)
- Supplanaxis nucleus (Bruguière, 1789)
- Supplanaxis obsoletus (Menke, 1851)
- Supplanaxis planicostatus (G. B. Sowerby I, 1825)

Species brought into synonymy

- Supplanaxis abbreviatus (Pease, 1865): synonym of Supplanaxis niger (Quoy & Gaimard, 1833)
- Supplanaxis acuta [sic] : synonym of Supplanaxis acutus (Krauss, 1848)
