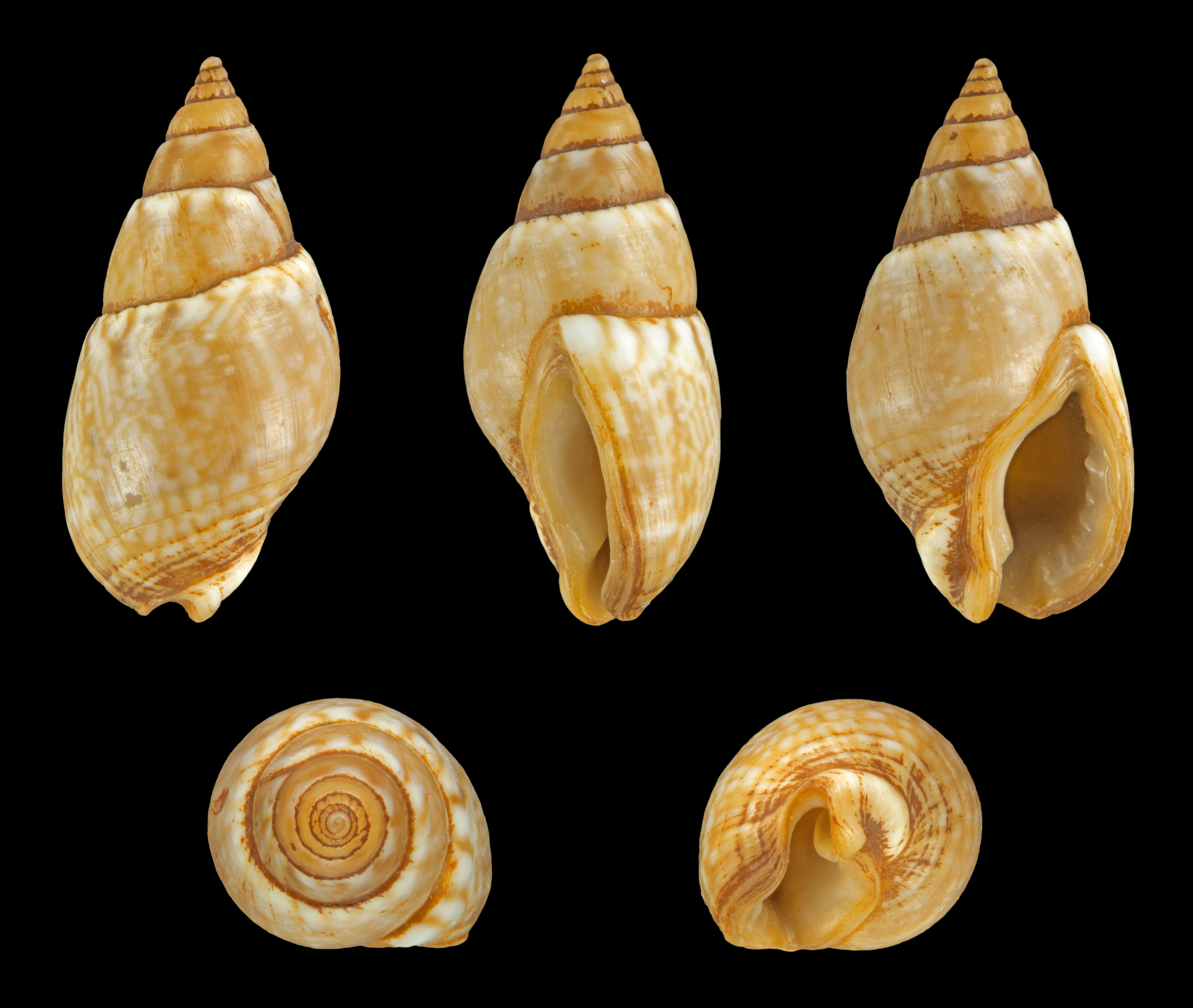

Scientific classification
- Kingdom: Animalia
- Phylum: Mollusca
- Class: Gastropoda
- Subclass: Caenogastropoda
- Order: Neogastropoda
- Family: Nassariidae
- Genus: Tritia
- Species: T. corniculum

Binomial name
- Tritia corniculum (Olivi, 1792)

Synonyms
- Amycla corniculata Locard, 1886; Amycla corniculum (Olivi, 1792); Amycla corniculum var. albomaculata Bucquoy, Dautzenberg & Dollfus, 1882; Amycla corniculum var. atrata Bucquoy, Dautzenberg & Dollfus, 1882; Amycla corniculum var. carneola Bucquoy, Dautzenberg & Dollfus, 1882; Amycla corniculum var. elongata Bucquoy, Dautzenberg & Dollfus, 1882; Amycla corniculum var. flavida Bucquoy, Dautzenberg & Dollfus, 1882; Amycla corniculum var. lineolata Bucquoy, Dautzenberg & Dollfus, 1882; Amycla corniculum var. minor Bucquoy, Dautzenberg & Dollfus, 1882; Amycla corniculum var. punctulata Bucquoy, Dautzenberg & Dollfus, 1882; Amycla inflata Locard, 1892; Amycla luteostoma Coen, 1933; Amycla monterosatoi Locard, 1886; Buccinum calmeilii Payraudeau, 1826; Buccinum corniculum Olivi, 1792 (original combination); Buccinum decollatum Philippi, 1844; Buccinum dermestoideum Payraudeau, 1826; Buccinum fasciolatum Lamarck, 1822 (synonym; preoccupied by Buccinum fasciolatum Gmelin, 1791); Buccinum oblongum Sassi, 1827; Buccinum politum Bivona Ant., 1832; Buccinum semiplicatum O. G. Costa, 1830; Nassa (Amycla) corniculum (Olivi, 1792); Nassa (Amycla) corniculum var. aurea Pallary, 1900; Nassa dautzenbergi de Gregorio, 1885; Nassa fasciolatus "Gronovius" Hirase, S., 1936; Nassa flava Marrat, 1877; Nassa gibberula Marrat, 1877; Nassa mitrella de Gregorio, 1885; Nassa quercina Marrat, 1877; Nassa sparta Marrat, 1877; Nassarius (Gussonea) corniculus (Olivi, A.G., 1792); Nassarius corniculum (Olivi, 1792); Planaxis discrepans Risso, 1826; Planaxis olivacea Risso, 1826; Planaxis raricosta Risso, 1826; Planaxis trifasciata Risso, 1826

= Tritia corniculum =

Species of gastropod

Tritia corniculum, common name the horn nassa, is a species of sea snail, a marine gastropod mollusk in the family Nassariidae, the Nassa mud snails or dog whelks.

== Spelling ==
Originally introduced in the binomen Buccinum corniculum, the specific epithet is to be considered a noun (meaning "a small horn on a soldier's helmet") and is invariant.

== Description ==
The ovate, conical shell is thick, smooth, and pointed at its summit. Length varies between 8 mm (0.3 in) and 20 mm (0.8 in). The spire is composed of six or seven slightly distinct whorls. The suture is moderately deep. There are a few transverse striae at the base of the body whorl. The aperture is pretty large, ovate, violet-colored or chestnut, and dilated towards the middle. The outer lip is sharp and denticulated within. The left lip is thick and partially covers the columella in its whole extent. The epidermis is thin, of a greenish- or reddish-brown, and beneath are perceived transverse zones, with spots of a slate- or violet-gray color, along with a decurrent white band, articulated with brown or bay-colored spots upon the suture.

== Distribution ==
This species occurs in the Mediterranean Sea and in the Atlantic Ocean off West Africa and the Azores.

=== Tritia corniculum var. minor ===
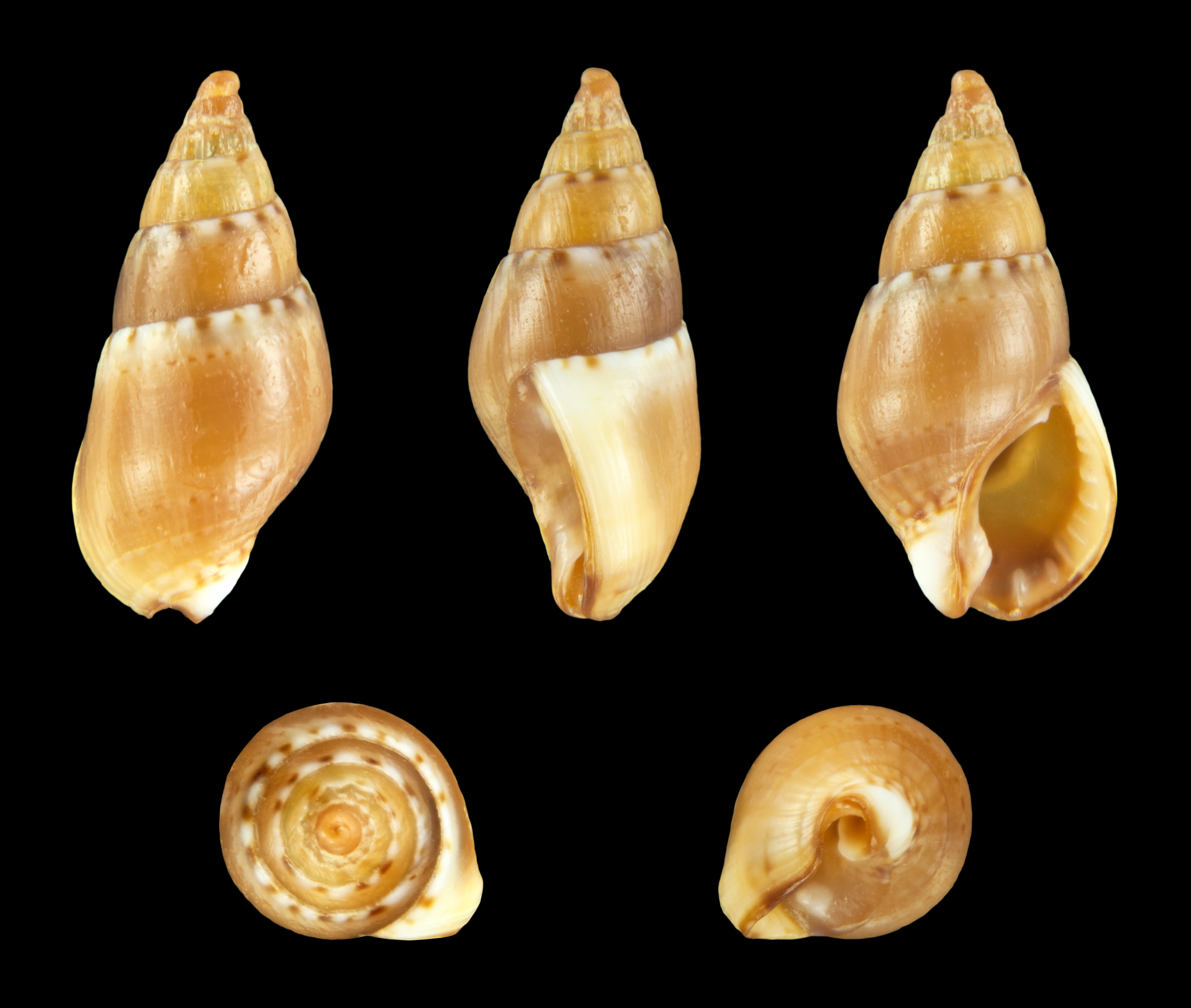
Brown form

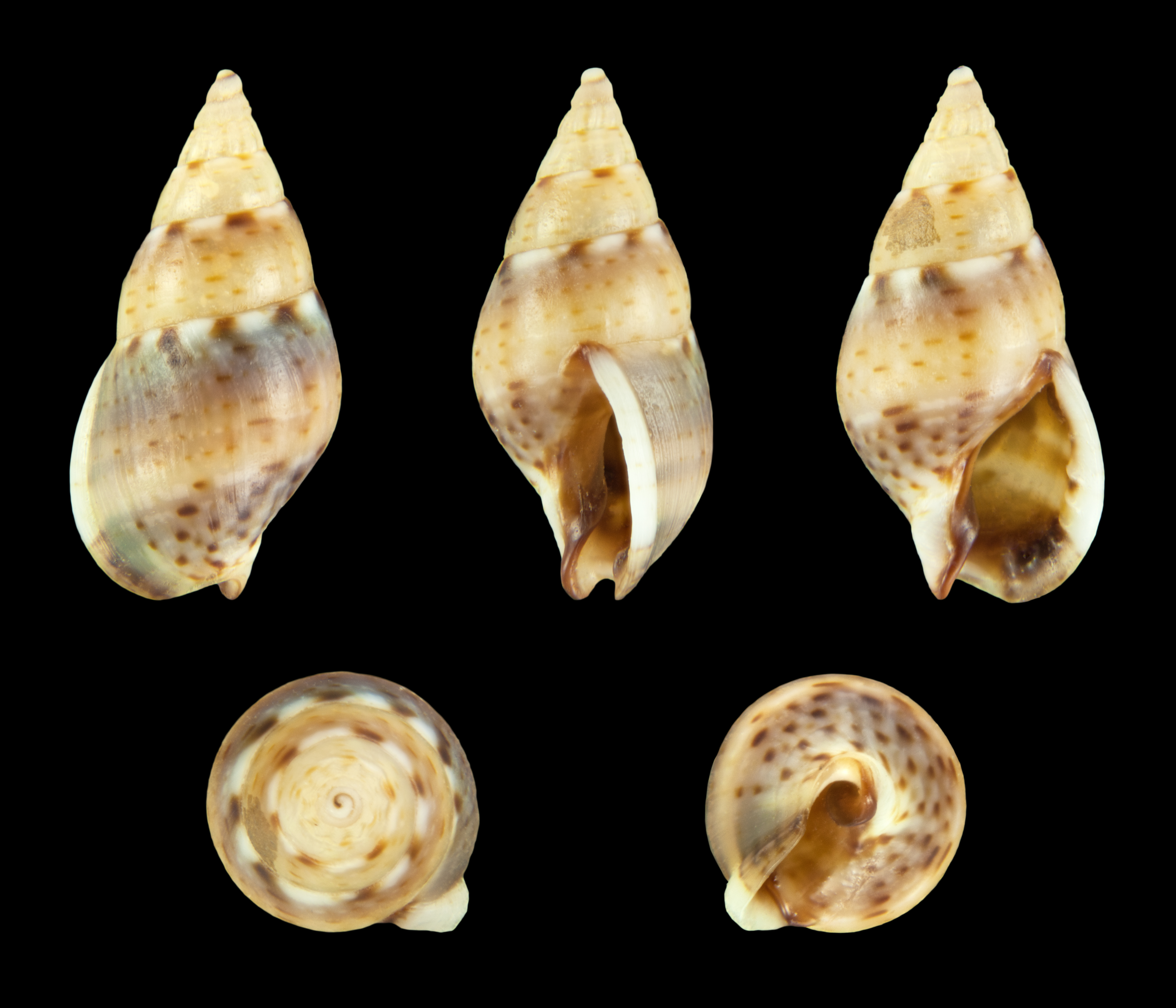
Spotted form
