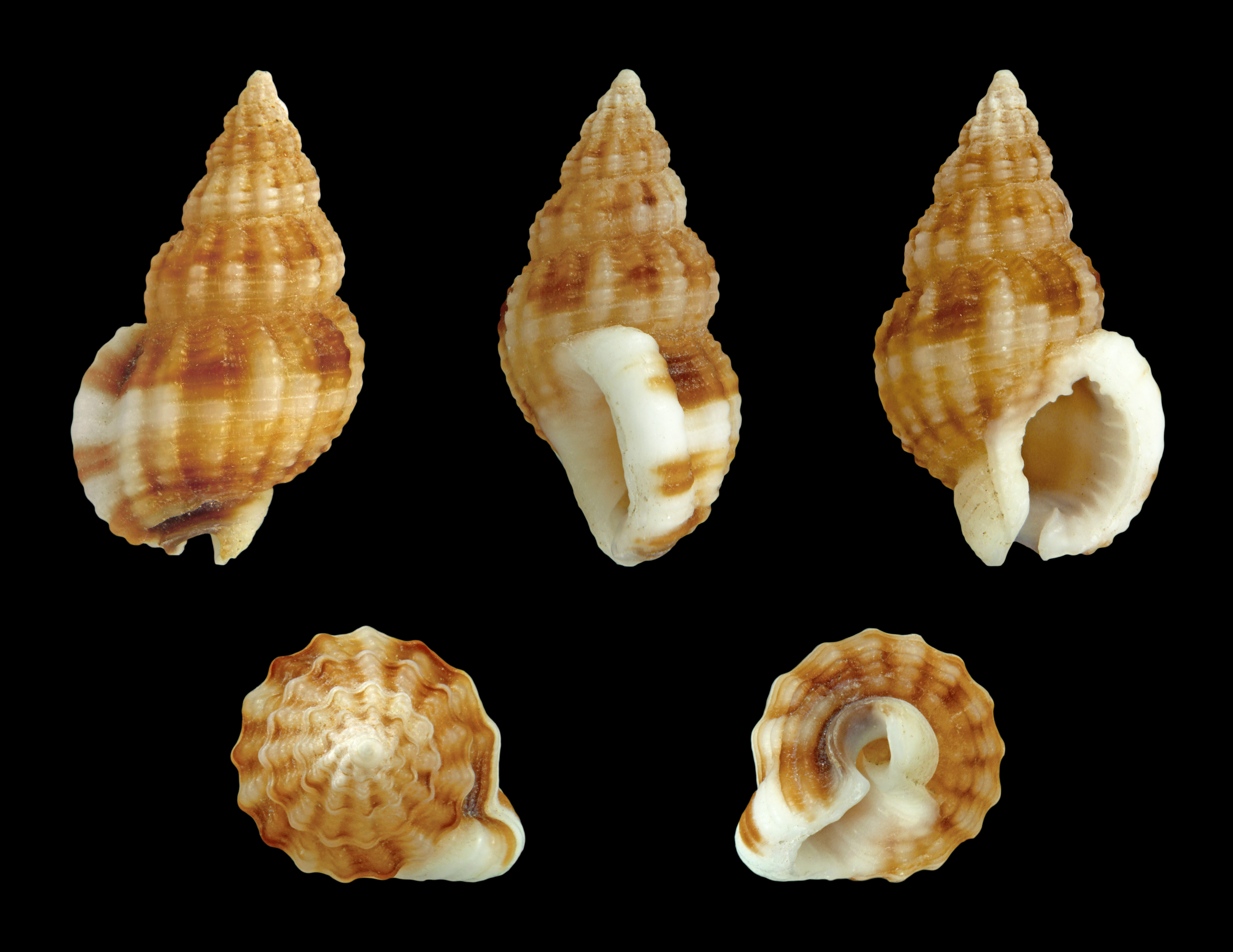
- Shell of Tritia incrassata

Scientific classification
- Kingdom: Animalia
- Phylum: Mollusca
- Class: Gastropoda
- Subclass: Caenogastropoda
- Order: Neogastropoda
- Family: Nassariidae
- Genus: Tritia
- Species: T. incrassata

Binomial name
- Tritia incrassata (Ström, 1768)

Synonyms
- Buccinum ascanias Bruguière, 1789; Buccinum coccinella Lamarck, 1822; Buccinum incrassatum Strøm, 1768 (original combination); Buccinum lacepedii Payraudeau, 1826; Buccinum macula Montagu, 1803; Buccinum minutum Pennant, 1777; Hinia incrassata (Ström, 1768); Nassa delicata Reeve, 1854; Nassa deshayesii Drouet, 1858; Nassa elongata Bucquoy, Dautzenberg & Dollfus, 1882; Nassa goreensis Maltzan, 1884; Nassa interjecta Locard, 1886; Nassa intermedia Forbes, 1844; Nassa jousseaumi Locard, 1886; Nassa rosacea Reeve, 1854; Nassa saxatilis Brusina, 1870; Nassa senegalensis Maltzan, 1884; Nassa tenella Reeve, 1854; Nassa valliculata Locard, 1886; Nassa varicosa Bucquoy, Dautzenberg & Dollfus, 1882; Nassarius (Hinia) incrassatus (Ström, 1768); Nassarius incrassatus (Strøm, 1768); Planaxis affinis Risso, 1826; Planaxis desmarestiana Risso, 1826; Planaxis rosacea Risso, 1826

= Tritia incrassata =

Species of gastropod

Tritia incrassata, common name the thick-lipped dog whelk, is a species of small sea snail, a marine gastropod mollusk in the family Nassariidae, the Nassa mud snails or dog whelks.

== Description ==
The shell up to 15 mm high with rather high spire and a rounded body whorl. The protoconch is small, distinctly cyrtoconoid with 2.5 smooth whorls. The teleoconch contains 6-7 convex whorls, with a sculpture of regular spiral cords, broader than the interspaces. Its axial folds become distinctly flexuous on the body whorl. The aperture is bordered externally with a strong varix forming a rim, normally unique - not repeated at the earlier growth stages on the spire. The inner side of the outer lip bears ca. 10 denticles, elongated in the spiral direction. The parietal edge of the aperture forms a very thin, appressed callus, with a distinct adapical denticle, continued into a thicker columellar callus with a slightly raised edge. The base of the body whorl has a groove delimiting the outer part of the siphonal canal.

The colour of the shell is extremely variable, with distinct combinations of brown, black, yellowish or orange hues, most often with a paler band on abapical part of spire whorls and periphery of body whorls. Elsewhere it is arranged in bands or in spiral series of blotches, or uniform. The aperture is white with a highly diagnostic black blotch inside the siphonal canal.

== Distribution ==
This species occurs in European waters, throughout the Mediterranean Sea and the Eastern Atlantic Ocean (from Norway to southern Morocco, also off the Canary Is. and the Azores) at depths between the shoreline to ca. 100 m.
