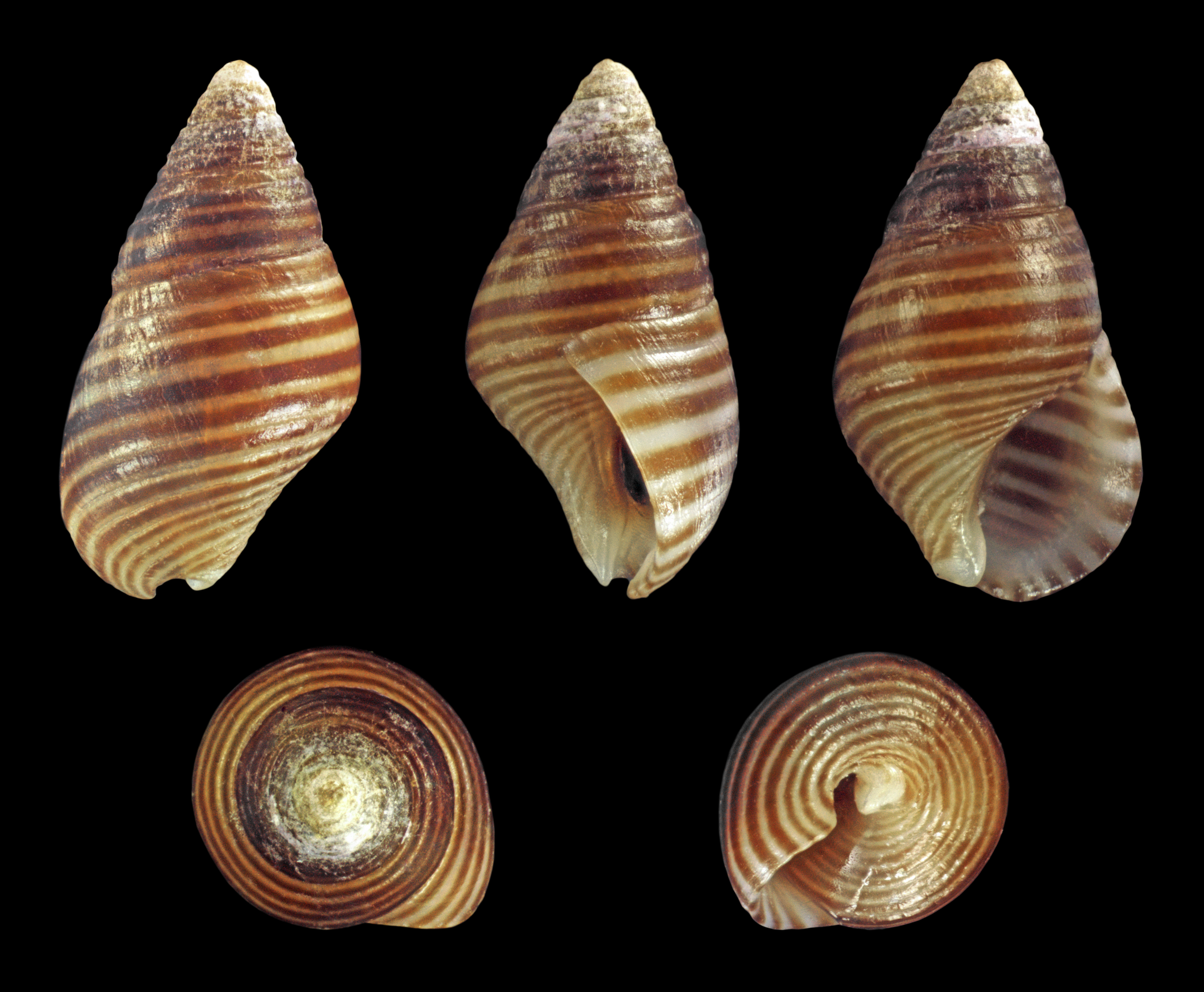

Scientific classification
- Kingdom: Animalia
- Phylum: Mollusca
- Class: Gastropoda
- Subclass: Caenogastropoda
- Order: incertae sedis
- Family: Planaxidae
- Genus: Hinea
- Species: H. lineata

Binomial name
- Hinea lineata (da Costa, 1778)

Synonyms
- Angiola lineata (da Costa, 1778); Buccinum lineatum da Costa, 1778 (original combination); Buccinum zebra Megerle von Mühlfeldt, 1816; Planaxis eboreus E. A. Smith, 1872; Planaxis lineatus (da Costa, 1778)

= Hinea lineata =

Species of gastropod

Hinea lineata, common name the dwarf Atlantic planaxis, is a species of sea snail, a marine gastropod mollusk in the family Planaxidae.

== Distribution ==
This species occurs in the following locations:

- Atlantic Ocean : Angola, Cape Verdes, West Africa, St. Helena
- Gulf of Mexico
- Caribbean Sea
- Lesser Antilles

== Description ==
The maximum recorded shell length is 10 mm.

The very small shell is ovate, conical, smooth, and diaphanous. It is colored with white, elegantly ornamented upon its whole surface with pretty numerous, narrow, transverse lines, of a blackish brown. The spire is composed of six slightly convex whorls. The body whorl is inflated, and larger than all the others united. The linear suture is very fine. The aperture is subrounded, of violet color and within are perceived the external colored lines. The outer is lip simple, thin and sharp. Its edge is expanded and marked with brown lines. The columella is smooth and arcuated.

== Habitat ==
Minimum recorded depth is 0 m. Maximum recorded depth is 48 m.
