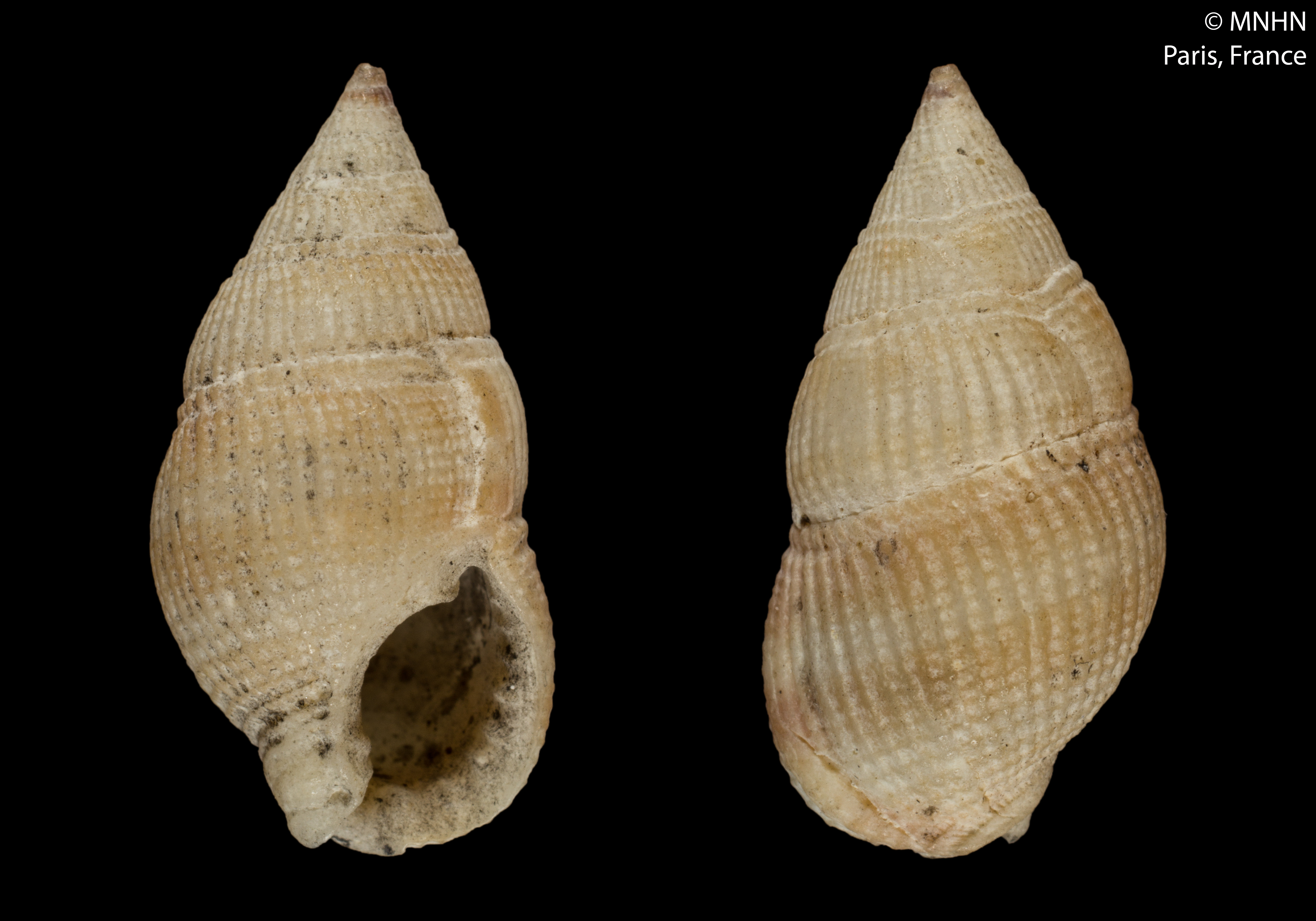
- Shell of Nassarius concinnus (syntype at MNHN, Paris)

Scientific classification
- Kingdom: Animalia
- Phylum: Mollusca
- Class: Gastropoda
- Subclass: Caenogastropoda
- Order: Neogastropoda
- Family: Nassariidae
- Subfamily: Nassariinae
- Genus: Nassarius
- Species: N. concinnus

Binomial name
- Nassarius concinnus (Powys, 1835)

Synonyms
- Allanassa concentrica (Marrat, 1874); Allanassa concinna (Powys, 1835); Hima concinna (Powys, 1835); Nassa (Hima) concinna Powys, 1835; Nassa (Hima) cribaria Marrat, 1877; Nassa (Zeuxis) concinna Powys, 1835; Nassa concentrica Marrat, 1874; Nassa concinna Powys, 1835 (original combination); Nassa concinna f. minor Schepman, 1907; Nassa crebrilineata Hombron & Jacquinot, 1848; Nassa cribaria Marrat, 1877; Nassa rotundicostata Marrat, 1877; † Nassarius (Alectrion) pseudomundus Oostingh, 1935; Nassarius (Niotha) concinus (Powys, 1835); Nassarius (Zeuxis) concinnus (Powys, 1835); Niotha voluptabilis Jousseaume, 1894; Planaxis areolatus Lesson, 1842; Zeuxis concinus (Powys, 1835)

= Nassarius concinnus =

Species of gastropod

Nassarius concinnus is a species of sea snail, a marine gastropod mollusc in the family Nassariidae, the nassa mud snails or dog whelks.

== Description ==
The length of the shell attains 16.8 mm.

== Distribution ==
This marine species occurs off Tahiti, French Polynesia.
