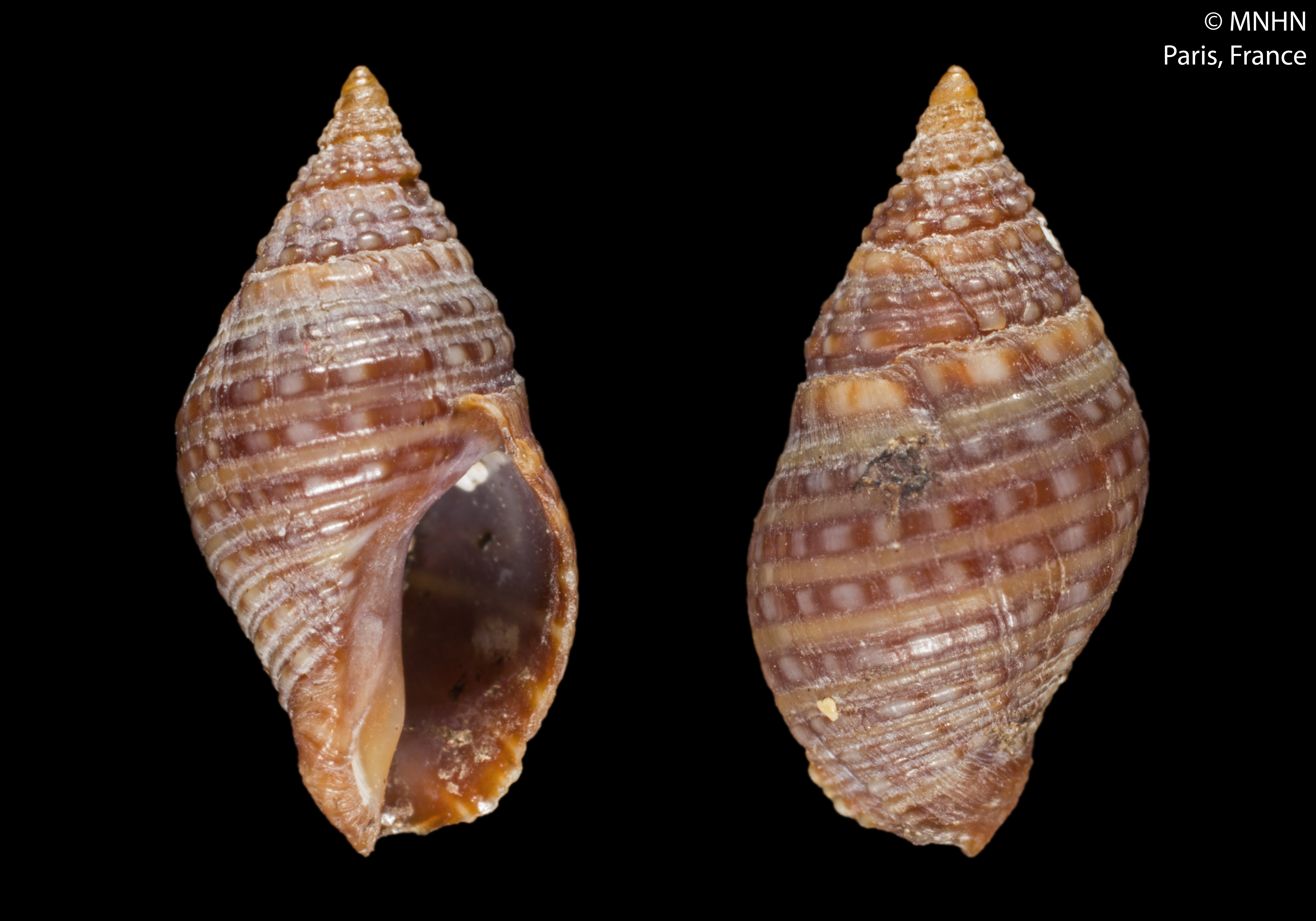
- Shell of Usilla avenacea

Scientific classification
- Kingdom: Animalia
- Phylum: Mollusca
- Class: Gastropoda
- Subclass: Caenogastropoda
- Order: Neogastropoda
- Superfamily: Muricoidea
- Family: Muricidae
- Subfamily: Ergalataxinae
- Genus: Usilla; H. Adams, 1861

Synonyms
- Cronia (Usilla) H. Adams & A. Adams, 1861; Vexilla (Usilla) H. Adams, 1861

= Usilla (gastropod) =

Genus of gastropods

Usilla is a genus of sea snails, marine gastropod mollusks, in the subfamily Ergalataxinae of the family Muricidae.

== Species ==
Species within the genus Usilla include:

- Usilla avenacea (Lesson, 1842)
- Usilla tosana (Pilsbry, 1904)
