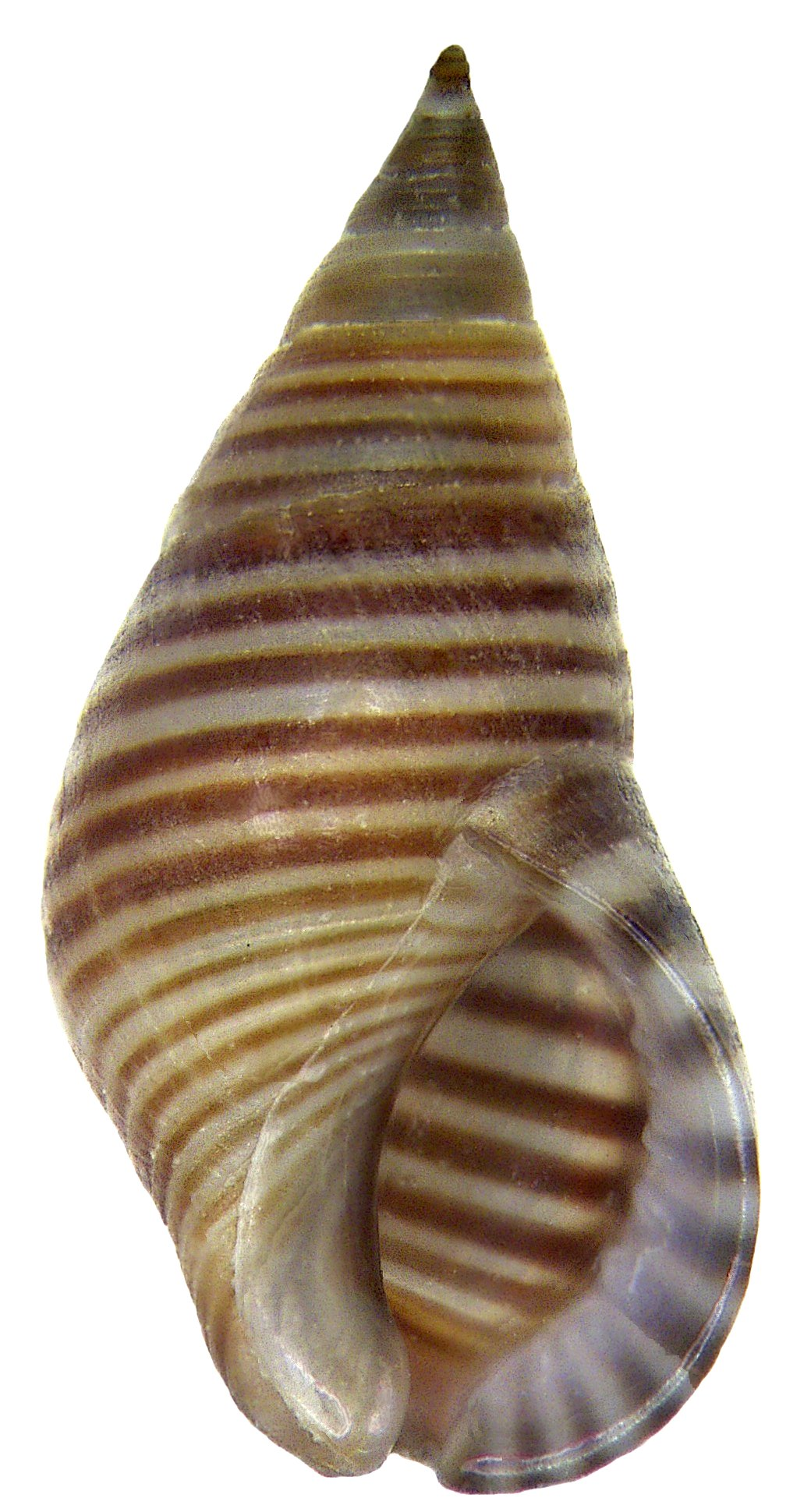
- Hinea fasciata shell

Scientific classification
- Kingdom: Animalia
- Phylum: Mollusca
- Class: Gastropoda
- Subclass: Caenogastropoda
- Order: incertae sedis
- Family: Planaxidae
- Genus: Hinea
- Species: H. fasciata

Binomial name
- Hinea fasciata (Pease, 1868)

Synonyms
- Angiola fasciata (Pease, 1868); Planaxis fasciatus Pease, 1868 (basionym); Planaxis lineatus (da Costa, 1778); Planaxis lineolatus Gould, 1849

= Hinea fasciata =

Species of gastropod

Hinea fasciata is a species of sea snail, a marine gastropod mollusc in the family Planaxidae.

== Distribution ==
This marine species occurs off the coast of South Africa and the Tuamotu Islands.
