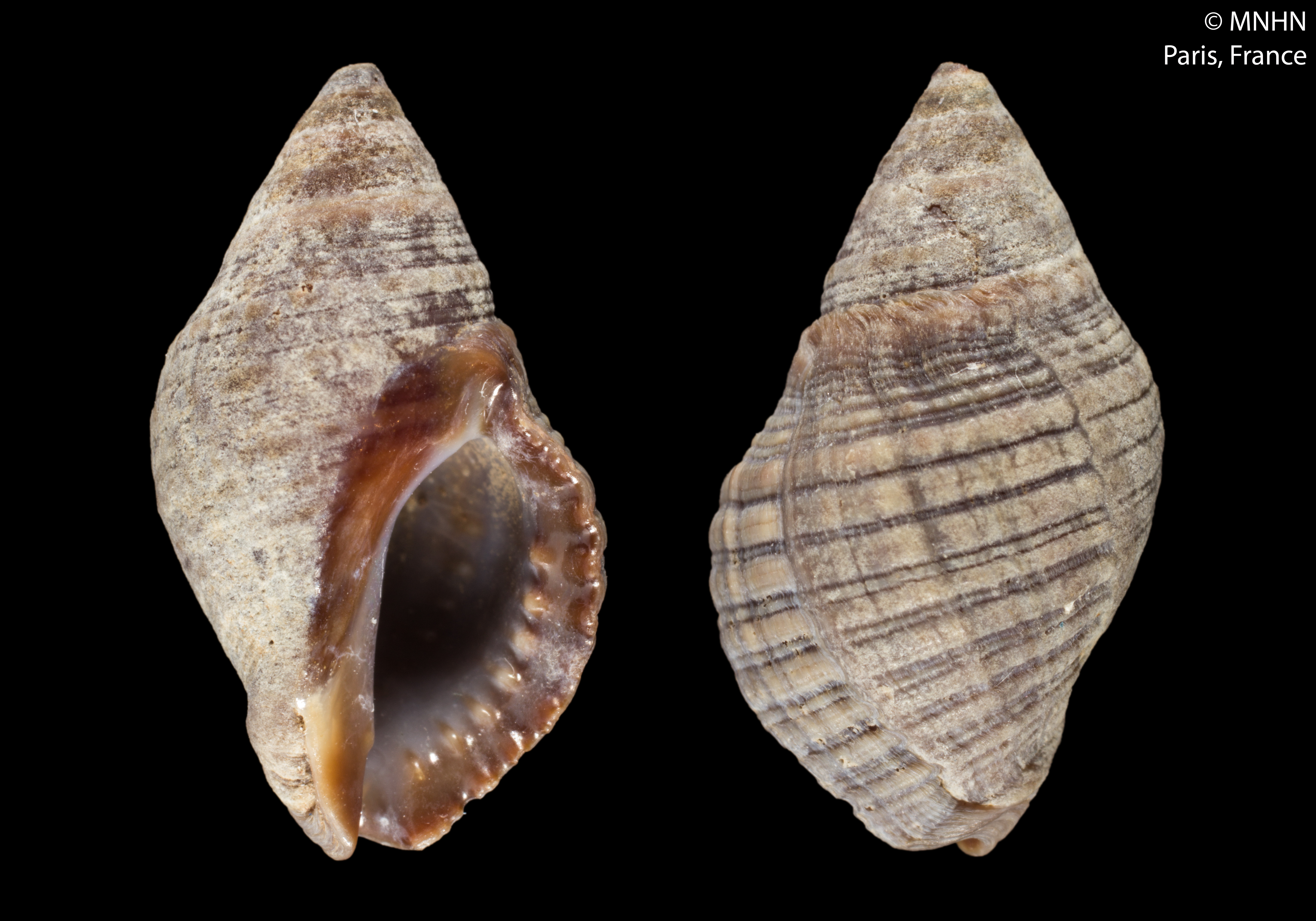
- Shell of Usilla avenacea (syntype at MNHN, Paris)

Scientific classification
- Kingdom: Animalia
- Phylum: Mollusca
- Class: Gastropoda
- Subclass: Caenogastropoda
- Order: Neogastropoda
- Family: Muricidae
- Subfamily: Ergalataxinae
- Genus: Usilla
- Species: U. avenacea

Binomial name
- Usilla avenacea (Lesson, 1842)

Synonyms
- Buccinum avenacea Lesson, 1842; Cronia (Usilla) avenacea (Lesson, 1842); Cronia avenacea (Lesson, 1842); Planaxis cingulata Gould, 1861; Planaxis gouldii Smith, 1872; Purpura avenacea Lesson, 1842 (original combination); Purpura leucostoma Deshayes, 1863; Purpura variabilis Deshayes, 1863; Vexilla fusconigra Pease, 1860; Vexilla variabilis (Deshayes, 1863)

= Usilla avenacea =

Species of gastropod

Usilla avenacea is a species of sea snail, a marine gastropod mollusk in the family Muricidae, the murex snails or rock snails.

== Description ==
(Described as Vexilla fusconigra) The shell is abbreviately fusiform, ventricose, solid. The spire is moderately produced, acute, and less than half the length of the shell. The shell contains six whorls, convex, furnished with close transverse granular ribs. The suture is impressed. The body whorl is large, ventricose, and marked with coarse, remote, revolving impressed lines, and fine longitudinal striae and wrinkles. The siphonal canal is short and slightly recurved. The aperture is oblong-ovate. The outer lip is thick, somewhat dilated, and furnished with six or seven intramarginal tubercular teeth, sinuated at its junction with the body whorl. The columella-lip is smooth, flattened, slightly callous above.

The colour of the shell is black or brownish-black. The impressed lines on the body-whorl have a light chocolate colour. The lips are purplish-brown. The teeth are white or bluish.

Animal. — The foot is oblong, truncated in front and rounded behind. The tentacles taper cylindrically. The eyes are lateral and sessile, at about two-thirds of the length of the tentacles. The siphon is long. Colour of the animal: dark greenisb-slate, and closely punctured with black and white. The tentacles are zoned with brown. The tips are white.

== Distribution ==
This marine species occurs off French Polynesia and Hawaii.
