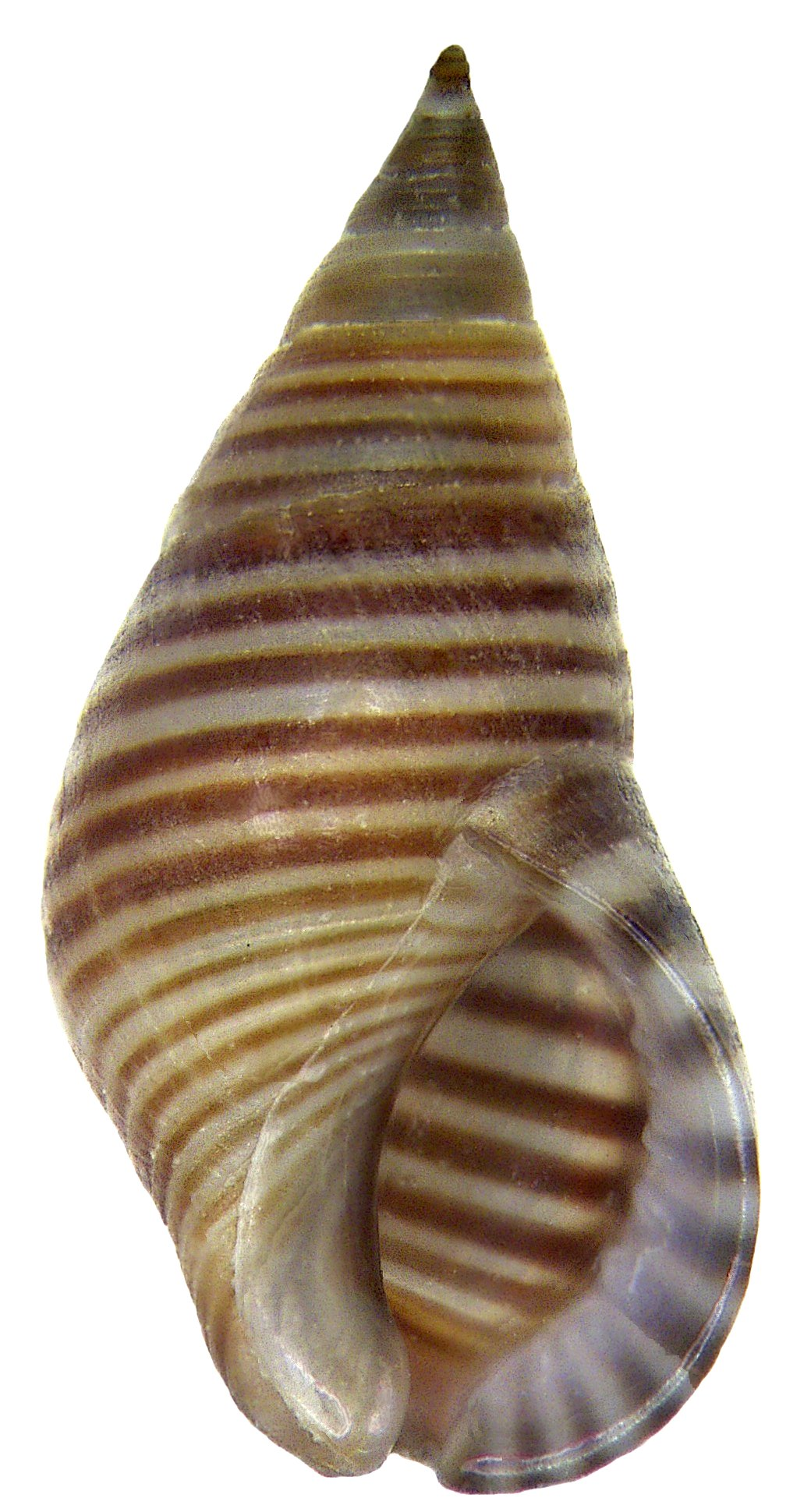
- An apertural view of a shell of Angiola fasciata.

Scientific classification
- Kingdom: Animalia
- Phylum: Mollusca
- Class: Gastropoda
- Subclass: Caenogastropoda
- Order: incertae sedis
- Superfamily: Cerithioidea
- Family: Planaxidae; Gray, 1850

= Planaxidae =

Planaxidae Temporal range: Cretaceous(?) - Recent

Family of gastropods

Planaxidae, commonly called planaxids or clusterwinks, are a taxonomic family of small and minute sea snails, pantropical marine gastropod molluscs in the superfamily Cerithioidea. They live on rocky shores in the littoral zone of the tropics and subtropics.

== Characteristics ==
Planaxids are known as clusterwinks because of their habit of clustering together in concealed, moist locations when the tide is out. They have conical shells resembling periwinkles, except for the wide, shallow anterior canals. They brood their embryos in a chamber behind their heads, releasing them into the sea as veliger larvae to form part of the plankton.

== Subfamilies ==
The following two subfamilies are recognized in the taxonomy of Bouchet & Rocroi (2005):

- Planaxinae Gray, 1850
- Fossarinae A. Adams, 1860 - previously in a family of its own, named Fossaridae

== Genera ==
The family Planaxidae comprises the following genera: The following genera are recognised:

Planaxinae

- † Cabania Lozouet & Senut, 1985
- Fissilabia Macgillivray, 1836
- Halotapada Iredale, 1936
- Hinea Gray, 1847
- Holcostoma H. Adams & A. Adams, 1853
- † Leioplanaxis Lozouet & Maestrati, 1994
- † Orthochilus Cossmann, 1889
- Planaxis Lamarck, 1822
- Simulathena Houbrick, 1992
- Supplanaxis Thiele, 1929

Synonyms

- Angiola Dall, 1926: synonym of Hinea Gray, 1847
- Leucostoma Swainson, 1840: synonym of Fissilabia MacGillivray, 1836 (invalid: junior homonym of Leucostoma Meigen, 1803 [Diptera])
- Quoyia Gray, 1839: synonym of Fissilabia MacGillivray, 1836

Fossarinae

- Anafossarus Iredale, 1936
- Chilkaia Preston, 1915
- Fossarus Philippi, 1841
- Larinopsis J. H. Gatliff & C. J. Gabriel, 1916
- † Medoriopsis Cossmann, 1888
- † Vouastia Raspail, 1909

Synonyms

- Fossar Gray, 1847: synonym of Fossarus Philippi, 1841 (invalid: unjustified emendation of Fossarus)
- Maravignia Aradas & Maggiore, 1844: synonym of Fossarus Philippi, 1841
