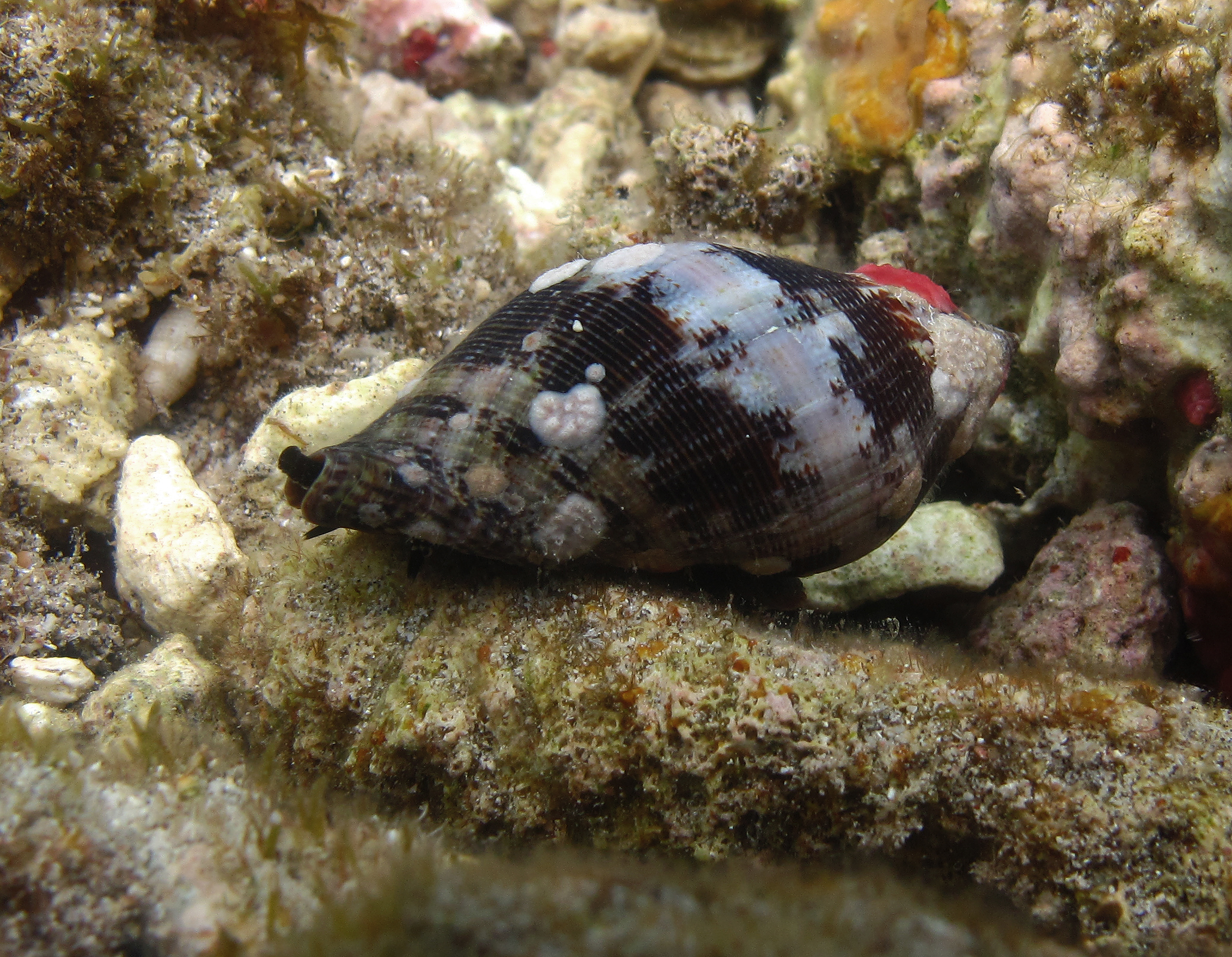
- a live Nassa francolina

Scientific classification
- Kingdom: Animalia
- Phylum: Mollusca
- Class: Gastropoda
- Subclass: Caenogastropoda
- Order: Neogastropoda
- Superfamily: Muricoidea
- Family: Muricidae
- Subfamily: Rapaninae
- Genus: Nassa; Röding, 1798

Type species
- Nassa picta Röding, 1798

Synonyms
- Iopas Adams, 1853; Jopas (incorrect subsequent spelling)

= Nassa (gastropod) =

Genus of gastropods

Nassa is a genus of sea snails, marine gastropod molluscs in the subfamily Rapaninae of the family Muricidae, the murex snails or rock snails.

== Taxonomy ==
The history of the name Nassa is rather confused, because the name was allocated twice:

- Nassa Röding, 1798 for mainly muricid species with the type species : Nassa picta Röding, 1798 (= Nassa serta (Bruguière, 1798).
- Nassa Lamarck, 1799 : established for the species Buccinum mutabile Linnaeus, 1758, which is now classified as a synonym of Nassarius Duméril, 1805 in the family Nassariidae.

In the 19th and much of the 20th century, all species that were added to the genus Nassa were Nassa mud snails belonging to the family Nassariidae. After the rediscovery of Röding's catalogue of his collection Museum Boltenianum sive catalogus cimeliorum e tribus regnis naturæ quæ olim collegerat Joa. Fried Bolten, M. D. p. d. per XL. annos proto physicus Hamburgensis. Pars secunda continens conchylia sive testacea univalvia, bivalvia & multivalvia, the muricid genus Nassa Röding, 1798 was given priority over the genus Nassa named by Lamarck.

Nassa Lamarck was then synonymized with its oldest synonym Nassarius Duméril, 1806 by a ruling of the ICZN Op. 96, Direction 48 (21 Nov 1956) and then to Nassarius (Sphaeronassa) Locard, 1886.

== Description ==
(Described as Iopas) The shell is ovate and rugose. The body whorl is large. The spire is acuminate. The aperture is moderate, emarginate and channelled in front. The inner lip is covered with a thin enamel, and with a prominent plait-like callosity at the hind part. The columella is rounded and subtruncate anteriorly. The outer lip is sinuous and crenate internally.

== Species ==
Species within the genus Nassa include:

- Nassa francolina (Bruguière, 1789)
- † Nassa nordenskjoeldi Steinmann & Wilckens, 1908
- Nassa serta (Bruguière, 1789)
- Nassa situla (Reeve, 1846)
- Nassa tuamotuensis Houart, 1996

Species based on Nassa Röding brought into synonymy

- Nassa francolinus (Bruguière, 1789): synonym of Nassa francolina (Bruguière, 1789)
- Nassa hepatica (Pulteney, 1799): synonym of Nassarius hepaticus (Pulteney, 1799)
- Nassa ligata Röding, 1798: synonym of Nucella lapillus (Linnaeus, 1758)
- Nassa lunata Say, 1826: synonym of Astyris lunata (Say, 1826)
- Nassa molliana Chemnitz, 1780: synonym of Babylonia valentiana (Swainson, 1822)
- Nassa picta Röding, 1798: synonym of Nassa serta (Bruguière, 1789)
- Nassa rudis Roding, 1798: synonym of Nucella lapillus (Linnaeus, 1758)
- Nassa subcancellata Turton, 1932: synonym of Aesopus angustus Lussi, 2001
- Nassa varians Dunker, 1860: synonym of Mitrella bicincta (Gould, 1860)

Species based on Nassa Lamarck brought into synonymy

- Nassa costulata (Renieri, 1804): synonym of Nassarius cuvierii (Payraudeau, 1826)
- Nassa granum: synonym of Nassarius grana (Lamarck, 1822)
- Nassa kraussiana Dunker, 1846: synonym of Nassarius kraussianus (Dunker, 1846)
- Nassa lathraia: synonym of Nassarius sinusigerus (A. Adams, 1852)
- Nassa miser (Dall, 1908): synonym of Nassarius coppingeri (E.A. Smith, 1881)
- Nassa munda: synonym of Nassarius idyllius (Melvill & Standen, 1901)
- Nassa obockensis: synonym of Nassarius deshayesianus (Issel, 1866)
- Nassa optima G.B. Sowerby III, 1903: synonym of Nassarius optimus (G.B. Sowerby III, 1903)
- Nassa pagoda (Reeve, 1844): synonym of Nassarius pagodus (Reeve, 1844)
- Nassa pulla (Linnaeus, 1758): synonym of Nassarius pullus (Linnaeus, 1758)
- Nassa semistriata: synonym of † Nassarius semistriatus (Brocchi, 1814)
- Nassa steindachneri: synonym of Nassarius siquijorensis (A. Adams, 1852)
- Nassa stiphra: synonym of Nassarius agapetus (Watson, 1882)
- Nassa tegula Reeve, 1853: synonym of Nassarius striatus (C.B. Adams, 1852)
- Nassa xesta: synonym of Nassarius comptus (A. Adams, 1852)
