= Buccinum golikovi =

Scientific classification
- Kingdom: Animalia
- Phylum: Mollusca
- Class: Gastropoda
- Subclass: Caenogastropoda
- Order: Neogastropoda
- Family: Buccinidae
- Genus: Buccinum
- Species: B. golikovi

Binomial name
- Buccinum golikovi Kantor, Sirenko, Zvonareva & Fedosov, 2022

Synonyms
- Buccinum coronatum A. N. Golikov, 1980 (invalid: junior homonym of Buccinum coronatum Bruguière, 1789, Gmelin, 1791, and B. coronatum Quoy & Gaimard, 1833; Buccinum golikovi is a replacement name)

Species of gastropod

Buccinum golikovi is a species of sea snail, a marine gastropod mollusk in the family Buccinidae, the true whelks.

== Nomenclature ==
The species Buccinum coronatum Golikov, 1980, is valid, but the name is preoccupied several times. The name is thus invalid.

- Buccinum coronatum Bruguière, 1789: synonym of Nassarius coronatus (Bruguière, 1789)
- Buccinum coronatum Gmelin, 1791: synonym of Nassa serta (Bruguière, 1789)
- Buccinum coronatum Quoy & Gaimard, 1833: synonym of Nassarius distortus (A. Adams, 1852)
