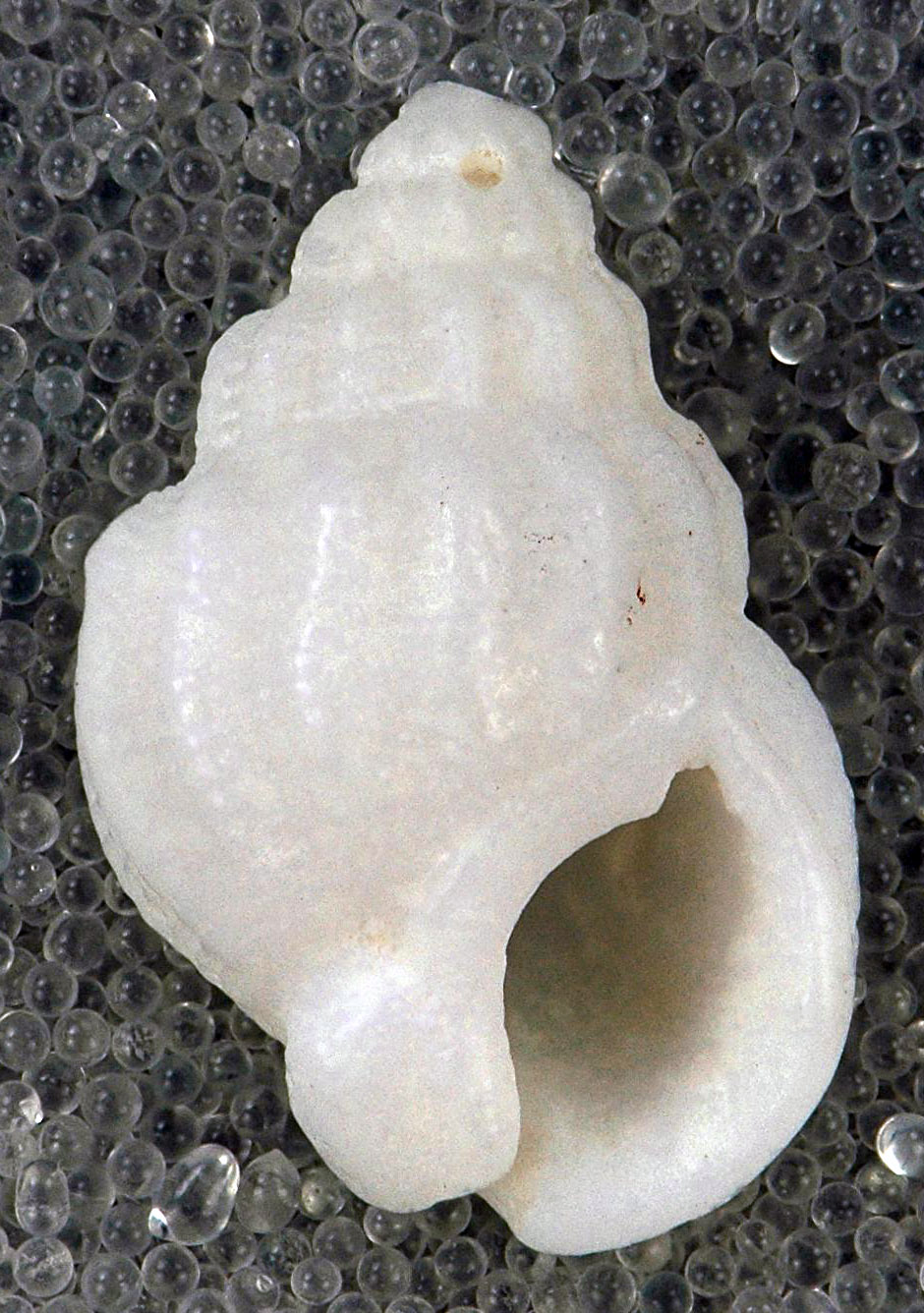
- Phrontis alba shell

Scientific classification
- Kingdom: Animalia
- Phylum: Mollusca
- Class: Gastropoda
- Subclass: Caenogastropoda
- Order: Neogastropoda
- Family: Nassariidae
- Genus: Phrontis
- Species: P. alba

Binomial name
- Phrontis alba (Say, 1826)

Synonyms
- Nassa alba Say, 1826; Nassa annelifera Reeve, 1853; Nassa candei d'Orbigny in Sagra, 1843; Nassa clathratula A. Adams, 1852; Nassa obtusata A. Adams, 1852; Nassa pura Marrat, 1877; Nassa quinquecostata Marrat, 1880; † Nassarius (Uzita) floridensis Olsson, A.A. & A. Harbison, 1953; Nassarius (Uzita) albus (Say, 1826); Uzita alba (Say, 1826)

= Phrontis alba =

Species of gastropod

Phrontis alba, common name the variable dog whelk, is a species of sea snail, a marine gastropod mollusk in the family Nassariidae, the Nassa mud snails or dog whelks.

The variety Nassarius albus var. nanus Nowell-Usticke, 1959 is a synonym of Phrontis karinae Nowell-Usticke, 1971

== Description ==
The length of the shell varies between 6 mm and 13 mm.

== Distribution ==
This species occurs in the Gulf of Mexico, the Caribbean Sea, the Lesser Antilles; in the Atlantic Ocean from North Carolina, USA to Brazil.
