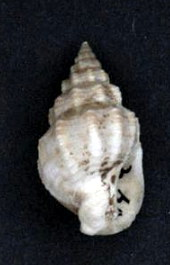
- Apertural view of a shell of Phrontis pagoda (museum specimen at Naturalis Biodiversity Center)

Scientific classification
- Kingdom: Animalia
- Phylum: Mollusca
- Class: Gastropoda
- Subclass: Caenogastropoda
- Order: Neogastropoda
- Superfamily: Buccinoidea
- Family: Nassariidae
- Genus: Phrontis; H. Adams & A. Adams, 1853

Type species
- Buccinum tiarula Kiener, 1841

Species
- See text

Synonyms
- Alectrion (Phrontis) H. Adams & A. Adams, 1853; Alectryon (Phrontis) H. Adams & A. Adams, 1853; Nassa (Phrontis) H. Adams & A. Adams, 1853; Nassarius (Phrontis) H. Adams & A. Adams, 1853

= Phrontis (gastropod) =

Genus of gastropods

Phrontis is a genus of sea snails, marine gastropod mollusks in the subfamily Nassariinae of the family Nassariidae, the Nassa mud snails or dog whelks.

== Description ==
The spire is elevated and acuminate. The whorls are ribbed or nodulose. The inner lip is smooth and has an extended, thickened callus.

== Species ==
Species within the genus Phrontis include:

- Phrontis alba (Say, 1826)
- Phrontis antillara (d'Orbigny, 1847)
- Phrontis candidissima (C. B. Adams, 1845)
- Phrontis complanata (Powys, 1835)
- Phrontis hotessieriana (d'Orbigny, 1842)
- Phrontis karinae (Nowell-Usticke, 1971)
- Phrontis luteostoma (Broderip & G. B. Sowerby I, 1829)
- Phrontis nassiformis (Lesson, 1842)
- Phrontis pagoda (Reeve, 1844)
- Phrontis polygonata (Lamarck, 1822)
- Phrontis tiarula (Kiener, 1841)
- Phrontis versicolor (C. B. Adams, 1852)
- Phrontis vibex (Say, 1822)

Species brought into synonymy

- Phrontis compacta (Angas, 1865): synonym of Reticunassa compacta (Angas, 1865)
- Phrontis crassus (Philippi, 1849): synonym of Nassarius semisulcatus (Hombron & Jacquinot, 1848)
- Phrontis nodicostata (A. Adams, 1852): synonym of Nassarius nodicostatus (A. Adams, 1852)
- Phrontis obockensis Jousseaume, 1888: synonym of Nassarius deshayesianus (Issel, 1866)
