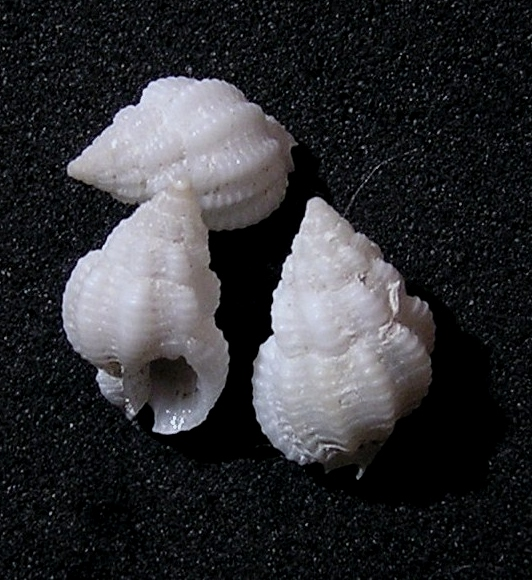
- Several views of a shell of Phrontis antillara

Scientific classification
- Kingdom: Animalia
- Phylum: Mollusca
- Class: Gastropoda
- Subclass: Caenogastropoda
- Order: Neogastropoda
- Family: Nassariidae
- Genus: Phrontis
- Species: P. antillara

Binomial name
- Phrontis antillara (d’Orbigny, 1847)

Synonyms
- Buccinum ambiguum Pulteney, 1799 (original combination); Nassarius ambiguus (Pulteney, 1799); Nassarius (Nassarius) antillarum (d’Orbigny, 1847); Nassarius antillarum (d'Orbigny, 1847)

= Phrontis antillara =

Species of gastropod

Phrontis antillara, common name the Antilles nassa, is a species of sea snail, a marine gastropod mollusk in the family Nassariidae, the Nassa mud snails or dog whelks.

== Description ==
The shell grows to a length of 12 mm.

The small, short shell has a conico-globular shape. Its, color is slightly variable, whitish or reddish, marked with fawn-colored bands or isolated spots of the same color. The spire is composed of six or seven convex whorls, keeled and strongly folded. The whorls are distant and swollen near the suture. It has, also, upon its entire surface, fine and numerous transverse striae. The whitish aperture is suborbicular. The outer lip is margined, marked with brown spots and striated internally. The columella is arcuated. The base of the shell is strongly recurved.

== Distribution ==
This species occurs in the Caribbean Sea, the Gulf of Mexico and the Lesser Antilles; in the Atlantic Ocean off Brazil.
