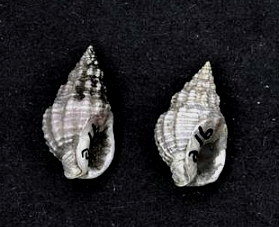
- Two shells of Phrontis vibex (museum specimens at Naturalis Biodiversity Center)

Scientific classification
- Kingdom: Animalia
- Phylum: Mollusca
- Class: Gastropoda
- Subclass: Caenogastropoda
- Order: Neogastropoda
- Family: Nassariidae
- Genus: Phrontis
- Species: P. vibex

Binomial name
- Phrontis vibex (Say, 1822)

Synonyms
- synonymy: Alectrion vibex (Say, 1822); Antillophos candei auct. non d'Orbigny, 1842; Buccinum antillarum Philippi, 1849; Buccinum polygonatum Lamarck, 1822; Buccinum sturmii Philippi, 1849; Buccinum vibex (Say, 1822); Nassa (Phrontis) cinisculus Reeve, 1853; Nassa antillarum d'Orbigny in Sagra, 1843; Nassa cinisculus Reeve, 1853; Nassa fretensis Perkins, 1869; Nassa sturmii (Philippi, 1849); Nassa vibex Say, 1822 (basionym); Nassarius (Nassarius) vibex (Say, 1822); Nassarius vibex (Say, 1822); Uzita vibex (Say, 1822)

= Phrontis vibex =

Species of gastropod

Phrontis vibex, common name the bruised nassa, is a species of sea snail, a marine gastropod mollusk in the family Nassariidae, the Nassa mud snails or dog whelks.

== Description ==
The length of the shell varies from 10 mm to 20 mm. The shell is ovate and conical. The spire comprises six or seven indistinct whorls, subconvex, plaited throughout their length, crossed by fine and very close transverse striae. Those of the base are more prominent. The longitudinal folds disappear insensibly upon the right side of the body whorl, at the upper part of which we find merely nodosities. The whitish aperture is rounded. The cavity has a brown color and is marked by transverse bands. The outer lip is bordered externally and ornamented internally with small, fine striae. The columella is arcuated and is covered with a fairly wide callosity, brown at its upper part and white towards the base, which is adorned with small guttules. The coloring of the shell is olive, with a white or yellowish band. The folds and the tubercles are sometimes whitish on the top of the body whorls.

== Distribution ==
The distribution of Nassarius vibex is from 41.6°N to 27°S; 97.38°W to 34.9°W, the northwest Atlantic, Gulf of Mexico, Caribbean Sea, and southwest Atlantic.

This marine species occurs off the following countries:

- USA: Massachusetts, New York, New Jersey, Virginia, North Carolina, South Carolina, Georgia, Florida: East Florida, West Florida; Louisiana, Texas
- Mexico: Tabasco, Veracruz, Campeche State, Yucatán State, Quintana Roo
- Nicaragua
- Lesser Antilles
- Costa Rica
- Cuba
- Panama
- Colombia
- Venezuela: Gulf of Venezuela
- Jamaica
- Virgin Islands: St. Croix
- Brazil: Para, Maranhao, Ceara, Rio Grande do Norte, Pernambuco, Alagoas, Bahia, Rio de Janeiro, São Paulo, Parana and Santa Catarina.
