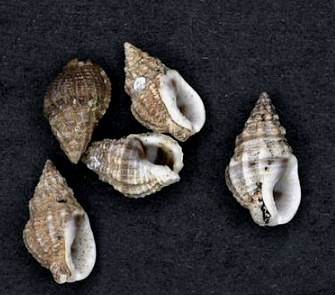
- A collection of shells of Phrontis polygonata (museum specimens at Naturalis Biodiversity Center)

Scientific classification
- Kingdom: Animalia
- Phylum: Mollusca
- Class: Gastropoda
- Subclass: Caenogastropoda
- Order: Neogastropoda
- Family: Nassariidae
- Genus: Phrontis
- Species: P. polygonata

Binomial name
- Phrontis polygonata (Lamarck, 1822)

Synonyms
- Nassarius polygonatus (Lamarck, 1822); Nassarius (Nassarius) vibex polygonatus (f) (Lamarck, 1822)

= Phrontis polygonata =

Species of gastropod

Phrontis polygonata is a species of sea snail, a marine gastropod mollusk in the family Nassariidae, the Nassa mud snails or dog whelks.

== Description ==
The shell grows to a length of 17 mm.

== Distribution ==
This species occurs in the Caribbean Sea, the Gulf of Mexico, and the Lesser Antilles.
