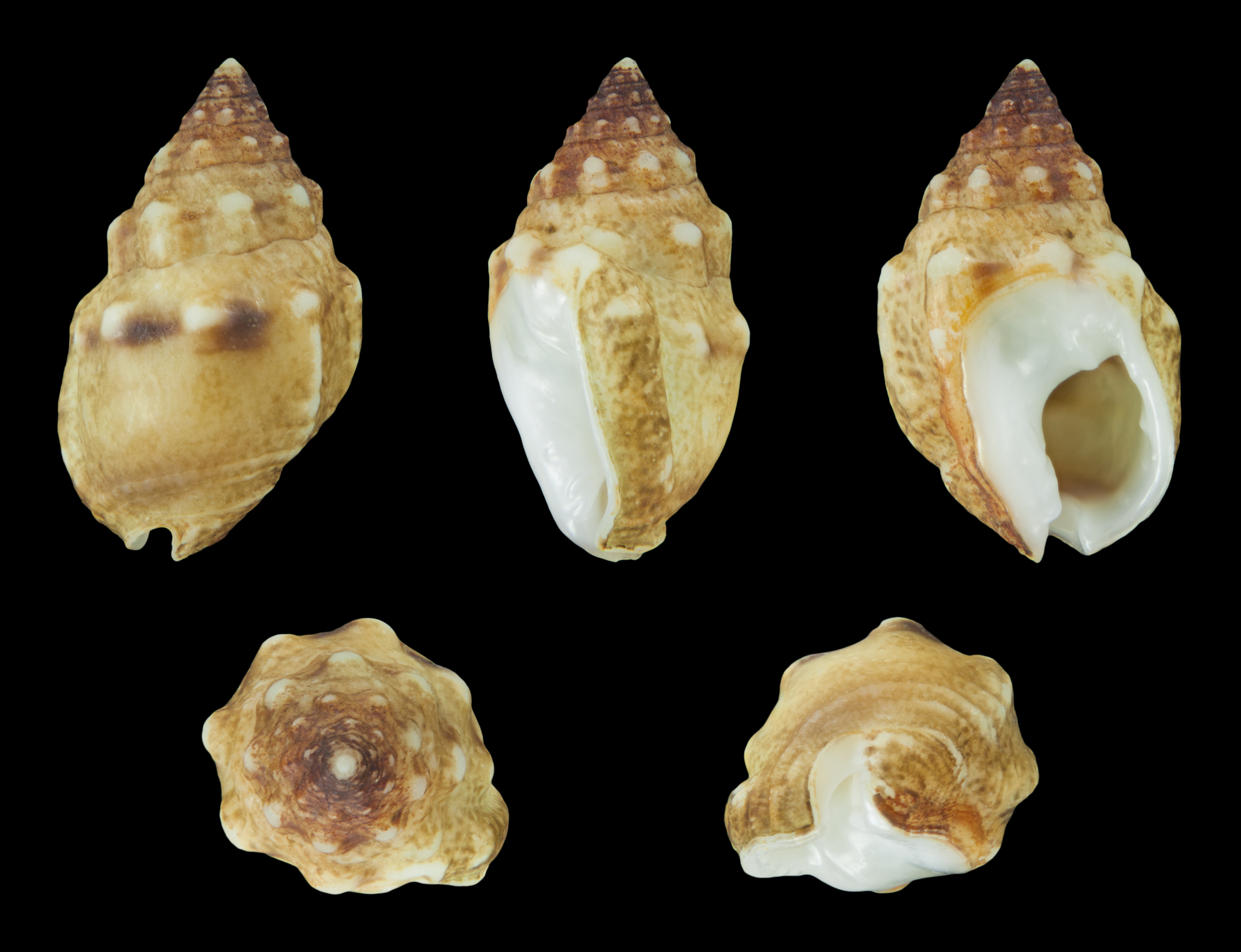

Scientific classification
- Kingdom: Animalia
- Phylum: Mollusca
- Class: Gastropoda
- Subclass: Caenogastropoda
- Order: Neogastropoda
- Family: Nassariidae
- Genus: Phrontis
- Species: P. tiarula

Binomial name
- Phrontis tiarula (Kiener, 1841)

Synonyms
- Buccinum tiarula Kiener, 1841; Nassa complanata var. major Stearns, 1894; Nassa tegula Reeve, 1853; Nassa tiarula (Kiener, 1841); Nassarius (Nassarius) tiarula (Kiener, 1841)

= Phrontis tiarula =

Species of gastropod

Phrontis tiarula, common name the western mud nassa, is a species of small sea snail with gills and an operculum, a marine gastropod mollusc in the family Nassariidae, the nassa mud snails or dog whelks.

== Description ==
The length of the shell varies between 9 mm and 20 mm.

== Distribution ==
This species occurs in the Pacific Ocean from California to Mexico.

== Feeding habits ==
These snails are exclusively scavengers.
