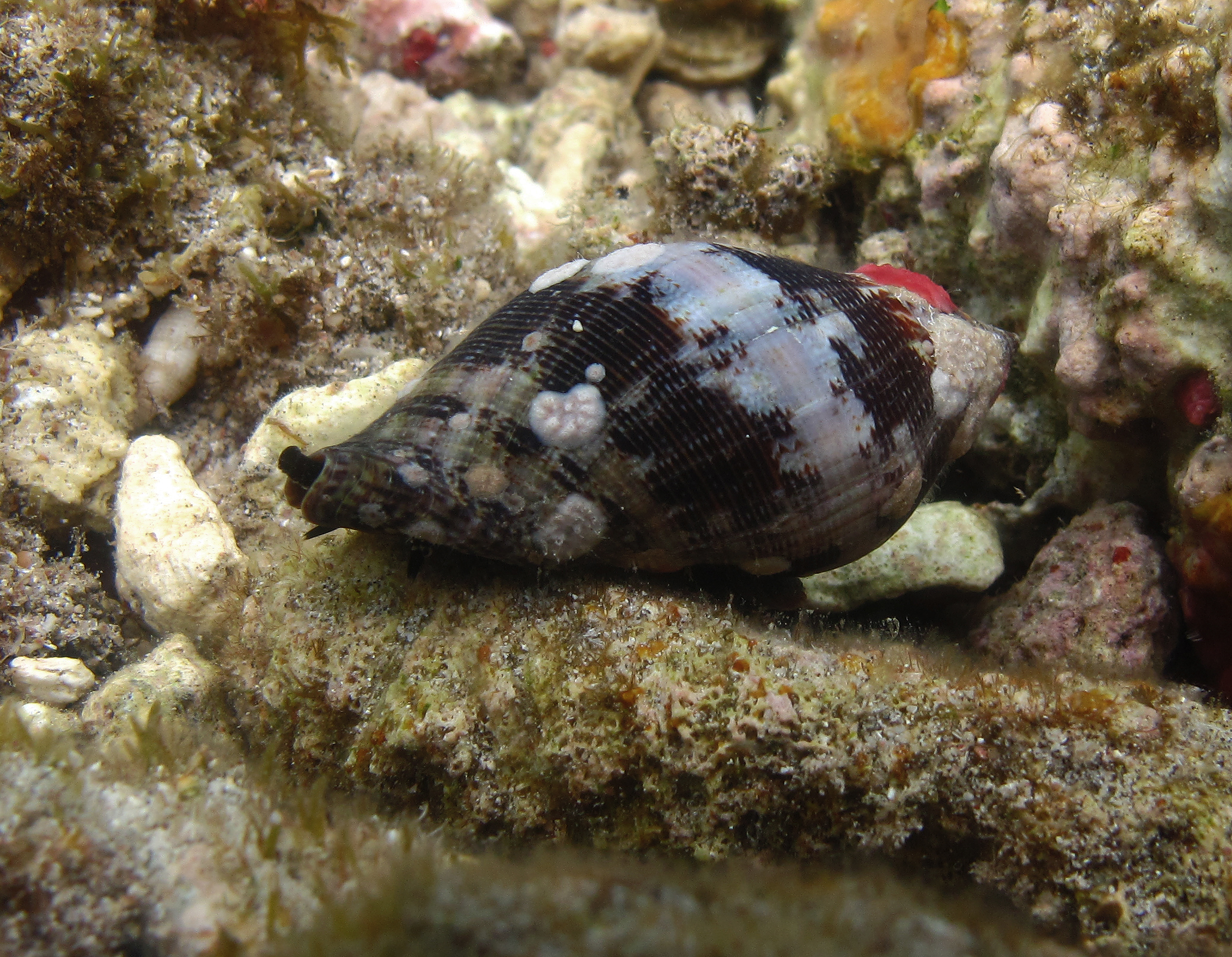
- Nassa francolina in situ

Scientific classification
- Kingdom: Animalia
- Phylum: Mollusca
- Class: Gastropoda
- Subclass: Caenogastropoda
- Order: Neogastropoda
- Family: Muricidae
- Genus: Nassa
- Species: N. francolina

Binomial name
- Nassa francolina (Bruguière, 1789)

Synonyms
- Buccinum francolinus Bruguière, 1789; Nassa francolinus (Bruguière, 1789)

= Nassa francolina =

Species of gastropod

Nassa francolina, the francolina jopas, is a species of sea snail, a marine gastropod mollusc in the family Nassariidae, the nassa mud snails.

== Distribution ==
This species occurs in the Indian Ocean off the Aldabra Atoll, Chagos and the Mascarene Basin and in the Pacific Ocean off Western Australia and Papua New Guinea.

== Description ==
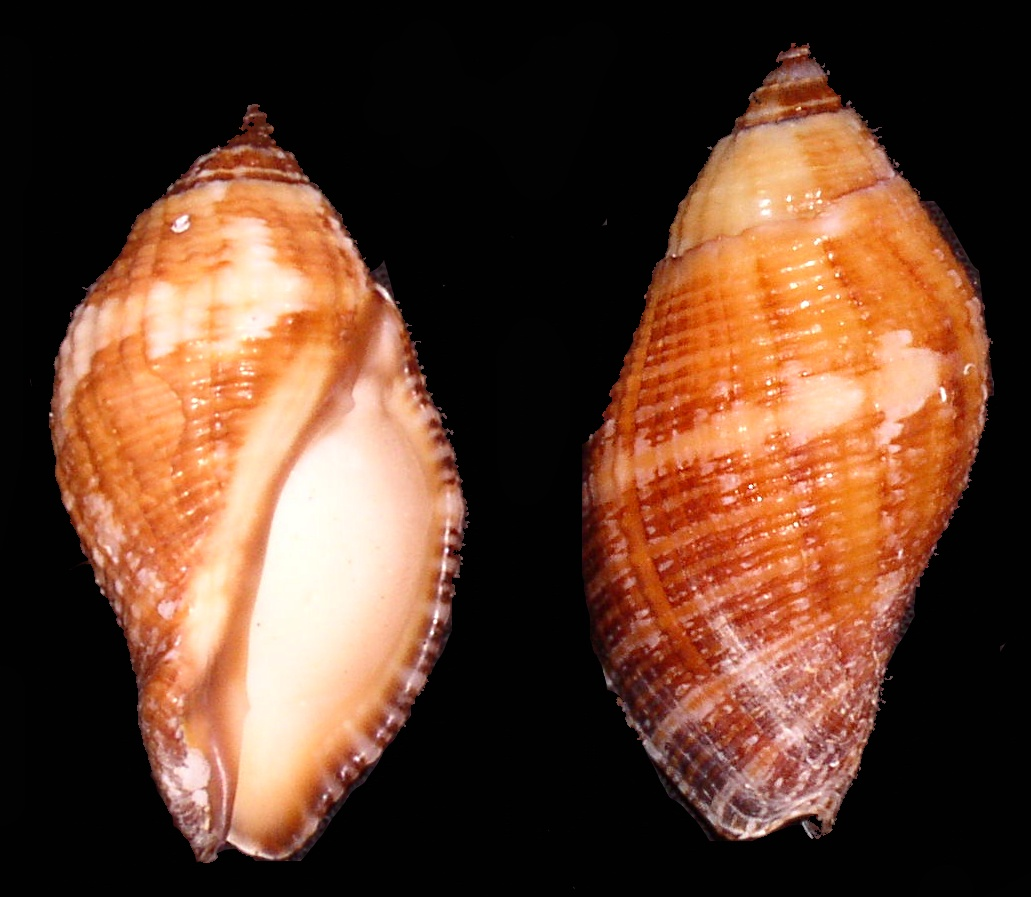
Nassa francolina shell

The length of the shell varies between 33 mm and 70 mm.
