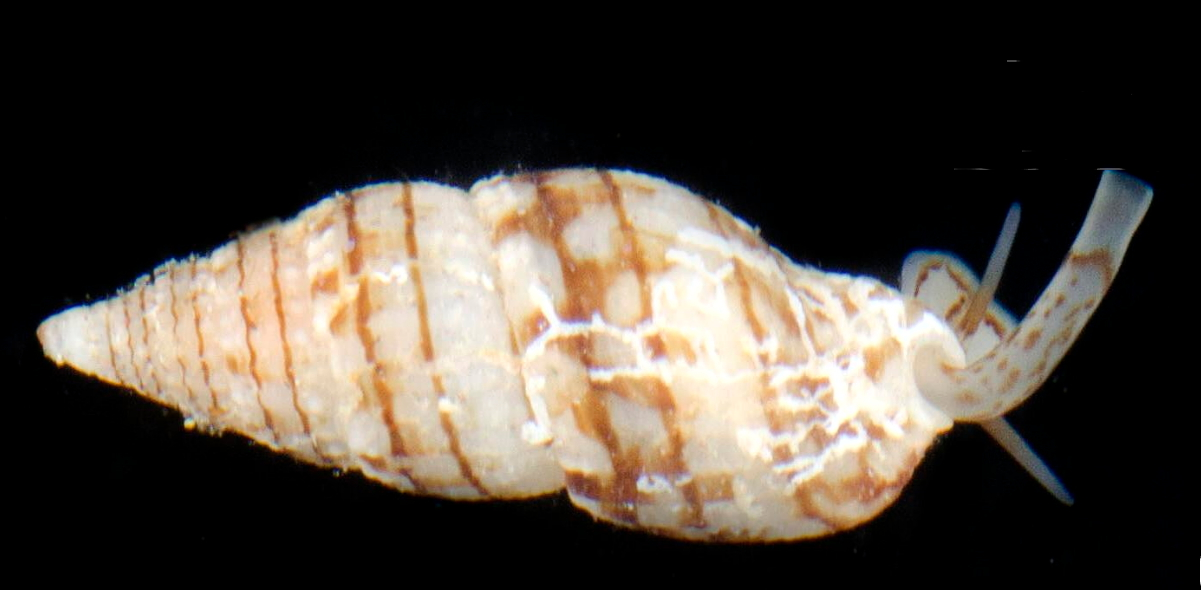
- Shell of Nassa tuamotuensis (specimen at the Smithsonian Institution)

Scientific classification
- Kingdom: Animalia
- Phylum: Mollusca
- Class: Gastropoda
- Subclass: Caenogastropoda
- Order: Neogastropoda
- Family: Muricidae
- Genus: Nassa
- Species: N. tuamotuensis

Binomial name
- Nassa tuamotuensis Houart, 1996

Synonyms
- Purpura francolinus Kiener, 1835

= Nassa tuamotuensis =

Species of gastropod

Nassa tuamotuensis is a species of sea snail, a marine gastropod mollusc in the family Muricidae.

== Description ==
The shell size varies between 24 mm and 64 mm.

== Distribution ==
This species is distributed in the Pacific Ocean along the Cook Islands and Tuamotus and the Society Islands.
