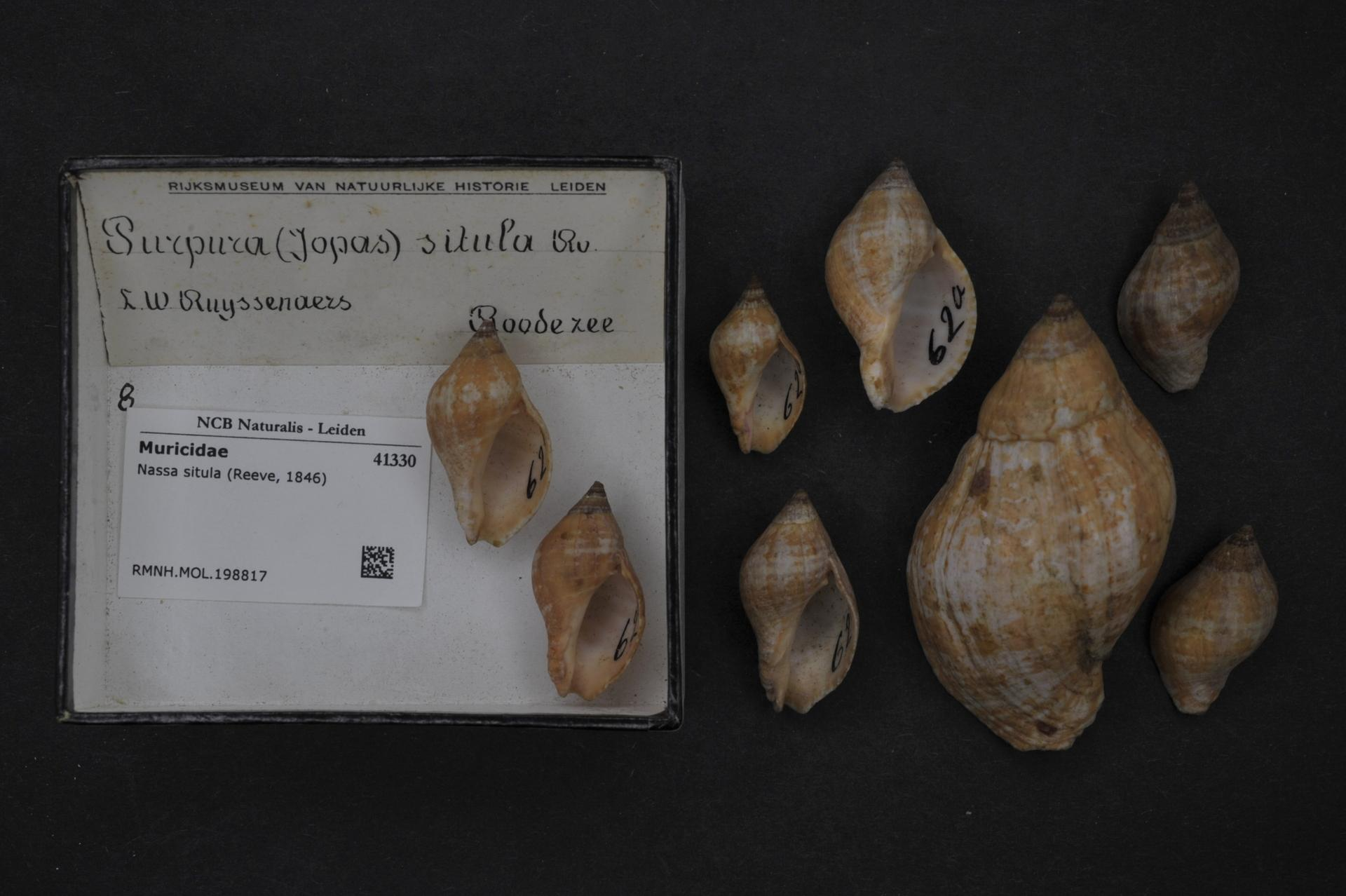
- Nassa situla shells

Scientific classification
- Kingdom: Animalia
- Phylum: Mollusca
- Class: Gastropoda
- Subclass: Caenogastropoda
- Order: Neogastropoda
- Family: Muricidae
- Genus: Nassa
- Species: N. situla

Binomial name
- Nassa situla (Reeve, 1846)

Synonyms
- Buccinum situlum Reeve, 1846; Iopas situla (Reeve, 1846); Pusio kossmanni Pagenstecher, 1877; Pusio savignyi Pagenstecher, A., 1877

= Nassa situla =

Species of gastropod

Nassa situla is a species of sea snail, a marine gastropod mollusc in the family Muricidae.

== Description ==
The shell grows to a length of 35 mm

== Distribution ==
This species is distributed in the Red Sea, the Gulf of Aden and the Gulf of Oman. Nassa situla was introduced to Israel, but there is no evidence of impact.
