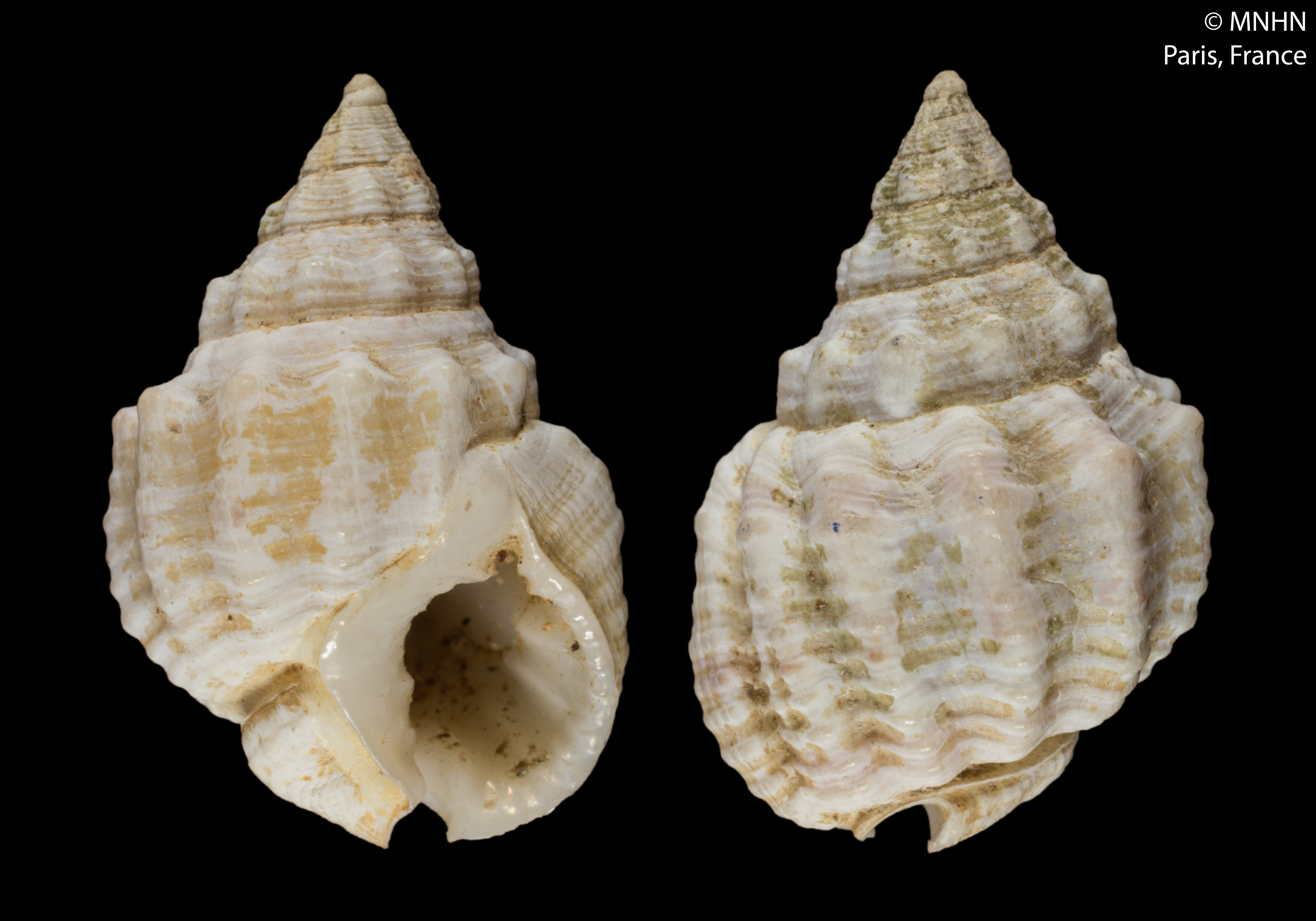

Scientific classification
- Kingdom: Animalia
- Phylum: Mollusca
- Class: Gastropoda
- Subclass: Caenogastropoda
- Order: Neogastropoda
- Family: Nassariidae
- Genus: Phrontis
- Species: P. nassiformis

Binomial name
- Phrontis nassiformis (Lesson, 1842)

Synonyms
- Cancellaria nassiformis Lesson, 1842 (original combination); Nassa corpulenta C. B. Adams, 1852; Nassa polygonata Reeve, 1853; Nassa rufolineata Marrat, 1880; Nassarius corpulentus (C. B. Adams, 1852); Nassarius nassiformis (Lesson, 1842)

= Phrontis nassiformis =

Species of gastropod

Phrontis nassiformis is a species of sea snail, a marine gastropod mollusk in the family Cancellariidae, the nutmeg snails.

== Distribution ==
This species occurs in the Pacific Ocean off Mexico and the Galapagos Islands.
