= Nassarius agapetus =

Scientific classification
- Kingdom: Animalia
- Phylum: Mollusca
- Class: Gastropoda
- Subclass: Caenogastropoda
- Order: Neogastropoda
- Family: Nassariidae
- Genus: Nassarius
- Species: N. agapetus

Binomial name
- Nassarius agapetus (Watson, 1882)

Synonyms
- Nassa (Niotha) agapeta Watson, 1882; Nassa agapeta Watson, 1882; Nassa kempi Preston, 1916; Nassa stiphra Sturany, 1900

Species of gastropod

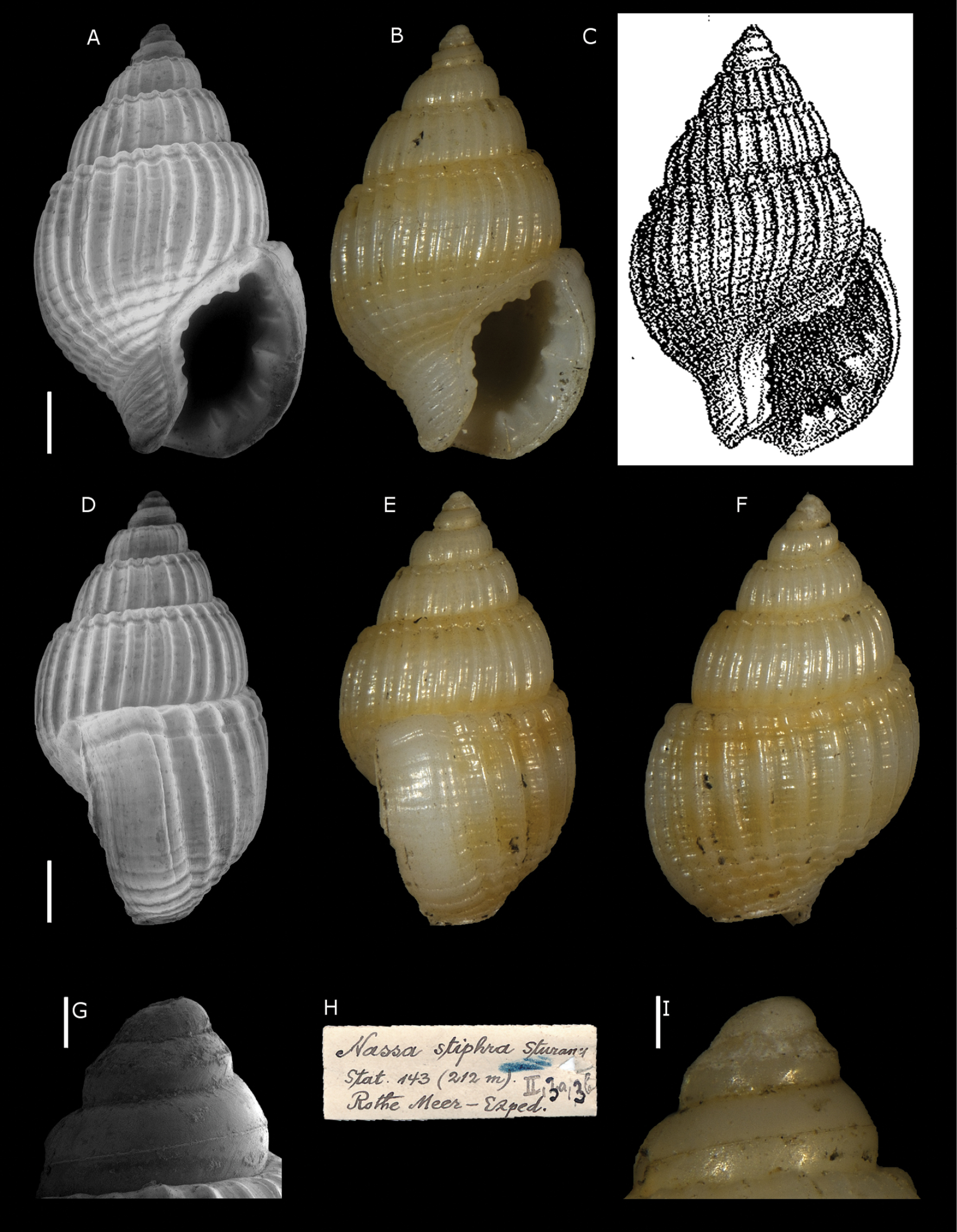

Nassarius agapetus is a species of sea snail, a marine gastropod mollusc in the family Nassariidae, the nassa mud snails or dog whelks.

== Description ==
The length of the shell attains 6.5 mm.

== Distribution ==
This species is distributed in the Red Sea, in the Indian Ocean off Réunion and in the Indo-West Pacific.
