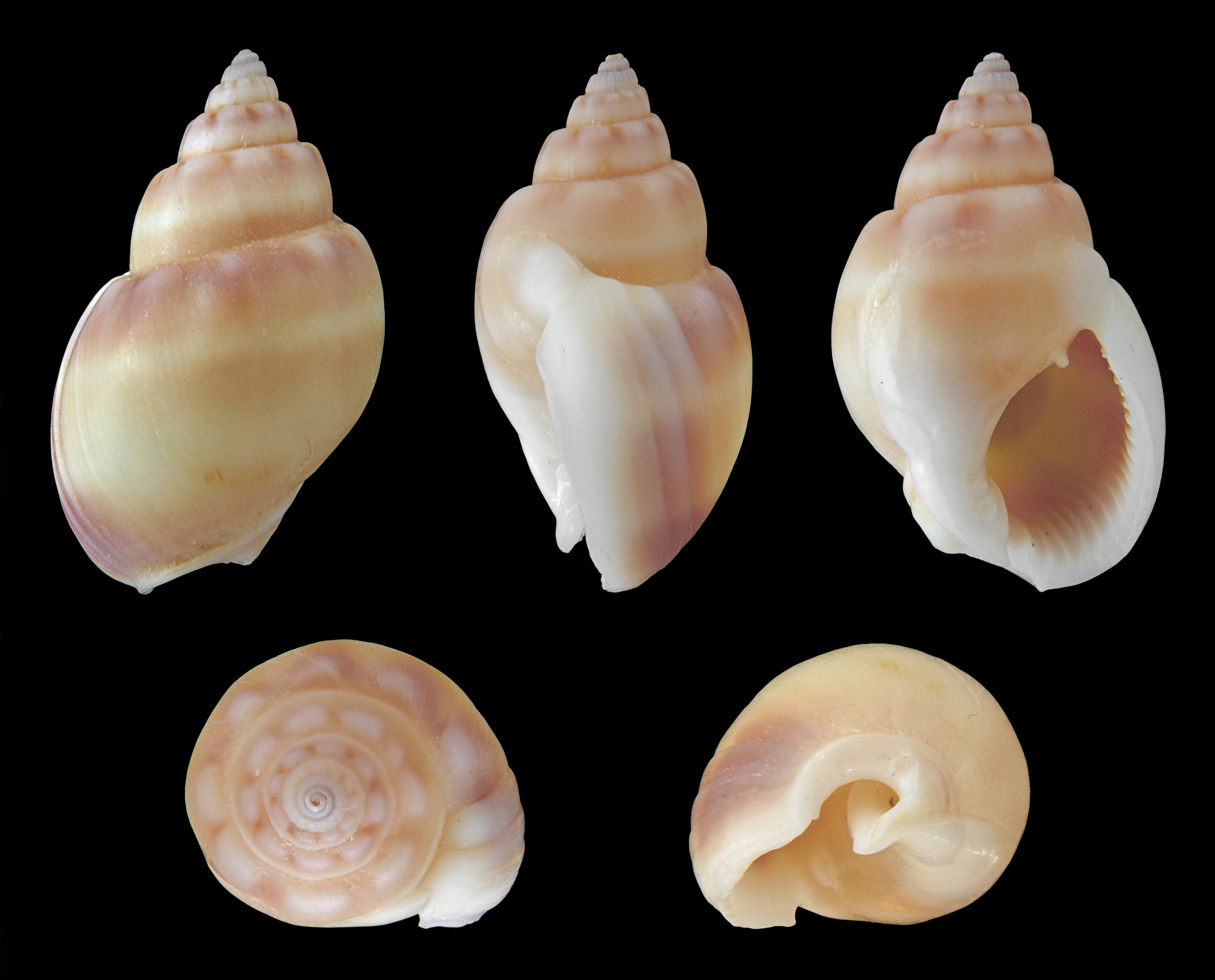

Scientific classification
- Kingdom: Animalia
- Phylum: Mollusca
- Class: Gastropoda
- Subclass: Caenogastropoda
- Order: Neogastropoda
- Family: Nassariidae
- Genus: Nassarius
- Species: N. coronatus

Binomial name
- Nassarius coronatus (Bruguière, 1789)

Synonyms
- Buccinum bronnii Philippi, 1849; Buccinum coronatum Bruguière, 1798; Nassa coronata (Bruguière, 1798); Nassa coronata var. minor Dautzenberg, 1923; Nassarius bronni Philippi, R.A., 1849; Nassarius (Nassarius) coronatus (Bruguière, 1789)

= Nassarius coronatus =

Species of gastropod

Nassarius coronatus, common name the crown nassa or the coronated dog whelk, is a species of sea snail, a marine gastropod mollusc in the family Nassariidae, the Nassa mud snails or dog whelks.

== Description ==
The length of the shell varies between 18 mm and 35 mm. It is similar to Nassarius arcularia plicatus, but has a more elongated spire, a smooth surface and less flaring columella. The aperture is dark brown with a light band.

The ovate shell is inflated, smooth and polished. The shell is of a variable color, bluish ash, reddish or brown, covered with narrow, white, longitudinal lines, irregularly spread over it. A deeper zone surrounds the suture, and two or three others are found upon the body whorl, that of the middle much more marked, and sometimes the only one. The spire is composed of six convex whorls, slightly flattened at their upper part, and crowned by a row of rounded tubercles. The three or four upper whorls are folded longitudinally, and intersected by transverse striae. The aperture is ovate, notched at the top of the outer lip, with a ridge upon the inner lip. The depth of the cavity is brown, and marked with a whitish band. The outer lip is thin upon the edge, crowned throughout its whole length with small, short, and pointed denticulations, furnished internally with numerous transverse striae. The columella is arcuated, covered by the inner lip which extends upon the body of the body whorl in a white, rather thick callosity, loaded towards the base with some slightly apparent guttules, and terminated by small spinous points.

== Distribution ==
This species can be found on shallow sands in the Red Sea and the Gulf of Oman; in the Indo-Pacific off Aldabra, the east coast of South Africa, Kenya, Madagascar, the Mascarene Basin, Mauritius, Mozambique and Tanzania; off Indonesia, the Philippines, Japan, the Solomon Islands and Australia (Northern Territory, Queensland, Western Australia).
