= Nassa serta =

Scientific classification
- Kingdom: Animalia
- Phylum: Mollusca
- Class: Gastropoda
- Subclass: Caenogastropoda
- Order: Neogastropoda
- Family: Muricidae
- Genus: Nassa
- Species: N. serta

Binomial name
- Nassa serta (Bruguière, 1789)

Synonyms
- Buccinum coronatum Gmelin, 1791; Buccinum sertum Bruguière, 1789; Iopas hederacea (Schumacher, 1817); Iopas sertum (Bruguière, 1789); Nassa picta Röding, 1798; Stramonita hederacea Schumacher, 1817

Species of gastropod

Nassa serta, commonly known as the sertum rock shell, is a species of sea snail in the family Muricidae. It was originally described by Bruguière in 1789 and has undergone several taxonomic revisions.

== Description ==
The shell of Nassa serta varies in size from 38 mm to 70 mm. It is robust and elongated, with pronounced spiral ridges and axial ribs that give it a textured appearance. The coloration typically ranges from light to dark brown, often with contrasting bands or spots.

== Distribution ==
This species occurs widely across the Indo-Pacific region. It is recorded in the Red Sea, off the coasts of Tanzania, Madagascar and Mauritius, and the Chagos Archipelago, and as far east as Hawaii and Eastern Australia. Records from the Pitcairn Islands and French Polynesia confirm its range extends into the remote Pacific.

== Habitat and Ecology ==
Nassa serta inhabits shallow subtidal zones, typically at depths of 3 to 12 meters. It is commonly found under corals, slabs, and stones in reef-associated environments. Like other muricids, it is a carnivorous or scavenging snail, often feeding on sessile invertebrates or carrion.

== Reproduction ==
This species is a non-broadcast spawner, meaning it does not release eggs freely into the water column. Fertilization is internal, and eggs are laid in capsules attached to hard surfaces. Its development bypasses the trochophore stage, instead producing veliger larvae or juveniles directly.
