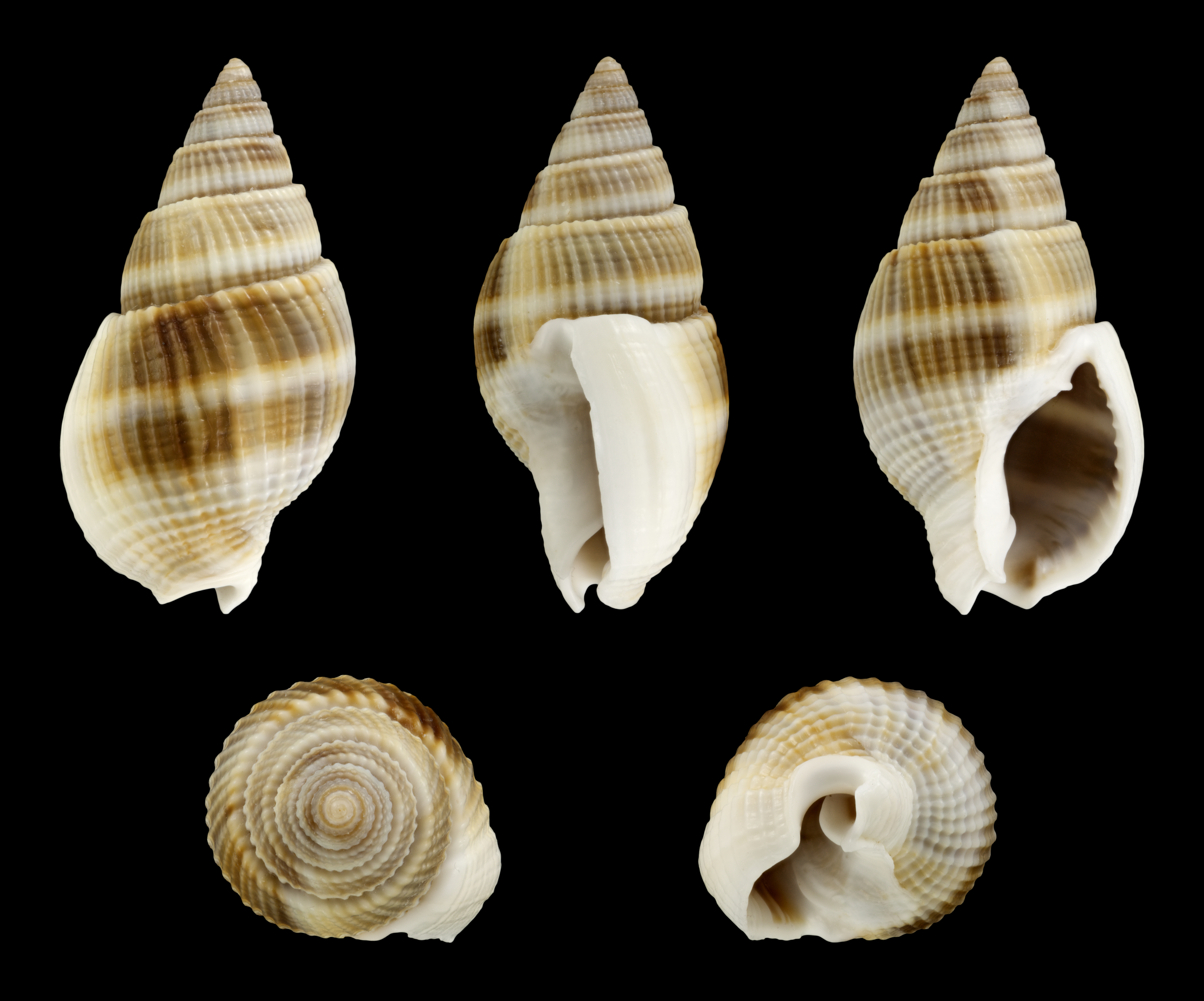

Scientific classification
- Kingdom: Animalia
- Phylum: Mollusca
- Class: Gastropoda
- Subclass: Caenogastropoda
- Order: Neogastropoda
- Family: Nassariidae
- Genus: Nassarius
- Species: N. siquijorensis

Binomial name
- Nassarius siquijorensis (A. Adams, 1852)

Synonyms
- Buccinum canaliculatum Lamarck, 1822 (invalid: junior homonym of Buccinum canaliculatum Gmelin, 1791); Buccinum turris Wood, 1825; Nassa (Hinia) siquijorensis A. Adams, 1852; Nassa (Hinia) siquijorensis marinuensis Koperberg, 1931; Nassa (Hinia) siquijorensis timorensis Koperberg, 1931; Nassa (Zeuxis) canaliculata (Lamarck, 1822); Nassa (Zeuxis) canaliculata teschi Koperberg, 1931; Nassa cingenda Marrat, 1880; Nassa crenellifera A. Adams, 1852; Nassa siquijorensis A. Adams, 1852; Nassa steindachneri Sturany, 1900; Nassarius canaliculatus (Lamarck, 1822); Nassarius hirasei Kuroda & Habe, 1952; Nassarius (Zeuxis) hirasei Kuroda, T. & T. Habe, 1952; Nassarius (Zeuxis) siquijorensis (A. Adams, 1852); Zeuxis hirasei (Kuroda & Habe, 1952)

= Nassarius siquijorensis =

Species of gastropod

Nassarius siquijorensis, common name the burned nassa, is a species of sea snail, a marine gastropod mollusk in the family Nassariidae, the nassa mud snails or dog whelks.

== Description ==
The length of the shell varies between 20 mm and 43 mm.

The ovate, conical shell is somewhat ventricose. It is of a pale fawn color. The spire is composed of eight whorls. The upper ones are longitudinally folded, and slightly striated transversely; the two lower ones smooth, convex and strongly canaliculated. The body whorl is furrowed at the base, and frequently ornamented about the middle with two bands of a chestnut color. The ovate aperture is white, its cavity brown. The outer lip is thick, denticulated upon the edge of the lower part and striated within. The left lip gives rise to a thin and elevated callosity upon the edge of the columella, and towards the top a very prominent transverse fold, forming the commencement of a canal.

== Distribution ==
This species occurs in the Red Sea and in the Indian Ocean off the Mascarene Basin; off Japan.
