= Phrontis karinae =

Scientific classification
- Kingdom: Animalia
- Phylum: Mollusca
- Class: Gastropoda
- Subclass: Caenogastropoda
- Order: Neogastropoda
- Family: Nassariidae
- Genus: Phrontis
- Species: P. karinae

Binomial name
- Phrontis karinae (Nowell-Usticke, 1971)

Synonyms
- Nassarius albus var. nanus Nowell-Usticke, 1959 (invalid: junior secondary homonym of Nassarius nanus (A. Adams, 1852)); Nassarius karinae Nowell-Usticke, 1971

Species of gastropod

Phrontis karinae is a species of sea snail, a marine gastropod mollusk in the family Nassariidae, the Nassa mud snails or dog whelks.
