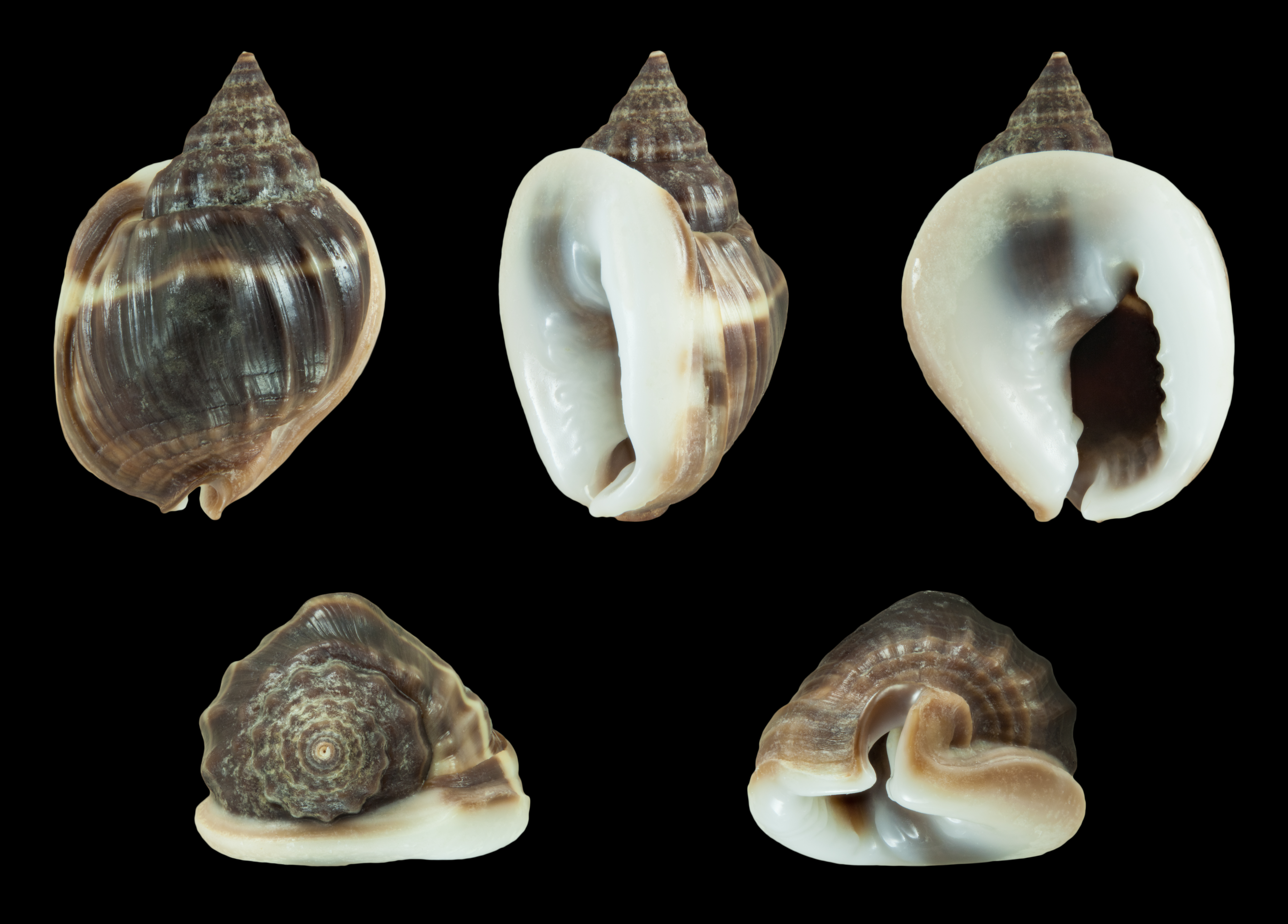
- Nassarius pullus

Scientific classification
- Kingdom: Animalia
- Phylum: Mollusca
- Class: Gastropoda
- Subclass: Caenogastropoda
- Order: Neogastropoda
- Family: Nassariidae
- Genus: Nassarius
- Species: N. pullus

Binomial name
- Nassarius pullus Linnaeus, 1758

Synonyms
- list of synonyms: Arcularia (Plicarcularia) thersites (Bruguière, 1789); Arcularia thersites (Bruguière, 1789); Buccinum pullus Linnaeus, 1758; Buccinum thersites Bruguière, J.G., 1789; Cassis pullus Röding, 1798; Nassa (Arcularia) thersites (Bruguière, 1789); Nassa (Eione) dorsuosa A. Adams, 1852; † Nassa (Eione) sondeiana K. Martin, 1895; Nassa (Eione) thersites (Bruguière, 1789); Nassa dorsuosa Adams, A., 1852; Nassa gracilis Pease, W.H., 1868; Nassa pulla (Linnaeus, 1758); Nassa thersites (Bruguière, 1789); Nassa thersites var. acypha Martens, 1886; Nassarius (Arcularia) thersites; Nassarius (Plicarcularia) pullus (Linnaeus, 1758) · accepted, alternate representation; Nassarius (Plicarcularia) thersites (Bruguière, 1789); Nassarius acypha Martens, E.C. von, 1887; Nassarius thersites (Bruguière, 1789); Plicarcularia thersites (Bruguière, 1789)

= Nassarius pullus =

Species of gastropod

Nassarius pullus, commonly known as the black nassa, olive dog whelk, and ribbed dog whelk, is a species of sea snail, a marine gastropod mollusc in the family Nassariidae, the nassa mud snails or dog whelks.

== Description ==
The length of the shell varies between 10 mm and 25 mm.

The shell is ovate and ventricose. The pointed spire is composed of six or seven whorls. These are slightly angular at their upper part, loaded with very convex longitudinal folds near the suture. These folds are less prominent, and more flattened upon the outer lip of the body whorl. It is intersected by numerous transverse striae. The upper extremity of the fold is sometimes separated by a stria which divides them superficially. The white aperture is ovate, terminated above by an emargination of the outer lip, and by a transverse ridge of the inner lip. The outer lip is thin, slightly denticulated at the base, furnished with numerous striae; internally. The columella is arcuated, covered by the inner lip, which conceals, by its expansion, a part of the body of the shell, and forms a large, white, and polished callosity. The ground color of this shell is whitish, ash or bluish, sometimes without spots or bands, at other times with two or three deeper bands which surround the whorls.

== Distribution ==
This species occurs in the Central and East Indian Ocean off Mauritius, Madagascar and Tanzania; off East India, Sri Lanka, Thailand, the Philippines, China, and in the Western Pacific Ocean off Papua New Guinea, New Caledonia, the New Hebrides, the Solomon Islands and Australia (Queensland).
