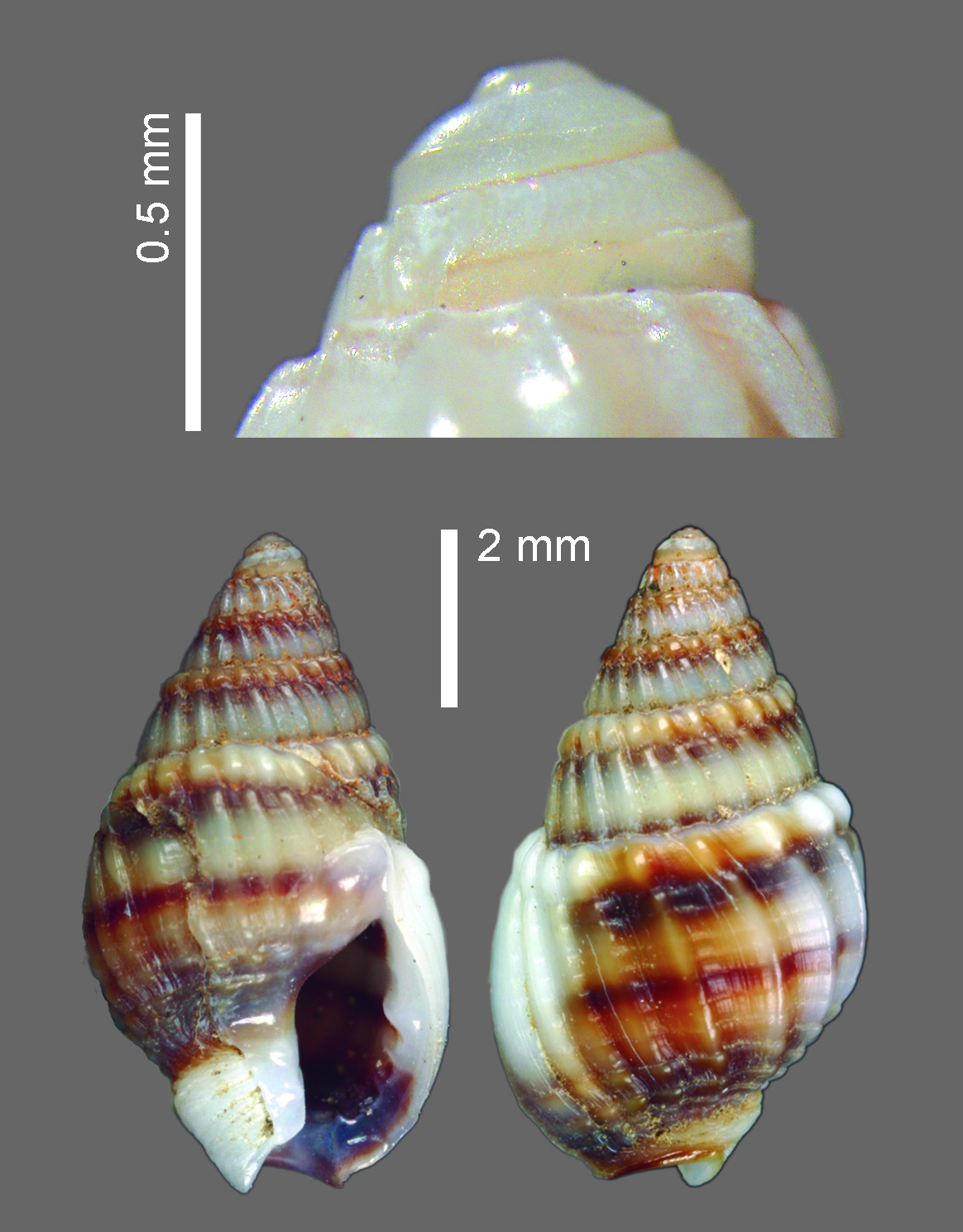
- Shell of Nassarius sinusigerus (specimen at MNHN, Paris)

Scientific classification
- Kingdom: Animalia
- Phylum: Mollusca
- Class: Gastropoda
- Subclass: Caenogastropoda
- Order: Neogastropoda
- Family: Nassariidae
- Genus: Nassarius
- Species: N. sinusigerus

Binomial name
- Nassarius sinusigerus A. Adams, 1851

Synonyms
- Nassa (Alectryon) collaticia Melvill & Standen, 1901; Nassa (Alectryon) ovoidea brevis (f) Schepman, M.M., 1911; Nassa (Hima) sinusigera A. Adams, 1852; Nassa (Niotha) sinusigera A. Adams, 1852; Nassa (Niotha) sinusigera var. cernica G. Nevill & H. Nevill, 1874; Nassa abyssinica Marrat, 1877; Nassa aracanensis E.A. Smith, 1899; Nassa beata Gould, 1860; Nassa lathraia Sturany, 1900; Nassa phoenicensis Preston, 1916; Nassa sinusigera A. Adams, 1851; Nassarius (Alectrion) collaticia Melvill & Standen, 1901; Nassarius (Hima) aracanensis (E.A. Smith, 1899); Nassarius (Niotha) sinusigerus (A. Adams, 1852); Nassarius (Telasco) sinusigerus (A. Adams, 1852); † Nassarius (Zeuxis) macrocephalus greyanus Shuto, 1969; Niotha sinusigera (A. Adams, 1852)

= Nassarius sinusigerus =

Species of gastropod

Nassarius sinusigerus is a species of sea snail, a marine gastropod mollusk in the family Nassariidae, the nassa mud snails or dog whelks.

== Ecology ==
Nassarius sinusigerus is an opportunistic scavenger. Studies in the Gulf of Aqaba found the species is strongly attracted to organically enriched sediments beneath fish farm cages, likely due to increased food availability, though its distribution is limited by adverse sediment conditions such as anoxia and high sulfide levels. Because of this sensitivity, the species' distribution has been proposed as a potential bioindicator of sediment quality near aquaculture operations.

The shell size varies between 6.5 mm and 12 mm.

== Distribution ==
This species occurs in the Red Sea and in the Indian Ocean off Madagascar, off the Philippines and in the central Pacific Ocean. In the Gulf of Aqaba, the species has been recorded at depths of around 24 metres, where it is a dominant member of the macrobenthic community near fish farms.
