= Nassarius idyllius =

Scientific classification
- Kingdom: Animalia
- Phylum: Mollusca
- Class: Gastropoda
- Subclass: Caenogastropoda
- Order: Neogastropoda
- Family: Nassariidae
- Genus: Nassarius
- Species: N. idyllius

Binomial name
- Nassarius idyllius (Melvill & Standen, 1901)

Synonyms
- Arcularia caelata var. torresiana Hedley, 1915; Nassa (Aciculina) ovoidea Schepman, 1911; Nassa (Alectryon) ovoidea Schepman, 1911; Nassa (Alectryon) schepmani Koperberg, 1931; Nassa idyllia Melvill & Standen, 1901; Nassa munda Sturany, 1900; Nassarius (Arcularia) caelata torresiana (f) Hedley, C; Nassarius (Alectrion) idyllius (Melvill & Standen, 1901); Nassarius (Alectrion) ovoideus (Schepman, 1911); Nassarius (Hima) crebricostatus dilemensis Oostingh, 1939; Nassarius (Hima) ovoideus (Schepman, 1911); Nassarius (Zeuxis) idyllius (Melvill & Standen, 1901); Nassarius torresianus (Hedley, 1915)

Species of gastropod

Nassarius idyllius is a species of sea snail, a marine gastropod mollusc in the family Nassariidae, the nassa mud snails (USA) or dog whelks (UK).

== Description ==
The shell grows to a length of 5 mm.

== Distribution ==
This species is distributed in the Red Sea and in the Indo-West Pacific.
