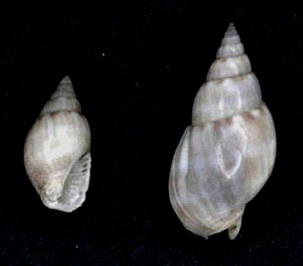
- Two shells of Nassarius comptus (museum specimens at Naturalis Biodiversity Center)

Scientific classification
- Kingdom: Animalia
- Phylum: Mollusca
- Class: Gastropoda
- Subclass: Caenogastropoda
- Order: Neogastropoda
- Family: Nassariidae
- Genus: Nassarius
- Species: N. comptus

Binomial name
- Nassarius comptus (A. Adams, 1852)

Synonyms
- Buccinum elegans Kiener, 1834; Nassa (Alectryon) elegans (Kiener, 1834); Nassa (Alectryon) flammulata Schepman, M.M., 1911; Nassa bucculenta Marrat, 1880; Nassa cinnamomea A. Adams, 1852; Nassa compta A. Adams, 1852 (original combination); Nassa polita Marrat, 1880; Nassa xesta Sturany, 1900; Nassarius (Zeuxis) comptus (A. Adams, 1852); Nassarius compta spelling variation

= Nassarius comptus =

Species of gastropod

Nassarius comptus is a species of sea snail, a marine gastropod mollusc in the family Nassariidae, the Nassa mud snails or dog whelks.

There is one subspecies : Nassarius comptus polita (Marrat, 1880)

== Description ==
The shell size varies between 15 mm and 24 mm

== Distribution ==
This species occurs in the Red Sea and in the Indian Ocean off the Mascarene Basin and Mauritius and in the Pacific Ocean off Indonesia and Australia (Queensland).
