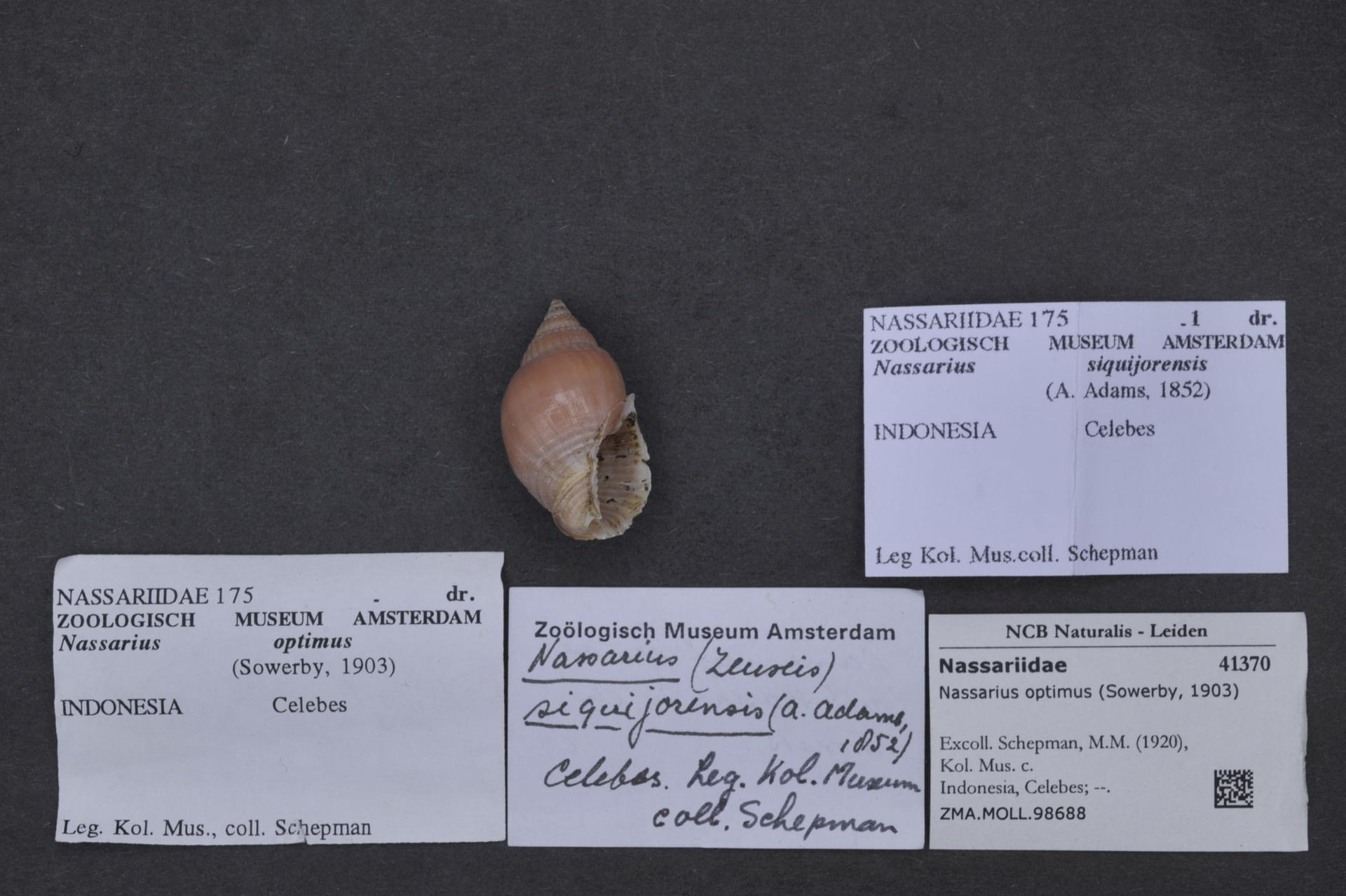
- Nassarius optimus shell. Sample from 1903

Scientific classification
- Kingdom: Animalia
- Phylum: Mollusca
- Class: Gastropoda
- Subclass: Caenogastropoda
- Order: Neogastropoda
- Family: Nassariidae
- Genus: Nassarius
- Species: N. optimus

Binomial name
- Nassarius optimus (G.B. Sowerby III, 1903)

Synonyms
- Nassa optima G.B. Sowerby III, 1903

= Nassarius optimus =

Species of gastropod

Nassarius optimus is a species of sea snail, a marine gastropod mollusc in the family Nassariidae, the nassa snails.

== Description ==
The shell size varies between 20 mm and 30 mm.

== Distribution ==
This species occurs in the Indian Ocean off Madagascar and in the Pacific Ocean off Northern Australia, the Philippines and New Caledonia.
