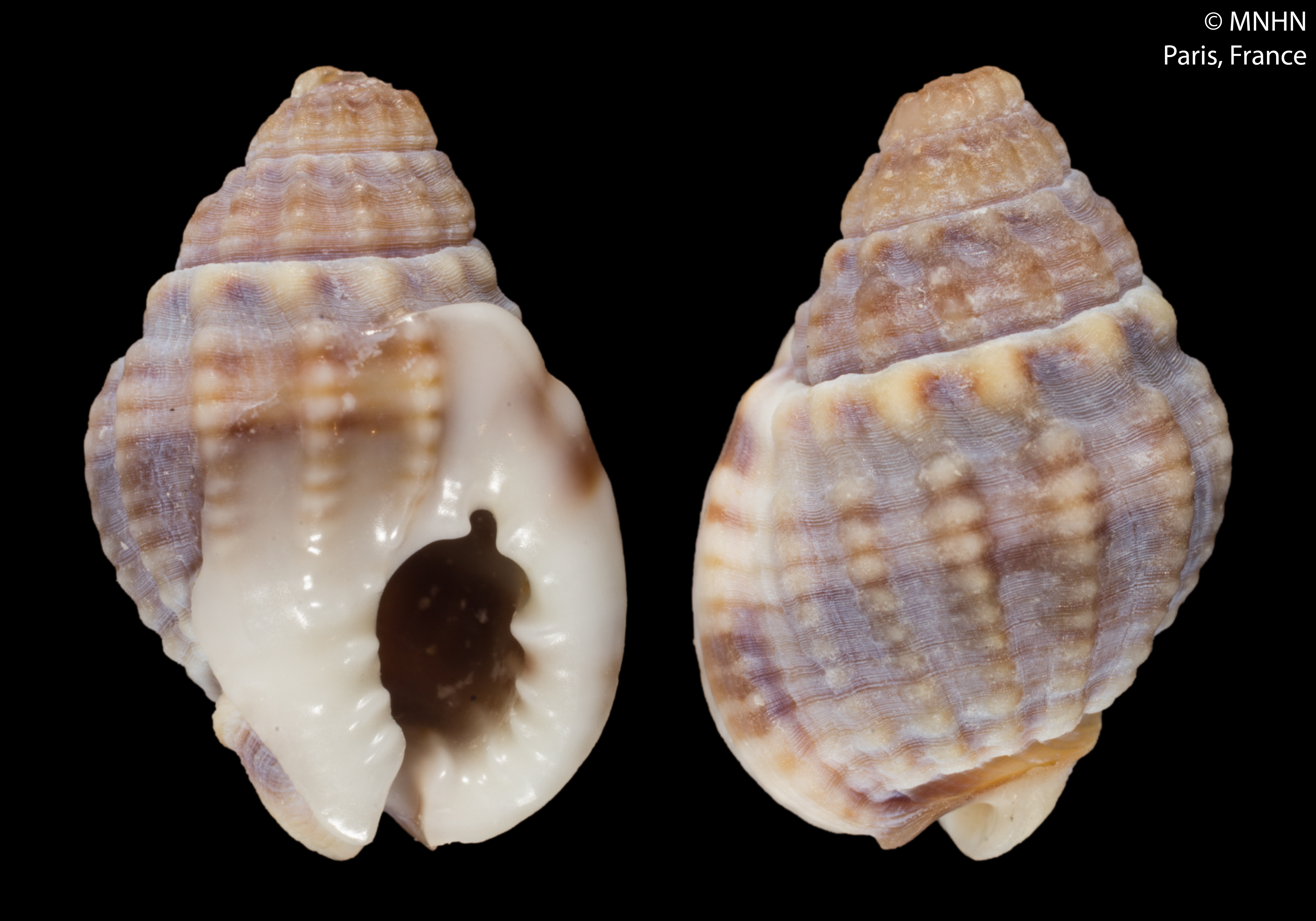
- Shell of Nassarius deshayesianus (syntype at MNHN, Paris)

Scientific classification
- Kingdom: Animalia
- Phylum: Mollusca
- Class: Gastropoda
- Subclass: Caenogastropoda
- Order: Neogastropoda
- Family: Nassariidae
- Subfamily: Nassariinae
- Genus: Nassarius
- Species: N. deshayesianus

Binomial name
- Nassarius deshayesianus (Issel, 1866)

Synonyms
- Nassa (Arcularia) obockensis (Jousseaume, 1888); Nassa (Phrontis) obockensis (Jousseaume, 1888); Nassa (Phrontis) zailensis G. B. Sowerby III, 1894; Nassa (Phrontis) zailensis var. andamanica Melvill & Sykes, 1899; Nassa deshayesiana Issel, 1866; Nassa obockensis (Jousseaume, 1888); Nassa zailensis G.B. Sowerby III, 1894; Nassa zailensis var. andamanica Melvill & Sykes, 1898; Nassarius (Niotha) deshayesianus (Issel, 1866); Nassarius (Phrontis) deshayesianus (Issel, 1866); Phrontis obockensis Jousseaume, 1888

= Nassarius deshayesianus =

Species of gastropod

Nassarius deshayesianus is a species of sea snail, a marine gastropod mollusc in the family Nassariidae, the nassa mud snails (USA) or dog whelks (UK). Nassariius deshayesinus are found in warm sampling areas. Moreover, the rate of metabolism species will decline if salinity is increased by up to 41 psu. To add on, salinity is the limiting factor of the distribution of aquatic organism, and it influence on the physiological processes is like hemolymph osmolarity and the water content in the tissue can lead to death in most aquatic organism in the phylum of Nassariidae. (Xiao et al, 2014).

== Description ==
The shell grows to a length of 15 mm (0.59 in).

== Distribution ==
This species occurs in the Red Sea and the Strait of Hormuz.
