= Callus (mollusc) =

Anatomical feature in some mollusc shells

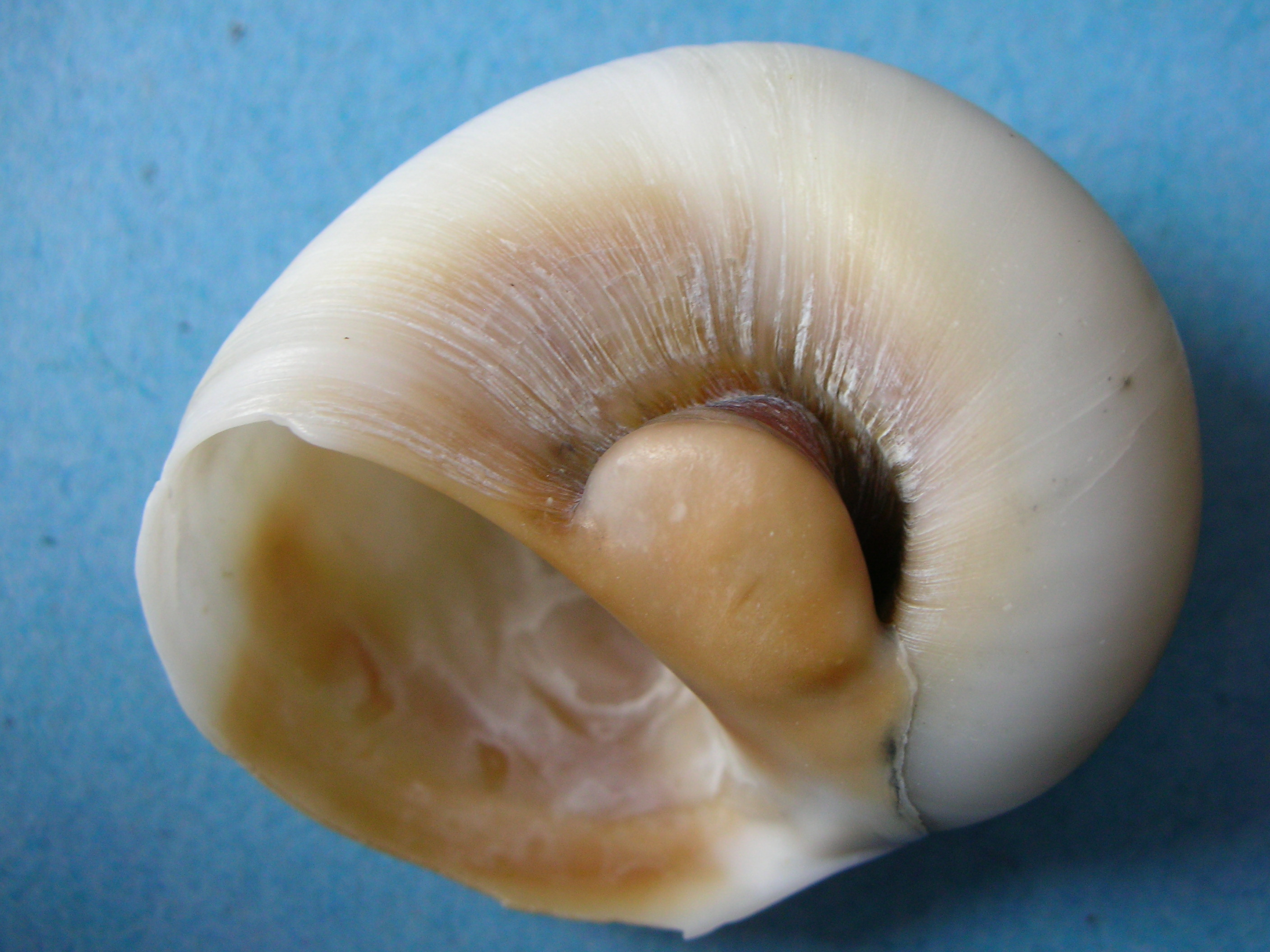
The shell of the sea snail Neverita josephinia has an umbilical callus which almost completely fills the umbilicus, leaving only a groove open.

A callus is an anatomical feature that exists in some mollusc shells, a thickened area of shell material that can partly or completely cover the umbilicus, or can be located as a coating on the body whorl near the aperture of the shell (i.e. a parietal callus or columellar callus). It is a hardened deposit of enamel, which varies in coloration and size depending on the species

A funiculus (plural: funiculi) is a narrow ridge of callus spiraling from the upper lip into the umbilicus.

A callus exists in the shells of various species of gastropods (snails) and also in the shells of several species of Nautilus, a cephalopod.

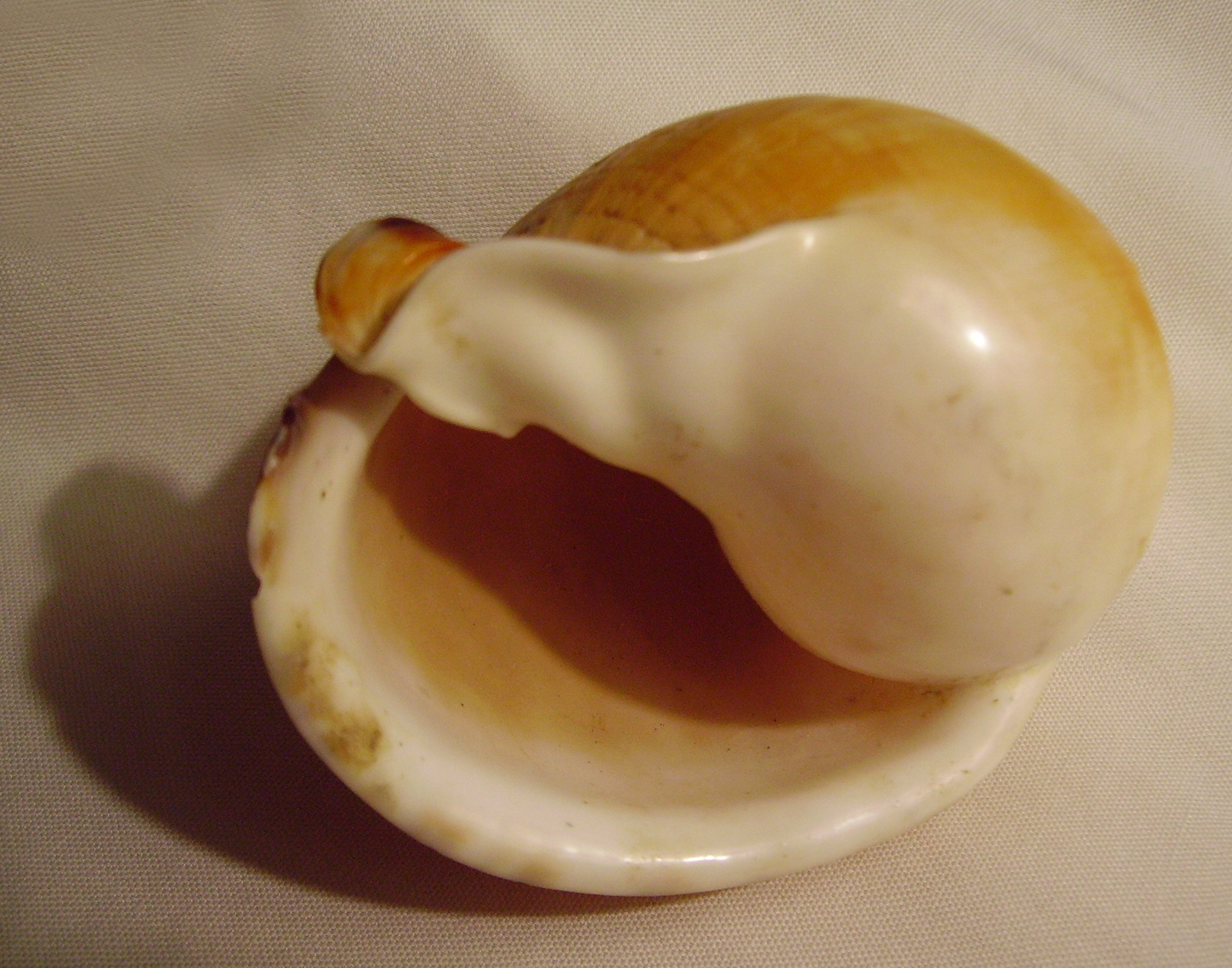
The shell of the sea snail Semicassis pyrum, has a large aperture and a pronounced parietal callus

A callum is an anatomical feature of some mature bivalve shells of species in the family Pholadidae, the piddocks. The callum is an area of shell material that fills the gap between the two valves.
