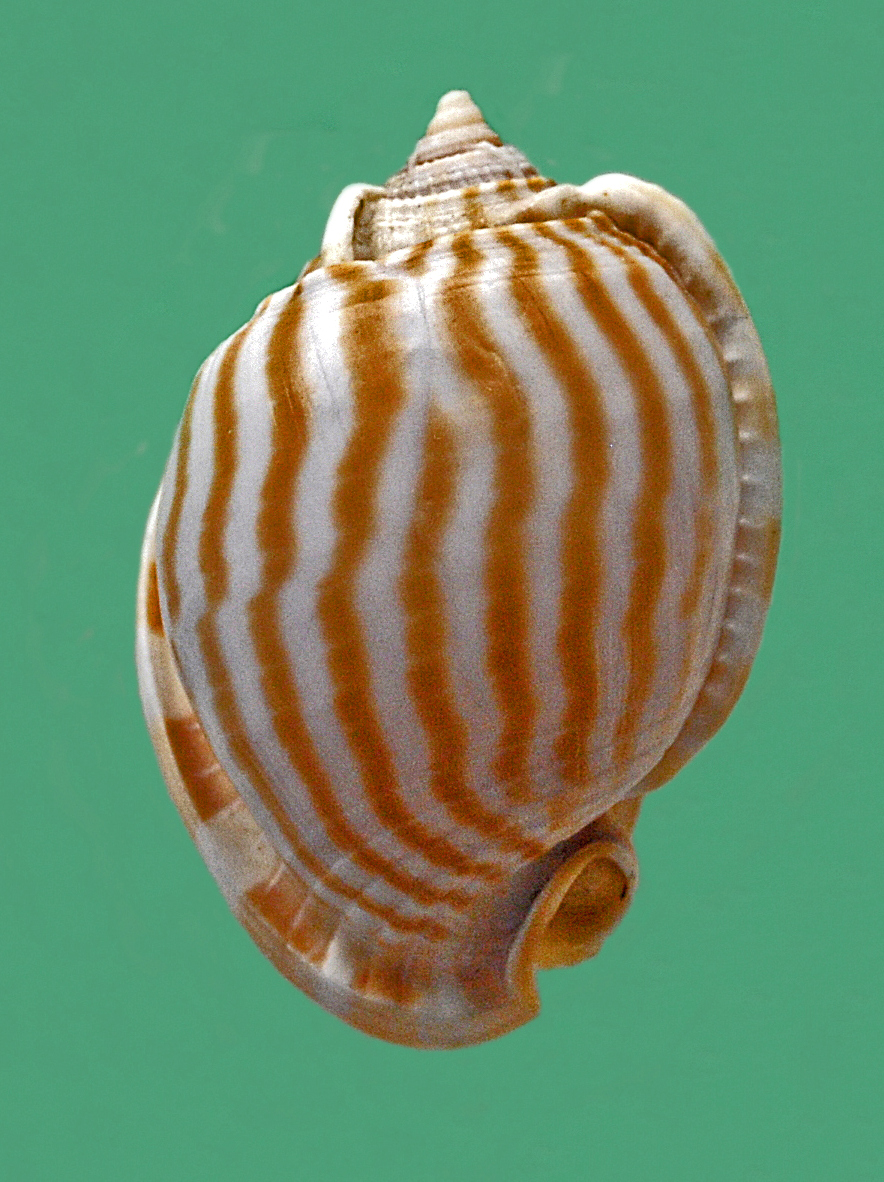
- Shell of Phalium flammiferum

Scientific classification
- Kingdom: Animalia
- Phylum: Mollusca
- Class: Gastropoda
- Subclass: Caenogastropoda
- Order: Littorinimorpha
- Superfamily: Tonnoidea
- Family: Cassidae
- Genus: Phalium; Link, 1807

Type species
- Buccinum glaucum Linnaeus, 1758

Synonyms
- Bezoardica Schumacher, 1817 (junior objective synonym of Phalium); Bezoardicella Habe, 1961; Cassis (Bezoardica) Schumacher, 1817; Phalium (Phalium) Link, 1807

= Phalium =

Genus of gastropods

Phalium, common name the bonnet shells, is a genus of large sea snails, marine gastropod molluscs in the subfamily Phaliinae of the family Cassidae, the helmet shells, bonnet shells and their allies.

== Taxonomy ==
Abbott (1968) held a very comprehensive concept of the genus Phalium, to include all the species of the subfamily Phaliinae except those included in Casmaria H.& A. Adams, 1853. Current authors (Alf, 1997; Beu, 2008) would include in Phalium only those species which have varixes all along the spire and have spines around the outer edge of the terminal varix as in Casmaria. Species with predominantly spiral sculpture and with only a terminal varix without spines are currently classified in Semicassis Mörch, 1852 but often cited under Phalium.

== Species ==
According to the World Register of Marine Species (WoRMS), the following species with valid names are included within the genus Phalium :

- Phalium areola (Linnaeus, 1758)
- Phalium bandatum (Perry, 1811)
- Phalium decussatum (Linnaeus, 1758)
- Phalium evdoxiae H. Morrison, 2016
- Phalium exaratum (Reeve, 1848)
- Phalium fimbria (Gmelin, 1791)
- Phalium flammiferum (Röding, 1798)
- Phalium glaucum (Linnaeus, 1758)
- † Phalium menkrawitense Beets, 1941
- Phalium muangmani Raybaudi Massilia & Prati Musetti, 1995

Species brought into synonymy

- Phalium adcocki (G. B. Sowerby III, 1896): synonym of Semicassis adcocki (G. B. Sowerby III, 1896)
- Phalium agnitum Iredale, 1927: synonym of Phalium areola (Linnaeus, 1758)
- Phalium andersoni Abbott, 1968: synonym of Echinophoria hadra (Woodring & Olsson, 1957)
- Phalium bisulcatum (Schubert & J. A. Wagner, 1829): synonym of Semicassis bisulcata (Schubert & J. A. Wagner, 1829)
- Phalium breviculum Tsi & Ma, 1980: synonym of Phalium flammiferum (Röding, 1798)
- Phalium cicatricosum (Gmelin, 1791): synonym of Semicassis granulata (Born, 1778)
- Phalium clathratum Link, 1807: synonym of Phalium areola (Linnaeus, 1758)
- Phalium coronadoi (Crosse, 1867): synonym of Echinophoria coronadoi (Crosse, 1867)
- Phalium craticulatum (Euthyme, 1885): synonym of Semicassis craticulata (Euthyme, 1885)
- Phalium decipiens Kilburn, 1980: synonym of Semicassis decipiens (Kilburn, 1980) (original combination)
- Phalium denisi Salmon, 1948: synonym of Semicassis angasi (Iredale, 1927)
- Phalium edentulum Link, 1807: synonym of Casmaria erinaceus (Linnaeus, 1758)
- Phalium extinctum Link, 1807: synonym of Phalium areola (Linnaeus, 1758)
- Phalium faurotis (Jousseaume, 1888): synonym of Semicassis faurotis (Jousseaume, 1888)
- Phalium fibratum P. Marshall & Murdoch, 1920 †: synonym of Semicassis fibrata (P. Marshall & Murdoch, 1920) †
- Phalium fimbriata (Gmelin, 1791): synonym of Phalium fimbria (Gmelin, 1791) (misspelling)
- Phalium glabratum (Dunker, 1852): synonym of Semicassis glabrata (Dunker, 1852)
- Phalium grangei Marwick, 1926 †: synonym of Echinophoria grangei (Marwick, 1926) †
- Phalium granulatum (Von Born, 1778): synonym of Semicassis granulata (Born, 1778)
- Phalium hectori Abbott, 1968 †: synonym of Echinophoria pollens (Finlay, 1926) †
- Phalium iheringi Carcelles, 1953: synonym of Semicassis zeylanica (Lamarck, 1822)
- Phalium inornatum Pilsbry, 1895 : synonym of Semicassis inornata (Pilsbry, 1895)
- Phalium kurodai Abbott, 1968 : synonym of Echinophoria wyvillei (Watson, 1886)
- Phalium labiatum (Perry, 1811): synonym of Semicassis labiata (Perry, 1811)
- Phalium microstoma (E. von Martens, 1904): synonym of Semicassis microstoma (E. von Martens, 1904)
- Phalium pila (Reeve, 1848): synonym of Semicassis bisulcata (Schubert & J. A. Wagner, 1829)
- Phalium ponderosa [sic]: synonym of Phalium ponderosum (Gmelin, 1791): synonym of Casmaria ponderosa (Gmelin, 1791)
- Phalium ponderosum (Gmelin, 1791): synonym of Casmaria ponderosa (Gmelin, 1791)
- Phalium pseudobandatum S. K. Tan, H. E. Ng & Nguang, 2013: synonym of Phalium bandatum (Perry, 1811)
- Phalium pyrum (Lamarck, 1822): synonym of Semicassis pyrum (Lamarck, 1822)
- Phalium quadratum Link, 1807: synonym of Casmaria ponderosa (Gmelin, 1791)
- Phalium saburon (Bruguière, 1792) : synonym of Semicassis saburon (Bruguière, 1792)
- Phalium semigranosum (Lamarck, 1822): synonym of Semicassis semigranosa (Lamarck, 1822)
- Phalium skinneri Marwick, 1928 †: synonym of Semicassis skinneri (Marwick, 1928) †
- Phalium stadiale (Hedley, 1914): synonym of Semicassis pyrum (Lamarck, 1822)
- Phalium strigatum (Gmelin, 1791): synonym of Phalium flammiferum (Röding, 1798)
- Phalium sulcatum Link, 1807: synonym of Phalium areola (Linnaeus, 1758)
- Phalium torquatum Reeve, 1848: synonym of Casmaria ponderosa (Gmelin, 1791)
- Phalium undulatum (Gmelin, 1791): synonym of Semicassis granulata (Born, 1778)
- Phalium vibex Linnaeus, 1758: synonym of Casmaria erinaceus (Linnaeus, 1758)
- Phalium whitworthi Abbott, 1968: synonym of Semicassis whitworthi (Abbott, 1968)
