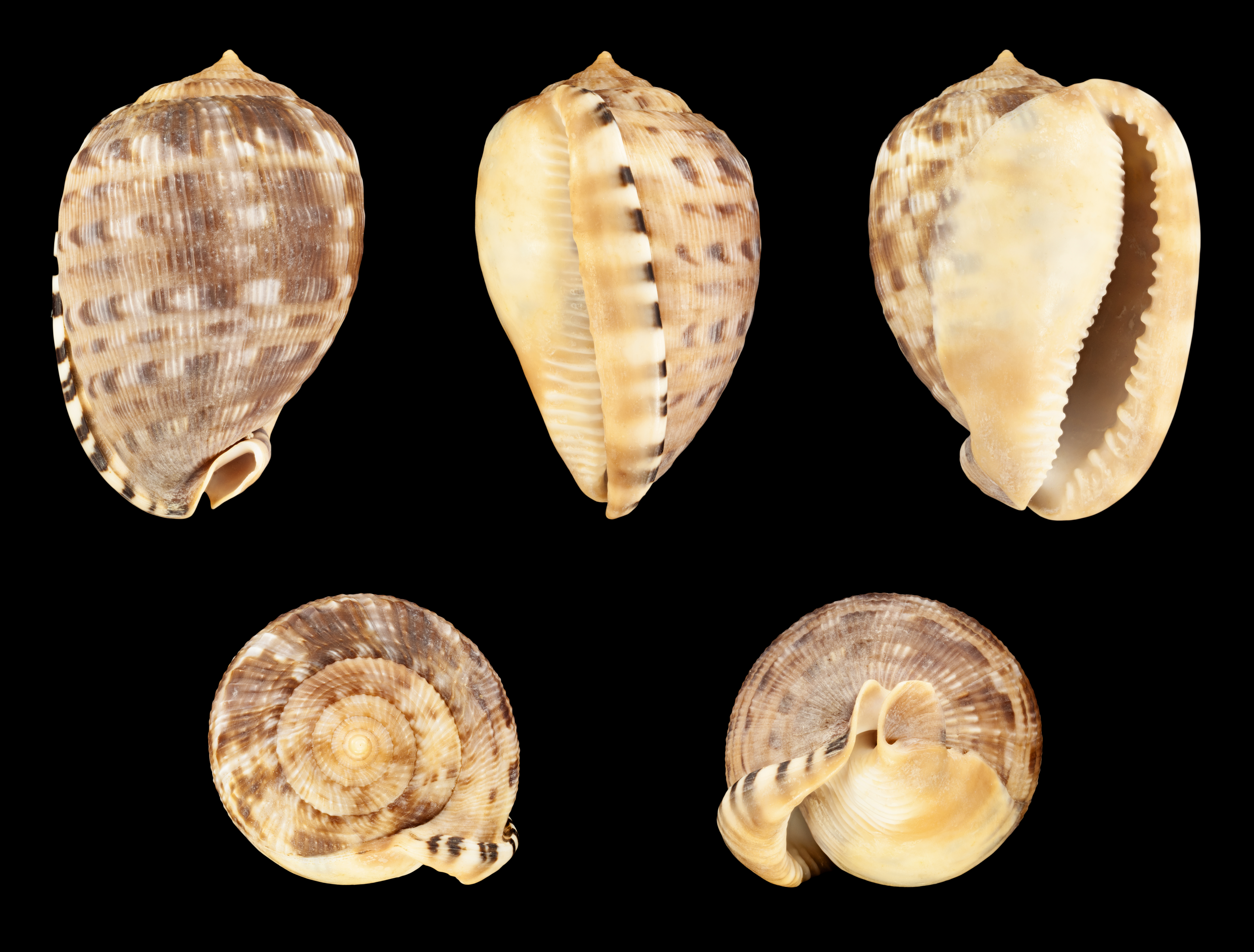

Scientific classification
- Kingdom: Animalia
- Phylum: Mollusca
- Class: Gastropoda
- Subclass: Caenogastropoda
- Order: Littorinimorpha
- Family: Cassidae
- Genus: Cypraecassis
- Species: C. testiculus

Binomial name
- Cypraecassis testiculus (Linnaeus, 1758)

= Cypraecassis testiculus =

Species of gastropod

Cypraecassis testiculus, common name the reticulated cowry helmet, is a species of medium-sized sea snail, a marine gastropod mollusk in the family Cassidae, the helmet snails and bonnet snails.

There is one subspecies : Cypraecassis testiculus senegalica (Gmelin, 1791)

== Distribution ==
This species can be found on rocky shores in the Atlantic Ocean (Angola, North Carolina to Northeast Brazil), the Gulf of Mexico, the Caribbean Sea and the Lesser Antilles.

== Description ==
The maximum recorded shell length is 85 mm.

== Habitat ==
The minimum recorded depth for this species is 0 m; maximum recorded depth is 60 m.
Freshly-dead 'crabbed' shells have been trapped at 150–180 metres depth
off West coast Barbados in the Lesser Antilles.
