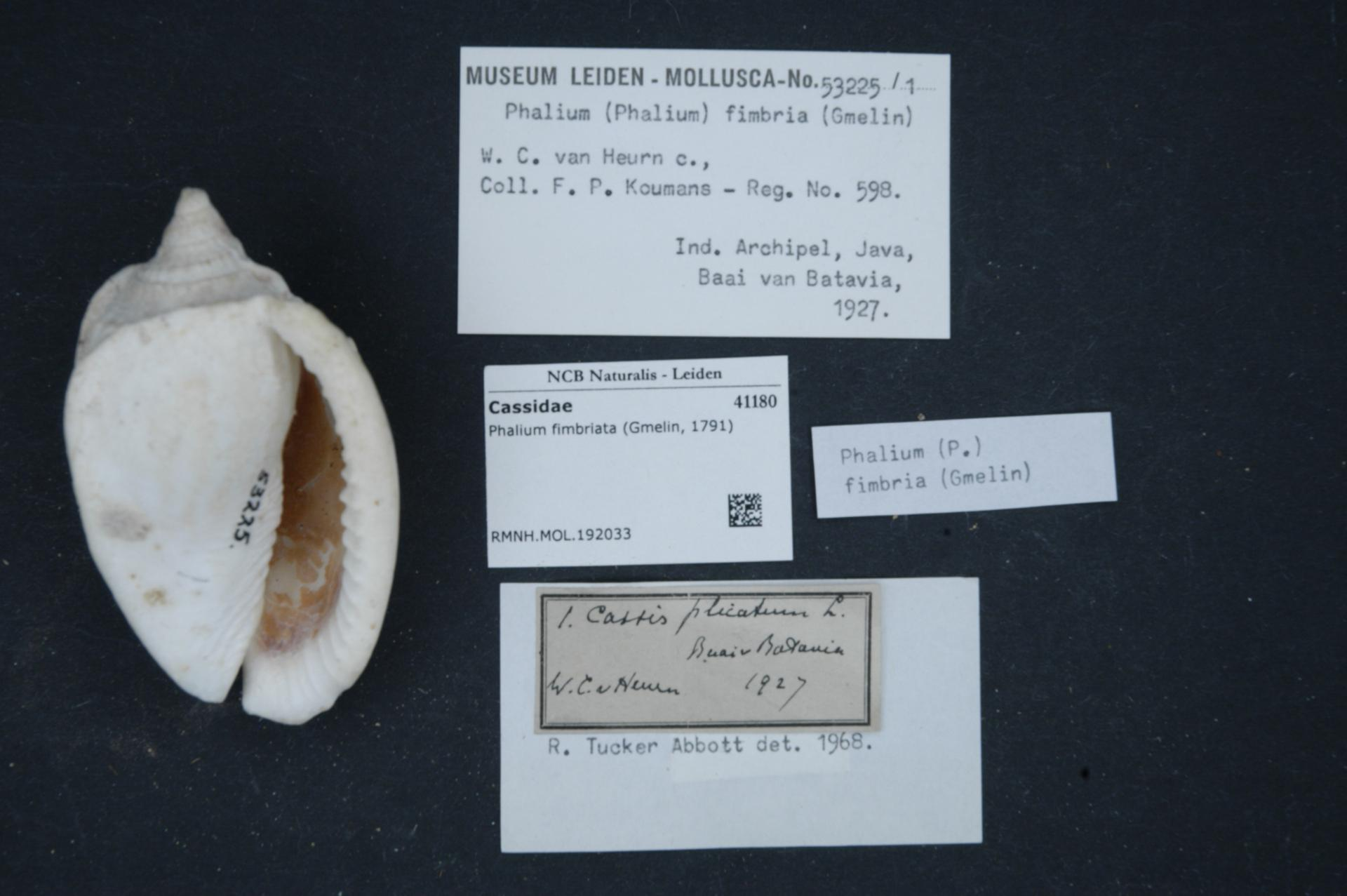

Scientific classification
- Kingdom: Animalia
- Phylum: Mollusca
- Class: Gastropoda
- Subclass: Caenogastropoda
- Order: Littorinimorpha
- Family: Cassidae
- Genus: Phalium
- Species: P. fimbria

Binomial name
- Phalium fimbria (Gmelin, 1791)

Synonyms
- Buccinum fimbria Gmelin, 1791 (original combination); Cassis plicaria Lamarck, 1822; Cassis plicata Deshayes, 1844; Phalium fimbriata (misspelling)

= Phalium fimbria =

Species of gastropod

Phalium fimbria is a species of large sea snail, a marine gastropod mollusk in the family Cassidae, the helmet snails and bonnet snails.

== Description ==
Shell size 80 mm.

== Distribution ==
Indian Ocean: Madagascar
