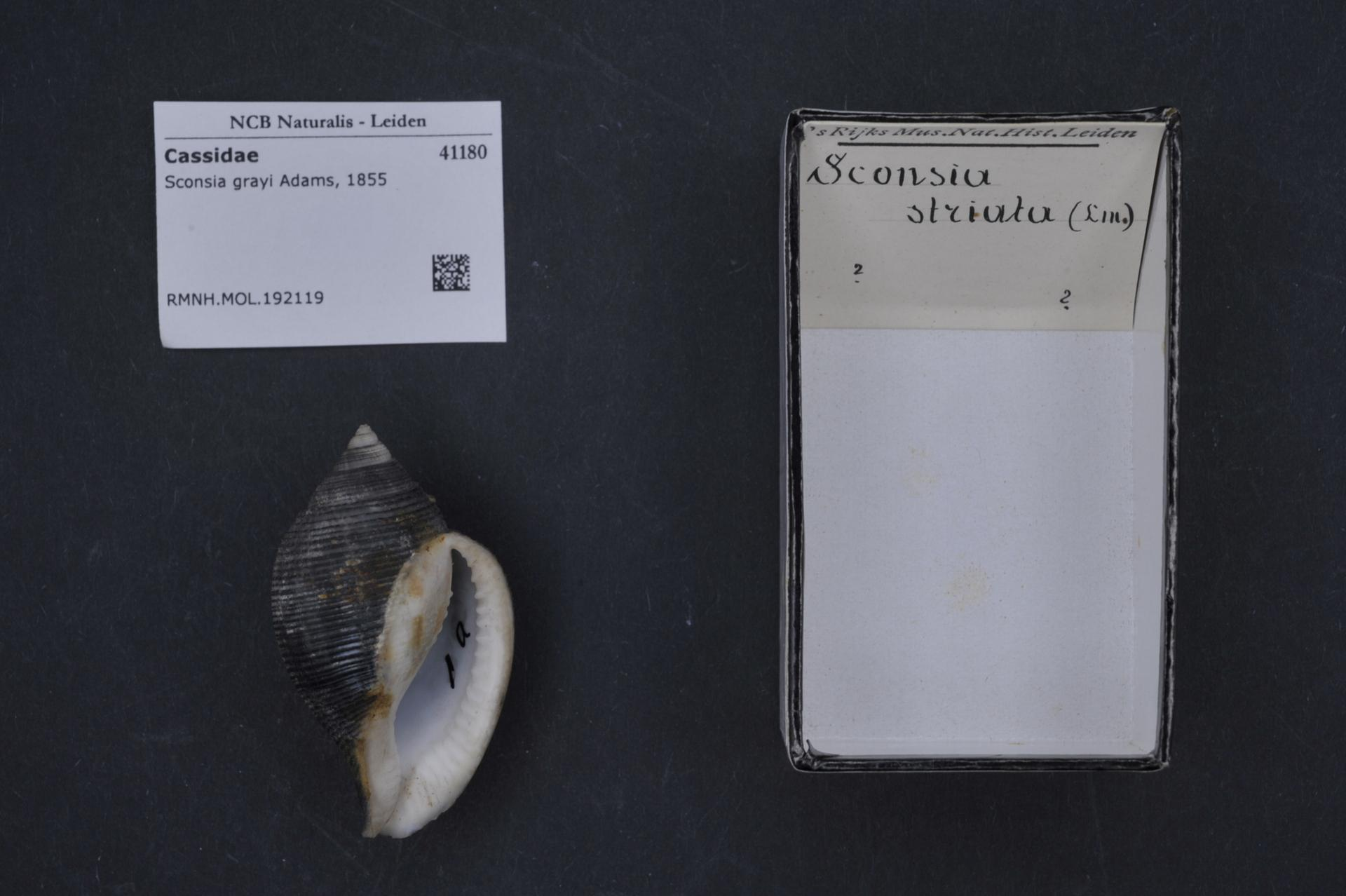

Scientific classification
- Kingdom: Animalia
- Phylum: Mollusca
- Class: Gastropoda
- Subclass: Caenogastropoda
- Order: Littorinimorpha
- Family: Cassidae
- Genus: Sconsia
- Species: S. grayi

Binomial name
- Sconsia grayi A. Adams, 1855

= Sconsia grayi =

Species of gastropod

Sconsia grayi is a species of large sea snail, a marine gastropod mollusk in the family Cassidae, the helmet snails and bonnet snails.

== Description ==
The maximum recorded shell length is 71 mm.

== Distribution ==
Western Atlantic: Gulf of Mexico, off the coast of east Florida, the Florida Keys, Caribbean Sea and eastern Brazil.

== Habitat ==
Minimum recorded depth is 5 m. Maximum recorded depth is 640 m.
