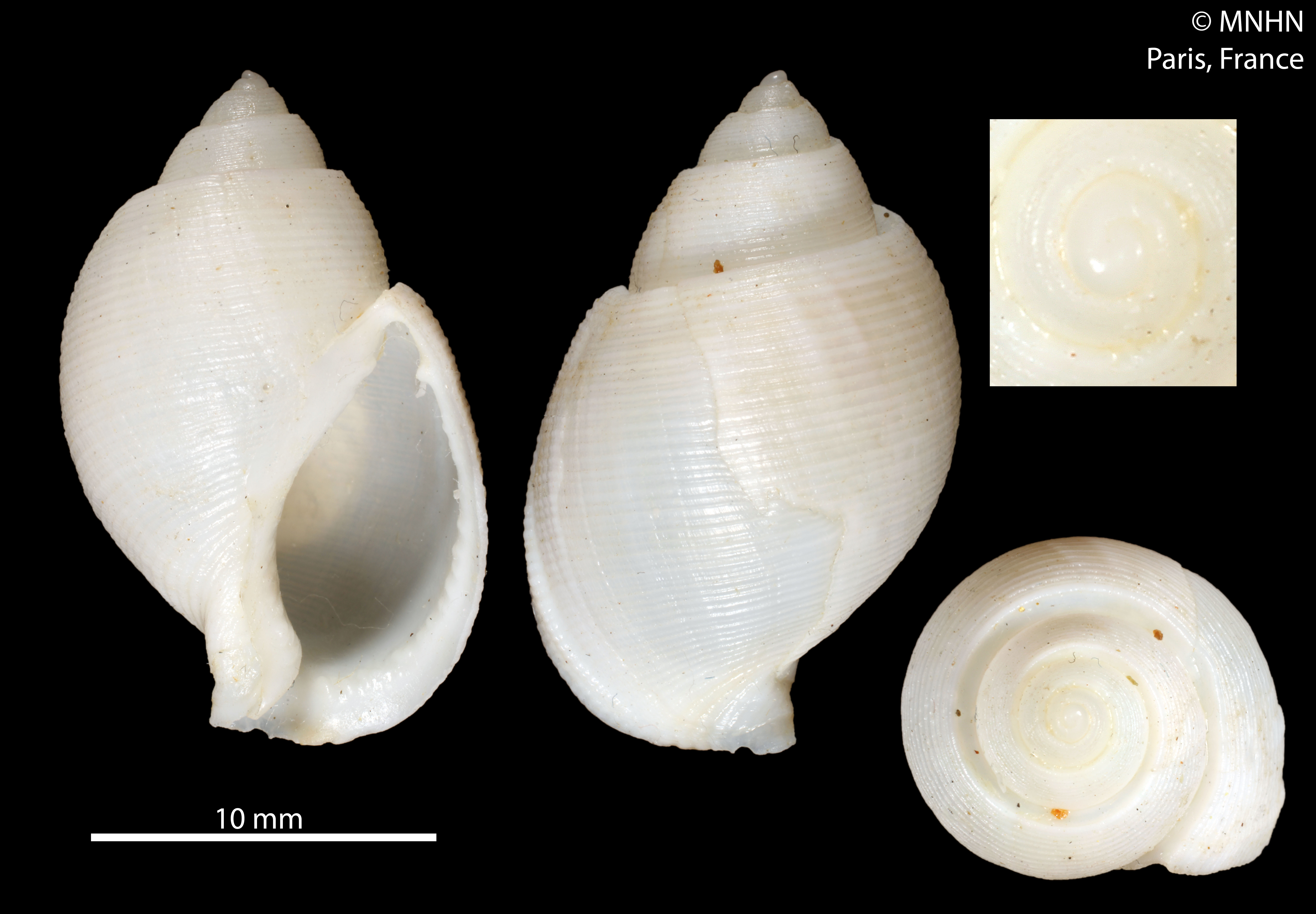

Scientific classification
- Kingdom: Animalia
- Phylum: Mollusca
- Class: Gastropoda
- Subclass: Caenogastropoda
- Order: Littorinimorpha
- Family: Cassidae
- Genus: Microsconsia
- Species: M. limpusi

Binomial name
- Microsconsia limpusi Beu, 2008

= Microsconsia limpusi =

Species of gastropod

Microsconsia limpusi is a species of large sea snail, a marine gastropod mollusk in the family Cassidae, the helmet snails and bonnet snails.

== Distribution ==
This marine species occurs off Queensland, Australia.
