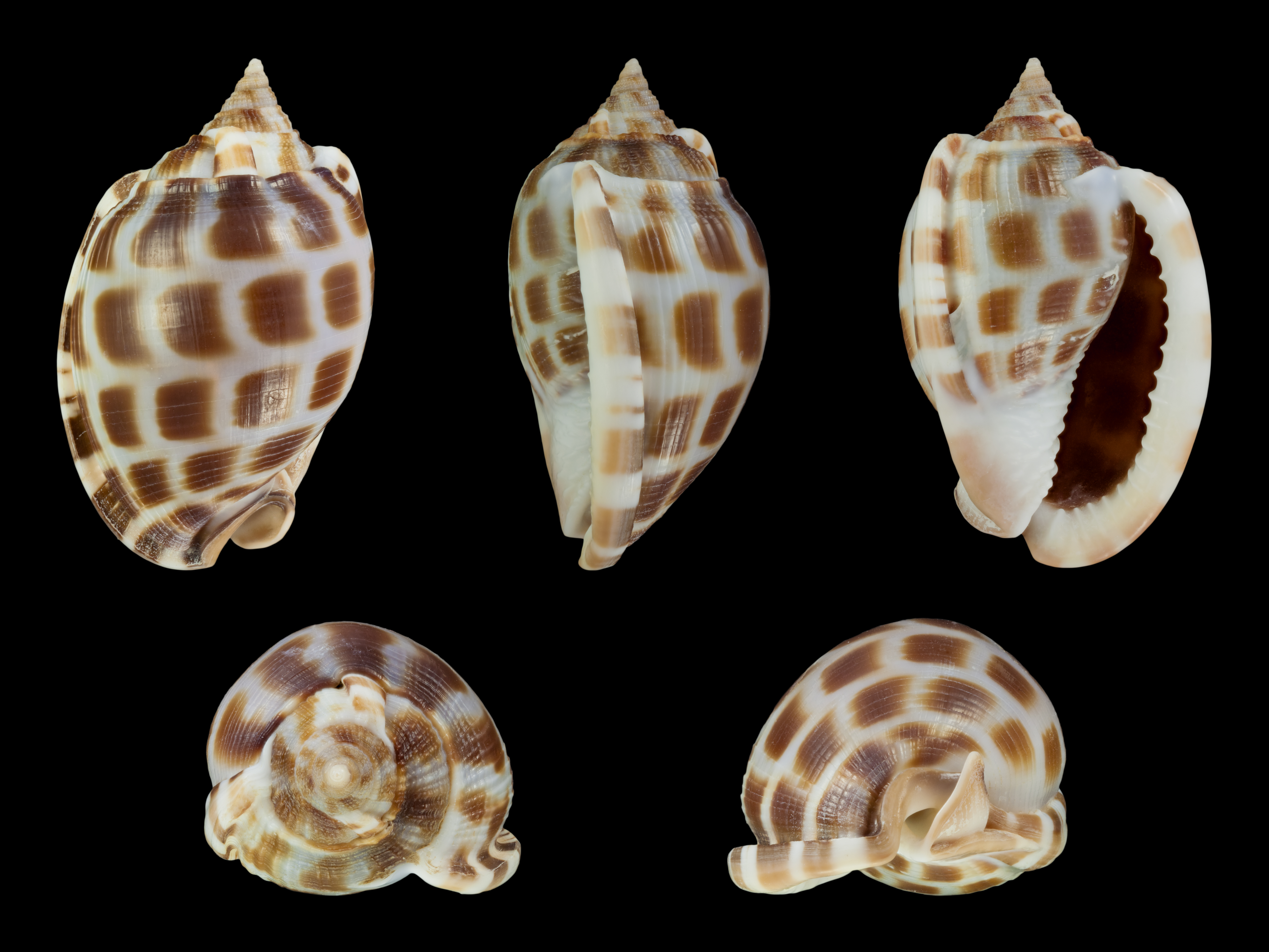
- Shell of Phalium areola

Scientific classification
- Kingdom: Animalia
- Phylum: Mollusca
- Class: Gastropoda
- Subclass: Caenogastropoda
- Order: Littorinimorpha
- Family: Cassidae
- Genus: Phalium
- Species: P. areola

Binomial name
- Phalium areola (Linnaeus, 1758)

Synonyms
- Cassis alea Röding, P.F., 1798; Cassis areola (Linnaeus, 1758); Phalium agnitum Iredale, T., 1927; Phalium areolata Schumacher, H.C.F., 1817; Phalium clathratum Link, H.F., 1807; Phalium extinctum Link, H.F., 1807; Phalium sulcatum Link, H.F., 1807

= Phalium areola =

Species of gastropod

Phalium areola, common name the checkerboard bonnet, is a species of sea snail, a marine gastropod mollusc in the subfamily Cassinae, within the family Cassidae the helmet and bonnet shells. It is also known as the checkerboard bonnet shell.

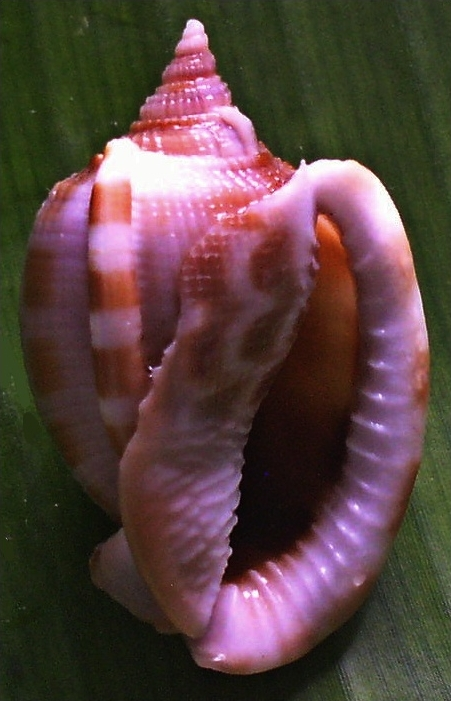
An apertural view of a shell of Phalium areola

== Distribution ==
This species occurs in the Indian Ocean along Madagascar, the Mascarene Basin, Tanzania and off the southern African coast from KwaZulu-Natal and Mozambique. It can also be found in Melanesia and along Samoa.

== Description ==
The size of an adult shell varies between 35 mm and 130 mm. These medium-sized shells are oval and acuminate, with a rather narrow mouth, the outer lip folded back and internally denticulate. Shoulder are not angulate nor plicate and the anterior prickles on outer lip obsolete. The surface of the shell is white with five series of large squarish red-brown spots (hence the common name). Later whorls show spiral striae anteriorly on whorls and above shoulders.
