= Cypraecassis wilmae =

Scientific classification
- Kingdom: Animalia
- Phylum: Mollusca
- Class: Gastropoda
- Subclass: Caenogastropoda
- Order: Littorinimorpha
- Family: Cassidae
- Genus: Cypraecassis
- Species: C. wilmae

Binomial name
- Cypraecassis wilmae Kreipl & Alf, 2000

Species of gastropod

Cypraecassis wilmae is a species of large sea snail, a marine gastropod mollusk in the family Cassidae, the helmet snails and bonnet snails.

== Distribution ==
This species has been reported from Sea of Cortez, Pacific Panama and Costa Rica.
