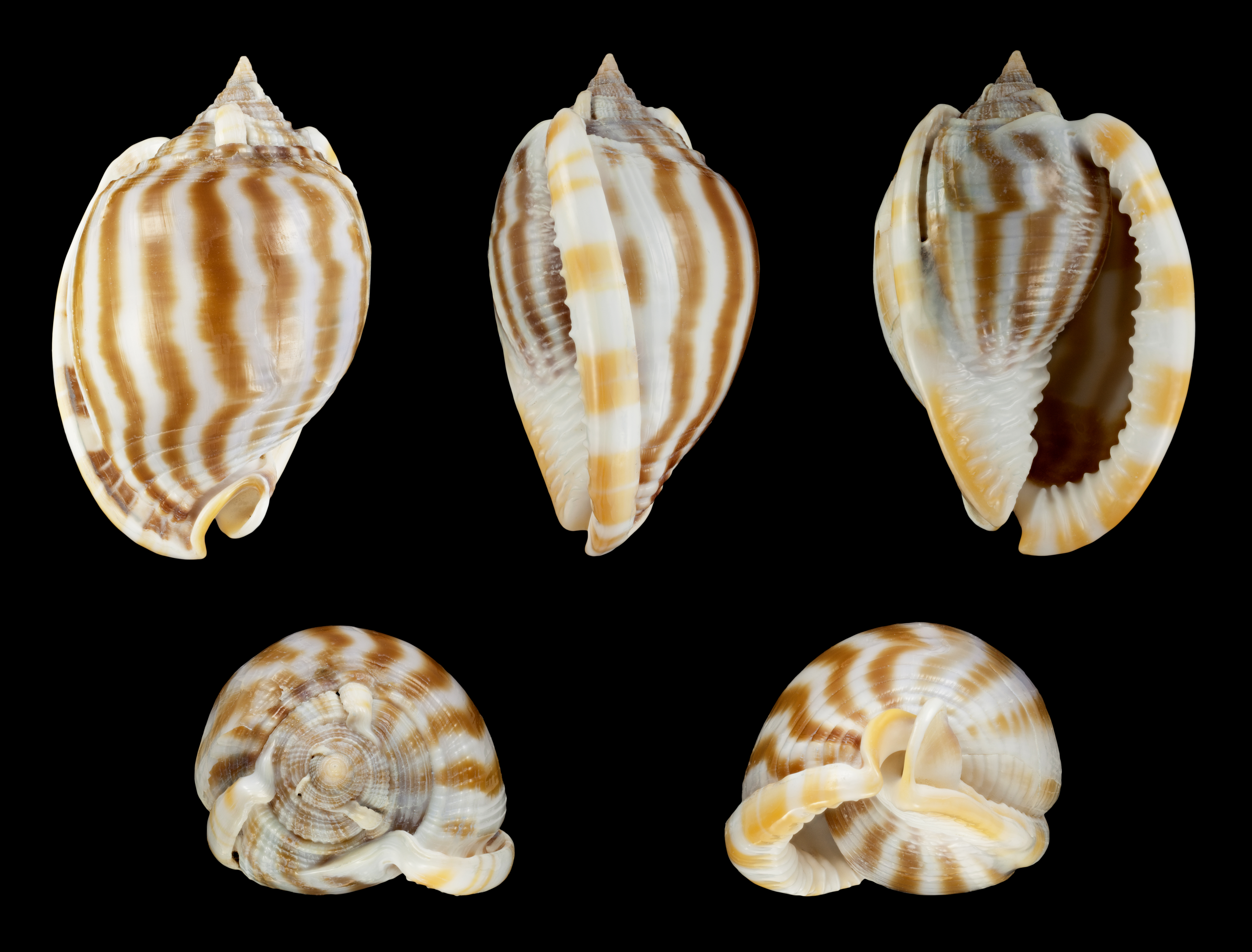
- A shell of Phalium flammiferum

Scientific classification
- Kingdom: Animalia
- Phylum: Mollusca
- Class: Gastropoda
- Subclass: Caenogastropoda
- Order: Littorinimorpha
- Family: Cassidae
- Genus: Phalium
- Species: P. flammiferum

Binomial name
- Phalium flammiferum (Röding, 1798)

Synonyms
- Buccinum rugosum Gmelin, J.F., 1791; Buccinum strigatum Gmelin, J.F., 1791; Cassis rugosa Röding, P.F., 1798; Phalium flammeolum Link, H.F., 1807; Cassis variegata Perry, G., 1811; Cassis zebra Lamarck, J.B.P.A. de, 1822; Cassis undata "Martini, F.H.W." Deshayes, G.P., 1844; Phalium kuesteri Bayer, F.M., 1935

= Phalium flammiferum =

Species of gastropod

Phalium flammiferum, the striped bonnet, is a species of large sea snail, a marine gastropod mollusk in the family Cassidae, the helmet snails and bonnet snails.

== Description ==
Shells of Phalium flammiferum can reach a size of 41–110 millimetres (1.6–4.3 in). These moderately large shells are oval or globular, with a pointed spire and a smooth surface covered with longitudinal brown to pale brown stripes. Outer lip is denticulate, with large brown bands. The aperture is dark brown.

== Distribution and habitat ==
This species has an Indo-Pacific distribution. It can be found from Japan to Vietnam and in Northern China Seas. It prefers fine sandy substratum at depths of 10 to 50 m.
