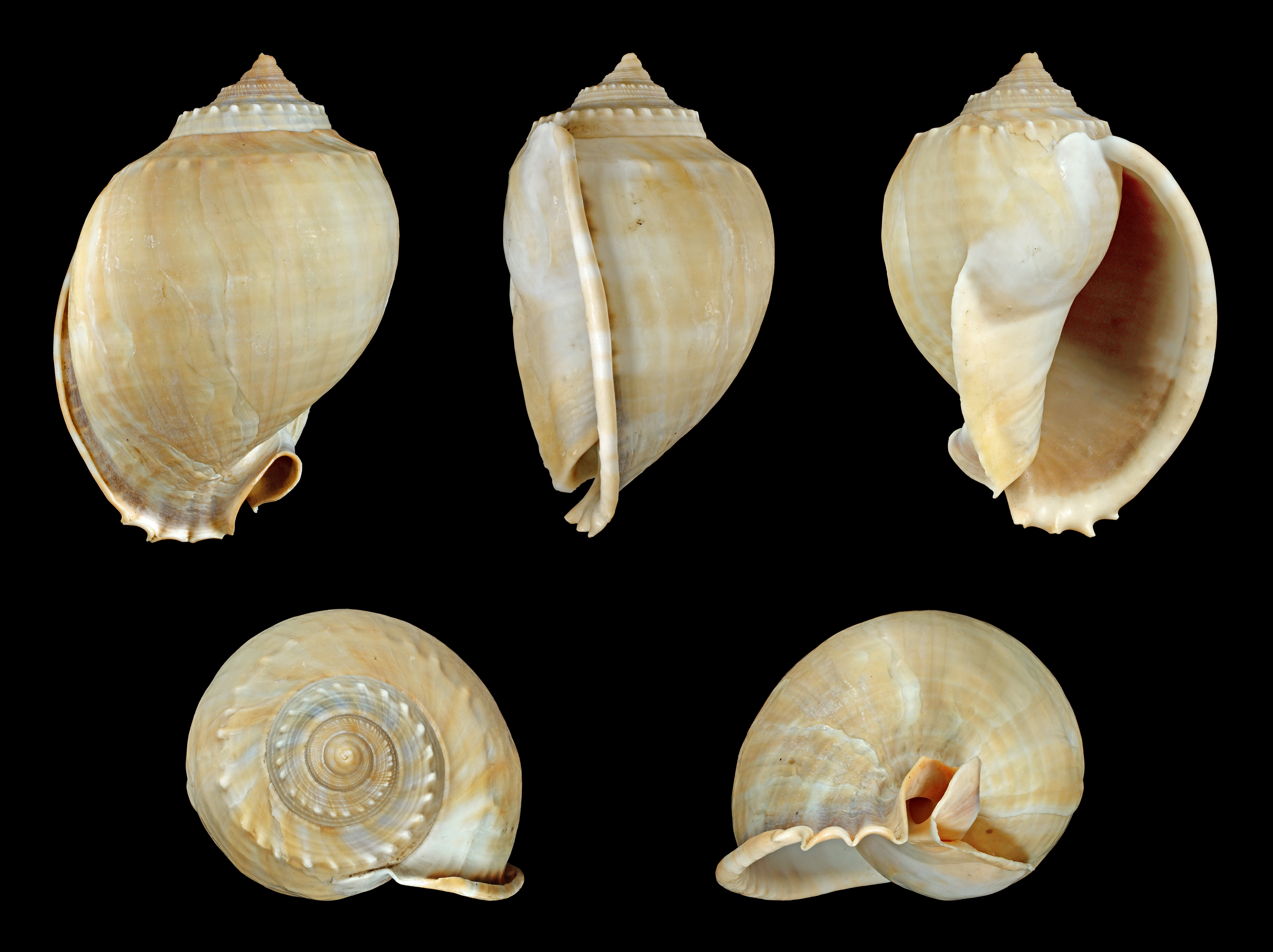
- Five views of a shell of Phalium glaucum (Linné, 1758)

Scientific classification
- Kingdom: Animalia
- Phylum: Mollusca
- Class: Gastropoda
- Subclass: Caenogastropoda
- Order: Littorinimorpha
- Family: Cassidae
- Genus: Phalium
- Species: P. glaucum

Binomial name
- Phalium glaucum (Linnaeus, 1758)

Synonyms
- Bezoardica vulgaris Schumacher, 1817; Buccinum glaucum Linnaeus, 1758 (original combination); Cassidea strigata Shirley, 1911; Cassis bezoar Gray, 1839; Cassis glauca (Linnaeus, 1758)

= Phalium glaucum =

Species of gastropod

Phalium glaucum, common name the grey bonnet or glaucus bonnet, is a species of large sea snail, a marine gastropod mollusk in the family Cassidae, the helmet snails and bonnet snails.

== Distribution ==
This species is widespread in the Indo-Pacific, from Eastern Africa (Madagascar, Mozambique, Tanzania) to Southern Japan and Melanesia.

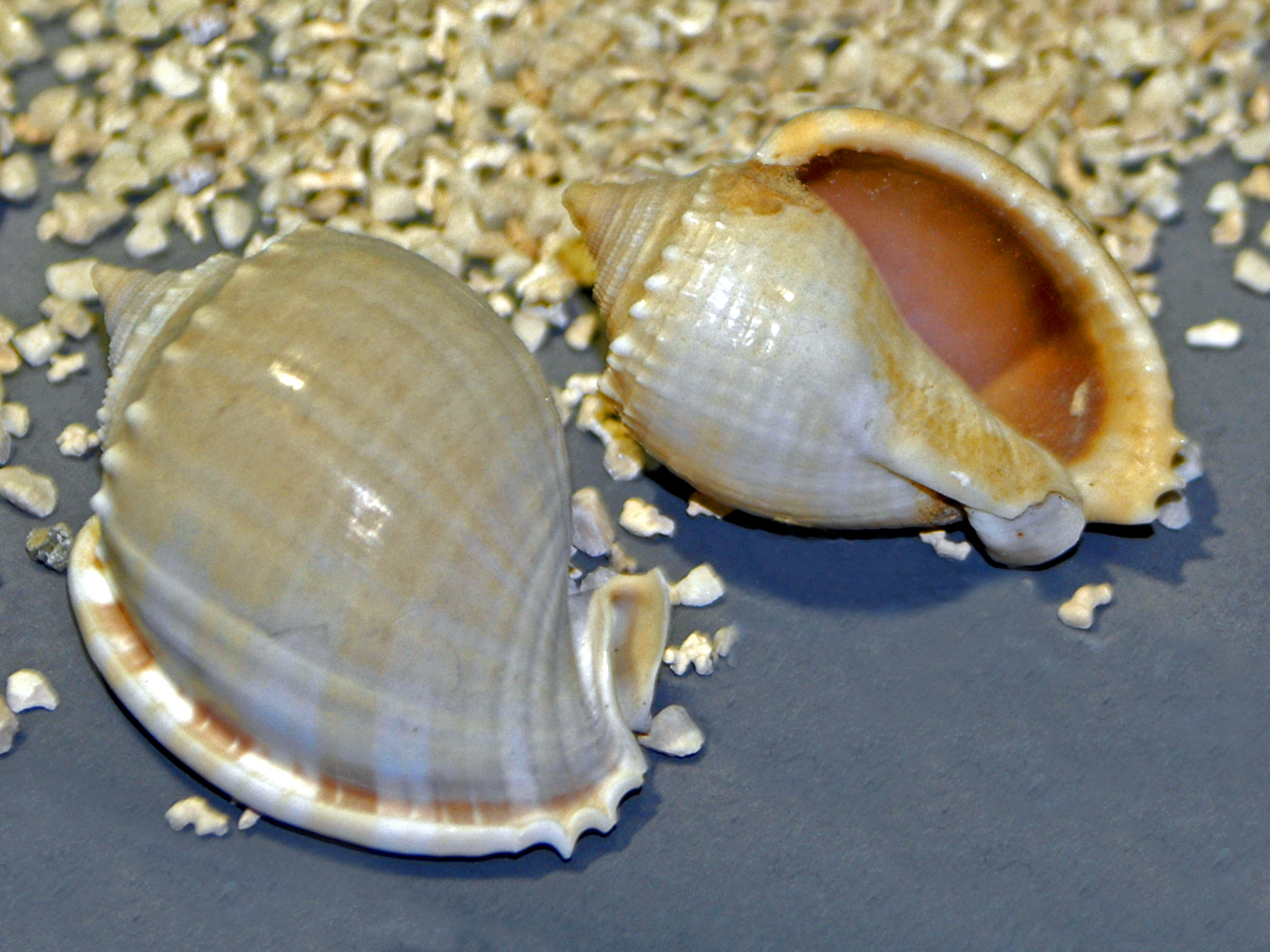
Shells of Phalium glaucum

== Habitat ==
This species lives on sandy bottoms with seagrass meadows, in intertidal and shallow subtidal areas to a depth of about 10 m.

== Description ==
Shell of Phalium glaucum can reach a length of 60–147 millimetres (2.4–5.8 in).

These shells are helmet shaped with a large body whorl and tiny spires. The surface of shell is smooth and uniformly greyish or pale brown. The molluscs have a white body and a large yellowish or whitish foot which is edged in reddish brown. The operculum is bright yellow and fan-shaped. Usually this sea snail buries itself in the sandy areas with the long siphon sticking out.

== Bibliography ==
- Arianna Fulvo and Roberto Nistri (2005). 350 coquillages du monde entier. Delachaux et Niestlé (Paris) : 256 p. (ISBN 2-603-01374-2)
- Tan S.K., Ng H.E. & Nguang L.H.S. (2013) A new species of Phalium Link, 1807 (Gastropoda: Tonnoidea: Cassidae) from the Sunda Shelf. The Raffles Bulletin of Zoology 61(2): 507-514
