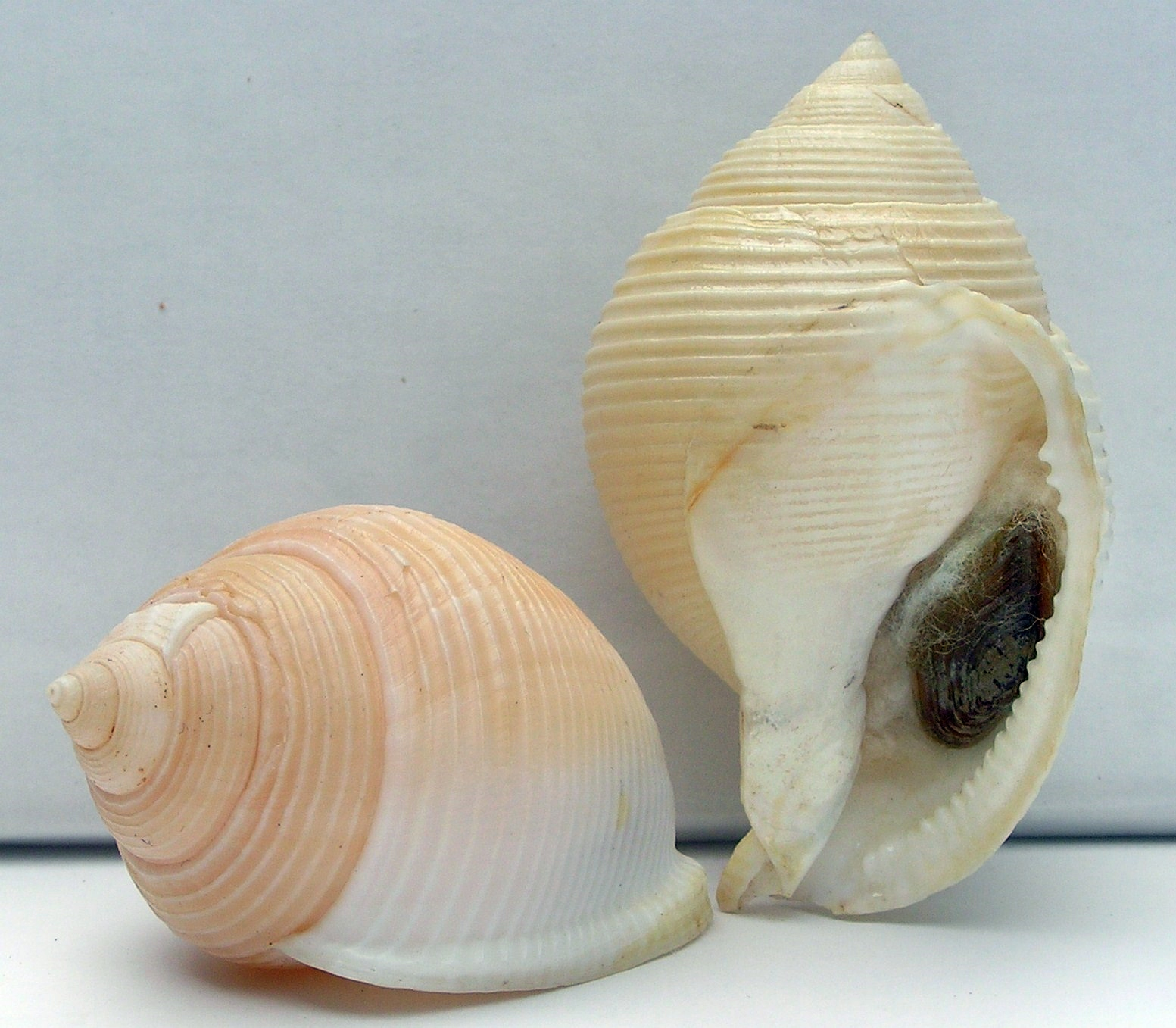

Scientific classification
- Kingdom: Animalia
- Phylum: Mollusca
- Class: Gastropoda
- Subclass: Caenogastropoda
- Order: Littorinimorpha
- Family: Cassidae
- Genus: Galeodea
- Species: G. rugosa

Binomial name
- Galeodea rugosa (Linnaeus, 1771)

Synonyms
- Buccinum rugosum Linnaeus, 1771 (basionym); Buccinum tyrrhenum Gmelin, 1791; Galeodea tyrrhena (Gmelin, 1791)

= Galeodea rugosa =

Species of gastropod

Galeodea rugosa, common name : the rugose bonnet, is a species of large sea snail, a marine gastropod mollusk in the family Cassidae, the helmet snails and bonnet snails.

== Description ==
The shell size varies between 50 mm and 140 mm. The color of the shell varies between an off white to a reddish brown.

== Distribution ==
This species is distributed in European waters along the British Isles, in the Atlantic Ocean along Spain, Portugal, the Azores, and West Africa and in the Mediterranean Sea.
