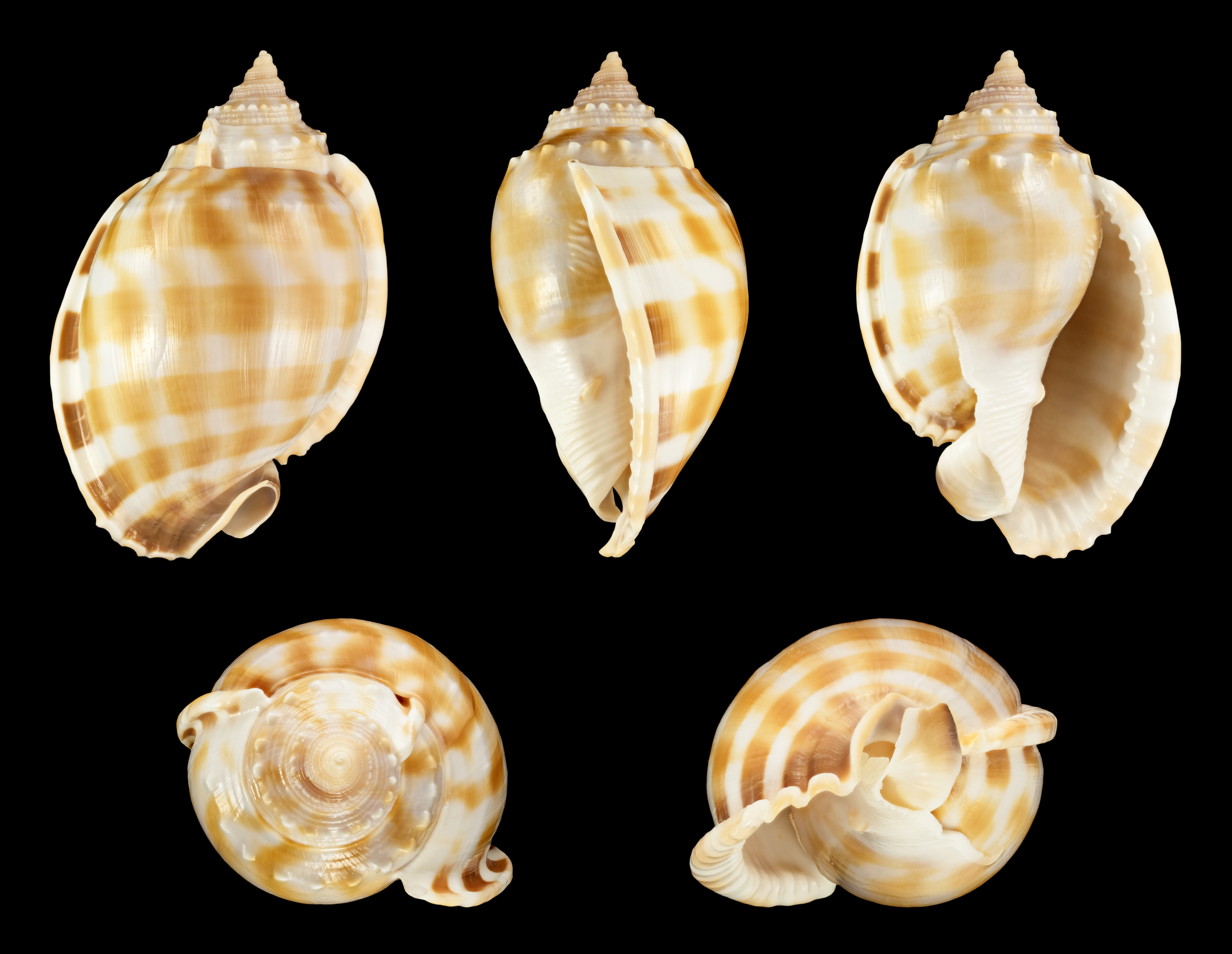
- A shell of Phalium bandatum

Scientific classification
- Kingdom: Animalia
- Phylum: Mollusca
- Class: Gastropoda
- Subclass: Caenogastropoda
- Order: Littorinimorpha
- Family: Cassidae
- Genus: Phalium
- Species: P. bandatum

Binomial name
- Phalium bandatum (Perry, 1811)

Synonyms
- Cassis coronulata Sowerby, G.B. I, 1825; Cassis glauca Bruguière, J.G. in Kiener, L.C., 1835; Cassis muricata Menke, K.T., 1829

= Phalium bandatum =

Banded bonnet

Species of gastropod

Phalium bandatum, common name the banded bonnet, is a species of sea snail, a marine gastropod mollusk in the family Cassidae.

There is one subspecies: Phalium bandatum exaratum (Reeve, 1848)

== Description ==
The size of an adult shell varies between 40 mm and 140 mm.

== Distribution ==
This marine species occurs along the coasts of Japan, the Philippines and Northern Australia.
