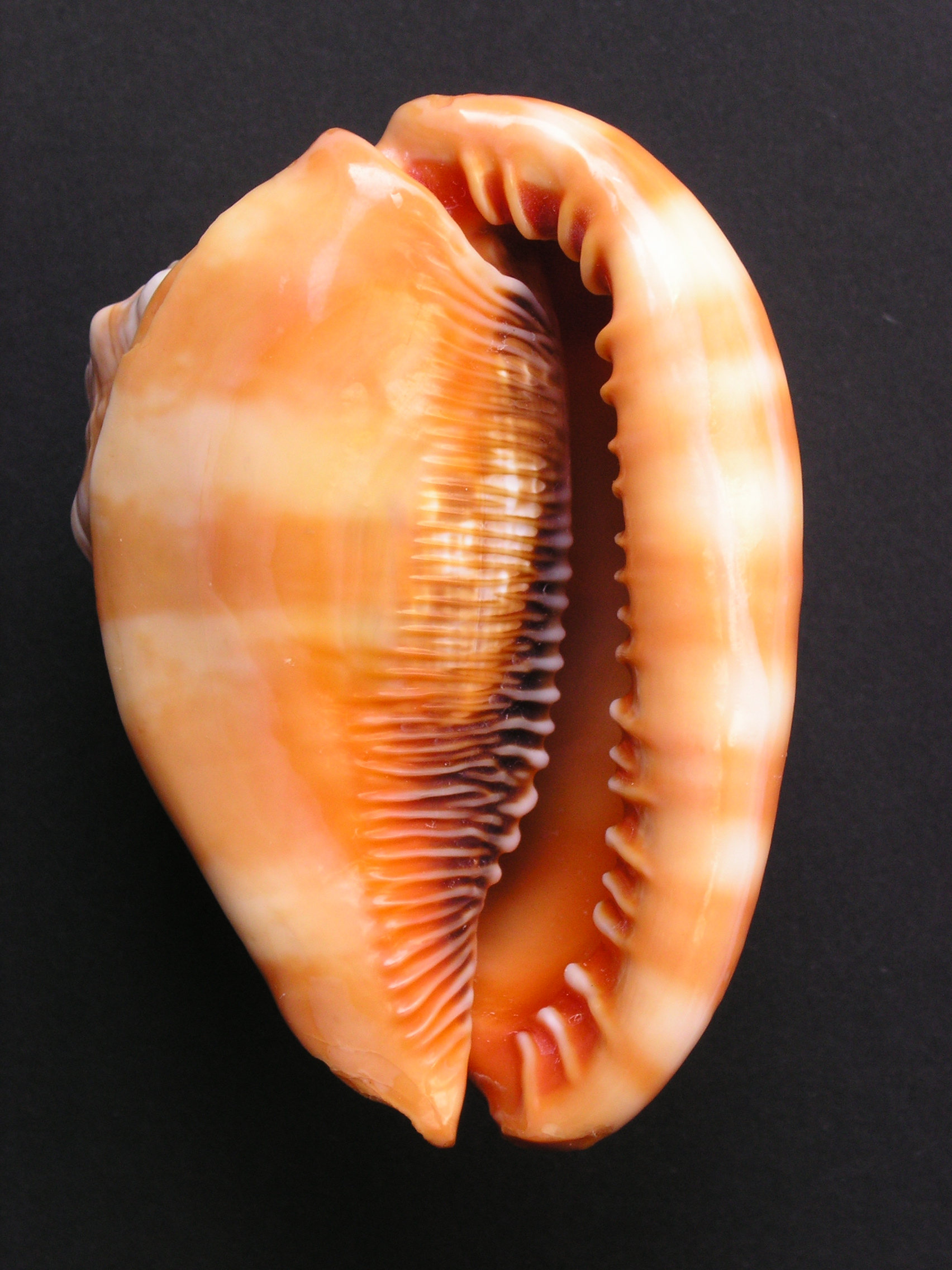
- Ventral view of a shell of Cypraecassis rufa, anterior end facing downwards

Scientific classification
- Kingdom: Animalia
- Phylum: Mollusca
- Class: Gastropoda
- Subclass: Caenogastropoda
- Order: Littorinimorpha
- Family: Cassidae
- Genus: Cypraecassis
- Species: C. rufa

Binomial name
- Cypraecassis rufa (Linnaeus, 1758)

Synonyms
- Cassis rufa Linnaeus, 1758

= Cypraecassis rufa =

Species of gastropod

Cypraecassis rufa is a species of large sea snail, a predatory marine gastropod mollusc in the family Cassidae. It is commonly known as the "bullmouth shell" or "red helmet shell", and also as the "cameo shell". Other names in English include bull's-mouth conch, red helmet and cameo shell. In German it is called "Rote Porzellanschnecke", "Rote Helmschnecke" or "Feuerofen"; and in Japanese, "マンボウガイ". It was classified in 1758 by Carolus Linnaeus, who described it as Buccinum rufum.

The shell of the snail is notable for being a historically popular choice for the production of shell cameos due to its thick shell wall.

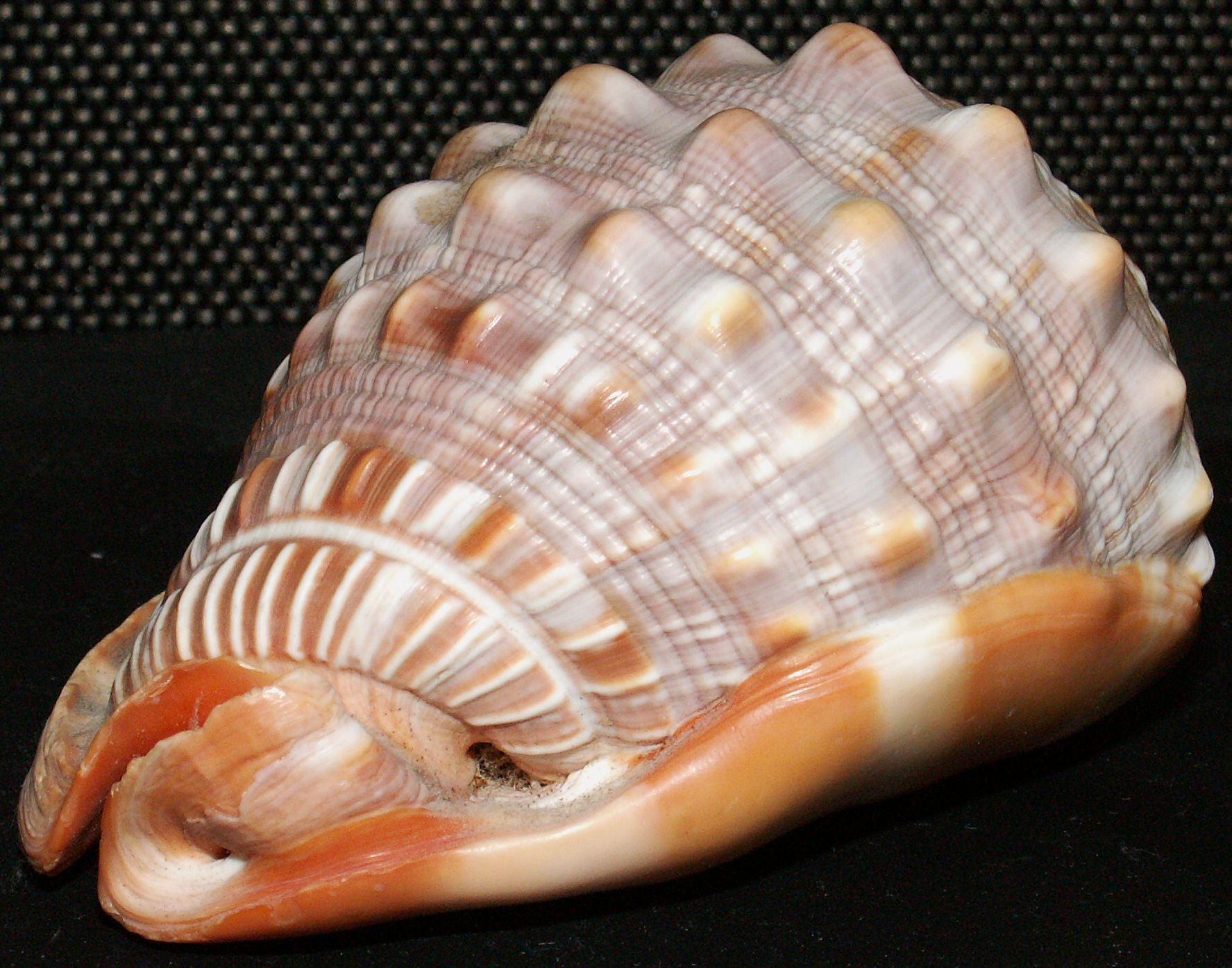
A shell of Cypraecassis rufa. The anterior end is to the lower left.

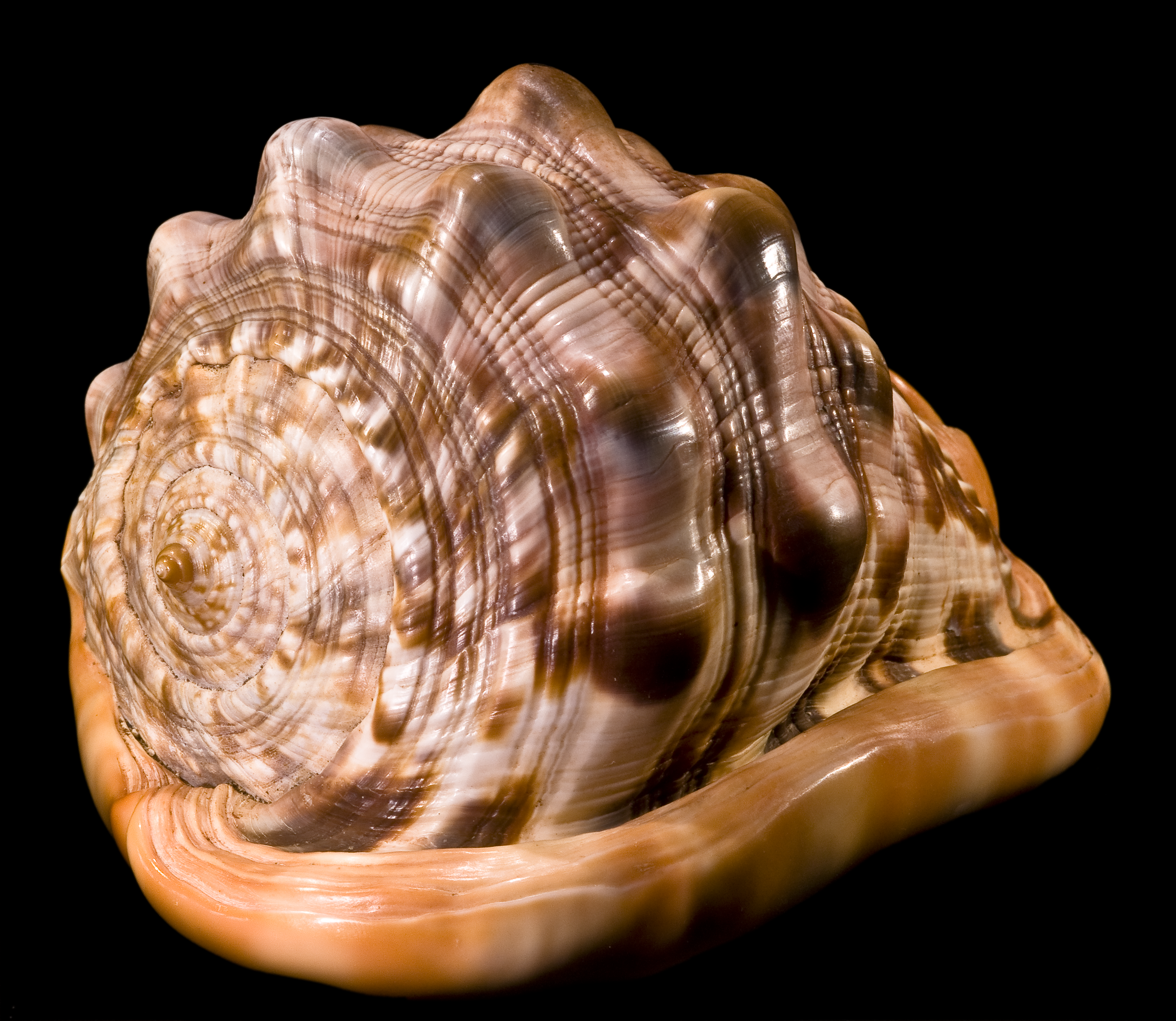
Shell showing posterior end, with spire and protoconch, and right side of the shell

== Description ==
The shell is thick-walled and heavy, roughly oval, and with a surface featuring three or four strongly nodular rows and spiral bands in grooves, clearly visible; orange and cream to reddish-brown in color, with lighter to gray spots. The inner and outer lips are glossy and marked by raised white teeth. The operculum is relatively small, only about 1/10th the length of the aperture.

The adult shell of this species can grow to be as large as 7 1/2 inches (185 mm) in length.

== Distribution ==
This species is found along many shores of the Indo-Pacific, a biogeographic region comprising the tropical waters of the Indian Ocean, the western and central Pacific Ocean, and the seas connecting the two. It prefers sandy substrates near coral reefs, where it is a predator on sea urchins.

The species has been observed from the coasts of East Africa to Polynesia; including Madagascar, Sri Lanka and the tropical islands of the Indian Ocean, through Indonesia and Melanesia to Polynesia; along China's coast as far north as Taiwan, also in southern Japan, northern Queensland, and the Fiji Islands, but has not been found in Micronesia, Hawaii or the coasts of India.

This species is found off the southern African coast from northern KwaZulu-Natal and Mozambique. It is more common in Mozambique. It is also a common shell to find on the shores of Kenya.
