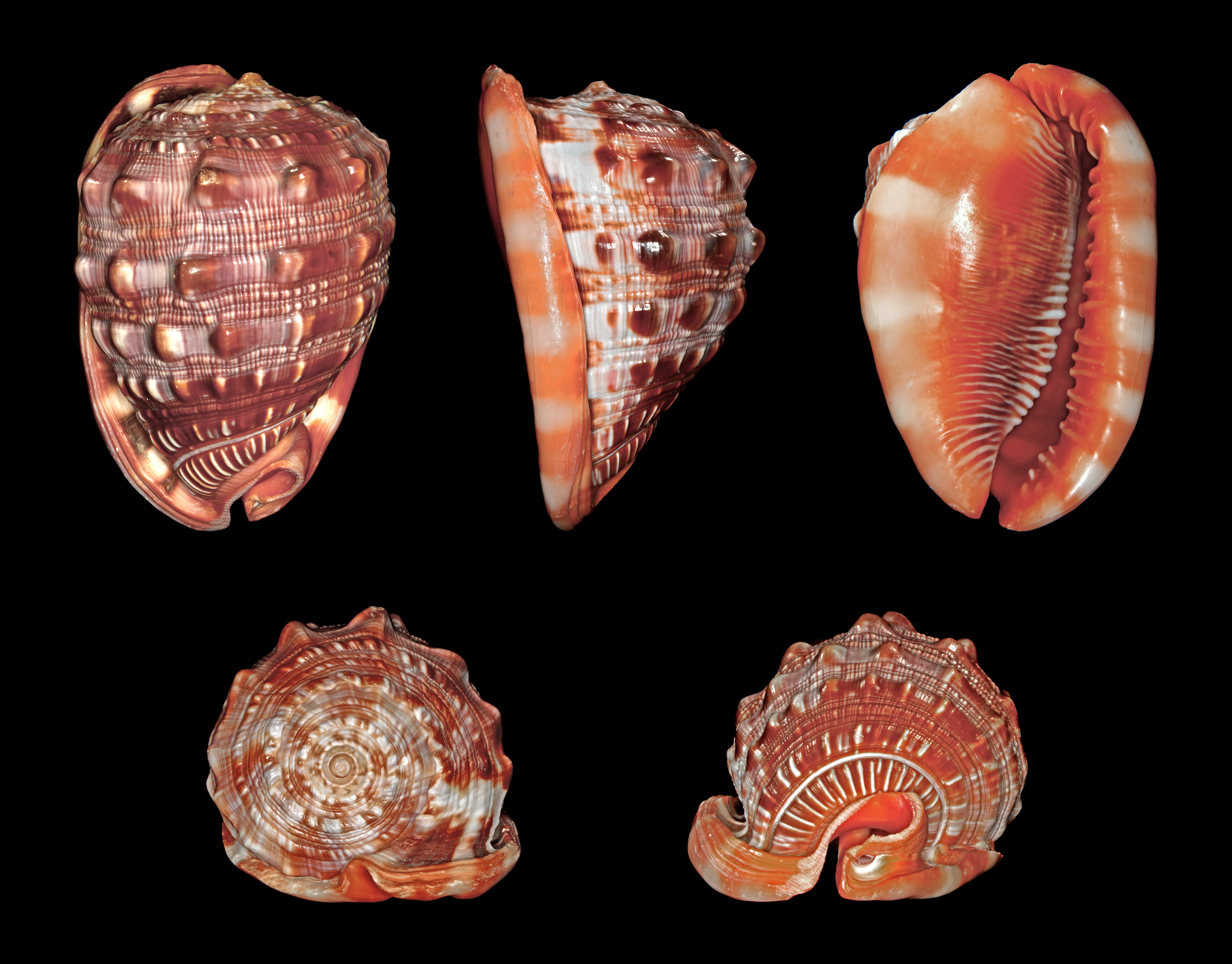
- Five views of a shell of Cypraecassis rufa

Scientific classification
- Kingdom: Animalia
- Phylum: Mollusca
- Class: Gastropoda
- Subclass: Caenogastropoda
- Order: Littorinimorpha
- Family: Cassidae
- Subfamily: Cassinae
- Genus: Cypraecassis; Stutchbury, 1837

= Cypraecassis =

Cypraecassis Temporal range: Miocene—Present

Genus of gastropods

Cypraecassis is a genus of medium-sized to large sea snails, marine gastropod molluscs in the family Cassidae.

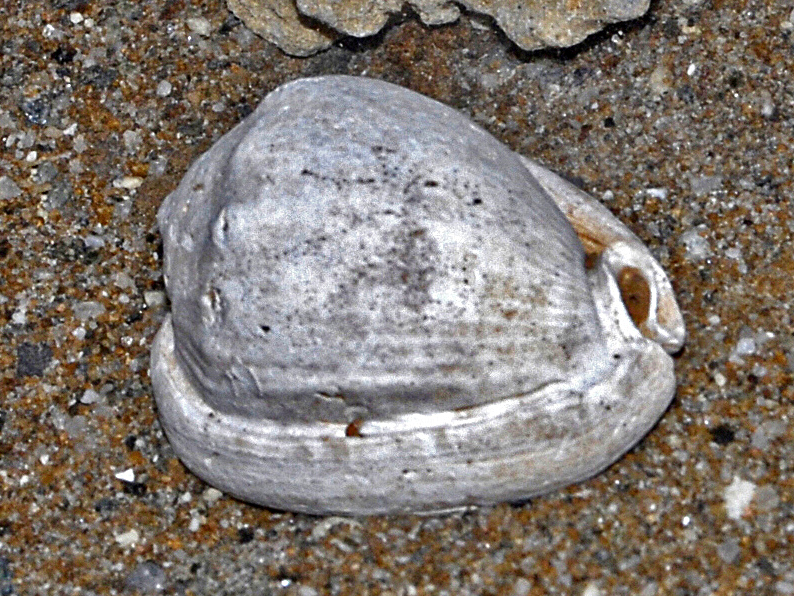
Fossil of Cypraecassis pseudocrumena from Pliocene of Italy

== Fossil record ==
Fossils of Cypraecassis are found in marine strata from the Miocene until the Quaternary (age range: from 15.97 to 0.012 million years ago.). Fossils are known from various localities in Europe, Central America and India.

== Species ==
Species within the genus Cypraecassis include:

- Cypraecassis coarctata (Sowerby I, 1825)
- Cypraecassis rufa (Linnaeus, 1758)
- Cypraecassis tenuis (Wood, 1828)
- Cypraecassis testiculus (Linnaeus, 1758)
  - Cypraecassis testiculus senegalica
- Cypraecassis wilmae Kreipl & Alf, 2000
