= Parietal callus =

Shell anatomy of some groups of snails

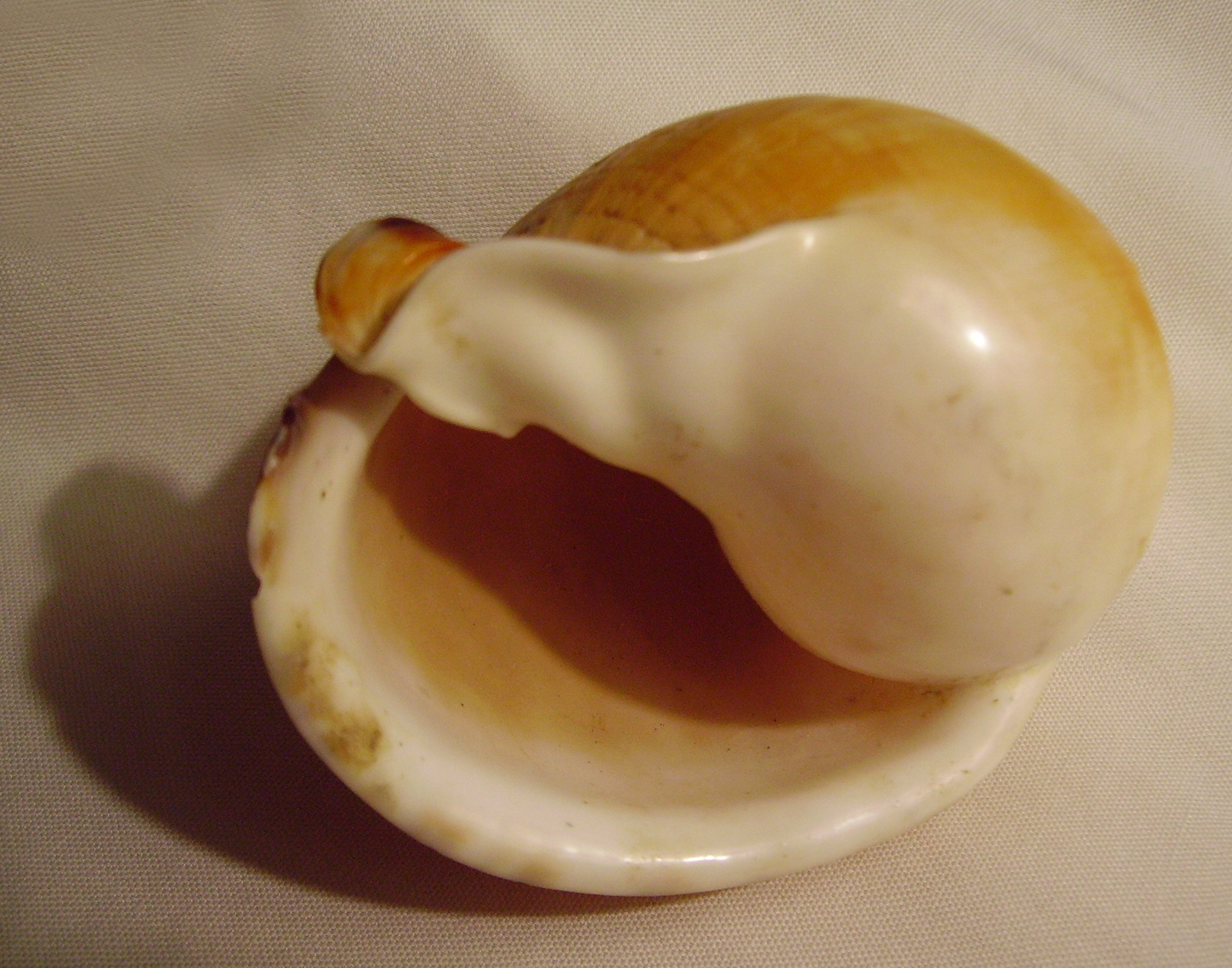
The shell of Semicassis pyrum has a large parietal callus, at the top in this image

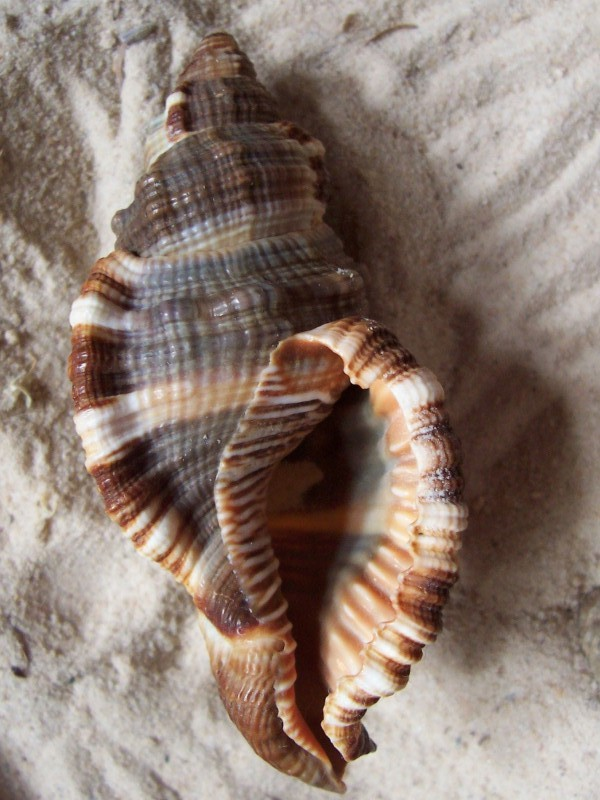
The shell of Cymatium pileare has a narrow parietal callus around the surface of the aperture nearest the columella, on the left of the shell opening as it is shown here

A parietal callus is a feature of the shell anatomy of some groups of snails, i.e. gastropods. It is a thickened calcareous deposit which may be present on the parietal wall of the aperture of the adult shell. The parietal wall is the margin of the aperture and part of the wall of the body whorl that is closest to the columella. The callus is often smooth and glossy, but can also be decorated with raised ribs or wrinkles.

This feature is found in such marine families as Ranellidae (pictured), Cassidae, Nassariidae, Ringiculidae and others. It is also found in some families of land snails, terrestrial pulmonates.

The callus is often "glazed", to help the animal slide in and out of the shell more easily.

When the callus covers of 50% of the surface area of the ventral part of the shell, it is called an "extreme parietal callus".

== See also ==
- Gastropod shell
- Aperture (mollusc)
