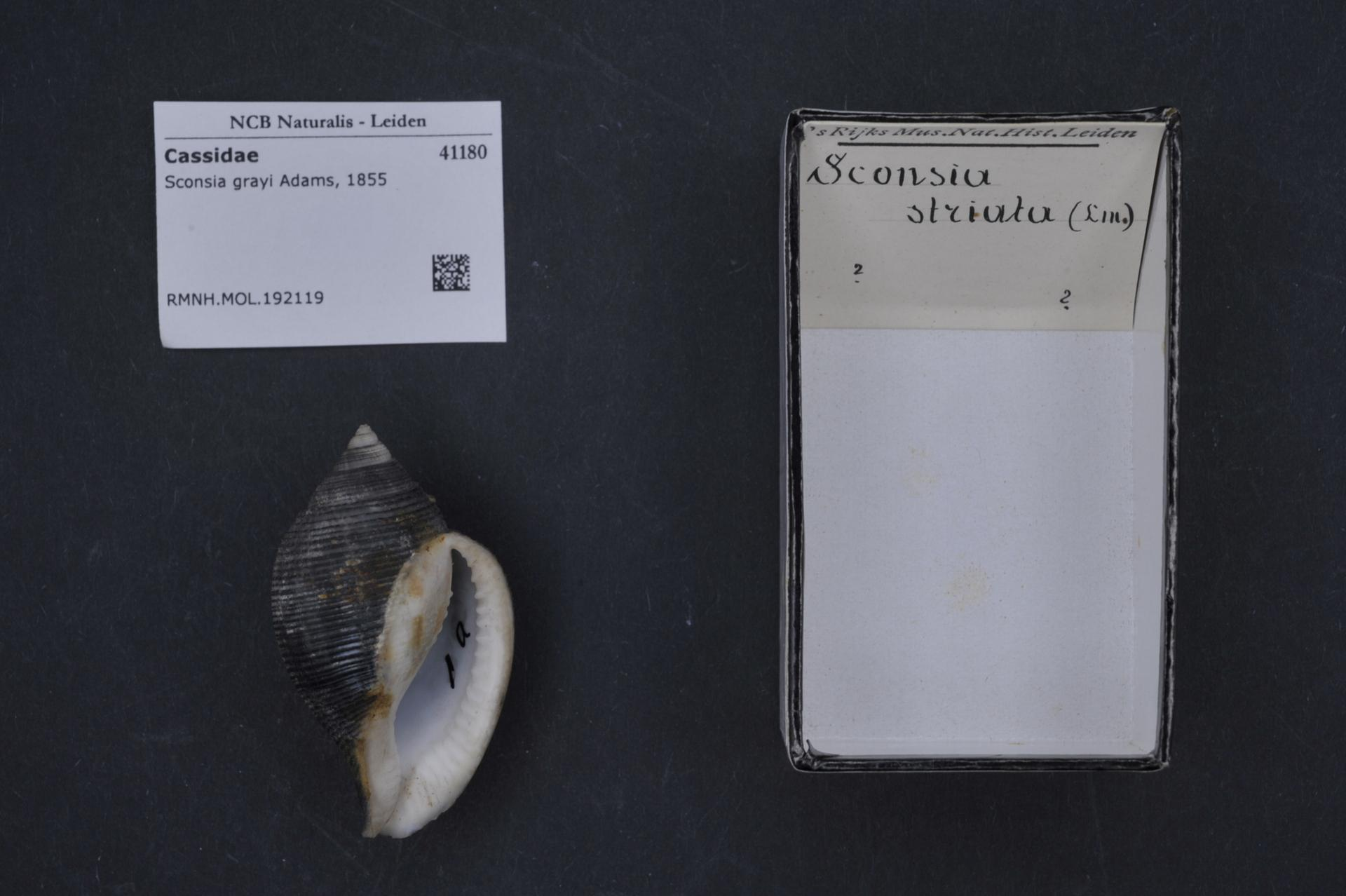
- Sconsia grayi

Scientific classification
- Kingdom: Animalia
- Phylum: Mollusca
- Class: Gastropoda
- Subclass: Caenogastropoda
- Order: Littorinimorpha
- Family: Cassidae
- Genus: Sconsia; Gray, 1847

= Sconsia =

Genus of gastropods

Sconsia is a genus of large sea snails, marine gastropod mollusks in the family Cassidae, the helmet snails and bonnet snails.

== Species ==
Species within the genus Sconsia include:

- Sconsia striata
- Sconsia nephele
