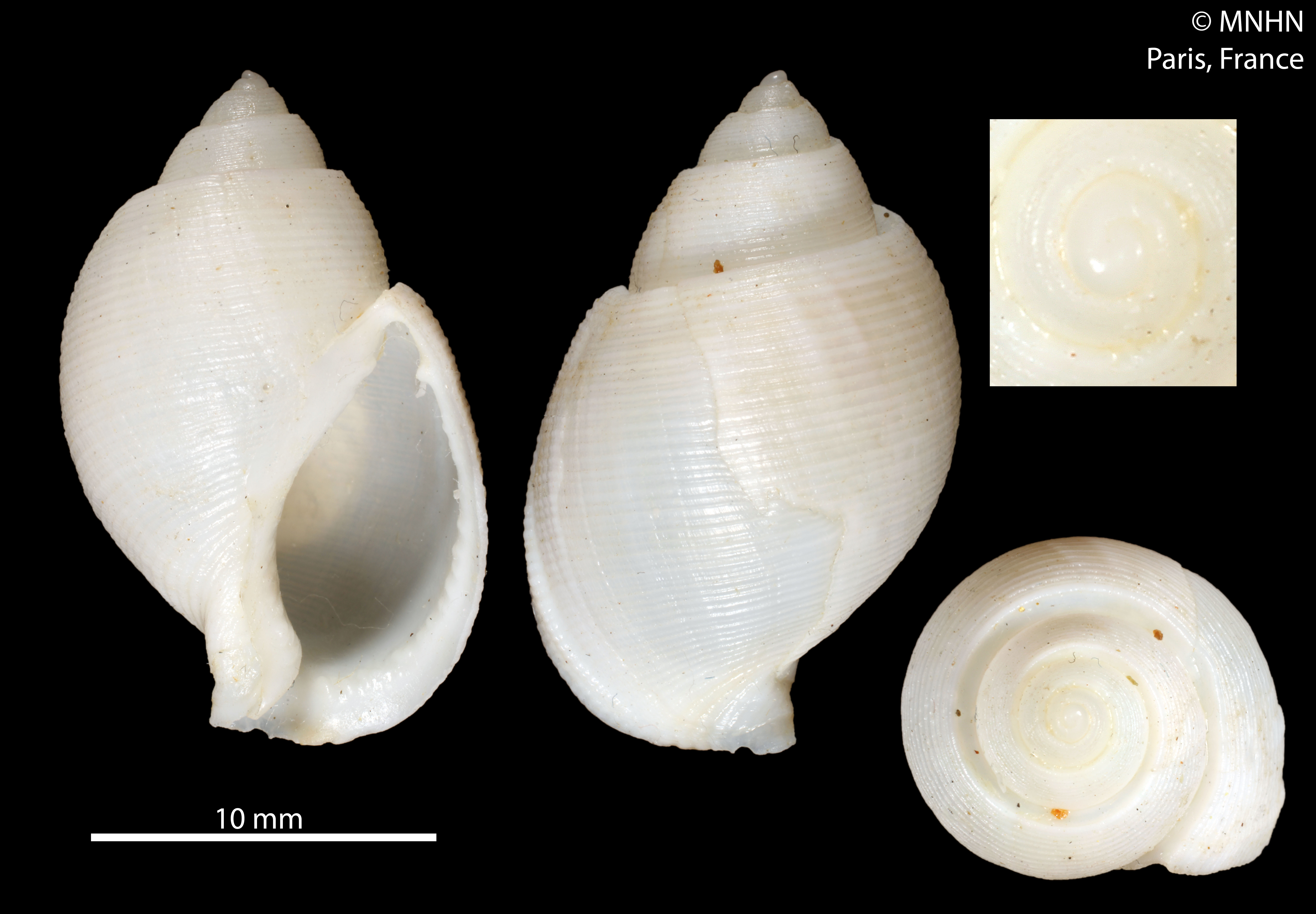
- Microsconsia limpusi

Scientific classification
- Kingdom: Animalia
- Phylum: Mollusca
- Class: Gastropoda
- Subclass: Caenogastropoda
- Order: Littorinimorpha
- Superfamily: Tonnoidea
- Family: Cassidae
- Genus: Microsconsia; Beu, 2008

Type species
- Microsconsia limpusi Beu, 2008

= Microsconsia =

Genus of gastropods

Microsconsia is a genus of medium-sized sea snails, marinegastropod mollusks in the family Cassidae, the helmet snails and bonnet snails.

== Species ==
Species within the genus Microsconsia include:

- Microsconsia limpusi Beu, 2008
