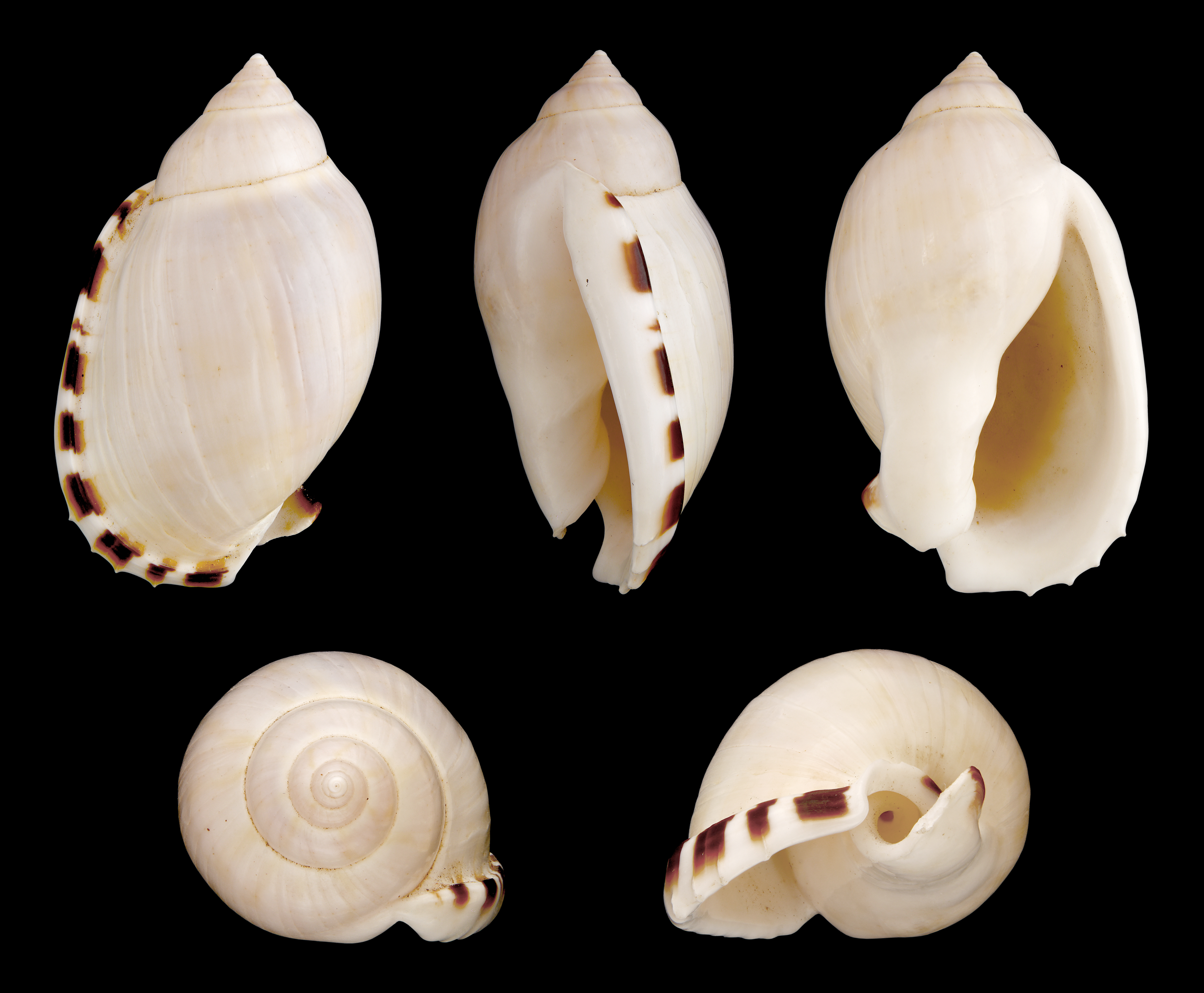
- Five views of a shell of Casimaria erinanceus
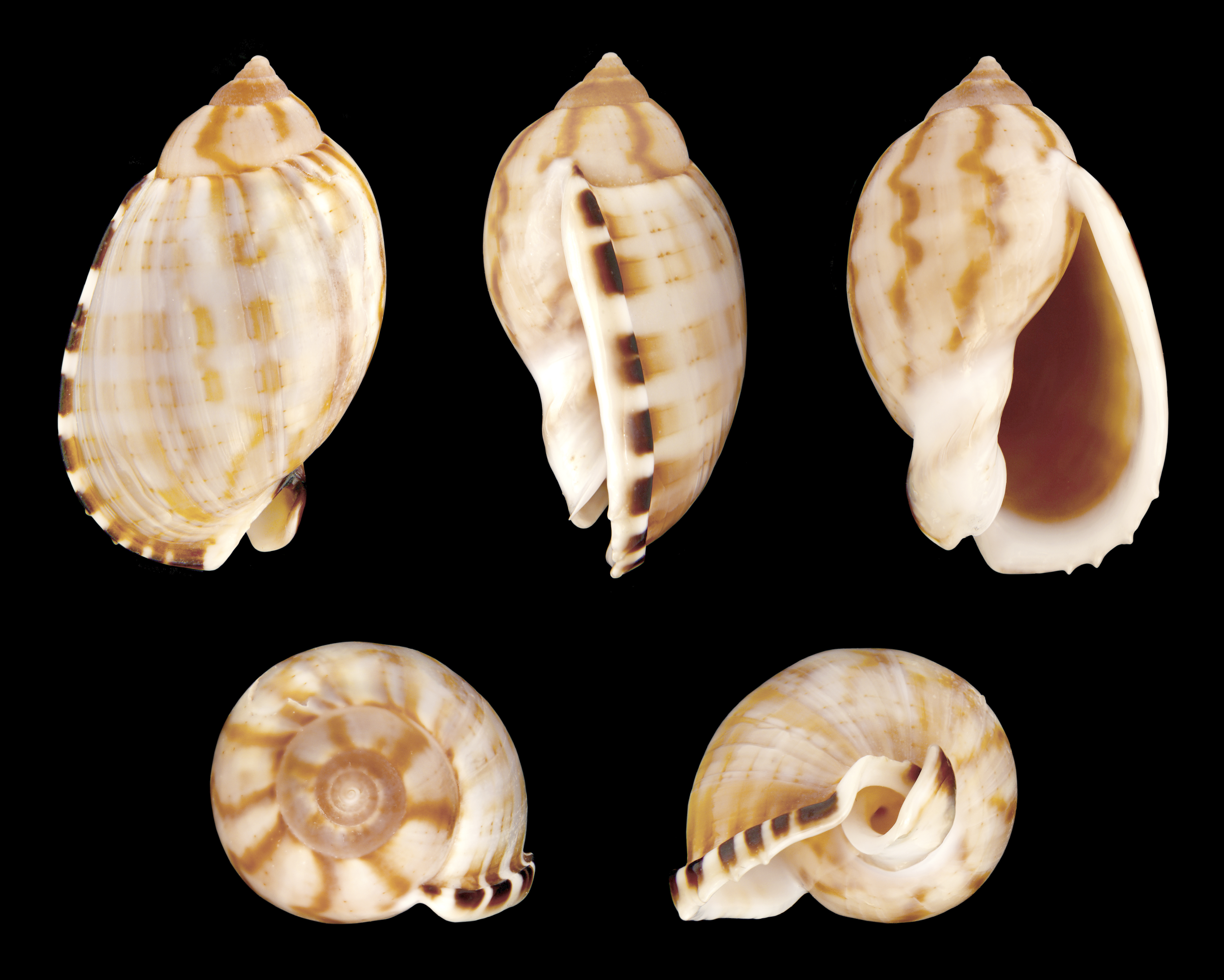
- Five views of a shell of Casimaria erinanceus form vibex

Scientific classification
- Kingdom: Animalia
- Phylum: Mollusca
- Class: Gastropoda
- Subclass: Caenogastropoda
- Order: Littorinimorpha
- Family: Cassidae
- Genus: Casmaria
- Species: C. erinaceus

Binomial name
- Casmaria erinaceus (Linnaeus, 1758)

Synonyms
- Buccinum erinaceus Linnaeus, 1758 (original combination); Buccinum meles Dillwyn, 1817; Buccinum vibex Linnaeus, 1758; Casmaria erinacea (misspelling); Casmaria erinaceus erinaceus (Linnaeus, 1758); Casmaria vibexmexicana (Stearns, 1894); Cassis (Casmaria) vibexmexicana Stearns, 1894; Cassis denticulata Röding, P.F., 1798; Cassis ventricosa Rigacci, 1866; Cassis vibex (Linnaeus, 1758); Cassis vibexmexicana Stearns, 1894; Murex torosus Lamarck, J.B.P.A. de, 1816; Phalium edentulum Link, H.F., 1807; Phalium vibex (Linnaeus, 1758)

= Casmaria erinaceus =

Species of gastropod

Casmaria erinaceus, common name : the common bonnet, is a species of large sea snail, a marine gastropod mollusk in the family Cassidae, the helmet snails and bonnet snails.

== Description ==
The size of an adult shell varies between 20 mm and 79 mm.

== Distribution ==
This species occurs in the Red Sea, in the Indian Ocean along Aldabra, Madagascar, the Mascarene Basin, and Mauritius; in the Pacific Ocean along Melanesia, Micronesia, and the Philippines.
