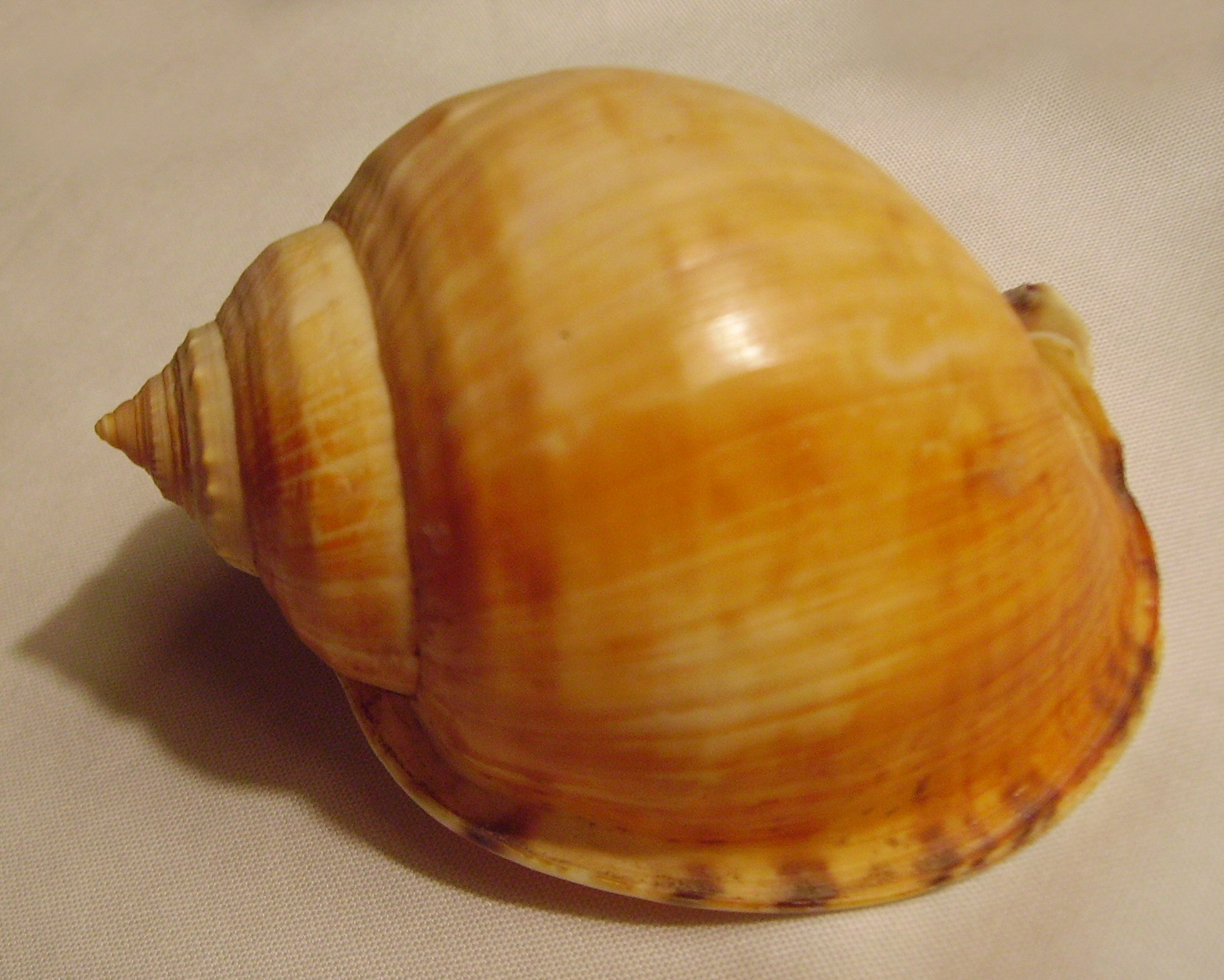
- A shell of Semicassis pyrum, lateral view

Scientific classification
- Kingdom: Animalia
- Phylum: Mollusca
- Class: Gastropoda
- Subclass: Caenogastropoda
- Order: Littorinimorpha
- Family: Cassidae
- Genus: Semicassis
- Species: S. pyrum

Binomial name
- Semicassis pyrum (Lamarck,1822)

Synonyms
- † Cassidea multisecta H. J. Finlay, 1924; Cassidea stadialis Hedley, 1914; Cassis nivea Brazier, 1872; Cassis pirum; Cassis pyrum Lamarck, 1822; † Cassis striatus F. W. Hutton, 1873; Cassis tumida Petterd, 1886; Phalium pyrum (Lamarck, 1822); Phalium stadiale (Hedley, 1914); Semicassis (Semicassis) pyrum (Lamarck, 1822); Semicassis pyrum f. hamiltoni (A. W. B. Powell, 1928); Semicassis pyrum pyrum (Lamarck, 1822); Xenogalea denda Cotton, 1945; Xenogalea finlayi Iredale, 1927; Xenogalea halli Cotton, 1954; Xenogalea mawsoni Cotton, 1945; Xenogalea powelli H. J. Finlay, 1928; Xenogalea pyrum (Lamarck, 1822); Xenogalea spectabilis Iredale, 1929; Xenogalea stadialis (Hedley, 1914); Xenogalea wilsoni Cotton, 1954; Xenophalium (Xenogalea) abernethyi Dell, 1956; Xenophalium (Xenogalea) matai A. W. B. Powell, 1952; Xenophalium abernethyi Dell, 1956; Xenophalium finlayi (Iredale, 1927); Xenophalium hamiltoni A. W. B. Powell, 1928; Xenophalium harrisonae A. W. B. Powell, 1928; Xenophalium matai A. W. B. Powell, 1952; Xenophalium pyrum (Lamarck, 1822); Xenophalium pyrum pyrum (Lamarck, 1822); Xenophalium wanganuiense A. W. B. Powell, 1928

= Semicassis pyrum =

Species of gastropod

Semicassis pyrum, common name the "pear bonnet" or "common helmet", is a species of large sea snail, a marine gastropod mollusc in the family Cassidae, the helmet shells, bonnet shells and their allies.

== Description ==
The shell has a light colour with a biconic shape, a notable large aperture, and ridges along the spire.

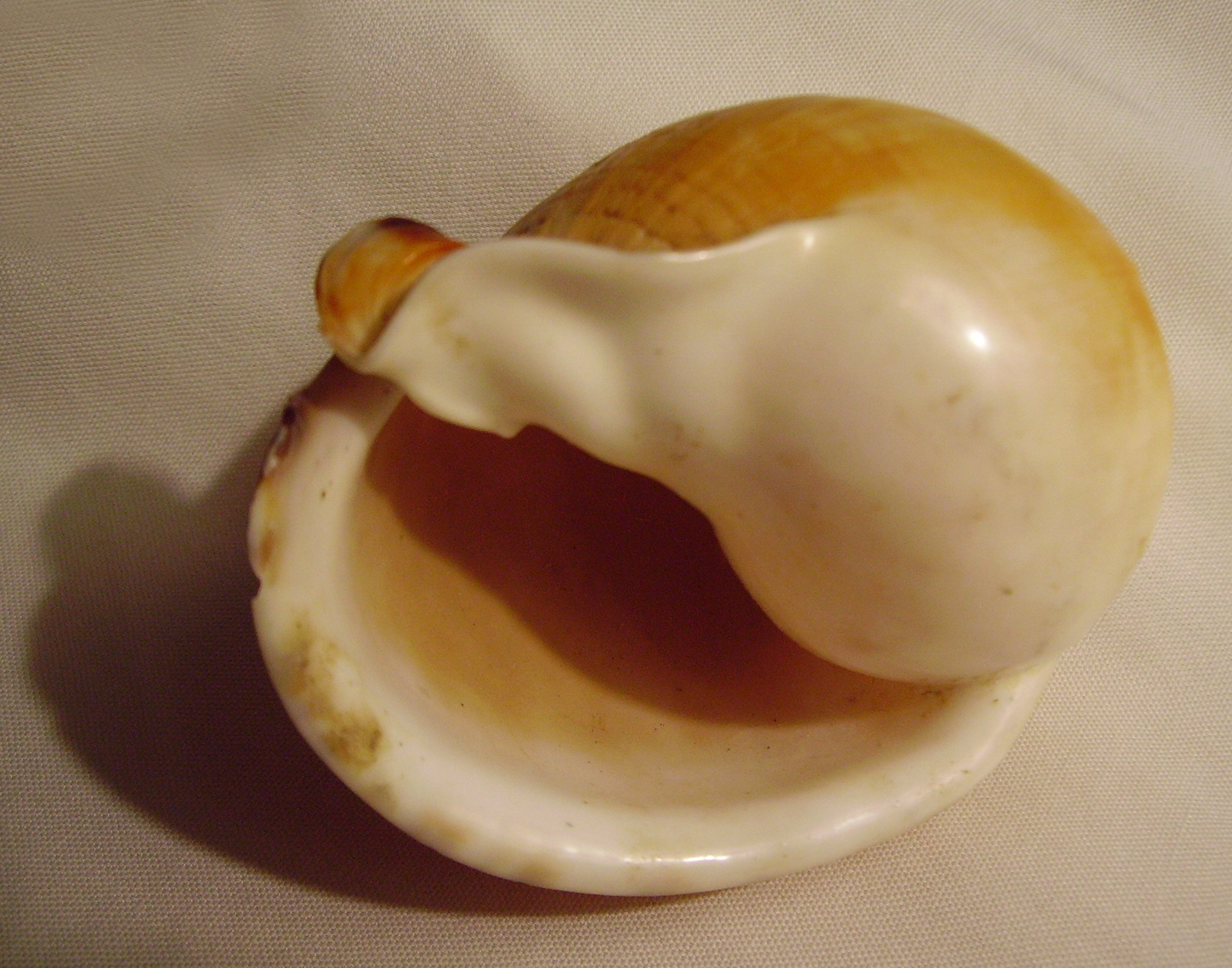
A shell of Semicassis pyrum, ventral view showing the parietal callus
