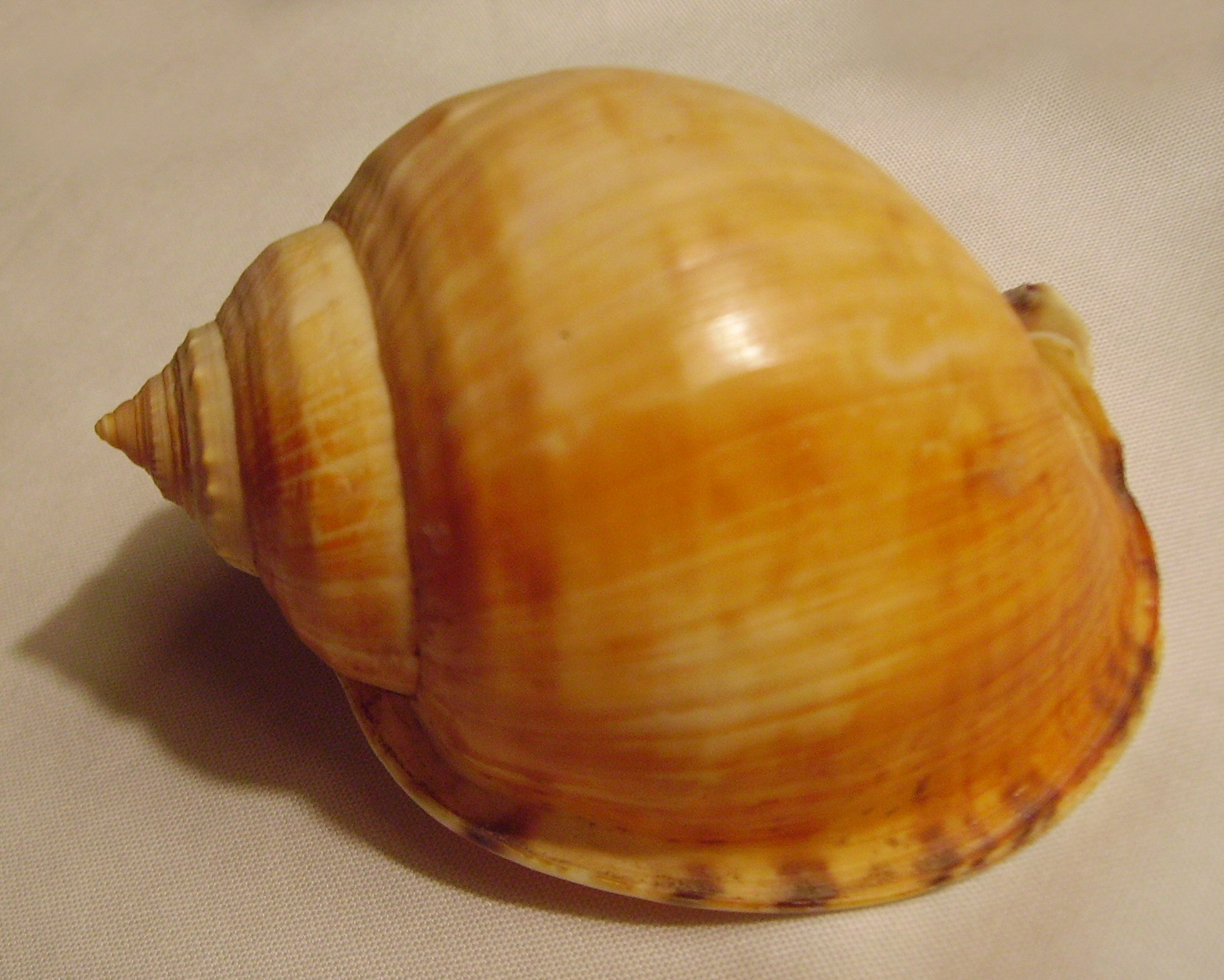
- Lateral view of a shell of Semicassis pyrum

Scientific classification
- Kingdom: Animalia
- Phylum: Mollusca
- Class: Gastropoda
- Subclass: Caenogastropoda
- Order: Littorinimorpha
- Superfamily: Tonnoidea
- Family: Cassidae; Latreille, 1825

Synonyms
- Cassididae Gyllenhal, 1813; Oocorythidae P. Fischer, 1885

= Cassidae =

Family of gastropods

The Cassidae are a taxonomic family of medium-sized, large, and sometimes very large sea snails commonly called helmet snails or bonnet snails. These are marine gastropod mollusks in the superfamily Tonnoidea and the clade Littorinimorpha.

About 60 species comprise the family Cassidae; an example is Cypraecassis rufa.

== Nomenclature ==
Despite its incorrect formation (the correct one would be Cassididae, based on the genitive form of Cassis), the ICZN has placed the name Cassidae Latreille, 1825 on the official list of family names, therefore avoiding homonymy with Cassididae Stephens, 1831 (based on Cassida Linnaeus, 1758, a chrysomelid beetle); Opinion 1023 (1974, Bulletin of Zoological Nomenclature 31: 127–129).

== Distribution ==
Species of this family occur in tropical and temperate seas from the intertidal zone to depths of 100 m (330 ft), buried in the sand during the day and becoming active at night.

== Shell description ==
Members of this family are shaped rather like bonnets or helmets, as their common name suggests. The shells are large, thick, subglobular with dextrally coiled, sometimes varicose, whorls, and a short spire. The coiling may be trochospiral or convoluted. The shells of many species have great variability, which has led to many misidentifications, resulting in many synonyms.

Many species have a large and solid shield over the parietal body or beside the thick, plicated columella. Many species show blunt knobs and thickened axial ridges, known as varices. The thin, horny operculum is oval in shape and covers a long aperture. The siphonal canal is straight or slightly curved. The outer lip is somewhat thicker at its margin and toothed on the inside.

== Anatomy ==
These snails have a large mantle and a large, muscular foot. Their large head has an extensible snout. The eyes are at the base of the single pair of tentacles.

== Feeding habits ==
Helmet bonnets prey on echinoderms (especially sea urchins), starting by gripping them using the foot. The snail then makes a hole in the urchin through the combined action of a secretion which is rich in sulfuric acid and by rasping with their radula. The acid secretion is provided by two large proboscis glands.

== Taxonomy ==
In their taxonomy of the Gastropoda of 2005 Bouchet & Rocroi still listed Cassidae as Cassinae Latreille, 1825, a subfamily of Tonnidae Suter, 1913 (1825), following in this Riedel (1995). In his "Revision of the deep-water Cassidae" however, Beu raised in 2008 Cassinae to the rank of family.

== Genera ==
Genera within the family include:

- Casmaria H. Adams and A. Adams, 1853
- Cassis Scopoli, 1777
- Cypraecassis Stutchbury, 1837
- Dalium Dall, 1889
- Echinophoria Sacco, 1890
- Eucorys Beu, 2008
- Galeodea Link, 1807
- Microsconsia Beu, 2008
- Oocorys P. Fischer, 1883
- Phalium Link, 1807 - bonnet shells
- Sconsia Gray, 1847
- Semicassis Mörch, 1852

Genera brought into synonymy

- Bathygalea Woodring & Olsson, 1957: synonym of Echinophoria Sacco, 1890
- Benthodolium Verrill & Smith [in Verrill], 1884: synonym of Oocorys P. Fischer, 1884
- Bezoardica Schumacher, 1817: synonym of Phalium Link, 1807
- Bezoardicella Habe, 1961: synonym of Phalium Link, 1807
- Cassidaria Lamarck, 1816: synonym of Galeodea Link, 1807
- Cassidea Bruguière, 1789: synonym of Cassis Scopoli, 1777
- Echinora Schumacher, 1817: synonym of Galeodea Link, 1807
- Euspinacassis Finlay, 1926: synonym of Echinophoria Sacco, 1890
- Galeoocorys Kuroda & Habe, 1957: synonym of Galeodea Link, 1807
- Hadroocorys Quinn, 1980: synonym of Oocorys P. Fischer, 1884
- Morio Montfort, 1810: synonym of Galeodea Link, 1807
- Taieria Finlay & Marwick, 1937: synonym of Galeodea Link, 1807
- † Trachydolium Howe, 1926: synonym of Echinophoria Sacco, 1890
- Xenogalea Iredale, 1927: synonym of Semicassis Mörch, 1852
- Xenophalium Iredale, 1927: synonym of Semicassis Mörch, 1852
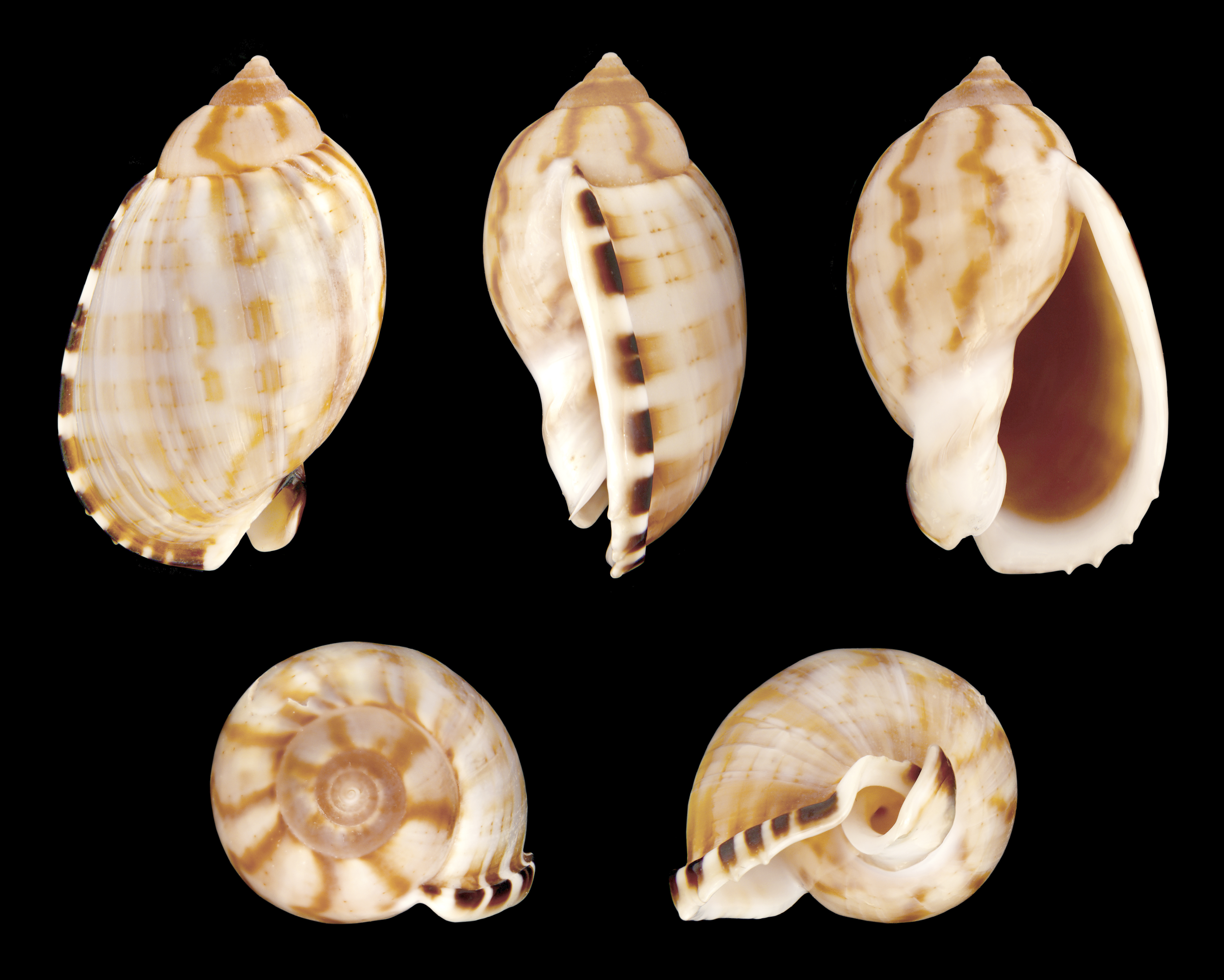
Casmaria erinaceus

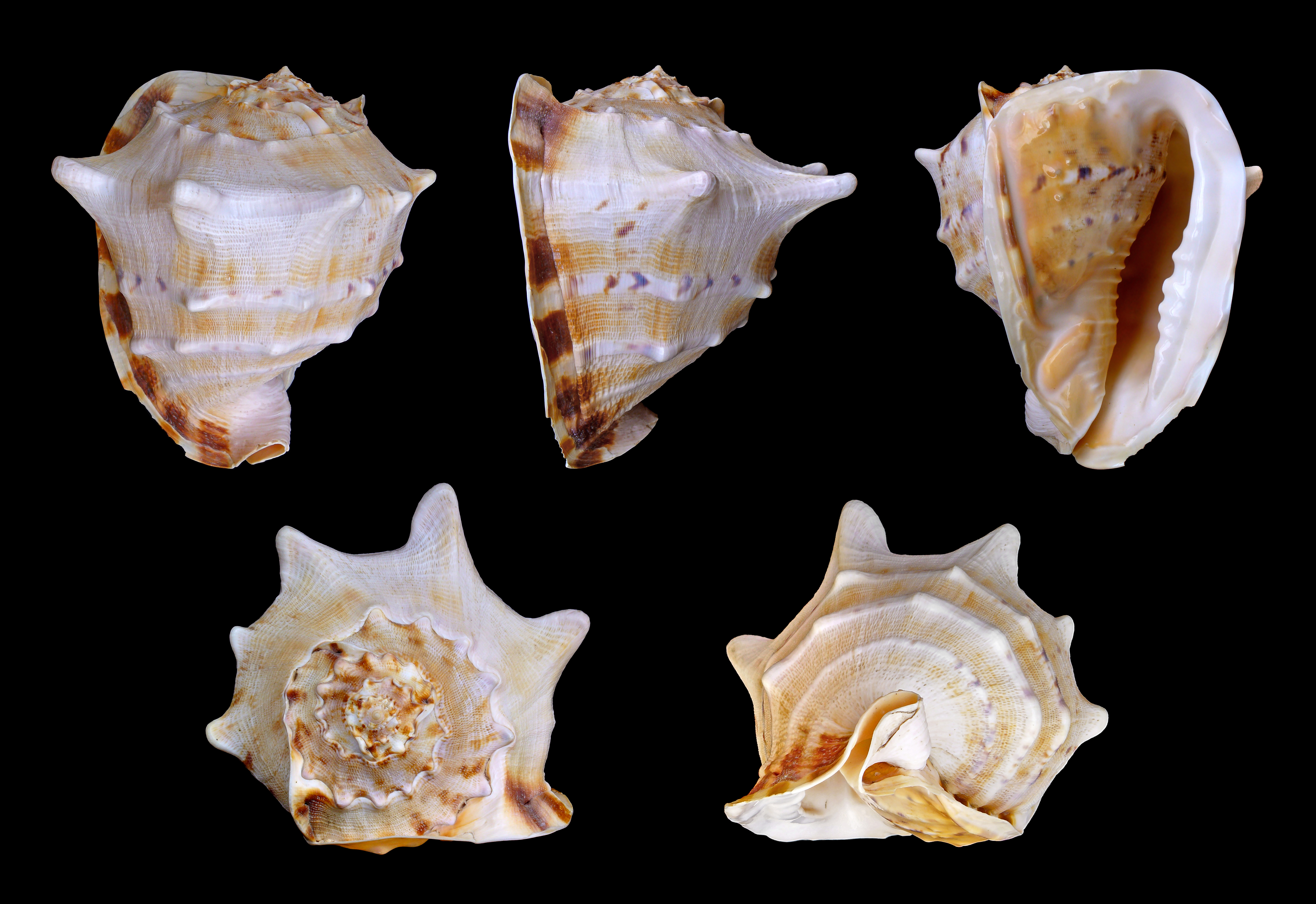
Cassis cornuta

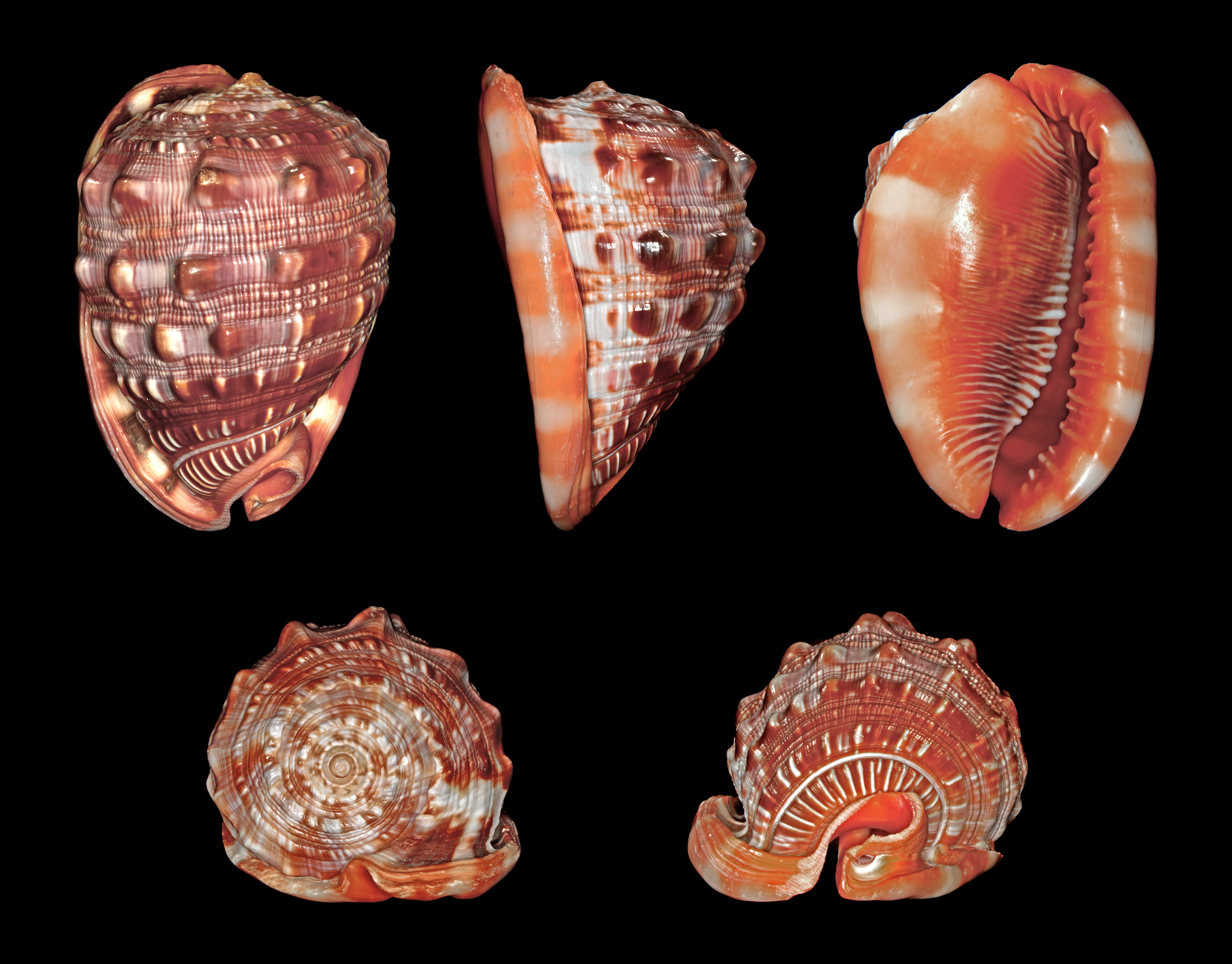
Cypraecassis rufa

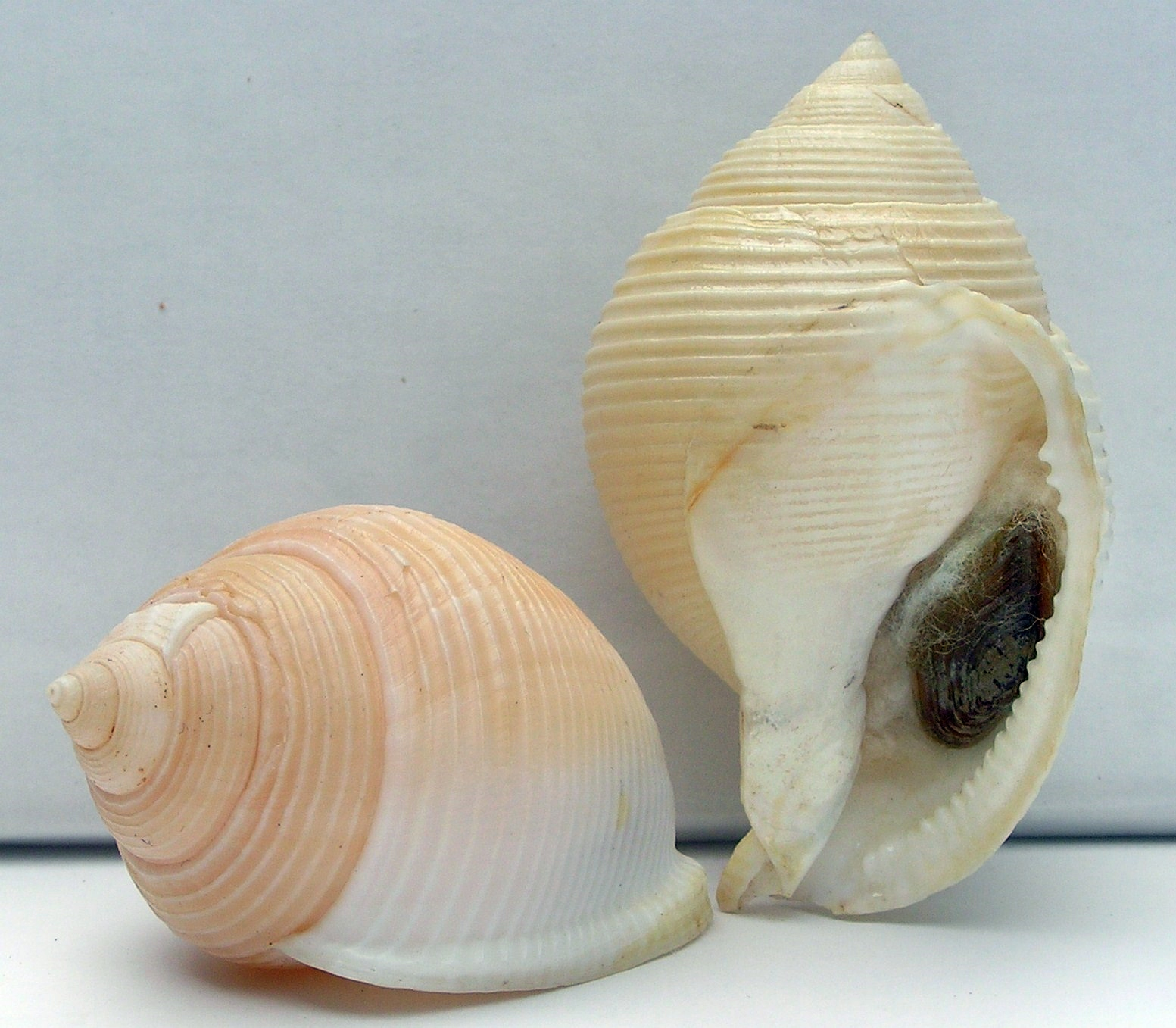
Galeodea rugosa

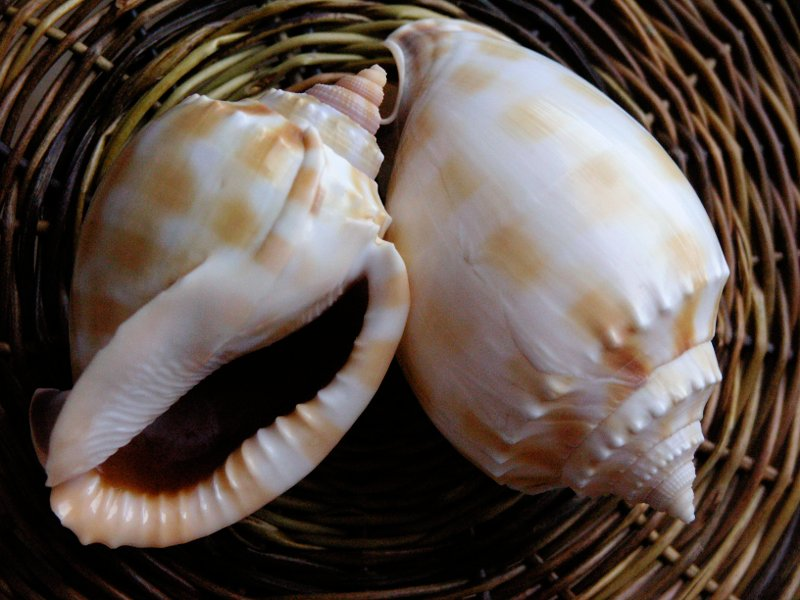
Phalium bandatum

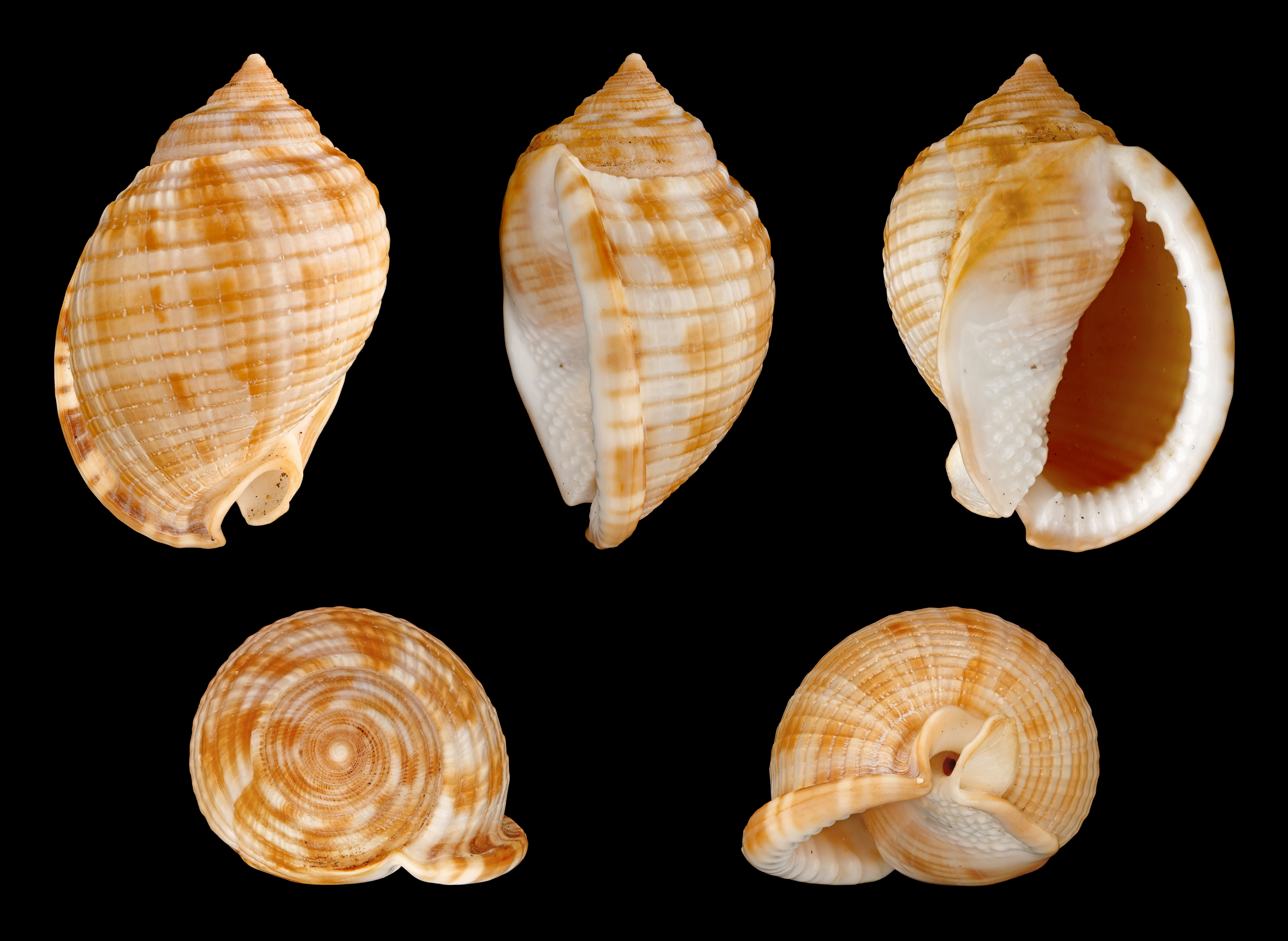
Semicassis granulata

== Human uses ==
Some helmet shells are carved into cameos, starting in Italy in 1820.

- The king helmet Cassis tuberosa was the first species to be made into cameos.
- The black helmet Cassis madagascariensis, also known as Cassis cameo, has a dark brown or a claret-coloured shell layer under a yellowish outer layer. This gives it an onyx appearance and makes it one of the most useful shells for cameos.
- The red helmet Cypraecassis rufa gives a sardonyx-like appearance because it has sard-coloured bands under its pale outer coating.
- The horned helmet Cassis cornuta produces a white figure on an orange background. It is also used as a trumpet by native Filipinos.
