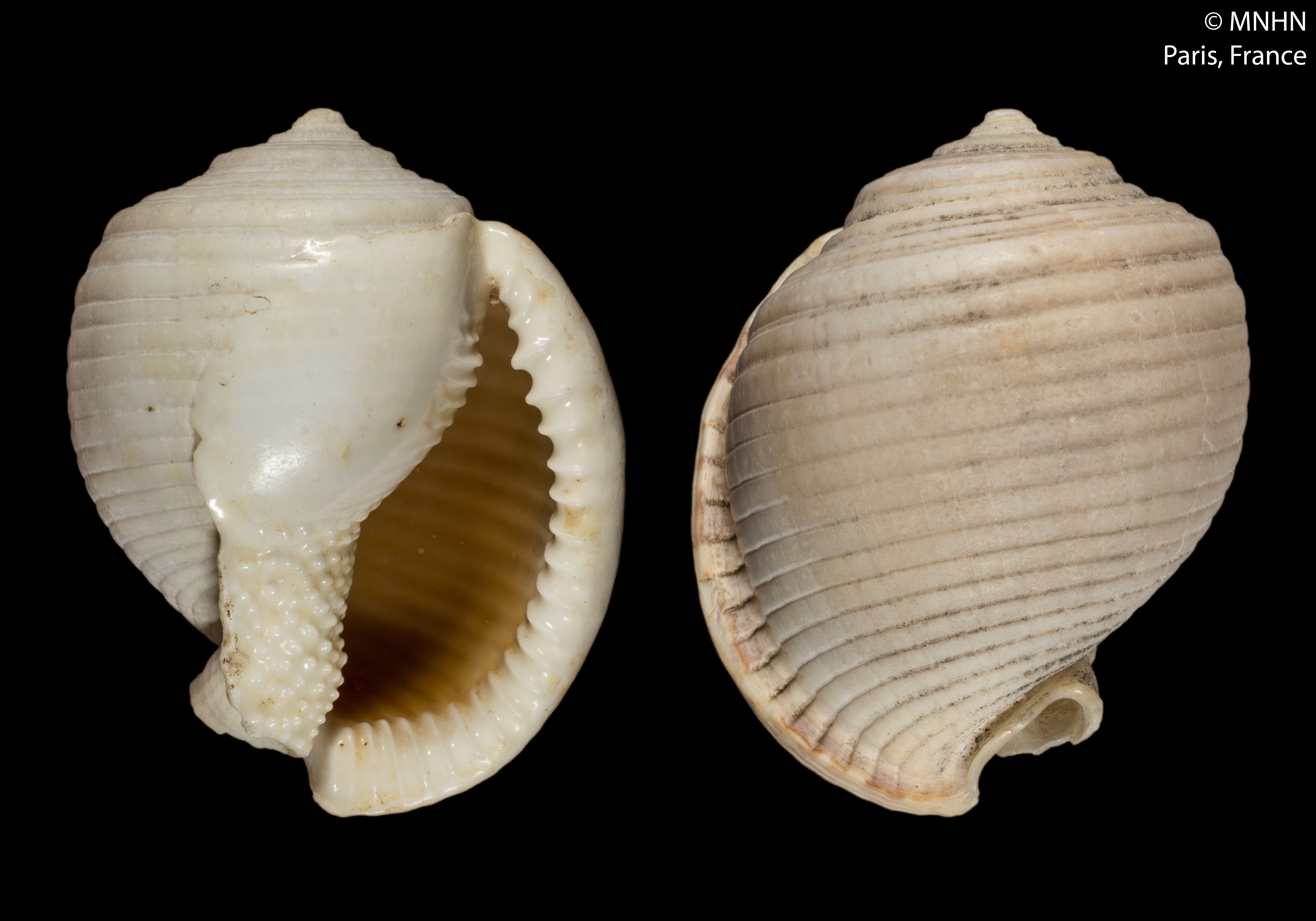

Scientific classification
- Kingdom: Animalia
- Phylum: Mollusca
- Class: Gastropoda
- Subclass: Caenogastropoda
- Order: Littorinimorpha
- Superfamily: Tonnoidea
- Family: Cassidae
- Genus: Semicassis
- Species: S. centiquadrata

Binomial name
- Semicassis centiquadrata (Valenciennes, 1832)

Synonyms
- Cassis centiquadrata Valenciennes, 1832 superseded combination; Cassis corrugata Swainson, 1822 junior subjective synonym; Cassis doliata Valenciennes, 1832 junior subjective synonym; Cassis lactea Kiener, 1835 junior subjective synonym; Phalium centiquadratum (Valenciennes, 1832) superseded combination; Semicassis (Semicassis) centiquadrata (Valenciennes, 1832) · alternate representatio

= Semicassis centiquadrata =

Species of mollusc

Semicassis centiquadrata is a species of sea snail in the family Cassidae.

== Description ==
The length of the shell varies between 33 mm and 83 mm.

== Distribution ==
This marine species occurs in the Sea of Cortez, W Mexico to Peru; also off the Galápagos.
