= Kathleen Yerger Johnstone =

American writer (1906–1996)

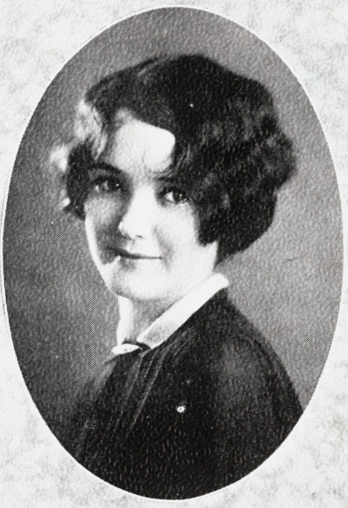
- Kathleen Yerger Johnstone, from the 1927 yearbook of the Mississippi State College for Women
- Born: August 19, 1906; Mobile, Alabama
- Died: June 19, 1996 (aged 89)
- Occupation(s): Writer, dance educator, conchologist

Kathleen Yerger Johnstone (August 19, 1906 – June 19, 1996) was an American nature writer, dance educator, and "Alabama's most famous conchologist". Alabama's state seashell, Johnstone's junonia, is named in her honor.

== Early life and education ==
Kathleen Yerger was born in Mobile, Alabama, the daughter of Arthur Warren Yerger and Kathleen Hughes Williamson Yerger. Her father, a traveling salesman, died in 1912. She graduated from the Mississippi State College for Women in 1927, and pursued further education at Columbia University. She trained as a dancer with the Art Students League of New York and the Denishawn School.

== Career ==
Yerger taught dance classes at the Lausanne School in Tennessee and at Arlington Hall in Virginia, as a young woman. She was an enthusiastic birder and seashell collector, and wrote two books about seashells later in life. "This is the kind of book that makes the hobbyist's mouth water," noted one 1957 review of her first book, Sea Treasure, "and reawakens the urge to be off to the coast and digging, dredging, or just wading."

The official state seashell of Alabama, the Scaphella junonia jounstoneae, was named for Johnstone by William J. Clench, in recognition of her work on improving public awareness and knowledge about seashells. (Another gastropod, Melongena corona johnstonei, is named for her husband.)

Johnstone was president of the Junior League of Mobile, and promoted the city's public art and architectural features. She wrote an essay for the Junior League's national magazine in 1945, proposing increased wages, shorter hours, and other improved conditions for domestic workers after World War II.

== Publications ==
- "Iron as Ornament" (1944)
- "Will Your Maid's Room Remain Maidless?" (1945)
- Sea Treasure: A Guide to Seashell Collecting (1957)
- "An Albino Robin near Mobile" (1965)
- Collecting Seashells (1970)

== Personal life ==
Yerger married architect Henry (Harry) Inge Johnstone in 1930. They had three sons. Their son Yerger Johnstone became a vice president at Morgan Stanley. Their son Douglas Inge Johnstone became a justice on the Alabama State Supreme Court. Her husband died in 1991, and she died in 1996, at age 89.
