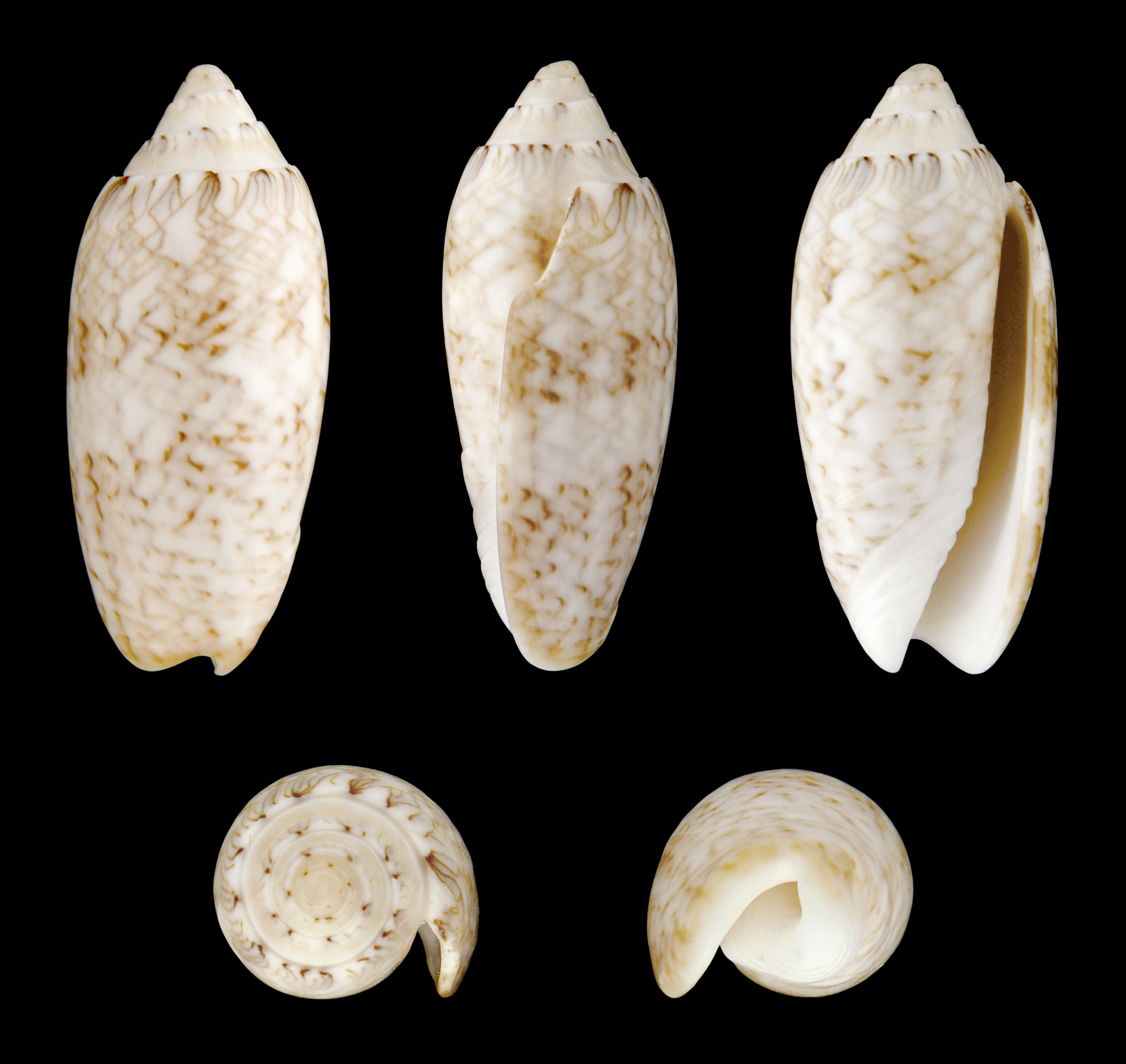

Scientific classification
- Kingdom: Animalia
- Phylum: Mollusca
- Class: Gastropoda
- Subclass: Caenogastropoda
- Order: Neogastropoda
- Family: Olividae
- Genus: Oliva
- Species: O. sayana

Binomial name
- Oliva sayana Ravenel, 1834

Synonyms
- Oliva citrina C. W. Johnson, 1911; Oliva contoyensis Petuch, 1988; Oliva litterata Lamarck, 1811; Oliva maya Petuch & Sargent, 1986; Oliva sayana Ravenel, 1834; Strephona litterata (Lamarck, 1811)

= Lettered olive =

Species of gastropod

The lettered olive, Oliva sayana, is a species of large predatory sea snail, a marine gastropod mollusc in the family Olividae, the olive shells, olive snails, or olives.

== Subspecies ==
As of April 2010, the lettered olive contains the following accepted subspecies:

- Oliva sayana sarasotensis Petuch & Sargent, 1986
- Oliva sayana sayana Ravenel, 1834
- Oliva sayana texana Petuch & Sargent, 1986

== Distribution ==
The species' range is from South Carolina to North Carolina to Florida, the Gulf states of North America, including Louisiana and Texas; and further south to the east coast of Mexico, including Campeche State, Yucatán State and Quintana Roo. It may also occur in Brazil.

== Habitat ==
The lettered olive typically lives in near-shore waters, on shallow sand flats near inlets. The empty shell is occasionally, or sometimes commonly, washed up onto ocean beaches.

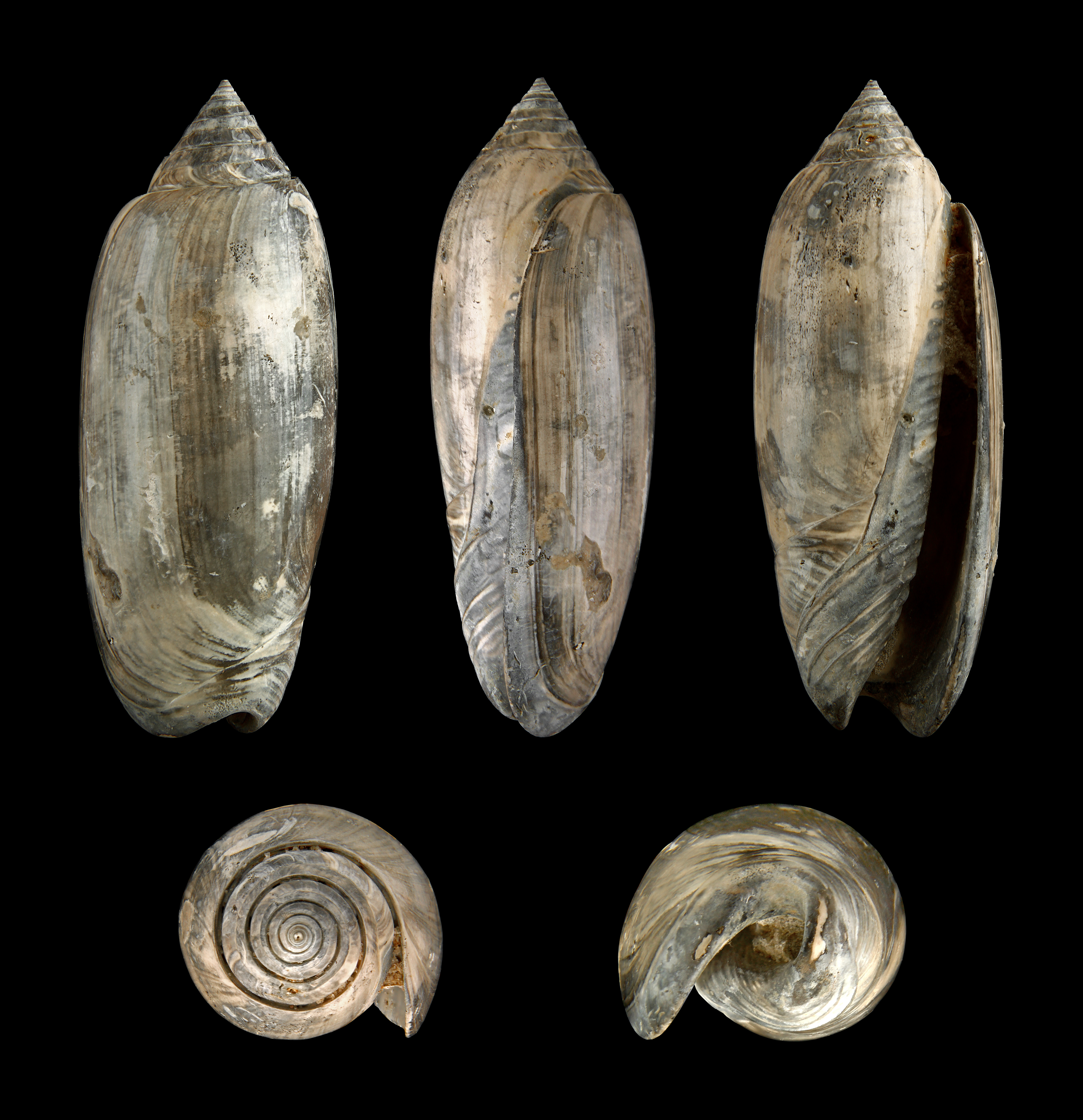
Fossil specimen from the Pliocene

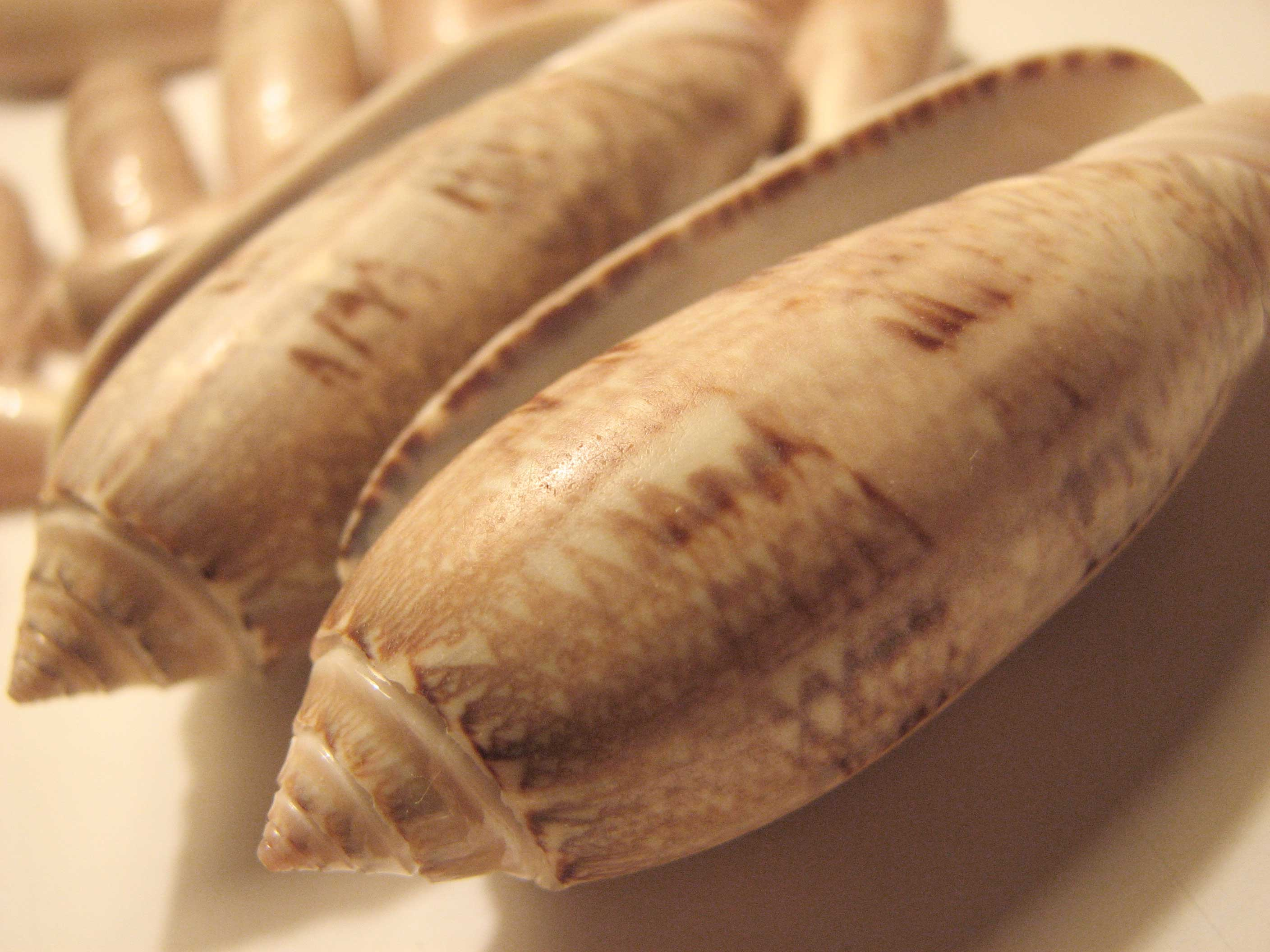
Shells

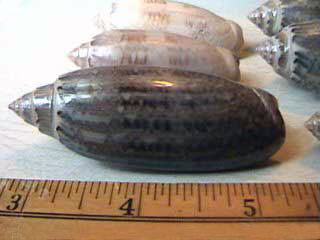
Shells

== Shell description ==
The shell of this species can be about 6 cm (2 1/4 in) long (maximum reported size reaches 9.1 cm). It is a smooth, shiny, cylindrical-shaped shell with a short spire. The aperture is narrow and extending almost the length of shell, continuing around the bottom and ending in a notch on the other side. The suture is V-cut and deep. The lower part of the whorl is just above where the suture extends outward and then at a sharp shoulder drops into the suture.

The shell coloration can vary from cream to a greyish exterior with reddish-brown zigzag markings. The common name of this species is derived from the darker surface markings that sometimes resemble letters.

== Life habits ==
Like all olives, the lettered olive is a carnivore: it captures bivalves and small crustaceans with its foot and takes them below the sand surface to digest.

Its presence is sometimes detected at very low tides by the trails it leaves when it crawls below the surface on semi-exposed sand flats.

Females lay floating, round egg capsules that are often found in beach drift. Young are free swimming.

== Human use ==
Colonists and early Native Americans made jewelry from these shells.

The lettered olive is the state shell of South Carolina.
