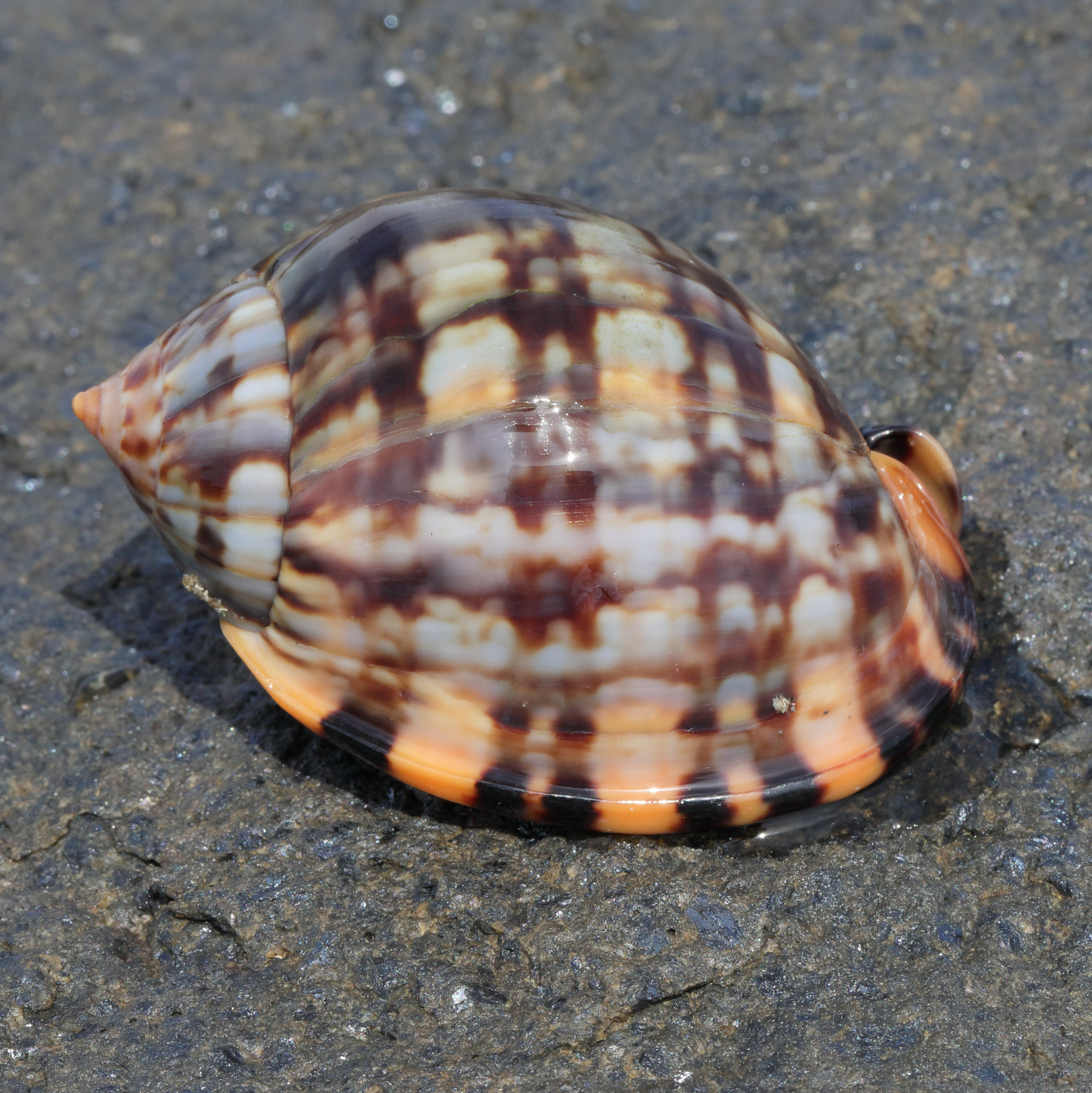
- Semicassis labiata (Lamarck, 1822)
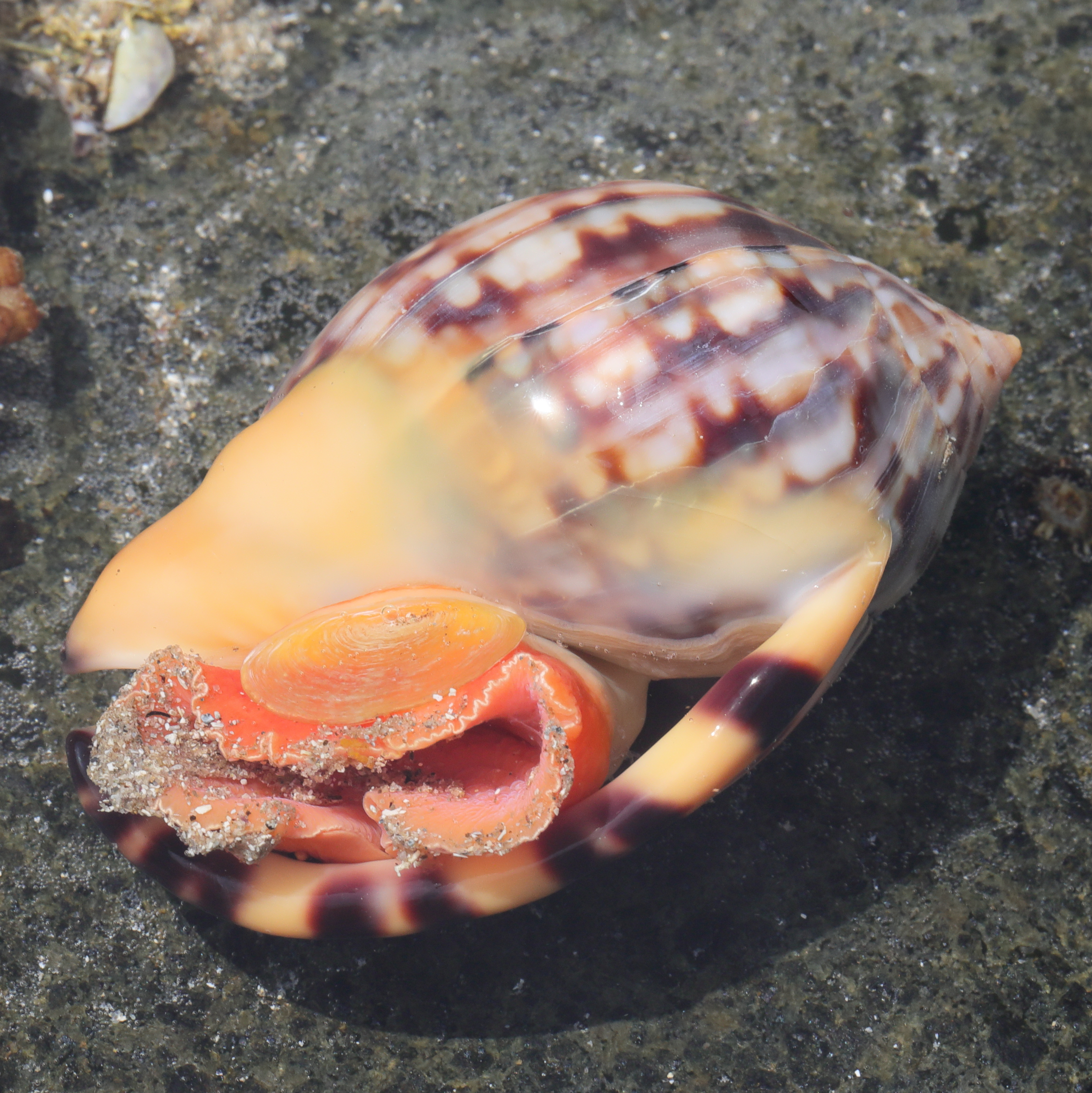
- Underside of living specimen

Scientific classification
- Kingdom: Animalia
- Phylum: Mollusca
- Class: Gastropoda
- Subclass: Caenogastropoda
- Order: Littorinimorpha
- Family: Cassidae
- Genus: Semicassis
- Species: S. labiata

Binomial name
- Semicassis labiata (Perry, 1811)

Synonyms
- Cassidea labiata Perry, 1811; Cassis achatina Lamarck, 1816; Phalium (Xenogalea) labiatum (Perry, 1811); Phalium labiatum (Perry, 1811); Semicassis (Semicassis) labiata (Perry, 1811)· accepted, alternate representation; Semicassis labiata iheringi (Carcelles, 1953); Semicassis labiata labiata (G. Perry, 1811)· accepted, alternate representation; Xenogalea collactea Finlay, 1928; Xenogalea insperata Iredale, 1927

= Semicassis labiata =

Species of gastropod

Semicassis labiata, common name the helmet bonnet shell, is a species of large predatory sea snail, a marine gastropod mollusc. This species is in the subfamily Cassinae, the "helmet shells" and "bonnet shells", which feed on sea urchins.

== Subspecies ==
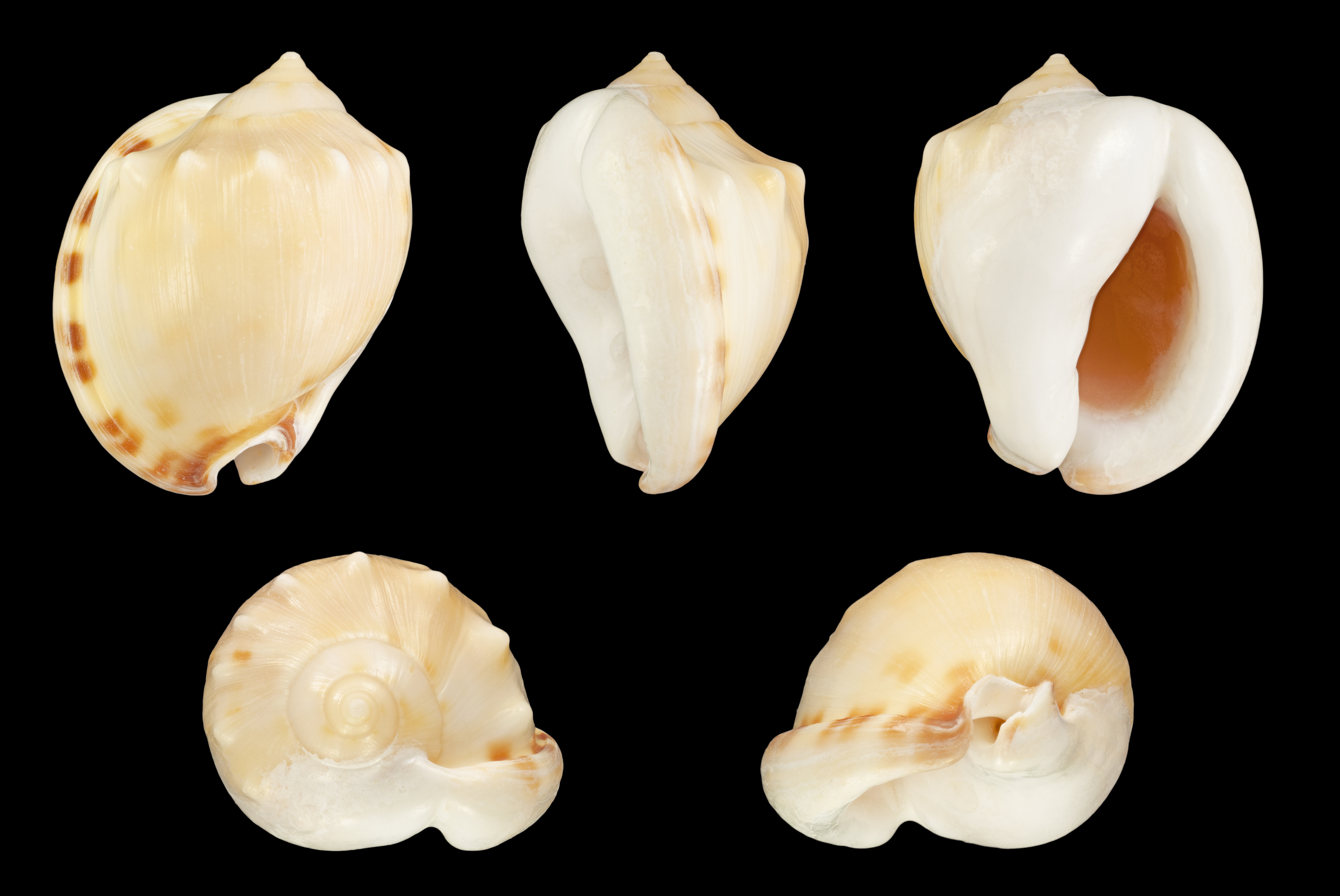
Semicassis labiata zeylanica (Lamarck, 1822) shell

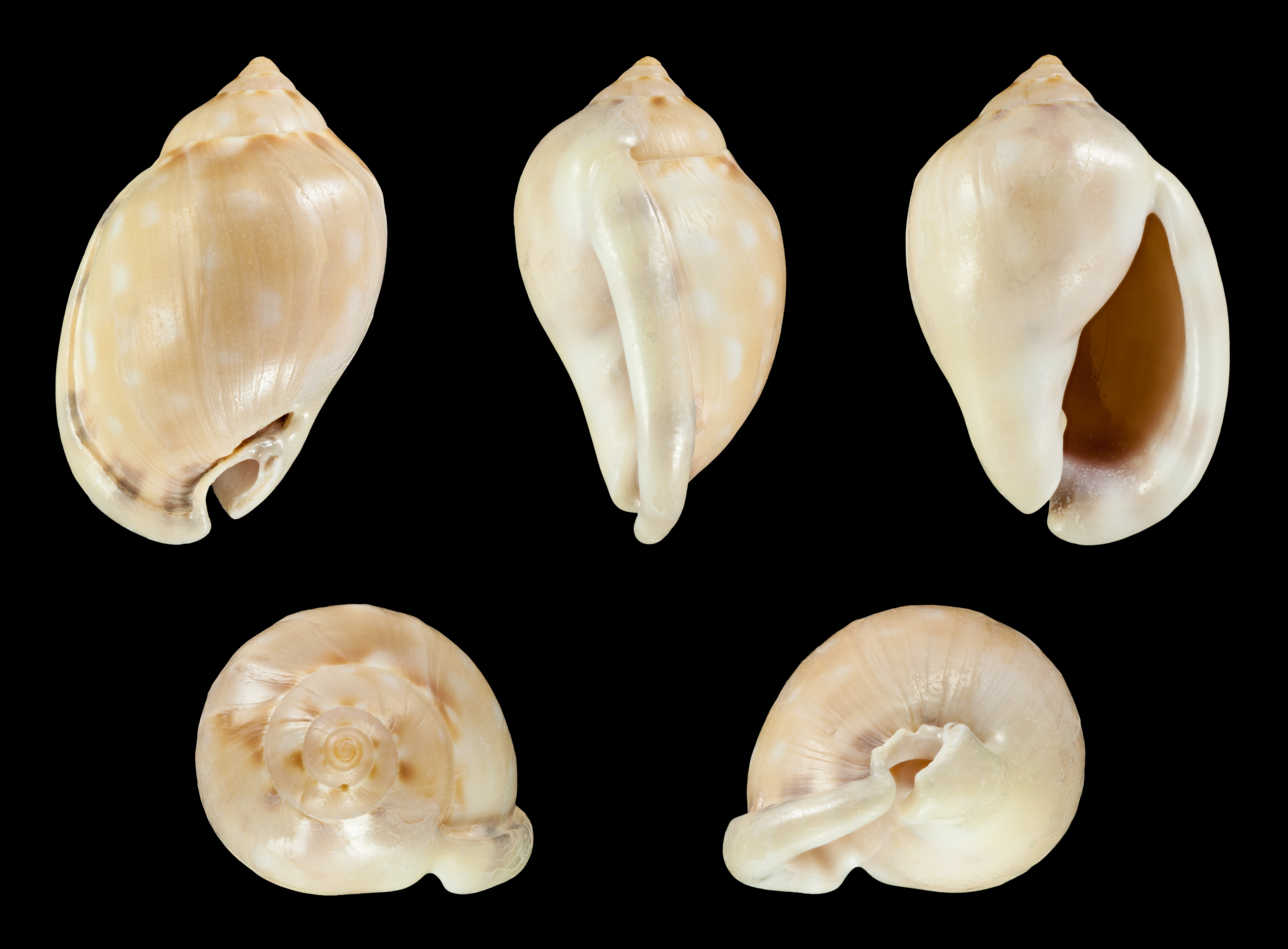
Semicassis labiata iredalei (Bayer, 1935) shell

- Semicassis labiata iheringi (Carcelles, 1953)
- Semicassis labiata labiata (G. Perry, 1811)
- Semicassis labiata zeylanica (Lamarck, 1822)

== Distribution ==
This species occurs in New Zealand. Along South Africa, it occurs off the West coast False Bay to KwaZulu-Natal north coast at subtidal depths up to 150 m.

== Description ==
The maximum recorded shell length of Semicassis labiata iheringi is 76 mm. Also trawled at 70–75 m. depth, off São Paulo, Brazil.

The shell is rounded with a low but somewhat pointed spire. It is glossy and smooth, though often displaying one to two rows of low nodules in the shoulder region. In adult specimens, the outer lip is thickened, and the anterior end features a pronounced, up-curving siphonal notch. The shell shows significant variation in size, nodule prominence, thickness, and depth of coloration. Specimens from the Agulhas Bank tend to be larger, thinner, with weaker nodules and less vivid coloration. Here's an improved version of your description:

The color of the shell ranges from pale pinkish-brown to yellowish-brown, with some specimens featuring three to five rows of diffuse, semicircular whitish spots. The outer lip is marked by deep purple blotches, often appearing in pairs. Shell colors tend to fade significantly after death.

== Habitat ==
The minimum recorded depth of Semicassis labiata iheringi is 25 m, and the maximum recorded depth is 84 m.
