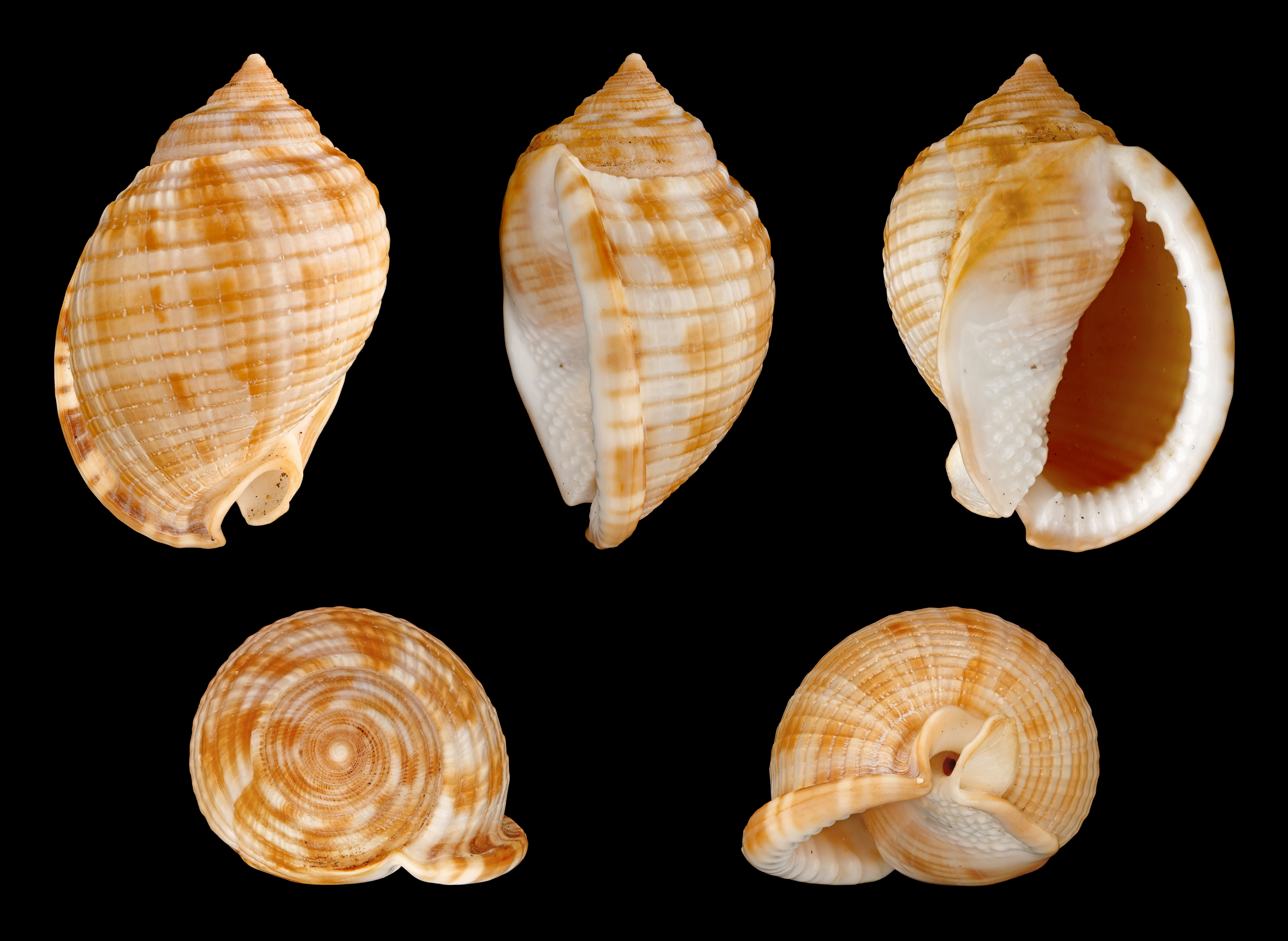
- Five views of a shell of Semicassis granulata

Scientific classification
- Kingdom: Animalia
- Phylum: Mollusca
- Class: Gastropoda
- Subclass: Caenogastropoda
- Order: Littorinimorpha
- Family: Cassidae
- Genus: Semicassis
- Species: S. granulata

Binomial name
- Semicassis granulata (Born, 1778)

Synonyms
- List of synonyms: Buccinum cicatricosum Gmelin, 1791; Buccinum gibbum (Gmelin, 1791); Buccinum globosum Gmelin, 1791; Buccinum granulatum Born, 1778 (original combination); Buccinum inflatum (Shaw, 1811); Buccinum recurvirostrum Gmelin, 1791; Buccinum undulatum Gmelin, 1791; Cassidea granulosa (Bruguière, 1792); Cassidea sulcosus Bruguière, 1792; Cassis abbreviata (Lamarck, 1822); Cassis calamistrata Locard, 1892; Cassis cepa (Röding, 1798); Cassis globulus (Röding, 1798); Cassis gmelini Locard, 1886; Cassis inflata (Shaw, 1811); Cassis lacteus Kiener, 1835; Cassis laevigata (Menke, 1828); Cassis malum (Röding, 1798); Cassis minuta (Menke, 1829); Cassis monilifera (Guppy, 1866); Cassis plicata (Scopoli, 1786); Cassis reclusa (Guppy, 1873); Cassis sulcosus var. elongata Weinkauff, 1868; Cassis sulcosus var. varicosa Weinkauff, 1868; Cassis tessellata (Pfeiffer, 1840); Cassis undulatus (Gmelin, 1791); Cassis undulatus var. ebla de Gregorio, 1886; Cassis undulatus var. minima Pallary, 1900; Cassis undulatus var. ghirma de Gregorio, 1886; Cassis undulatus var. syriaca Pallary, 1938; Phalium cicatricosum (Gmelin, 1791); Phalium granulatum (Von Born, 1778); Phalium granulatum granulatum (Von Born, 1778); † Phalium granulatum loxahatcheense Petuch, 1994; Phalium inflata (Shaw, 1811); † Phalium loxahatcheense (Petuch, 1994); Semicassis cicatricosa (Gmelin, 1791); Semicassis cicatricosa peristephes Pilsbry & McGinty, 1939; Semicassis (Semicassis) granulata (Born, 1778)· accepted, alternate representation; Semicassis (Semicassis) granulata granulata (Born, 1778)· accepted, alternate representation; Semicassis granulata undulata (Gmelin, 1791); Semicassis undulata var. levilabiata Paetel, 1888; Semicassis ventricosa (Mörch, 1852); Xenogalea lucrativa Iredale, 1927

= Scotch bonnet (sea snail) =

Species of mollusc

The Scotch bonnet (Semicassis granulata) is a medium-sized to large species of sea snail, a marine gastropod mollusk in the subfamily Cassinae, the helmet shells and bonnet shells. The common name "Scotch bonnet" alludes to the general outline and color pattern of the shell, which vaguely resemble a tam o' shanter, a traditional Scottish bonnet or cap. The shell is egg-shaped and fairly large, 2 to 4 inches (5 to 10 cm) in maximum dimension, with a regular pattern of yellow, orange or brown squarish spots. The surface sculpture of the shell is highly variable: the surface can be smooth and polished, have grooves, be granulated, or even be nodulose on the shoulder of the whorls.

This species lives intertidally and subtidally on sandy substrates, and is found primarily in the tropical and subtropical Western Atlantic Ocean, from North Carolina to Uruguay. It is the most common species in this subfamily in North America. A similar-appearing sea snail in the Mediterranean Sea and Northern Atlantic Ocean, Semicassis undulata, is currently considered to be a separate species. The exact taxonomy of Semicassis granulata has been unclear in the past: as well as the current combination, 38 other combinations and synonyms exist.

In the spring, the adult females of this species lay eggs in tower-shaped structures. The eggs hatch as veliger larvae, which can float in the plankton for up to 14 weeks before settling onto the seabed as tiny snails. Crabs are a predator of this sea snail. After the death of the snails, if the shells are still intact they are often used by hermit crabs.

In 1965, in the US, the Scotch bonnet shell was named as a state symbol of North Carolina, the first designation of a US state shell.

== Etymology ==
Scientific name

The generic name is a combination of the Latin prefix semi, meaning half, and noun cassis, meaning helmet. The specific name of this taxon, granulata, is derived from the Latin noun grana meaning grain. Here it is used in the diminutive form, meaning granulated, or covered in granules, i.e. small grains or pellets, referring to the shell sculpture.

Common name

The shell of this species was given the common name "Scotch bonnet" because of a vague resemblance to a tam o' shanter, a traditional tartan hat which used to be commonly worn in Scotland. The shell has a regular pattern of square or rectangular patches that are orange, tan, or brown in color. The shell can sometimes be smooth except for growth lines, but in other individuals it can have a sculpture of incised spiral grooves and even weak axial ribs which, together with the colored patches on the shell, create an effect that is reminiscent of the pattern of a Scottish plaid.

== Taxonomy ==
This species was originally named Buccinum granulatum, and was described by the Austrian naturalist Ignaz von Born in 1778. Born's description is in Latin and reads:

"Testa ovata, transversim, obsolete sulcata, tessulis luteis seriatim maculata, labio granulato, cauda recurva".

Translated, this reads:

"Shell ovate, transversely obscurely sulcate [or grooved], regularly marked with yellow squares, the lip granulated, the tail recurved"

Since 1778, this taxon has been recombined numerous times into different genera and subgenera. Nearly a century after Born's description, in 1877, the Swedish naturalist Otto Andreas Lowson Mörch proposed a new combination and transferred this taxon to the genus Cassis and subgenus Semicassis. In 1944, the American malacologist William James Clench recombined the species as Phalium (Semicassis) granulatum, and five years later the Brazilian naturalist Frederico Lange de Morretes recombined it as Semicassis granulatum. American malacologist Clifton S. Weaver reallocated it in the subgenus Tylocassis in 1962, though American malacologist R. Tucker Abbott recombined it as Phalium (Tylocassis) granulatum six years later. American malacologist Andrew C. Miller recombined it as Phalium granulatum in 1983, and German malacologist Kurt Kreipl recombined it as Semicassis (Semicassis) granulata in 1997. The currently accepted combination, Semicassis granulata, was proposed by New Zealand paleontologist Alan Beu, based on paleontological data.

=== Subspecies ===
There is a similar-looking species, Semicassis undulata, which lives in the Mediterranean Sea and the Macaronesian Islands, parts of the northeastern Atlantic. In 1791, that sea snail was given the specific name undulata by the German naturalist Johann Friedrich Gmelin. In 2015, this taxon was considered to be a subspecies of S. granulata, and therefore was known as Semicassis granulata undulata. Semicassis undulata has mistakenly been reported from the Western Atlantic Ocean, but does not occur there.

=== Forms ===
Some Scotch bonnets have a completely smooth and glossy shell. These were thought to be a different species, which was given the name cicatricosa by Gmelin in 1791. This taxon was recognized for a while, including up until 2010, as a separate species, Semicassis cicatricosa. However, in 2015 this is considered to be only a form, therefore S. cicatricosa has become another synonym of S. granulata. For this smooth and glossy form, the maximum recorded shell length is 60 mm. The minimum recorded depth for this form is 0 m; the maximum recorded depth is 6 m.

In 1939, the shell form of Semicassis granulata which has nodules on the shoulder was named as a subspecies, Semicassis cicatricosa peristephes, by American malacologists Henry G. Pilsbry and Thomas L. Mcginty. This supposed subspecies has since been considered a synonym of S. cicatricosa, and consequently of S. granulata.

== Distribution ==
There are published records of the nominate subspecies Semicassis granulata granulata from several warm-water and tropical areas of the Western Atlantic Ocean. It is considered the most common species of Cassinae in North America. Regions and countries where this species occurs include the East Coast of the US, in North Carolina, South Carolina, Georgia and Florida (East Florida, West Florida, and the Florida Keys). It has also been recorded on the Gulf Coast of the US, including Louisiana and Texas. The species is known to occur in the Caribbean Coast of Central America, including Mexico (Quintana Roo), Nicaragua, Costa Rica, Panama and Colombia, as well as Venezuela (Gulf of Venezuela, Carabobo, Sucre, Isla Margarita and Los Testigos Islands). It is also found in Bermuda, the Greater Antilles, Cuba, Jamaica and Puerto Rico, and further south in the Atlantic coast of South America, Suriname, Brazil (Amapá, Maranhão, Ceará, Rio Grande do Norte, Pernambuco, Alagoas, Bahia, Espírito Santo, Rio de Janeiro, São Paulo, Paraná and Santa Catarina), and also in Uruguay. As of 2009, this species had apparently not been reported in the literature as occurring in the Lesser Antilles.

In contrast, the species Semicassis undulata occurs in the Mediterranean Sea, and parts of the North Atlantic Ocean, including Portugal and the Azores.

== Anatomy ==
Shell description

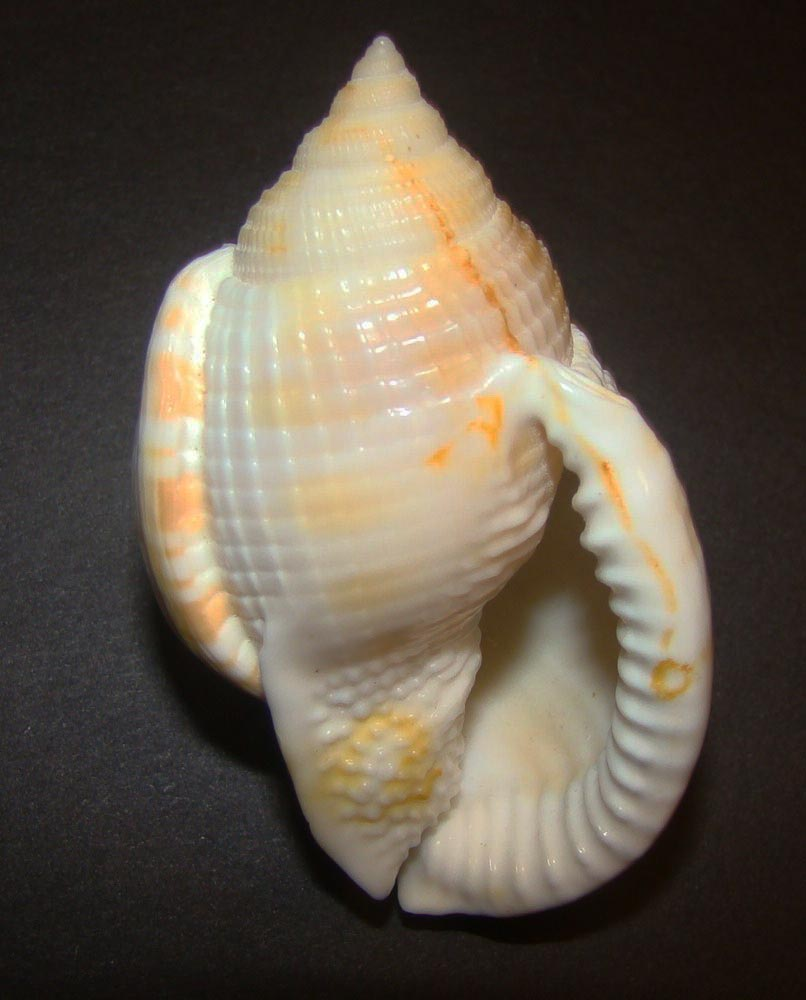
A varix is visible on the left in this ventral view of a slightly discolored shell of Semicassis granulata from North Carolina, United States.

The egg-shaped shell of this species usually grows to 40–55 mm in length (1 1/2" - 2 1/8") (the maximum recorded shell length is 121 mm (4.76 in)). It is thick and solid, with a moderately high spire and rounded body whorl, and adult specimens have approximately five whorls. The protoconch is rounded, colored cream with an orange to brown apex. The teleoconch is sculptured by spiral grooves crossed by mostly rather faint growth lines. Its surface varies in the degree of shell sculpture that is present. Some shells are completely smooth with a high gloss, whereas other shells are grooved. The surface of some shells is granulated, and some even have nodules on the shoulders of the whorls. Several times at different growth stages, the shell develops a thick outer lip, which is characteristic of the subfamily Cassinae. The snail rests between each of these stages of growth, and usually absorbs the entire outer lip before it begins to grow again. In some cases, especially in deep water, the Scotch bonnet does not absorb the outer lip completely, leaving behind a varix on the whorls of the mature shell.

The shell has a large aperture, with a thick outer lip, and a glossy, oval parietal shield. The outer lip has a series of short, strong lirae, giving it a toothed appearance. The lower part of the inner lip near the siphonal notch has many "pimple-like" bumps or pustules. It has a yellow to brown corneous operculum, with an outline that matches the aperture's contour. The shell is colored pale tan or creamy white, sometimes purplish, with regularly-arranged, orange to light brown rectangular markings that often appear faded, even in fresh specimens. Shells of adult females are larger than those of males.

== Ecology ==
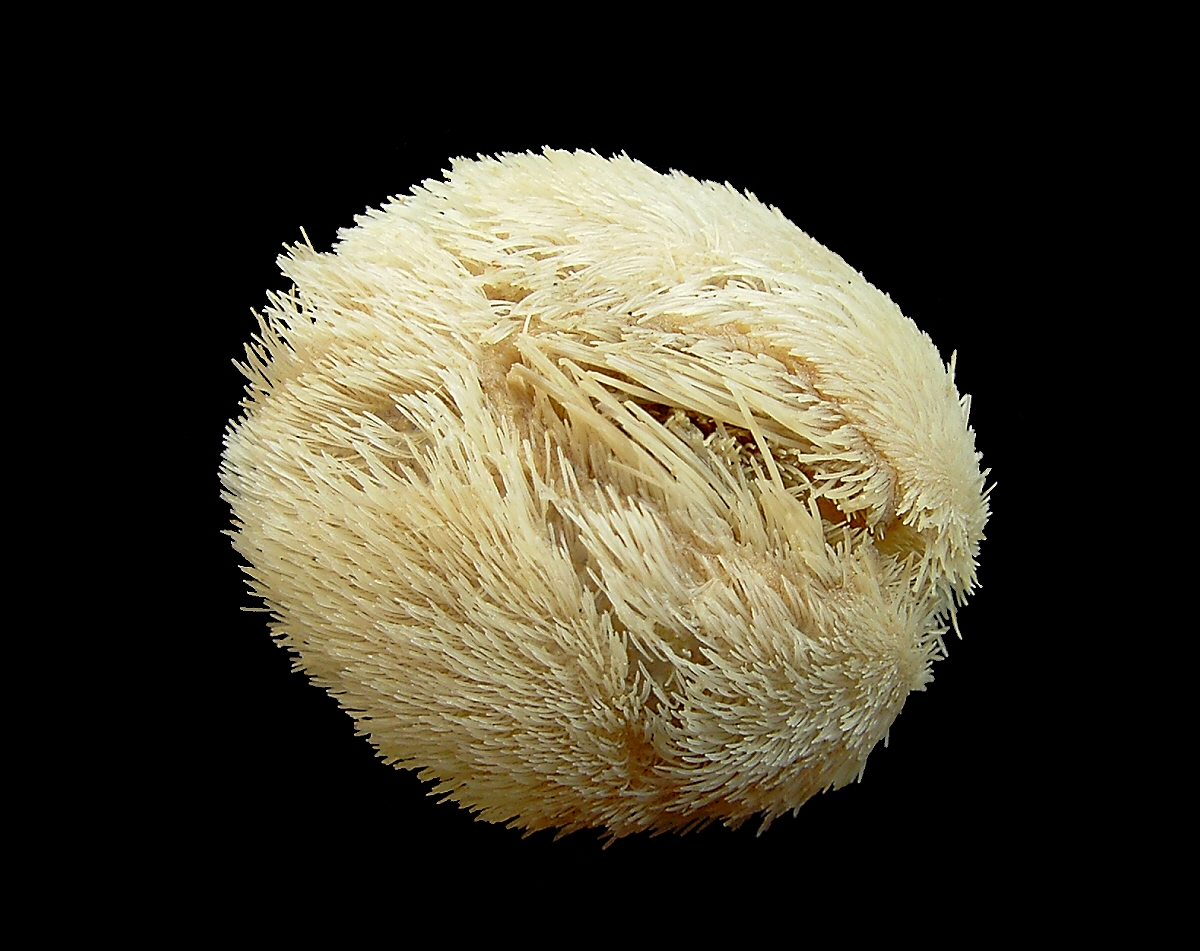
The sea potato, Echinocardium cordatum, is the favored echinoid prey of S. granulata in the Mediterranean.

Scotch bonnets are predators; they search for their food on sandy stretches of the ocean floor, where they consume echinoderms such as sand dollars, sea biscuits, and other sea urchins (such as Echinocardium cordatum), drilling into their tests with the aid of sulfuric acid.

=== Habitat ===
Semicassis granulata lives on sandy substrate in moderately shallow water, as well as rocky tide pools close to the shore. Off the coast of North Carolina, divers and local fisherman frequently find Scotch bonnets at depths of about 50 to 150 feet (15 to 46 m); however, live specimens can be found in depths from 0 to 94 metres (0 to 308 ft). Empty shells have been found in depths of up to 97 metres (318 ft). These snails are often found in association with the offshore Atlantic calico scallop beds, probably attracted by the abundant food. Shipwrecks also seem to provide a good habitat for this species.

=== Life cycle ===
During the spring, favorable food supplies, adequate light, and optimum water temperature provide conditions for breeding and early growth. At this time, the female deposits hundreds of egg capsules in tower-shaped structures about 4 to 5 inches (10 to 13 cm) high. The male fertilizes these eggs. After fertilization, the eggs develop into trochophore larvae, and the eggs subsequently hatch as free swimming microscopic veliger larvae, which can be carried some distance on ocean currents.

Growth is slow, and the veligers are carried by the ocean currents for up to 14 weeks. As the veligers mature, they develop their first shell (the smooth protoconch) and turn into very small juvenile snails, at which point they sink to the ocean floor. As is the case in all shelled mollusks, the mantle is what secretes the shell; shell growth begins at what will later become the apex of the shell, and typically rotates clockwise. As the animal gradually matures, the mantle continues to secrete shell material. Scotch bonnets complete maturation in one to six years. However, some have lived more than six years.

=== Predators ===
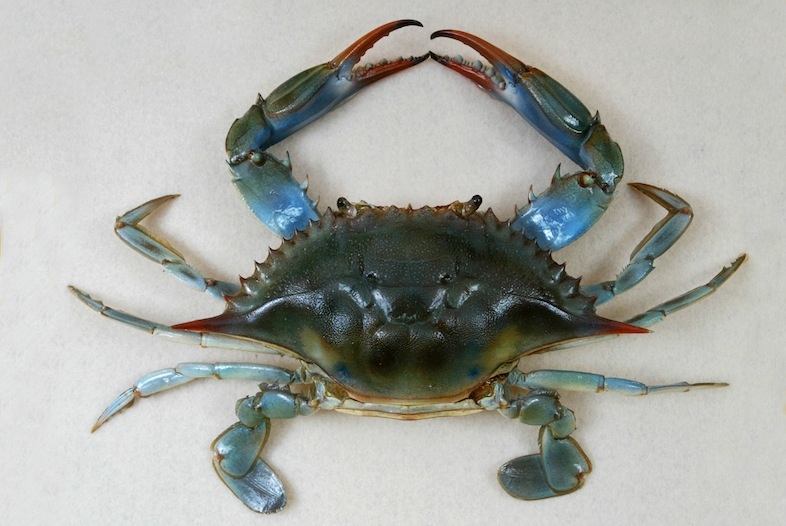
The blue crab sometimes feeds on the Scotch bonnet.

The Scotch bonnet is preyed upon by vertebrates, such as fish, and invertebrates, including crabs such as the blue crab and the Florida stone crab. Crabs can crush the snail's shell, eating the soft internal organs and muscle tissue. The snail's only defense mechanism against predation is to draw its body into the shell. By doing so, they can at least partially close the aperture using the operculum.

=== Use by other invertebrates ===
After death, the empty shell of this sea snail is often used by hermit crabs. On the coast of the Caraguatatuba, Brazil, a study of shell use in the diogenid hermit crab species Isocheles sawayai was carried out. This study revealed that 11.5% of the population of these hermit crabs were using shells of Semicassis granulata. The occupation of shell type was reported as not being random, but was instead described as being influenced by the weight, size, shape and internal volume of the shell, the occurrence of epibionts such as bryozoans on the shell, and the degree of resistance the shell offered to predation and desiccation.

== Human use ==
In 1965, the US state of North Carolina named the Scotch bonnet as its official state shell, in honor of the abundance of Scottish settlers that founded the state. With this designation, North Carolina became the first state in the US to have a state shell.

Populations of S. granulata have been suffering a decline due to increased collection and accidental harvesting by commercial fishermen.
