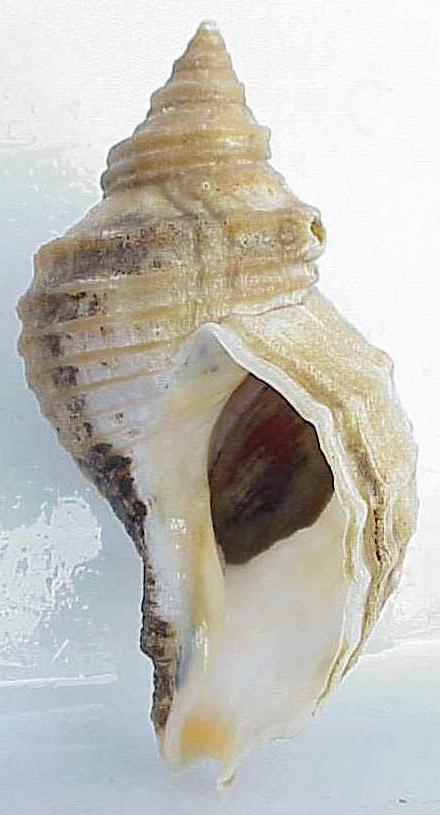
- Apertural view of a shell of Neptunea lyrata showing the operculum

Scientific classification
- Kingdom: Animalia
- Phylum: Mollusca
- Class: Gastropoda
- Subclass: Caenogastropoda
- Order: Neogastropoda
- Family: Buccinidae
- Genus: Neptunea
- Species: N. lyrata

Binomial name
- Neptunea lyrata J. F. Gmelin, 1791

Synonyms
- Murex lyratus Gmelin, 1791

= Neptunea lyrata =

Species of mollusc

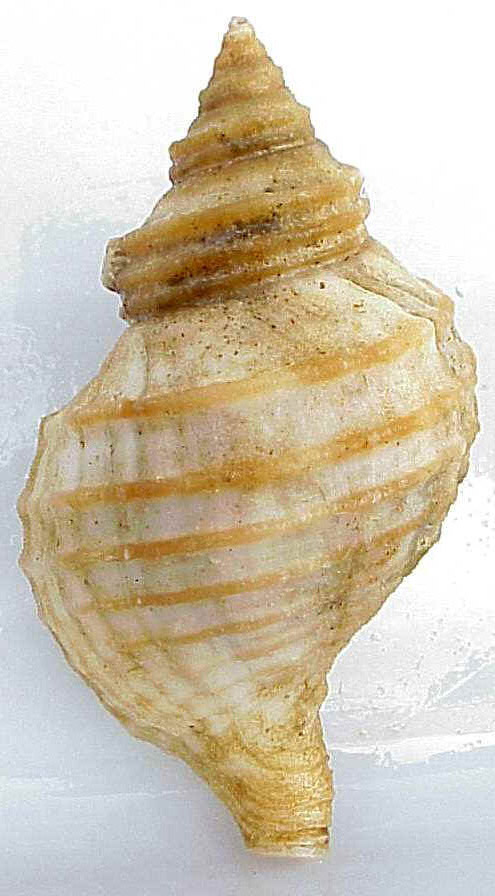
Abapertural view of the shell of Neptunea lyrata

Neptunea lyrata, also known by the common names New England Neptune, wrinkled whelk, ribbed Neptune, inflated whelk, lyre whelk or lyre Neptune, is a species of large sea snail, a marine gastropod mollusk in the family Buccinidae, and is the state shell of Massachusetts. This species consists of several subspecies.

The New England Neptune (Neptunea lyrata decemcostata) was declared the state seashell of Massachusetts in 1987.

== Subspecies ==
- Neptunea lyrata altispira
- Neptunea lyrata lyrata Gmelin, 1791 - lyre whelk
- Neptunea lyrata decemcostata (Say, 1826) – wrinkled whelk or New England Neptune – synonyms: Chrysodomus decemcostata (Say, 1826); Tritonium decemcostata (Say, 1826); Fusus decemcostatus Say, 1826; Neptunea turnerae Clarke, 1956
- Neptunea lyrata turnerae Clarke, 1956

== Distribution ==
Neptunea lyrata occurs in the Western Atlantic Ocean, and also off Alaska.
