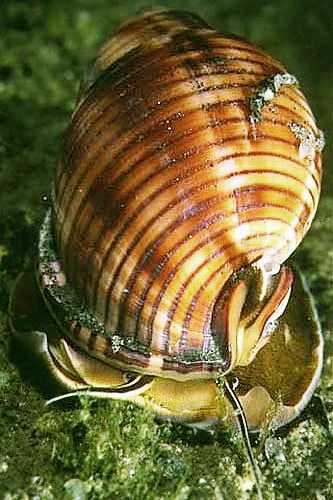
- A live individual of Semicassis undulata from Italy
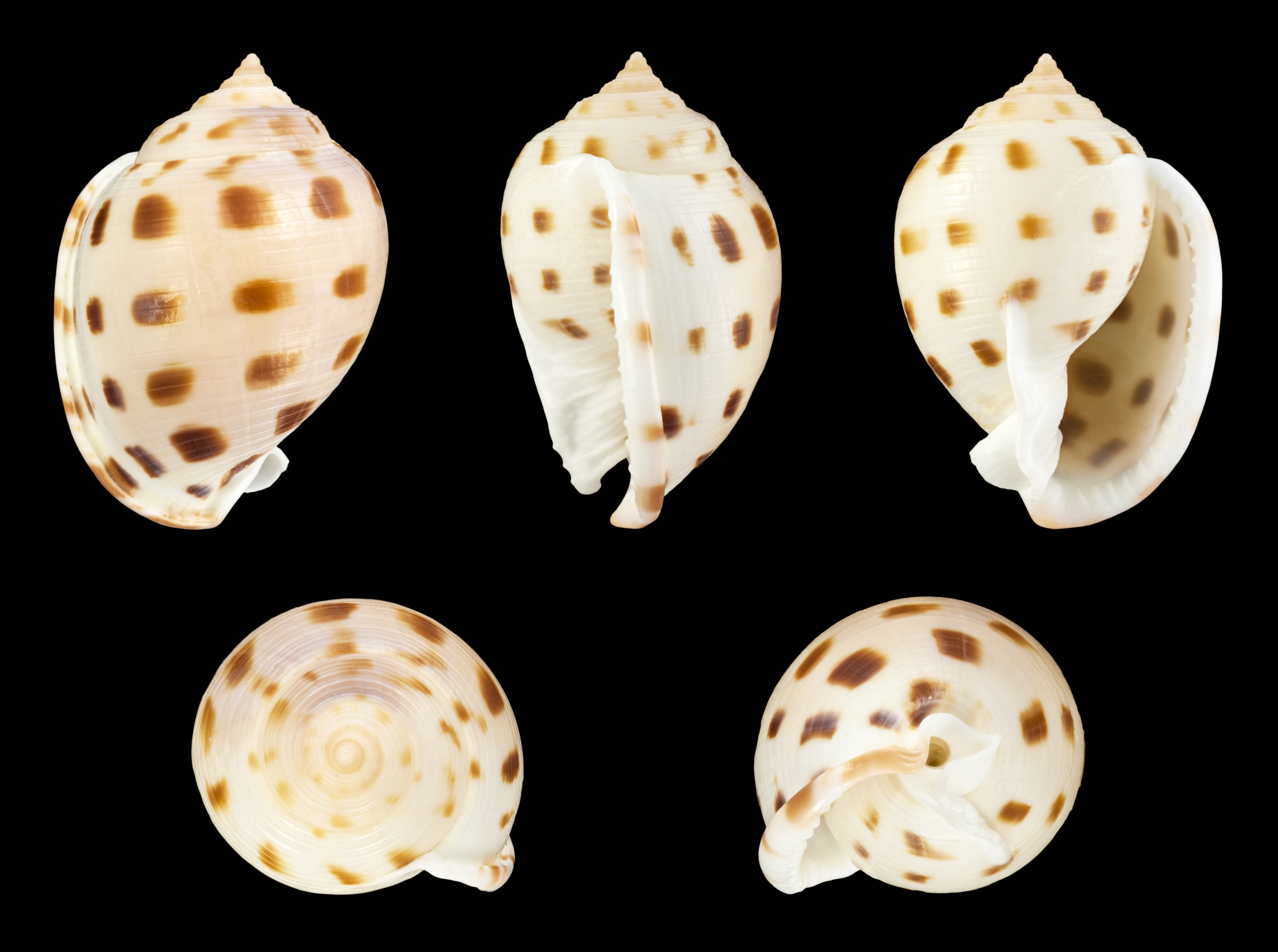
- Five views of a shell of Semicassis bisulcata from the Philippines

Scientific classification
- Kingdom: Animalia
- Phylum: Mollusca
- Class: Gastropoda
- Subclass: Caenogastropoda
- Order: Littorinimorpha
- Superfamily: Tonnoidea
- Family: Cassidae
- Genus: Semicassis; Mörch, 1852

Type species
- Cassis japonica Reeve, 1848

Synonyms
- Antephalium Iredale, 1927; Cassidea (Semicassis) Mörch, 1852; Cassis (Semicassis) Mörch, 1852 (original rank); Faurotis Jousseaume, 1888; Maucassis C. A. Fleming, 1943 †; Phalium (Kahua) Marwick, 1928 †; Phalium (Semicassis) Mörch, 1852; Phalium (Xenogalea) Iredale, 1927; Semicassis (Antephalium) Iredale, 1927· accepted, alternate representation; Semicassis (Kahua) Marwick, 1928 †· accepted, alternate representation; Semicassis (Semicassis) Mörch, 1852· accepted, alternate representation; Semicassis (Xenophalium) Iredale, 1927; Tylocassis Woodring, 1928; Xenogalea Iredale, 1927; Xenophalium Iredale, 1927; Xenophalium (Mauicassis) C. A. Fleming, 1943; Xenophalium (Xenogalea) Iredale, 1927

= Semicassis =

Semicassis Temporal range: Eocene - Recent

Genus of gastropods

Semicassis is a genus of medium-sized predatory sea snails, marine gastropod molluscs in the subfamily Cassinae within the family Cassidae, the helmet snails and bonnet snails.

== Species ==
According to the World Register of Marine Species (WoRMS), the following species with valid names are included within the genus Semicassis:

- Semicassis adcocki (Sowerby III, 1896)
- Semicassis angasi (Iredale, 1927)
- Semicassis bisulcata (Schubert & Wagner, 1829)
- Semicassis bondarevi Mühlhäusser & Parth, 1993
- Semicassis bulla Habe, 1961
- Semicassis canaliculata (Bruguière, 1792)
- Semicassis cancellata (Lamarck, 1803)
- Semicassis centiquadrata (Valenciennes, 1832)
- Semicassis craticulata (Euthyme, 1885)
- Semicassis decipiens (Kilburn, 1980)
- Semicassis dorae (Kreipl & Mühlhäusser, 1996)
- Semicassis dougthorni Dekkers, 2013
- Semicassis faurotis (Jousseaume, 1888)
- Semicassis fernandesi (Kilburn, 1975)
- † Semicassis fibrata (P. Marshall & Murdoch, 1920)
- Semicassis glabrata (Dunker, 1852)
- Semicassis granulata (Born, 1778) - synonym: Phalium granulatum (Born, 1778)
- † Semicassis grateloupi (Deshayes, 1853)
- Semicassis inornata (Pilsbry, 1895)
- † Semicassis kaawaensis (Bartrum & Powell, 1928)
- Semicassis labiata (Perry, 1811)
- † Semicassis laevigata (Defrance, 1817)
- †Semicassis lilliei (C. A. Fleming, 1943)
- † Semicassis marwicki (C. A. Fleming, 1943)
- Semicassis microstoma (Martens, 1903)
- † Semicassis neumayri (Hoernes, 1875)
- Semicassis paucirugis (Menke, 1843)
- Semicassis pyrum (Lamarck, 1822)
- Semicassis royana (Iredale, 1914)
- Semicassis saburon (Bruguière, 1792)
- Semicassis semigranosa (Lamarck, 1822)
- Semicassis sinuosa (Verco, 1904)
- † Semicassis skinneri (Marwick, 1928)
- Semicassis sophia (Brazier, 1872)
- † Semicassis subsulcosa (Hoernes & Auinger, 1884)
- † Semicassis szilviae Kovács & Vicián, 2018
- Semicassis thachi Kreipl, Alf & Eggeling, 2006
- Semicassis thomsoni (Brazier, 1875)
- Semicassis umbilicata (Pease, 1861)
- Semicassis undulata (Gmelin, 1791)
- Semicassis westralis Kreipl, 1997
- Semicassis whitworthi (Abbott, 1968)
- Semicassis zeylanica (Lamarck, 1822)

Species brought into synonymy

- Semicassis cicatricosa (Gmelin, 1791): synonym of Semicassis granulata (Born, 1778)
- Semicassis diuturna Iredale, 1927: synonym of Semicassis bisulcata (Schubert & J. A. Wagner, 1829)
- Semicassis japonica (Reeve, 1848): synonym of Semicassis bisulcata (Schubert & J. A. Wagner, 1829)
- Semicassis miolaevigata Sacco, 1890: synonym of Semicassis saburon (Bruguière, 1792)
- Semicassis obscura Habe, 1961: synonym of Semicassis bulla Habe, 1961
- Semicassis pauciruge: synonym of Semicassis paucirugis (Menke, 1843)
- Semicassis persimilis Kira, 1955: synonym of Semicassis bisulcata (Schubert & J. A. Wagner, 1829)
- Semicassis pila (Reeve, 1848): synonym of Semicassis bisulcata (Schubert & J. A. Wagner, 1829)
- Semicassis salmonea Beu, Bouchet & Tröndlé, 2012: synonym of Semicassis bulla Habe, 1961

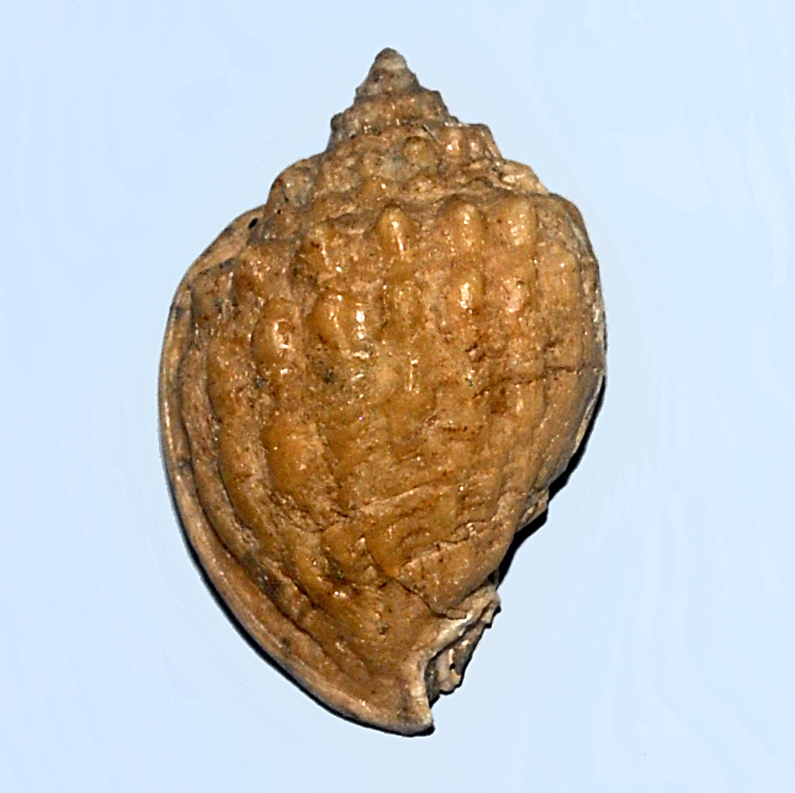
Fossil shell of Semicassis rondoletii

== Extinct Species ==
Extinct species within this genus include:

- Semicassis aldrichi Dall 1890 †
- Semicassis angasi Iredale 1927 †
- Semicassis deneseplicata Martin 1916 †
- Semicassis harpaeformis Lamarck 1803 †
- Semicassis labiata Perry 1811 †
- Semicassis monilifera Sowerby 1846 †
- Semicassis oligocalantica Vredenburg 1925 †
- Semicassis ovulum Ortmann 1900 †
- Semicassis pyshtensis Addicott 1976 †
- Semicassis reclusa Guppy 1873 †

Fossils of species within this genus have been found all over the world in sediments from Eocene to Quaternary (age range: 37.2 to 0.0 million years ago).
