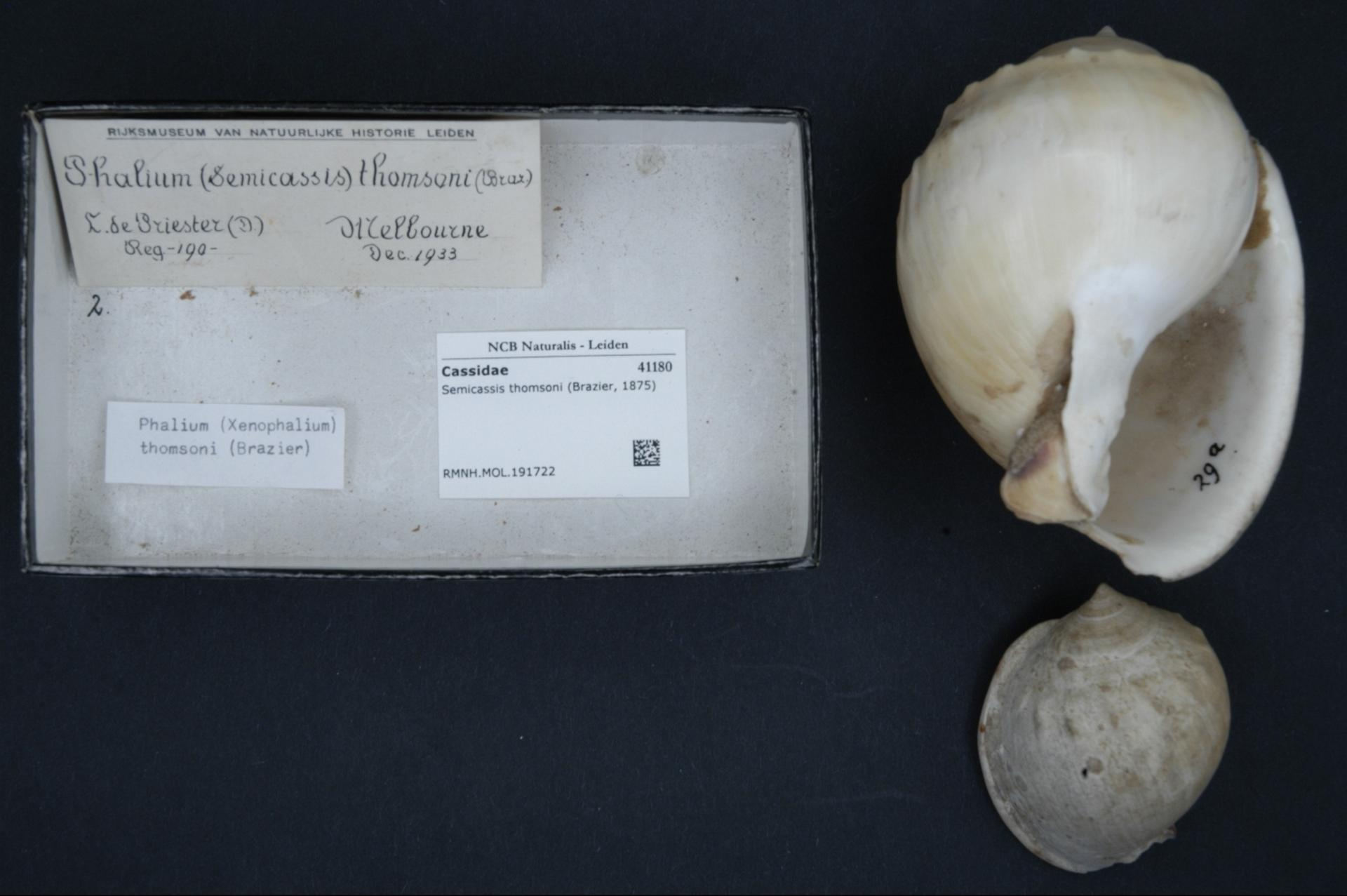

Scientific classification
- Kingdom: Animalia
- Phylum: Mollusca
- Class: Gastropoda
- Subclass: Caenogastropoda
- Order: Littorinimorpha
- Superfamily: Tonnoidea
- Family: Cassidae
- Genus: Semicassis
- Species: S. thomsoni

Binomial name
- Semicassis thomsoni (Brazier, 1875)

Synonyms
- Cassis (Casmaria) thomsoni Brazier, 1876 (basionym); Cassis thomsoni Brazier, 1876 (original combination); Semicassis (Semicassis) thomsoni (Brazier, 1876) · alternate representation; Phalium (Xenogalea) thomsoni (Brazier, 1876); Xenogalea thomsoni (Brazier, 1876); Xenogalea thomsoni palinodia Iredale, 1931

= Semicassis thomsoni =

Species of gastropod

Semicassis thomsoni is a species of large predatory sea snail, a marine gastropod mollusc in the family Cassidae, the helmet shells and their allies.

== Distribution ==
This marine species occurs in New Zealand. and in the Australian part of the Tasman Sea.
