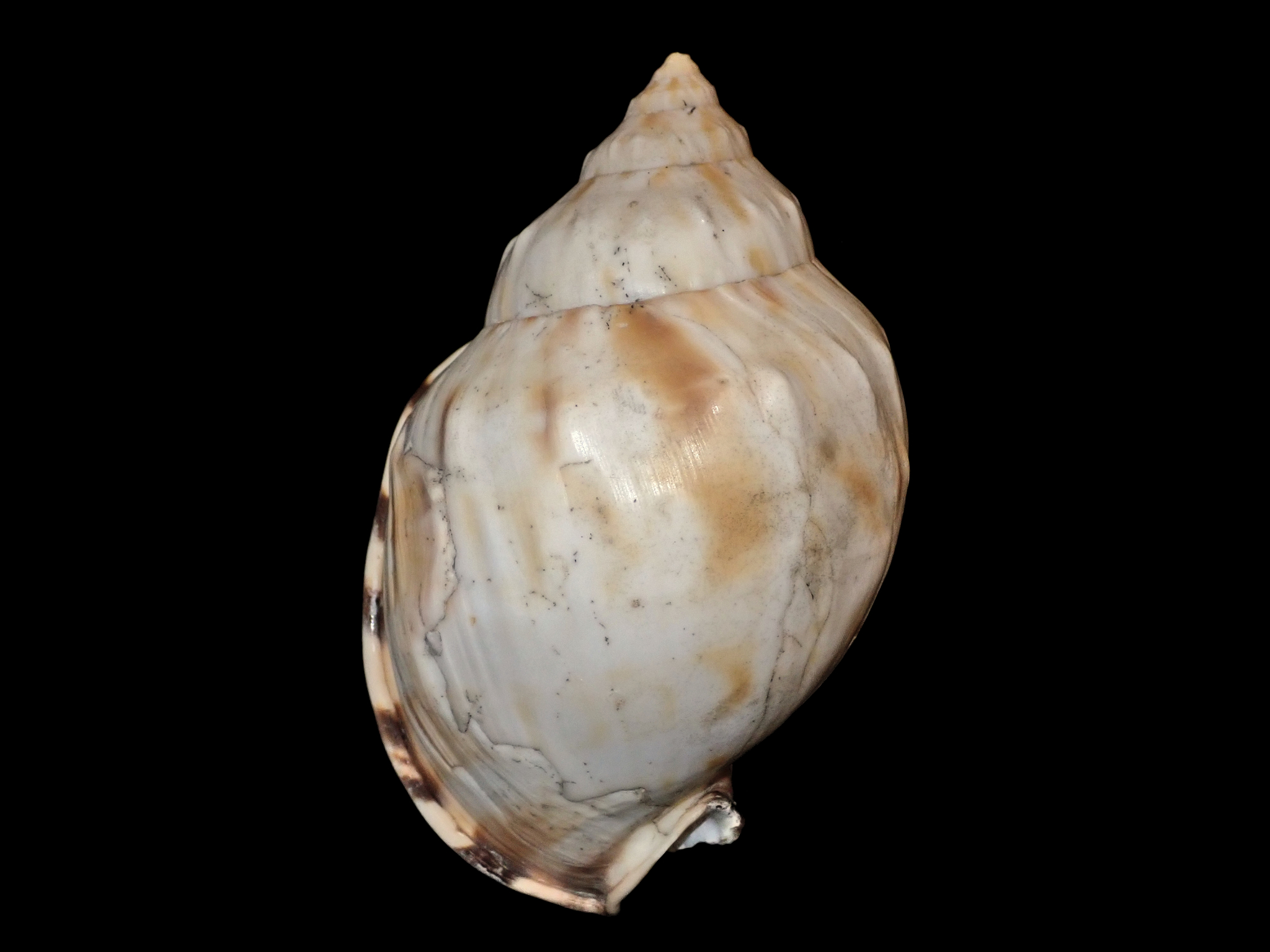

Scientific classification
- Kingdom: Animalia
- Phylum: Mollusca
- Class: Gastropoda
- Subclass: Caenogastropoda
- Order: Littorinimorpha
- Family: Cassidae
- Genus: Semicassis
- Species: S. royana

Binomial name
- Semicassis royana (Iredale, 1914)

Synonyms
- Cassidea royana Iredale, 1914

= Semicassis royana =

Species of gastropod

Semicassis royana is a species of medium-sized predatory sea snail, a marine gastropod mollusc in the family Cassidae, the helmet shells and their allies.

== Description ==
This species attains a size of 140 mm.

== Distribution ==
Pacific Ocean: New Zealand.
