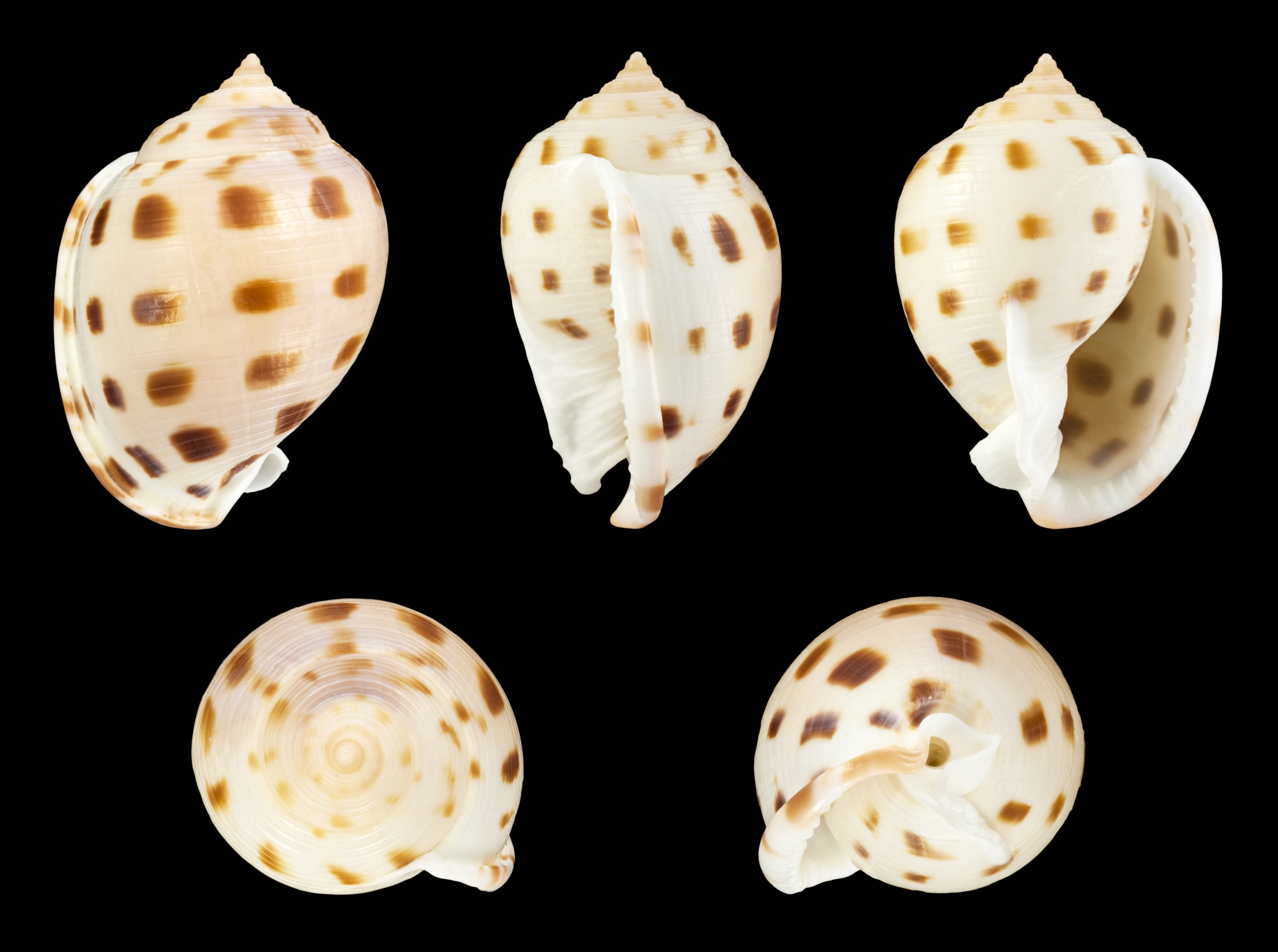
- Five views of a shell of Semicassis bisulcata var. booleyi

Scientific classification
- Kingdom: Animalia
- Phylum: Mollusca
- Class: Gastropoda
- Subclass: Caenogastropoda
- Order: Littorinimorpha
- Family: Cassidae
- Genus: Semicassis
- Species: S. bisulcata

Binomial name
- Semicassis bisulcata (Schubert, H. G. & A. J. Wagner, 1829)

Synonyms
- Buccinum areola Burrows, 1815; Buccinum tesselatum Wood, 1825; Buccinum tessellatum Wood, 1825; Cassis japonica Reeve, 1848; Cassis minor Küster, H.C., 1852; Cassis nucleus Küster, H.C., 1857; Cassis pfeifferi Hidalgo, J.G., 1871; Cassis saburon "Lamarck, J.B.P.A. de" Schubert, H.G. & A.J. Wagner, 1829; Phalium bisulcatum; Semicassis (Semicassis) bisulcata (Schubert, H.G. & A.J. Wagner, 1829); Semicassis nashi Iredale, T., 1931

= Semicassis bisulcata =

Species of gastropod

Semicassis bisulcata, common name: the Japanese bonnet, is a species of large sea snail, a marine gastropod mollusk in the family Cassidae, the helmet snails and bonnet snails.

== Description ==
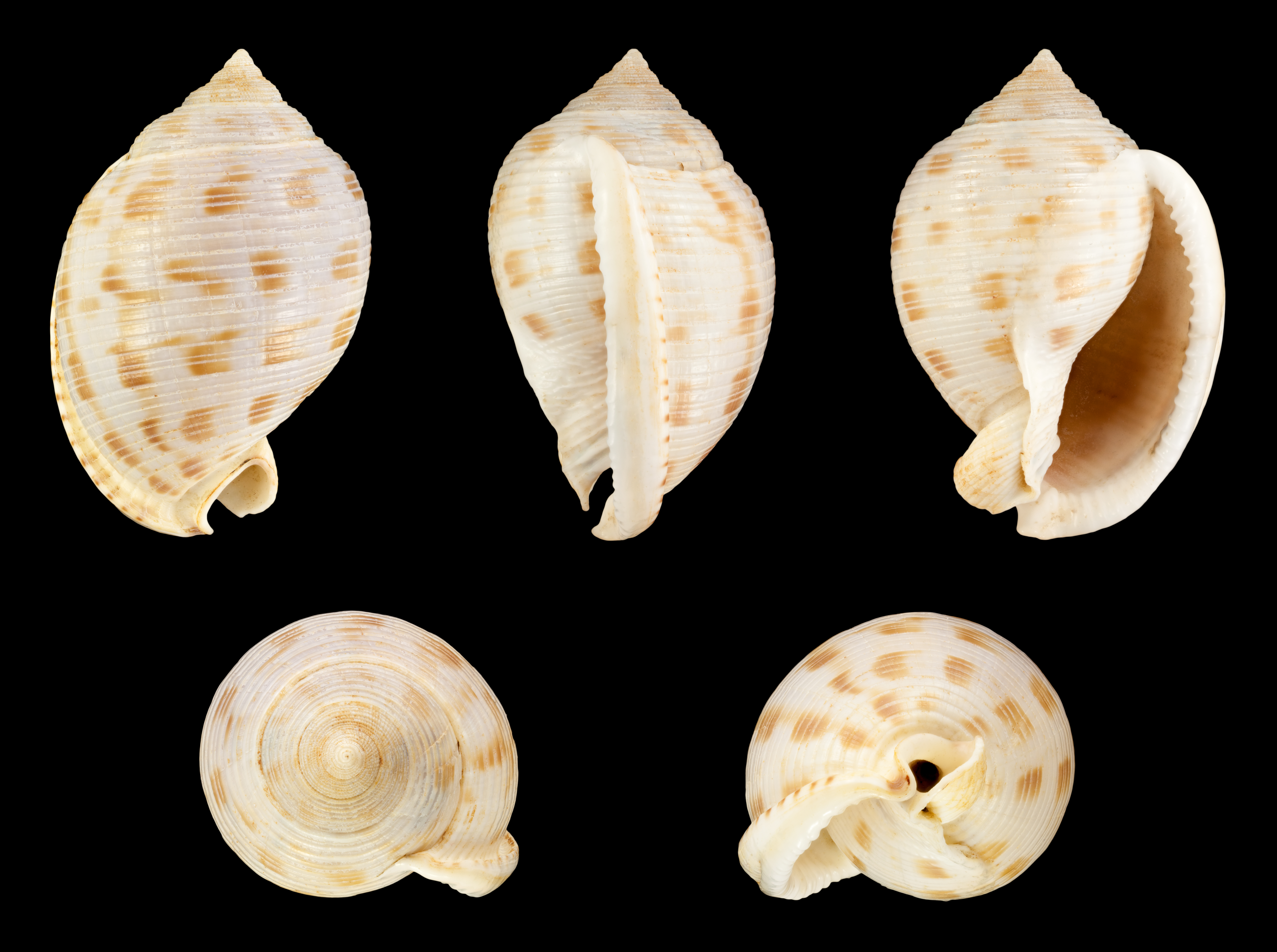
Semicassis bisulcata var. japonica

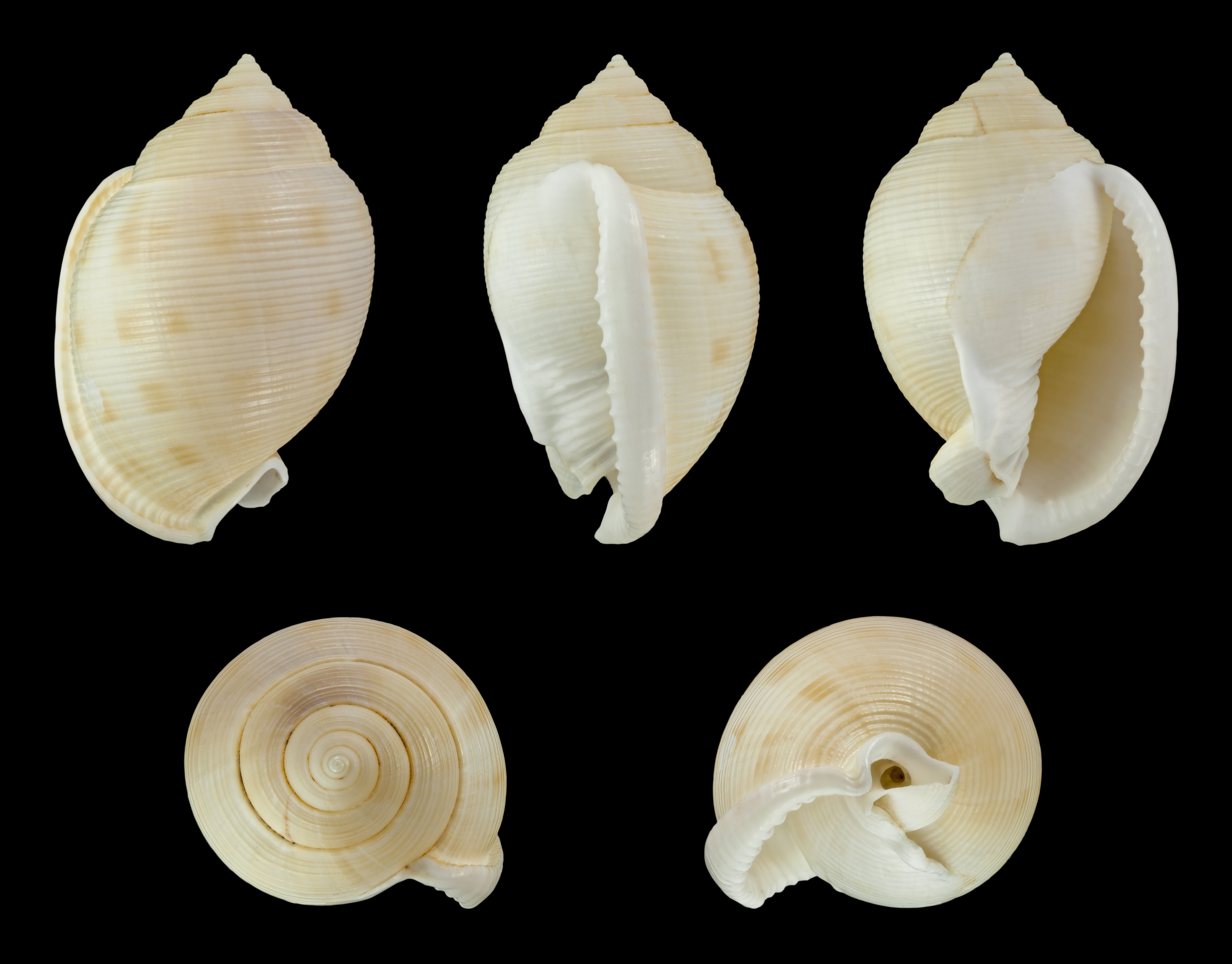
Semicassis bisulcata var. persimilis

The size of an adult shell varies between 25 mm and 85 mm. They are carnivorous and mainly feed on other smaller marine gastropods like Umbonium vestiarium.

== Distribution ==
This species occurs in the Red Sea and in the Indo-West Pacific.
