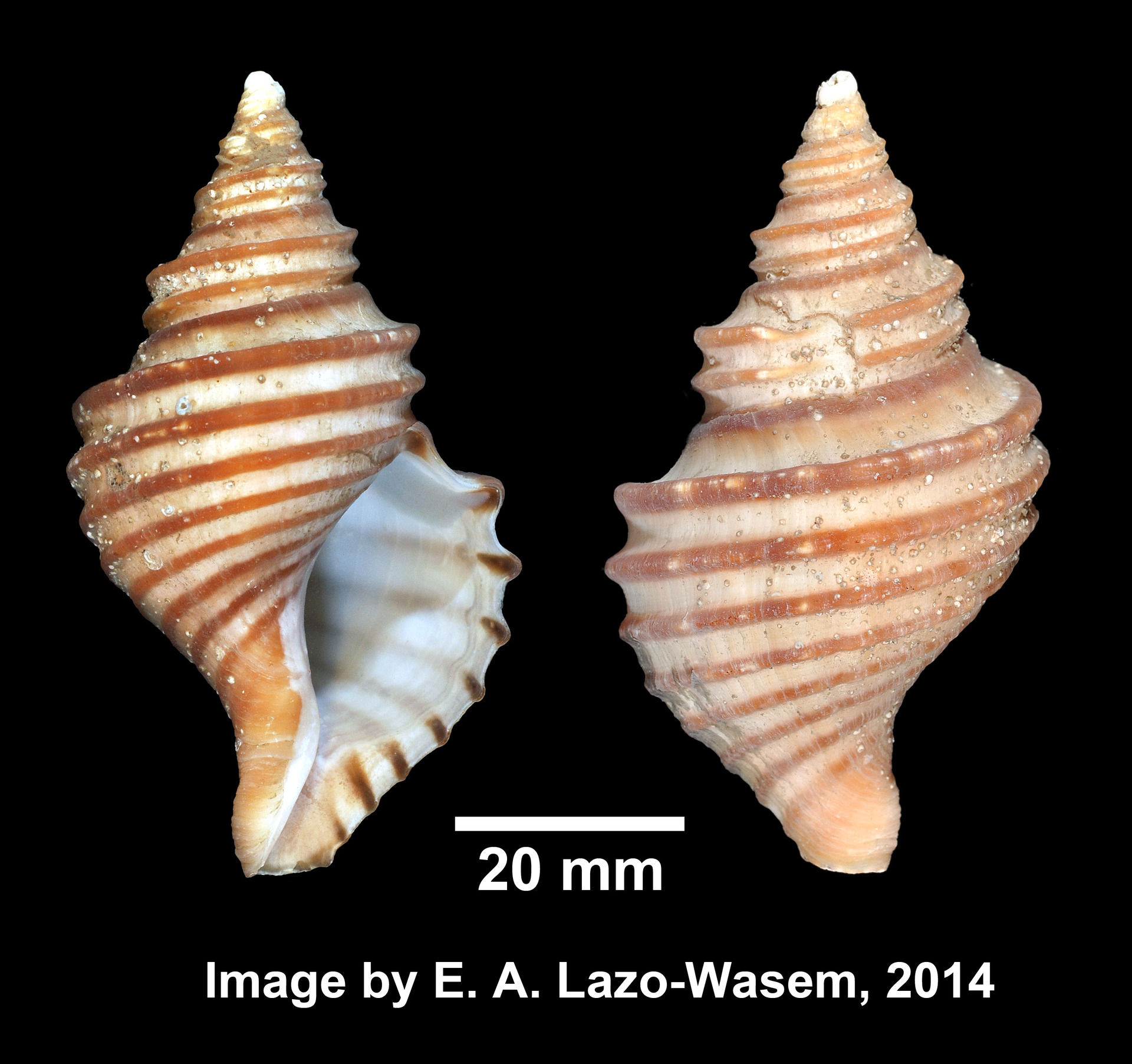

Scientific classification
- Kingdom: Animalia
- Phylum: Mollusca
- Class: Gastropoda
- Subclass: Caenogastropoda
- Order: Neogastropoda
- Family: Buccinidae
- Genus: Neptunea
- Species: N. decemcostata

Binomial name
- Neptunea decemcostata (Say, 1826)

= Neptunea decemcostata =

Species of mollusc

Neptunea decemcostata, the New England neptune, is a species of Neptunea and the state shell of Massachusetts. It is sometimes considered a subspecies of Neptunea lyrata, which it shares its common name with.
