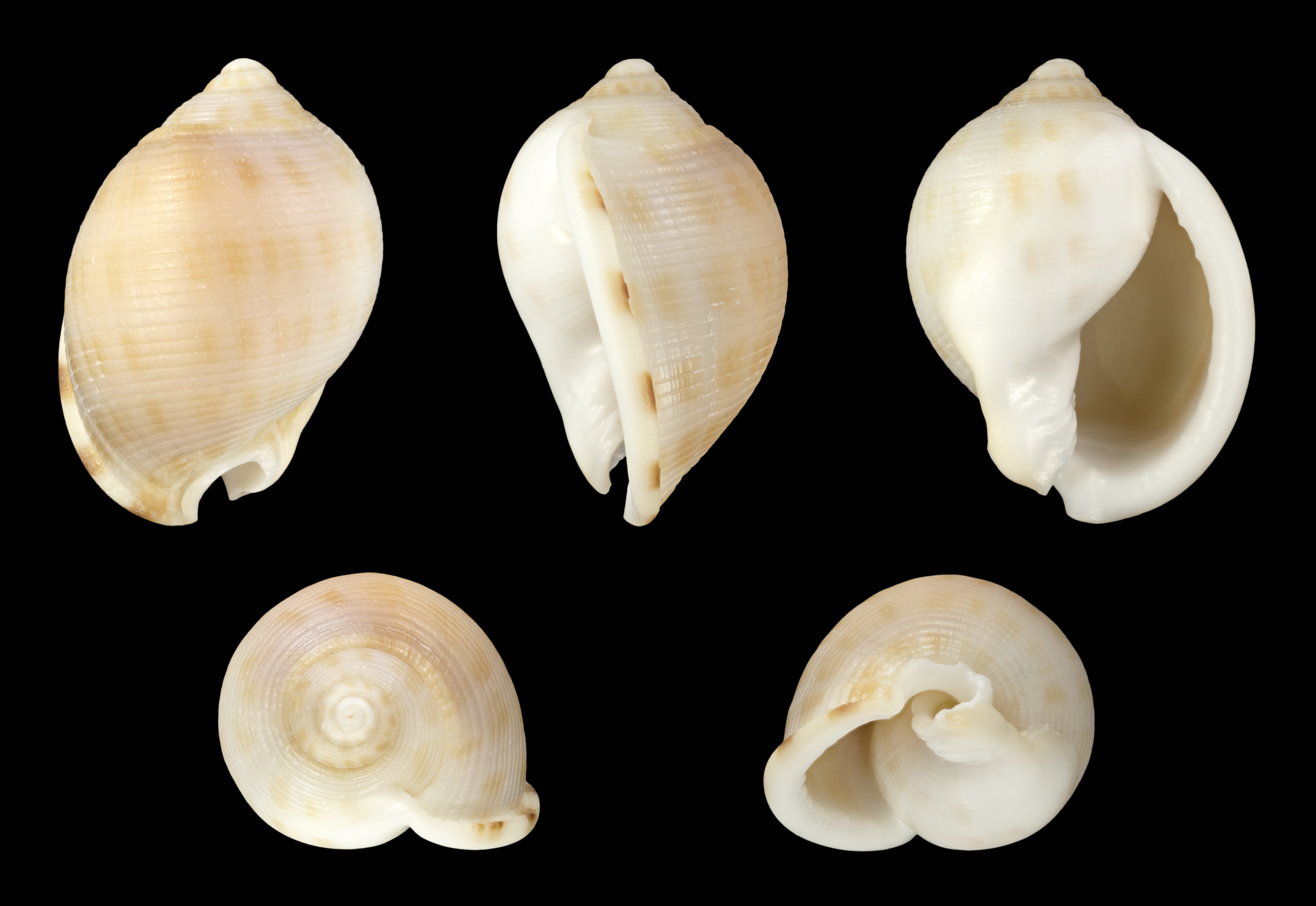

Scientific classification
- Kingdom: Animalia
- Phylum: Mollusca
- Class: Gastropoda
- Subclass: Caenogastropoda
- Order: Littorinimorpha
- Superfamily: Tonnoidea
- Family: Cassidae
- Genus: Semicassis
- Species: S. saburon

Binomial name
- Semicassis saburon (Bruguière, 1792)

Synonyms
- Bulbus globosus (Jeffreys, 1885); Cassidea saburon Bruguière, 1792; Cassis adansoni Locard, 1886; Cassis laevigata Defrance, 1817 †; Cassis platystomus Brugnone, 1880; Cassis saburon (Bruguière, 1792); Cassis saburon var. costulata Argüelles, 1909; Cassis saburon var. crassa Pallary, 1900; Cassis saburon var. minor Pallary, 1900; Cassis saburon var. monterosatoi Bayer, 1935; Cassis saburon var. nigra Argüelles, 1909; Cassis saburon var. platystoma Gignoux, 1913; Cassis saburoni Locard, 1886; Cassis texta Bronn, 1827 † (dubious synonym); Cassis texta var. striata Philippi, 1836; Natica globosa Jeffreys, 1885; Phalium saburon (Bruguière, 1792); Semicassis (Semicassis) saburon (Bruguière, 1792) · alternate representation; Semicassis miolaevigata Sacco, 1890; Semicassis saburon evanescens Settepassi, 1970 (not available, published in a work which does not consistently use binomial nomenclature (ICZN art. 11.4)); Semicassis saburon inaequalis Settepassi, 1970 (not available, published in a work which does not consistently use binomial nomenclature (ICZN art. 11.4)); Semicassis saburon multicostata Settepassi, 1970 (not available, published in a work which does not consistently use binomial nomenclature (ICZN art. 11.4))

= Semicassis saburon =

Species of gastropod

Semicassis saburon is a species of large sea snail, a marine gastropod mollusc in the family Cassidae, the helmet snails and bonnet snails.

== Description ==
The shell of Semicassis saburon can reach a size of about 35–75 millimetres (1.4–3.0 in).

== Distribution ==
This species is present in the Mediterranean Sea and the eastern Atlantic Ocean, from the Bay of Biscay south to Ghana, and west to the Azores, and the Canaries.
