= List of U.S. state shells =

This is a list of official state shells for those states of the United States that have chosen to select one as part of their state insignia. In 1965, North Carolina was the first state to designate an official state shell, the Scotch bonnet. Since then, 14 other states have designated an official state shell.

These are seashells, the shells of various marine mollusks including both gastropod and bivalves. Each one was chosen to represent a maritime state, based on the fact that the species occurs in that state and was considered suitable to represent the state, either because of the species' commercial importance as a local seafood item, or because of its beauty, rarity, exceptional size, or other features.

== Table ==
State	Shell	Image	Year designated
Alabama	Johnstone's junonia Scaphella junonia ssp. johnstoneae		1990
Connecticut	Eastern oyster Crassostrea virginica		1989
Delaware	Channeled whelk Busycotypus canaliculatus		2014
Florida	Horse conch Triplofusus papillosus		1969
Georgia	Knobbed whelk Busycon carica		1987
Massachusetts	New England Neptune Neptunea lyrata ssp. decemcostata		1987
Mississippi	Eastern oyster Crassostrea virginica		1974
New Jersey	Knobbed whelk Busycon carica ssp. gmelin		1995
New York	Bay scallop Argopecten irradians		1988
North Carolina	Scotch bonnet Semicassis granulata		1965
Oregon	Oregon hairy triton Fusitriton oregonensis		1989
Rhode Island	Quahaug Mercenaria mercenaria		1987
South Carolina	Lettered olive Oliva sayana		1984
Texas	Lightning whelk Sinistrofulgur perversum ssp. pulleyi		1987
Virginia	Eastern oyster Crassostrea virginica		1974

== See also ==
- List of U.S. state, district, and territorial insignia
