= Semicassis thachi =

Scientific classification
- Kingdom: Animalia
- Phylum: Mollusca
- Class: Gastropoda
- Subclass: Caenogastropoda
- Order: Littorinimorpha
- Family: Cassidae
- Genus: Semicassis
- Species: S. thachi

Binomial name
- Semicassis thachi Kreipl, Alf & Eggeling, 2006

Species of gastropod

Semicassis thachi is a species of large sea snail, a marine gastropod mollusc in the family Cassidae, the helmet snails and bonnet snails.
