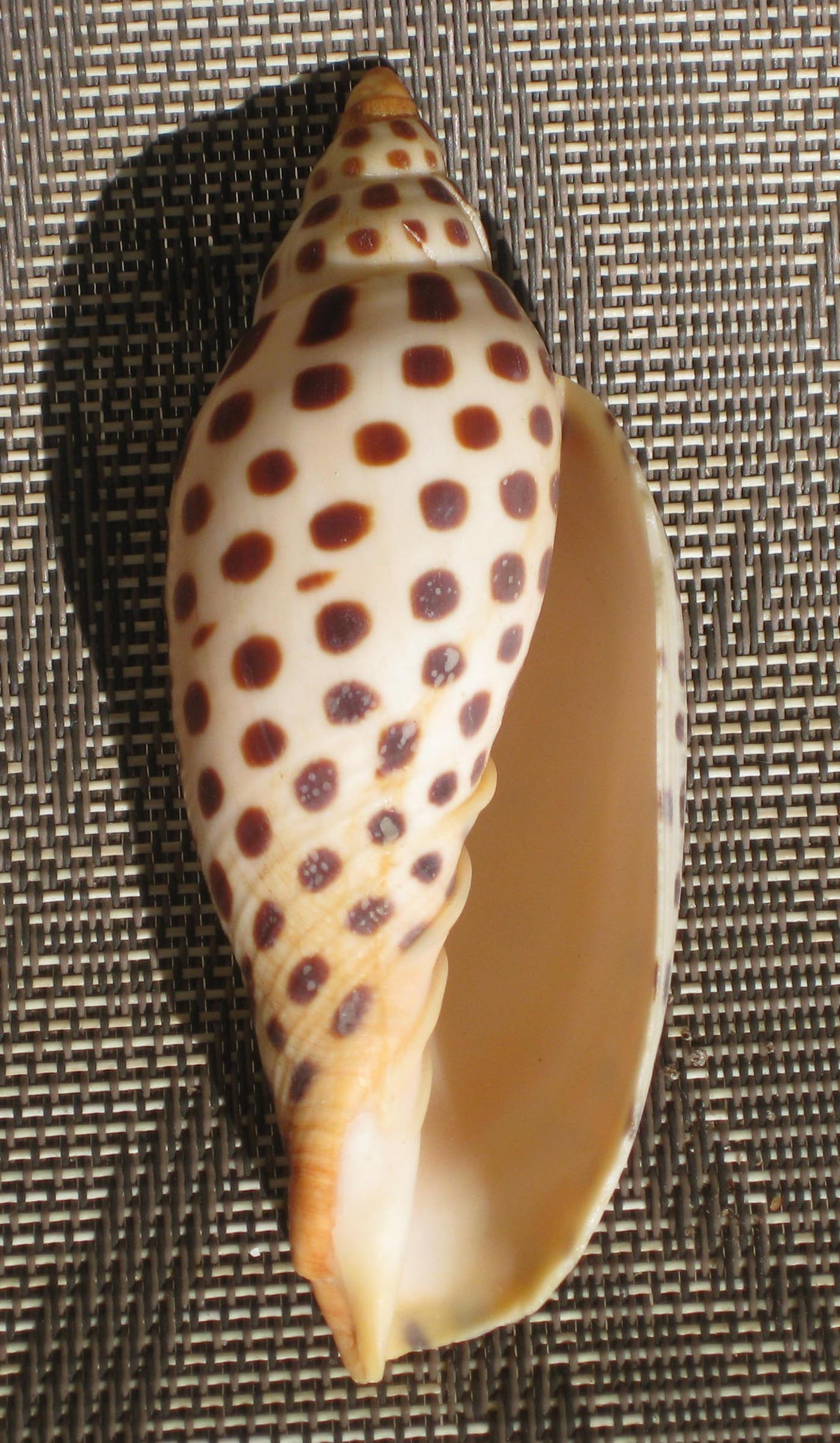
- A shell of Scaphella junonia trawled by a shrimp boat off of the SW coast of Florida

Scientific classification
- Kingdom: Animalia
- Phylum: Mollusca
- Class: Gastropoda
- Subclass: Caenogastropoda
- Order: Neogastropoda
- Family: Volutidae
- Genus: Scaphella
- Species: S. junonia

Binomial name
- Scaphella junonia (Lamarck, 1804)

Subspecies
- S. j. junonia; S. j. johnstoneae; S. j. butleri; S. j. elizabethae; S. j. curryi

Synonyms
- Voluta junonia Lamarck, 1804; Aurinia junonia Lamarck, 1804; Scapha junonia Lamarck, 1804; Maculopeplum junonia Lamarck, 1804; Scaphella butleri Clench, 1953; Scaphella johnstoneae Clench, 1953; Scaphella capelettii Petuch, 1994

= Scaphella junonia =

Species of gastropod

Scaphella junonia, common names the junonia, or Juno's volute, is a species of large sea snail, a marine gastropod mollusk in the family Volutidae, the volutes.

This species lives in water from 29 m to 126 m depth in the tropical Western Atlantic. Because of its deepwater habitat, the shell usually only washes up onto beaches after strong storms, or hurricanes.

The species is named after the ancient Roman goddess Juno.

== Distribution ==
Scaphella junonia is found throughout Florida to Texas and the Gulf of Mexico.

- A subspecies, Scaphella junonia johnstoneae, is found off of Alabama and is the state shell of that state. It is named for Kathleen Yerger Johnstone, an amateur conchologist from Alabama who published two books on seashell collecting.
- Another subspecies, Scaphella junonia butleri, is found off of the Yucatan.

== Shell description ==
The largest recorded shell of Scaphella junonia is 154 mm in length. The shell is cream in color with about 12 spiral rows of somewhat squarish brown dots. The large protoconch is tan. The aperture of the shell is almost 3/4 of the length of the shell.

== Human relevance ==
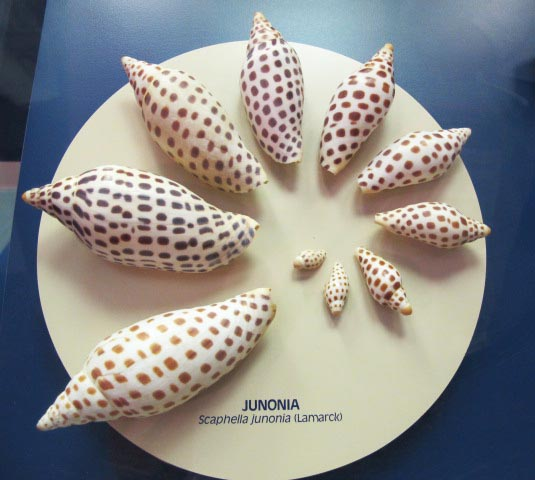
An exhibit at the Bailey-Matthews National Shell Museum on Sanibel, Florida shows a growth series of this species.

The shell was historically greatly prized for its beauty and apparent rarity. It is however commonly taken (accidentally as bycatch) from deeper water during commercial trawling by shrimp fishermen in the Gulf of Mexico. This source provides plenty of specimens for the shell trade, and so the price of a specimen shell is relatively low. However, the shell is still very hard to find naturally cast up on beaches, so people who find a junonia while shelling on Sanibel Island, Florida, often get their picture in the local newspapers.
