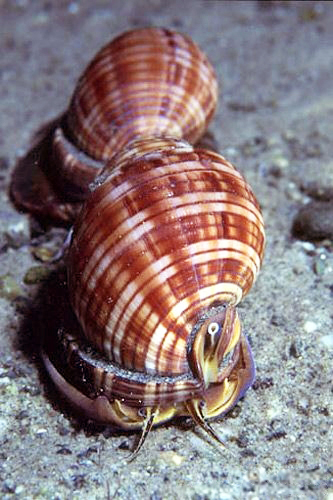
- Two live individuals in Archi, Reggio Calabria, Italy

Scientific classification
- Domain: Eukaryota
- Kingdom: Animalia
- Phylum: Mollusca
- Class: Gastropoda
- Subclass: Caenogastropoda
- Order: Littorinimorpha
- Family: Cassidae
- Genus: Semicassis
- Species: S. undulata

Binomial name
- Semicassis undulata (Gmelin, 1791)

Synonyms
- Phalium undulatum (Gmelin, 1791); Semicassis granulata undulata (Gmelin, 1791)

= Semicassis undulata =

Species of gastropod

Semicassis undulata is a Mediterranean species of medium-sized sea snail, a marine gastropod mollusc in the subfamily Cassinae, the helmet snails and bonnet snails.

== Taxonomy ==
This taxon was previously sometimes referred to at subspecies level as Semicassis granulata undulata, but in 2019, the World Register of Marine Species lists this Mediterranean taxon as a separate species from Semicassis granulata, which is a Western Atlantic taxon.

== Distribution ==
This species occurs in the Mediterranean Sea and in the Atlantic Ocean off Northwest Africa and the Macaronesian Islands.
