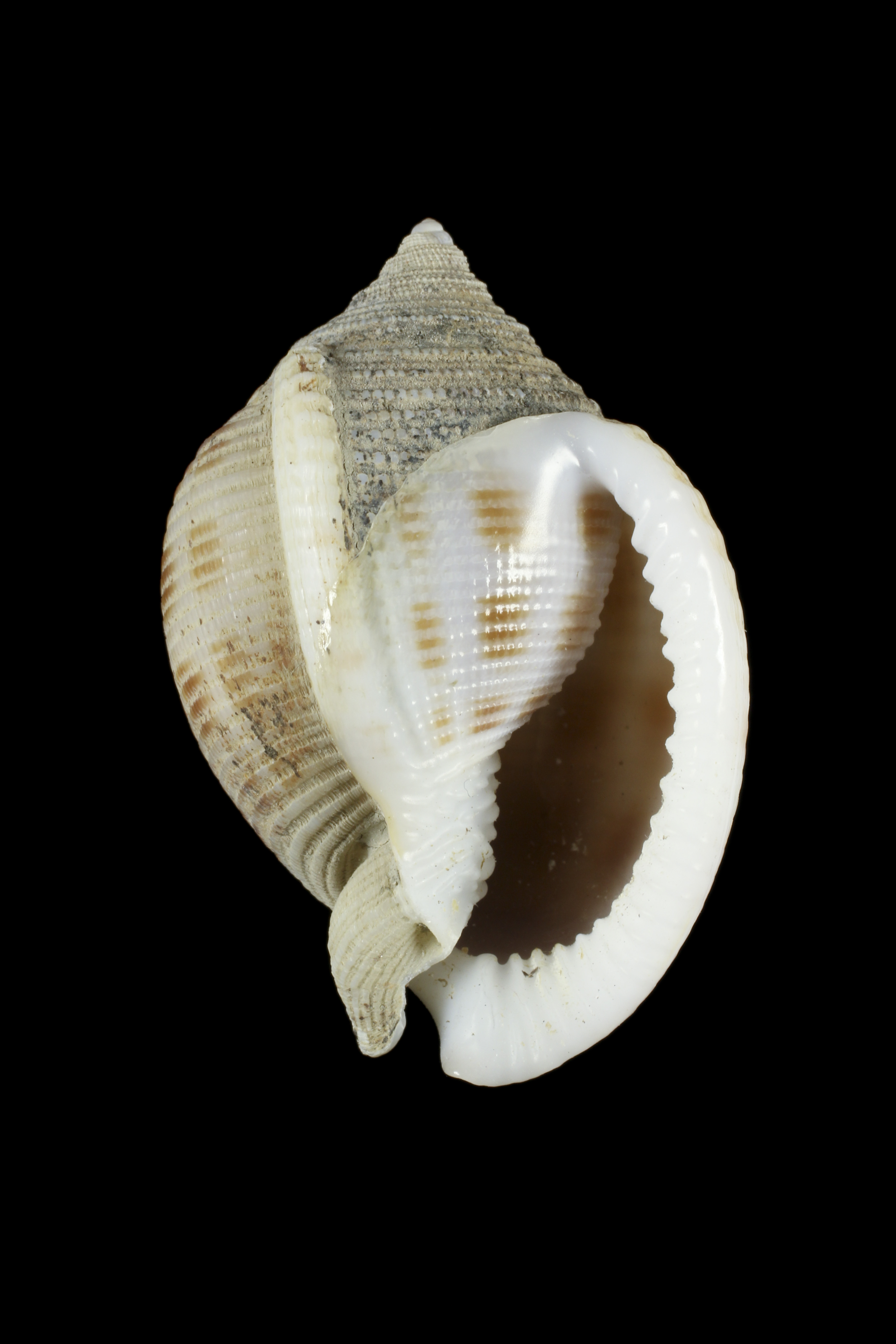
- Shell of Semicassis bondarevi (specimen at MNHN, Paris)

Scientific classification
- Kingdom: Animalia
- Phylum: Mollusca
- Class: Gastropoda
- Subclass: Caenogastropoda
- Order: Littorinimorpha
- Superfamily: Tonnoidea
- Family: Cassidae
- Genus: Semicassis
- Species: S. bondarevi

Binomial name
- Semicassis bondarevi Mühlhäusser & Parth, 1993

Synonyms
- Phalium (Semicassis) vector R. T. Abbott, 1993 (junior synonym); Semicassis (Semicassis) bondarevi Mühlhäusser & Parth, 1993 · alternate representation

= Semicassis bondarevi =

Species of marine gastropod

Semicassis bondarevi is a species of marine gastropod in the family Cassidae.

== Distribution ==
This species occurs on the submarine Mascarene Plateau (primarily the Saya de Malha Bank) and southern Mozambique.; also off Papua New Guinea.
