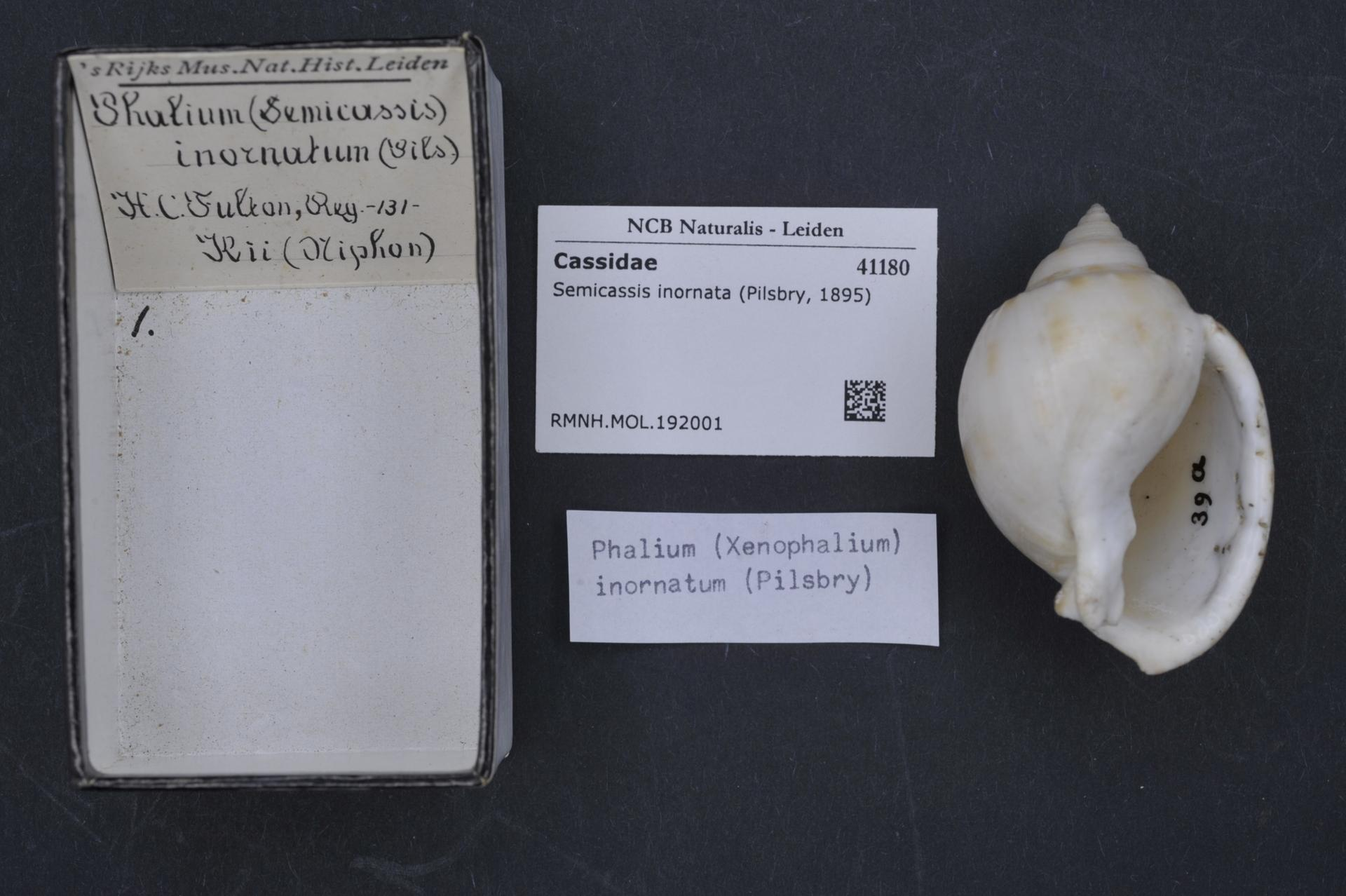

Scientific classification
- Kingdom: Animalia
- Phylum: Mollusca
- Class: Gastropoda
- Subclass: Caenogastropoda
- Order: Littorinimorpha
- Family: Cassidae
- Genus: Semicassis
- Species: S. inornata

Binomial name
- Semicassis inornata (Pilsbry, 1895)

Synonyms
- Cassis achatina var. inornata Pilsbry, 1895 (basionym); Phalium (Semicassis) inornatum Pilsbry, 1895; Phalium (Xenophalium) inornatum (Pilsbry, 1895); Semicassis (Semicassis) inornata (Pilsbry, 1895) · alternate representation; Semicassis (Xenophalium) inornata (Pilsbry, 1895); Semicassis (Xenophalium) inornata debiae Goodwin, 2008

= Semicassis inornata =

Species of gastropod

Semicassis inornata is a species of large sea snail, a marine gastropod mollusc in the family Cassidae, the helmet snails and bonnet snails.

== Distribution ==
This marine species occurs off Japan.
