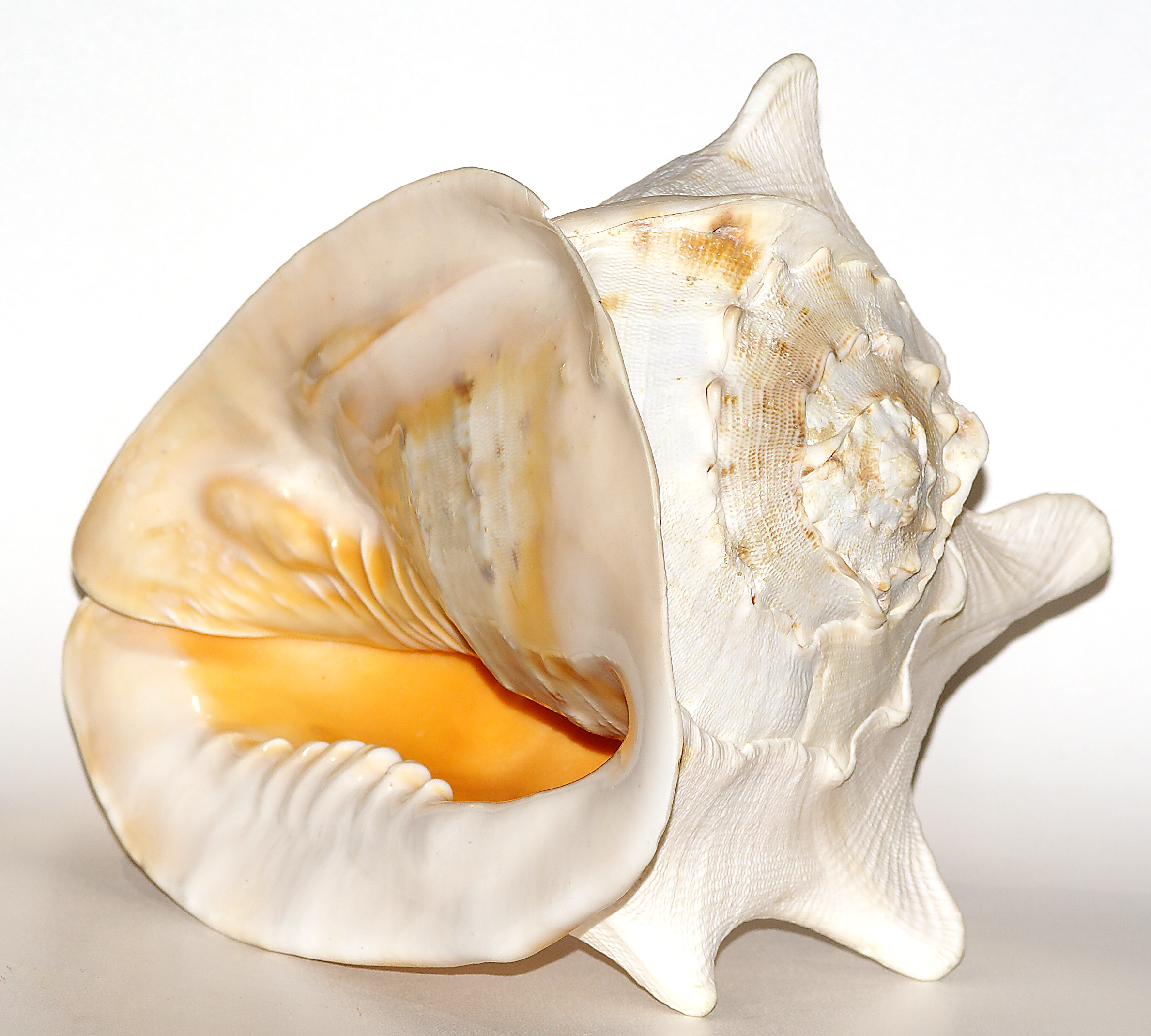
- A shell of Cassis cornuta
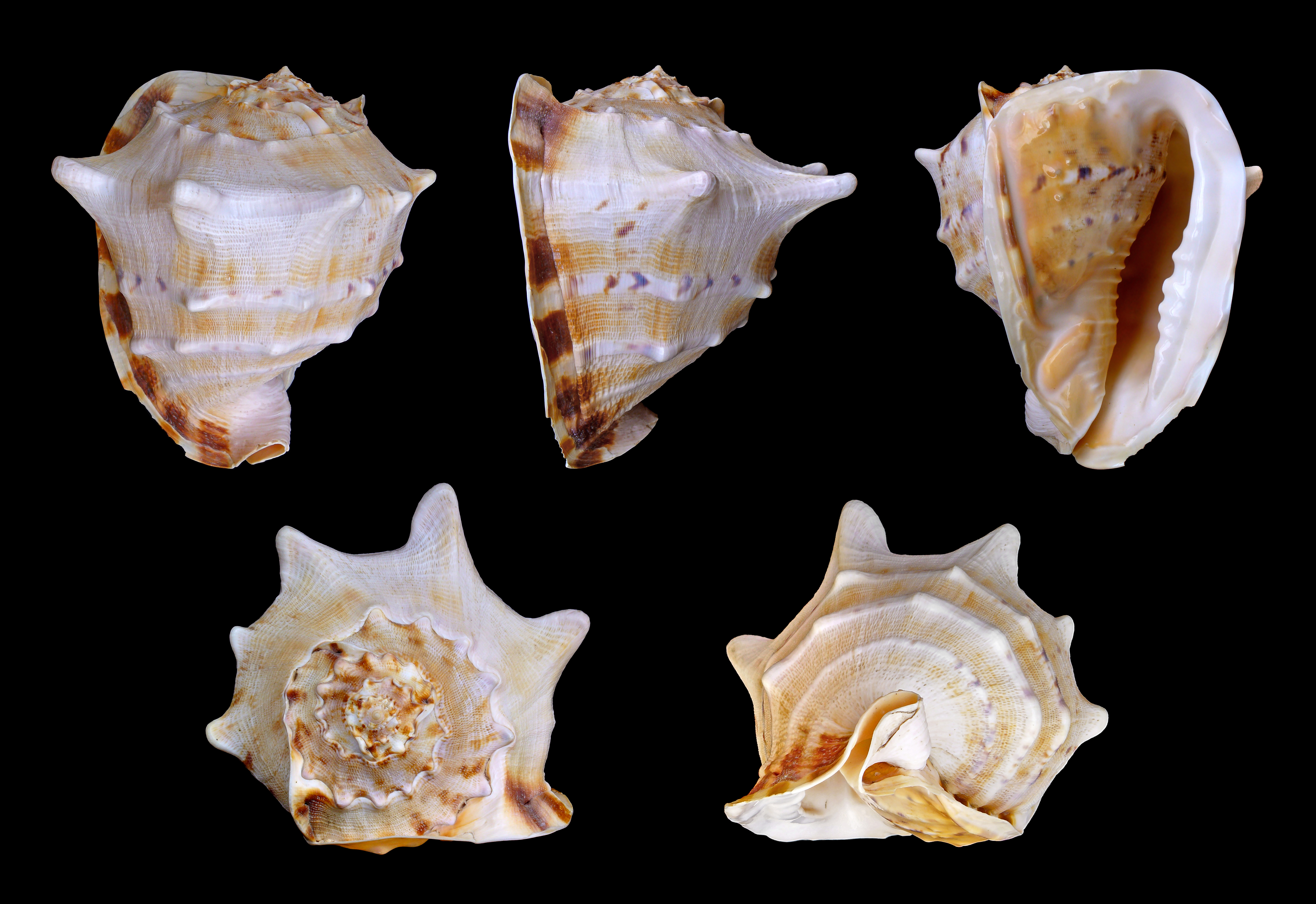
- Five views of a shell of Cassis cornuta

Scientific classification
- Kingdom: Animalia
- Phylum: Mollusca
- Class: Gastropoda
- Subclass: Caenogastropoda
- Order: Littorinimorpha
- Superfamily: Tonnoidea
- Family: Cassidae
- Genus: Cassis; Scopoli, 1777

Type species
- Buccinum cornutum Linnaeus, 1758

Species
- See text

Synonyms
- Cassidea Bruguière, 1789; Cassis (Cassis) Scopoli, 1777· accepted, alternate representation; Cassis (Hypocassis) Iredale, 1927· accepted, alternate representation; Cassis (Morionella) Dall, 1909 †· accepted, alternate representation; Goniogalea Mörch, 1857; Hypocassis Iredale, 1927; Nannocassis Iredale, 1927

= Cassis (gastropod) =

Cassis Temporal range: Paleocene - Recent

Genus of gastropods

Cassis, common name the helmet shells, is a genus of very large sea snails, marine gastropod mollusks in the family Cassidae, the helmet shells and their allies. This is the type genus of the subfamily Cassinae.

== Species ==
The genus Cassis includes extant and extinct species:

- Cassis abbotti Bouchet, 1988
- † Cassis altispira Beu 2010
- † Cassis birmanica Vredenburg 1921
- † Cassis brasili (Cossmann & Pissarro, 1905)
- † Cassis calusa Petuch and Berschauer 2018
- Cassis cornuta (Linnaeus, 1758)
- † Cassis costulifera Beu 2010
- † Cassis delta Parker 1948
- † Cassis depressior Martin 1879
- Cassis fimbriata Quoy & Gaimard, 1833
- Cassis flammea (Linnaeus, 1758)
- † Cassis flintensis Mansfield 1940
- † Cassis floridensis Tucker and Wilson 1932
- † Cassis glaucoides Martin 1879
- † Cassis herklotsi Martin 1879
- † Cassis ketteri Parodiz and Tripp 1992
- Cassis kreipli Morrison, 2003
- † Cassis lelongi Gain, Belliard & Le Renard, 2017
- † Cassis maccormacki Olsson 1928
- Cassis madagascariensis Lamarck, 1822
- † Cassis mammillaris Grateloup 1927
- Cassis nana Tenison-Woods, 1879
- † Cassis nigellensis Gain, Belliard & Le Renard, 2017
- Cassis norai Prati Musetti, 1995
- Cassis nummulitiphila Sacco 1890
- † Cassis parfouruorum Gain, Belliard & Le Renard, 2017
- Cassis patamakanthini Parth, 2000
- † Cassis powelli Petuch and Berschauer, 2018
- Cassis retusa Michelotti 1861
- Cassis subtuberosa Hanna 1926
- Cassis sulcifera Sowerby 1850
- Cassis tessellata Gmelin, 1791
- Cassis togata White 1887
- Cassis tuberosa (Linnaeus, 1758)
- Cassis vialensis Fuchs 1870

Fossils of the sea snails within this genus have been found all over the world in sediments from Paleocene to Recent (age range: 66 to 0 million years ago).

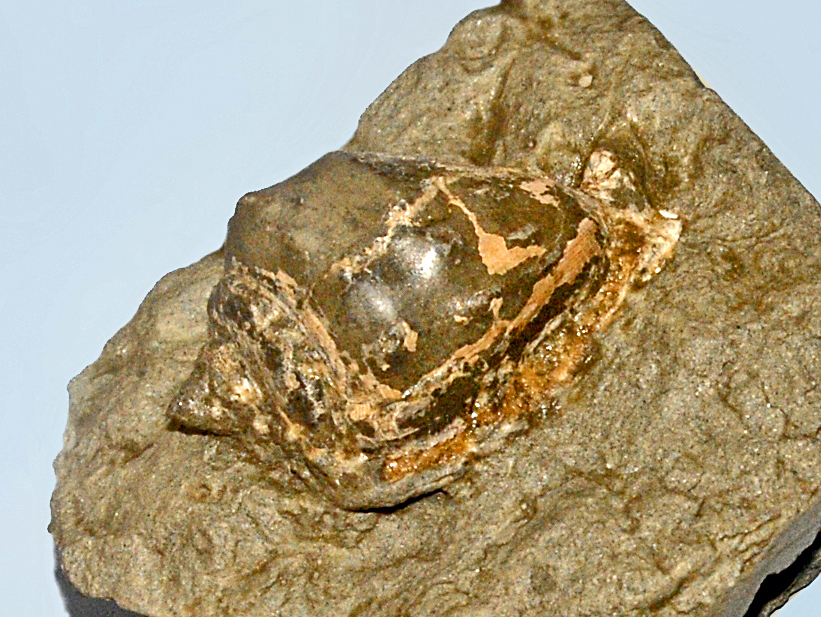
Fossil shell of Cassis mammillaris

Species brought into synonymy

- Cassis achatina Lamarck, 1816: synonym of Semicassis labiata (Perry, 1811)
- Cassis areola (Linnaeus, 1758): synonym of Phalium areola (Linnaeus, 1758)
- Cassis bituberculosa Martens, 1901: synonym of Echinophoria bituberculosa (Martens, 1901)
- Cassis callosa Röding, 1798: synonym of Nassarius gibbulosus (Linnaeus, 1758)
- Cassis centiquadrata (Valenciennes, 1832): synonym of Semicassis centiquadrata (Valenciennes, 1832)
- Cassis cernica Sowerby III, 1888: synonym of Casmaria ponderosa ponderosa (Link, 1807)
- Cassis coarctata G.B. Sowerby I, 1825: synonym of Cypraecassis coarctata (G.B. Sowerby I, 1825)
- Cassis coronadoi Crosse, 1867: synonym of Echinophoria coronadoi (Crosse, 1867)
- Cassis dalli Anderson, 1929: synonym of Echinophoria hadra (Woodring & Olsson, 1957)
- Cassis glans Röding, 1798: synonym of Demoulia abbreviata (Gmelin, 1791)
- Cassis glauca (Linnaeus, 1758): synonym of Phalium glaucum (Linnaeus, 1758)
- Cassis globulus Menke, 1829: synonym of Demoulia ventricosa (Lamarck, 1816)
- Cassis gracilenta Yokoyama, 1928: synonym of Cyllene gracilenta (Yokoyama, 1928)
- Cassis japonica Reeve, 1848: synonym of Semicassis bisulcata (Schubert & Wagner, 1829)
- Cassis labrosa Martini, 1773: synonym of Malea pomum (Linnaeus, 1758)
- Cassis ringens Swainson, 1822: synonym of Malea ringens (Swainson, 1822)
- Cassis rufa (Linnaeus, 1758): synonym of Cypraecassis rufa (Linnaeus, 1758)
- Cassis spinosa (Gronovius, 1781): synonym of Cassis tessellata Gmelin, 1791
- Cassis tenuis Wood, 1828: synonym of Cypraecassis tenuis (Wood, 1828)
- Cassis vibex (Linnaeus, 1758): synonym of Casmaria erinaceus (Linnaeus, 1758)
- Cassis wyvillei Watson, 1886: synonym of Echinophoria wyvillei (Watson, 1886)
