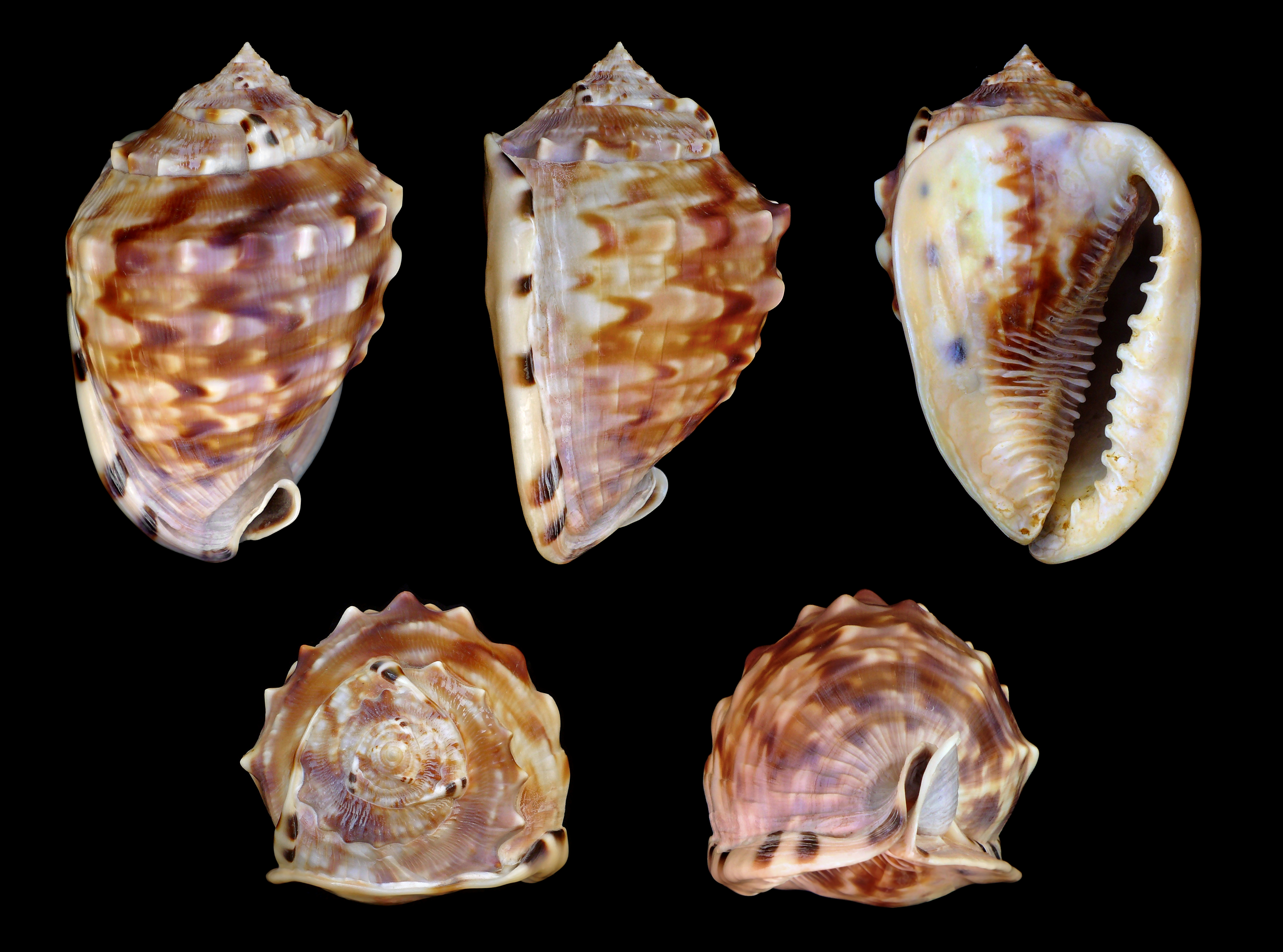
- Five views of a shell of Cassis flammea
- Apparently Secure (NatureServe)

Scientific classification
- Kingdom: Animalia
- Phylum: Mollusca
- Class: Gastropoda
- Subclass: Caenogastropoda
- Order: Littorinimorpha
- Family: Cassidae
- Genus: Cassis
- Species: C. flammea

Binomial name
- Cassis flammea (Linnaeus, 1758)

Synonyms
- Buccinum flammeum Linnaeus, 1758; Buccinum plicatum Linnaeus, 1758; Cassis (Cassis) flammea (Linnaeus, 1758); Cassis alba Perry, 1811; Cassis marmorata Röding, 1798

= Cassis flammea =

Species of gastropod

Cassis flammea is a species of large sea snail, a marine gastropod mollusk in the family Cassidae, the helmet snails and bonnet snails.

== Distribution ==
Cassis flammea is found in Florida, the Caribbean, and Bahamas. Its abundance has decreased due to overcollection in some areas.

== Description ==
It has a shell with shades of reddish-brown with wavy stripes. There are dark stripes on the outer lip of the shell. The lip around the aperture forms a triangle shape. The shell may reach a maximum of 7 inches in length. The shell may be covered by algae or other sessile marine organisms.

The maximum recorded shell length is 154 mm.

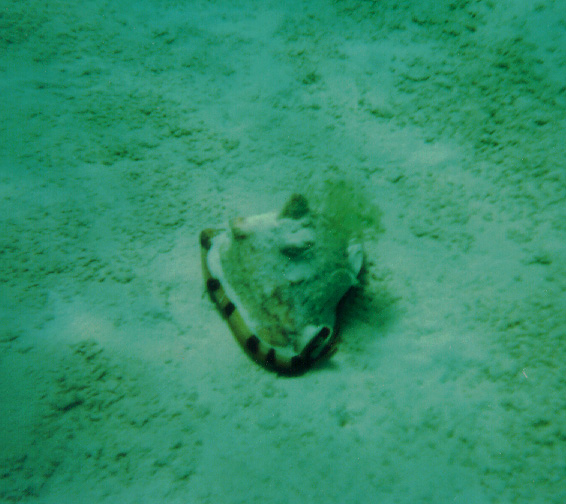
Cassis flammea feeding on algal mat in sand, Bamboo Point, San Salvador Island, Bahamas

== Habitat ==
Cassis flammea inhabits shallow tropical waters, in the depth range of 10 to 35 ft, usually in the sand around reefs.

The minimum recorded depth for this species is 1 m; maximum recorded depth is 12 m.

== Feeding habits ==
These sea snails feed on sea urchins, which they typically hunt at night.
