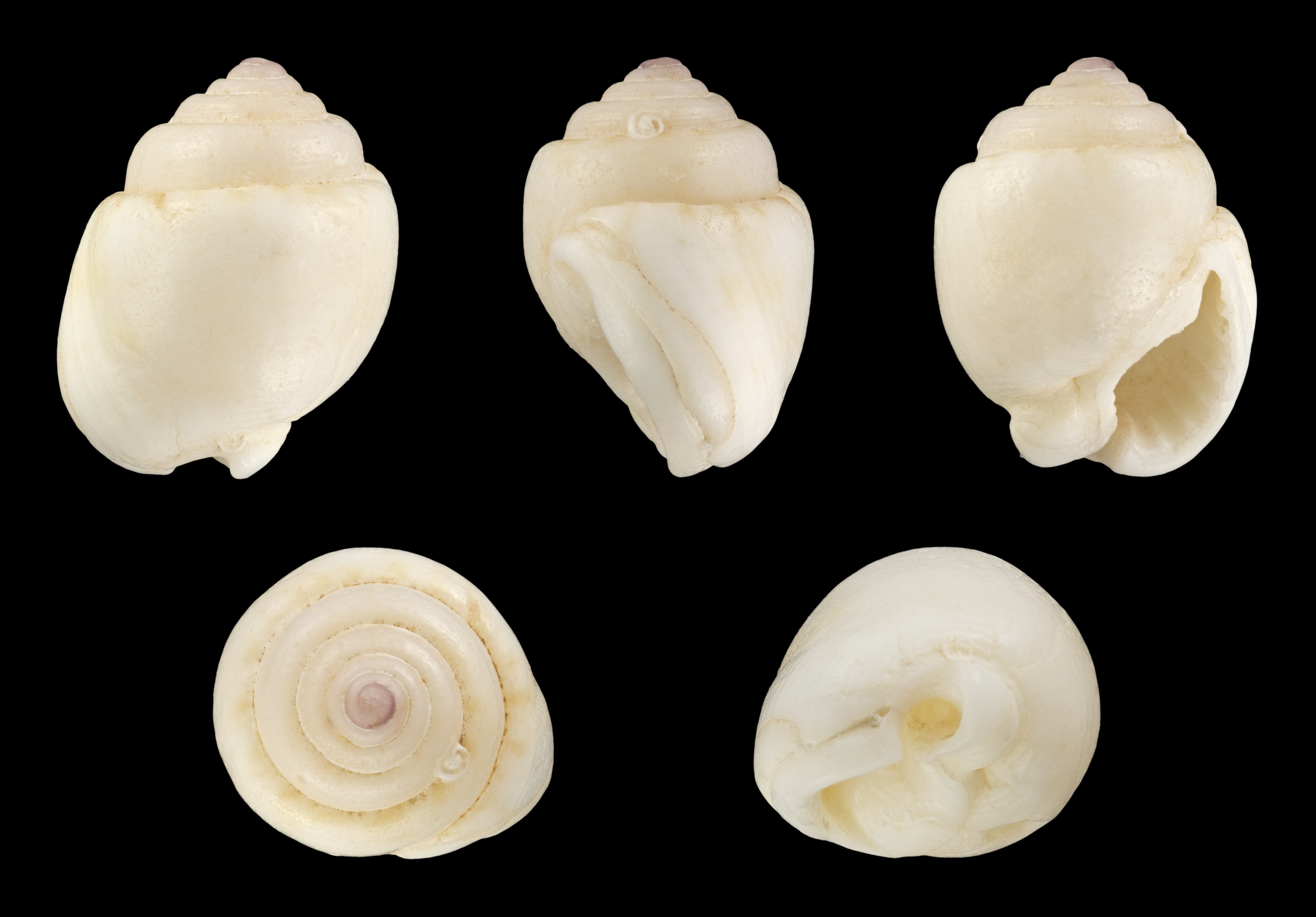
- Five views of a shell of Demoulia obtusata

Scientific classification
- Kingdom: Animalia
- Phylum: Mollusca
- Class: Gastropoda
- Subclass: Caenogastropoda
- Order: Neogastropoda
- Family: Nassariidae
- Genus: Demoulia
- Species: D. obtusata

Binomial name
- Demoulia obtusata (Link, 1807)

Synonyms
- Buccinum obtusatum Link, 1807; Demoulea crassa A. Adams, 1853; Demoulea pinguis A. Adams, 1853; Demoulea pulchra (Gray, 1838); Demoulia pulchra Gray, 1838; Demoulinsia pinguis (A. Adams, 1853); Desmoulea pinguis Adams, 1853; Nassa (Demoulea) pinguis (A. Adams, 1853); Nassa (Demoulea) tryoni Crosse, 1869; Nassa pinguis (A. Adams, 1853); Nassa ponderosa Reeve, 1854

= Demoulia obtusata =

Species of gastropod

Demoulia obtusata, common name : the obtuse demoulia, is a species of sea snail, a marine gastropod mollusk in the family Nassariidae, the Nassa mud snails or dog whelks.

== Description ==
The shell size varies between 17 mm and 25 mm.

== Distribution ==
This species is distributed in European waters and in the Atlantic Ocean off West Africa, Gabon and Senegal.
