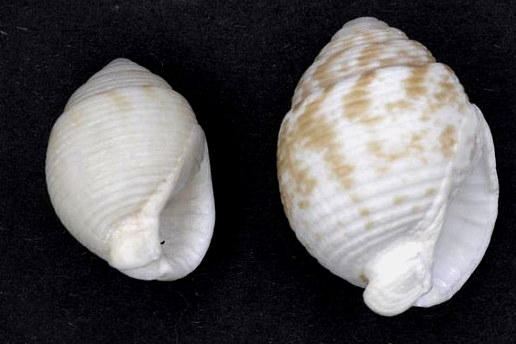
- Two shells of Demoulia abbreviata (museum specimens at Naturalis Biodiversity Center)

Scientific classification
- Kingdom: Animalia
- Phylum: Mollusca
- Class: Gastropoda
- Subclass: Caenogastropoda
- Order: Neogastropoda
- Family: Nassariidae
- Subfamily: Nassariinae
- Genus: Demoulia; Gray, 1838

Type species
- Buccinum retusum Lamarck, 1822

Synonyms
- Demoulea Gray, 1847; Demoulinsia (incorrect subsequent spelling); Desmoulea Gray, 1847; Desmoulinsia Woodward, 1851; Moulinsia Tournouer, 1874 (not available: not used as a valid name); Nassa (Demoulea) [sic] (incorrect subsequent spelling of Demoulia Gray, 1838); Nassa (Demoulia) Gray, 1838; Nassa (Desmoulea) [sic] (incorrect subsequent spelling of Demoulia Gray, 1838); Streptorhega Bronn, 1856

= Demoulia =

Genus of gastropods

Demoulia is a genus of sea snails, marine gastropod mollusks in the family Nassariidae, the Nassa mud snails or dog whelks.

== Description ==
The ovate-globose shell is covered with a downy epidermis. The spire is short, conical with a papillary apex. The whorls are depressed. The aperture is ovate. The inner lip is thickened, with a ridge posteriorly. The outer lip is contracted, thickened externally and plicated internally.

== Species ==
Species within the genus Demoulia include:

- Demoulia abbreviata (Gmelin, 1791)
- † Demoulia conglobata (Brocchi, 1814)
- Demoulia nataliae Kilburn, 1972
- Demoulia obtusata (Link, 1807)
- † Demoulia pupa (Brocchi, 1814)
- Demoulia tryoni (Crosse, 1869)
- Demoulia ventricosa (Lamarck, 1816)
- † Demoulia zbyszewskii Landau, Marques da Silva & Gili, 2009

Species brought into synonymy

- Demoulia kurodai Tomlin, 1932 : synonym of Nassarius sufflatus (Gould, 1860)
- Demoulia pulchra Gray, 1838 : synonym of Demoulia obtusata (Link, 1807)
- Demoulia retusa (Lamarck, 1822): synonym of Demoulia ventricosa (Lamarck, 1816)
