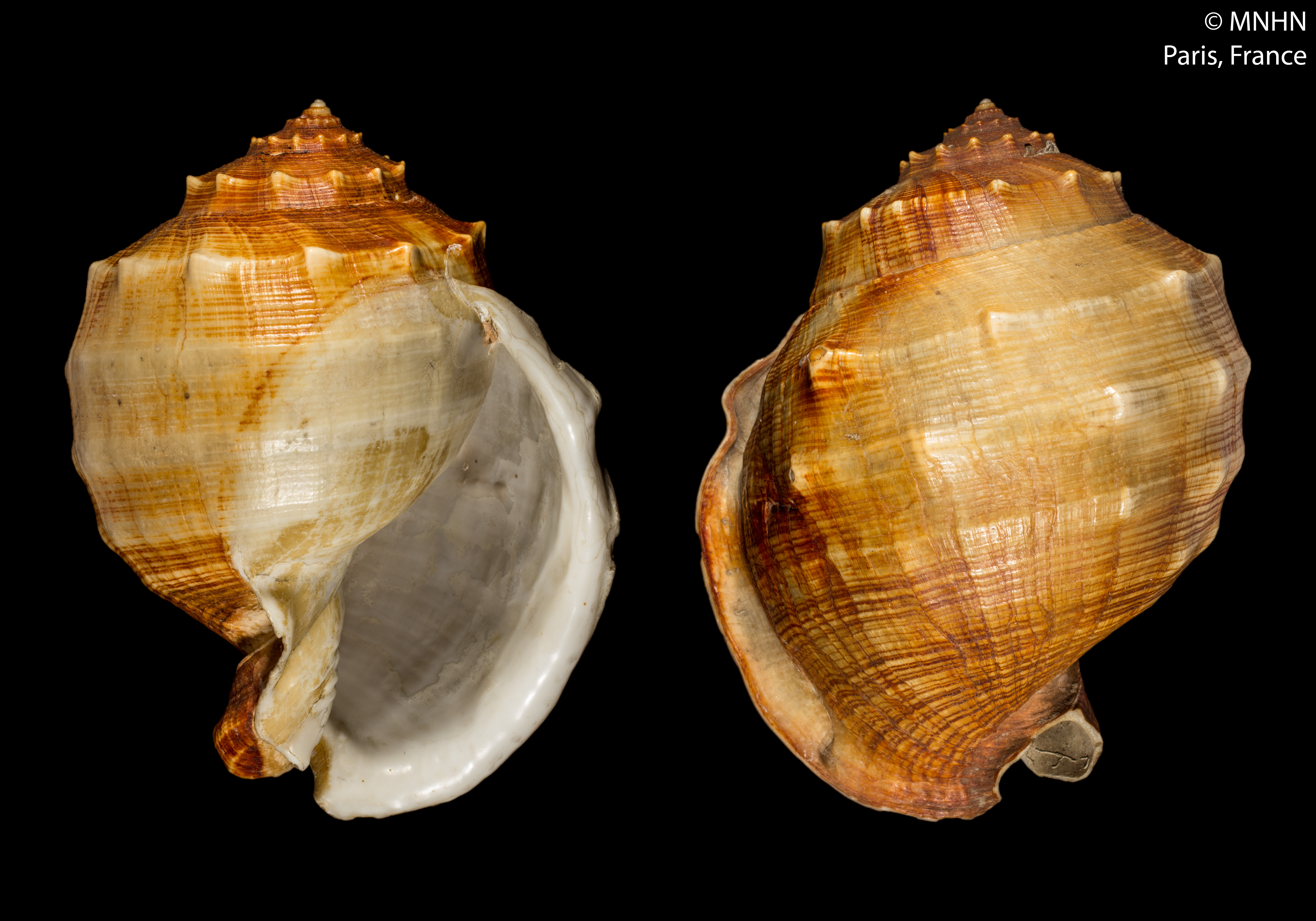
- Shell of Echinophoria coronadoi (holotype at MNHN, Paris)

Scientific classification
- Kingdom: Animalia
- Phylum: Mollusca
- Class: Gastropoda
- Subclass: Caenogastropoda
- Order: Littorinimorpha
- Superfamily: Tonnoidea
- Family: Cassidae
- Genus: Echinophoria; Sacco, 1890

Type species
- † Buccinum intermedium Brocchi, 1814

Synonyms
- Bathygalea Woodring & Olsson, 1957; Bathygalea (Bathygalea) Woodring & Olsson, 1957; Cassis (Echinophoria) Sacco, 1890; Euspinacassis Finlay, 1926; Phalium (Echinophoria) Sacco, 1890; † Trachydolium Howe, 1926

= Echinophoria =

Genus of gastropods

Echinophoria is a genus of large sea snails, marine gastropod mollusks in the family Cassidae, the helmet snails and bonnet snails.

== Species ==
Species within the genus Echinophoria include:

- Echinophoria bituberculosa (Martens, 1901)
- Echinophoria carnosa Kuroda & Habe in Habe, 1961
- Echinophoria coronadoi (Crosse, 1867)
- † Echinophoria emilyae (Laws, 1932) †
- † Echinophoria grangei (Marwick, 1926)
- Echinophoria hadra (Woodring & Olsson, 1957)
- † Echinophoria intermedia (Brocchi, 1814)
- Echinophoria kurodai (Abbott, 1968)
- Echinophoria mozambicana Bozzetti, Rosado & T. Cossignani, 2010
- † Echinophoria oconnori (Dell, 1952)
- † Echinophoria oneroaensis (Powell, 1938)
- Echinophoria pilsbryi (Woodring & Olsson, 1957)
- † Echinophoria pollens (Finlay, 1926)
- † Echinophoria toreuma (Powell, 1928)
- † Echinophoria trituberculata (Weaver, 1912)
- Echinophoria wyvillei Watson, 1886)

Species brought into synonymy:

- Echinophoria oschei Mühlhäusser, 1992: synonym of Echinophoria wyvillei (Watson, 1886)
