= Cassis patamakanthini =

Scientific classification
- Kingdom: Animalia
- Phylum: Mollusca
- Class: Gastropoda
- Subclass: Caenogastropoda
- Order: Littorinimorpha
- Family: Cassidae
- Genus: Cassis
- Species: C. patamakanthini

Binomial name
- Cassis patamakanthini Parth, 2000

Species of gastropod

Cassis patamakanthini is a species of sea snail, a marine gastropod mollusk in the family Cassidae, the helmet snails and bonnet snails.

== Description ==
Maximum length up to 50 mm.

== Distribution ==
Found in Western Indian Ocean off the coast of Tanzania. Also occurs in South-West India and Western Australia.
