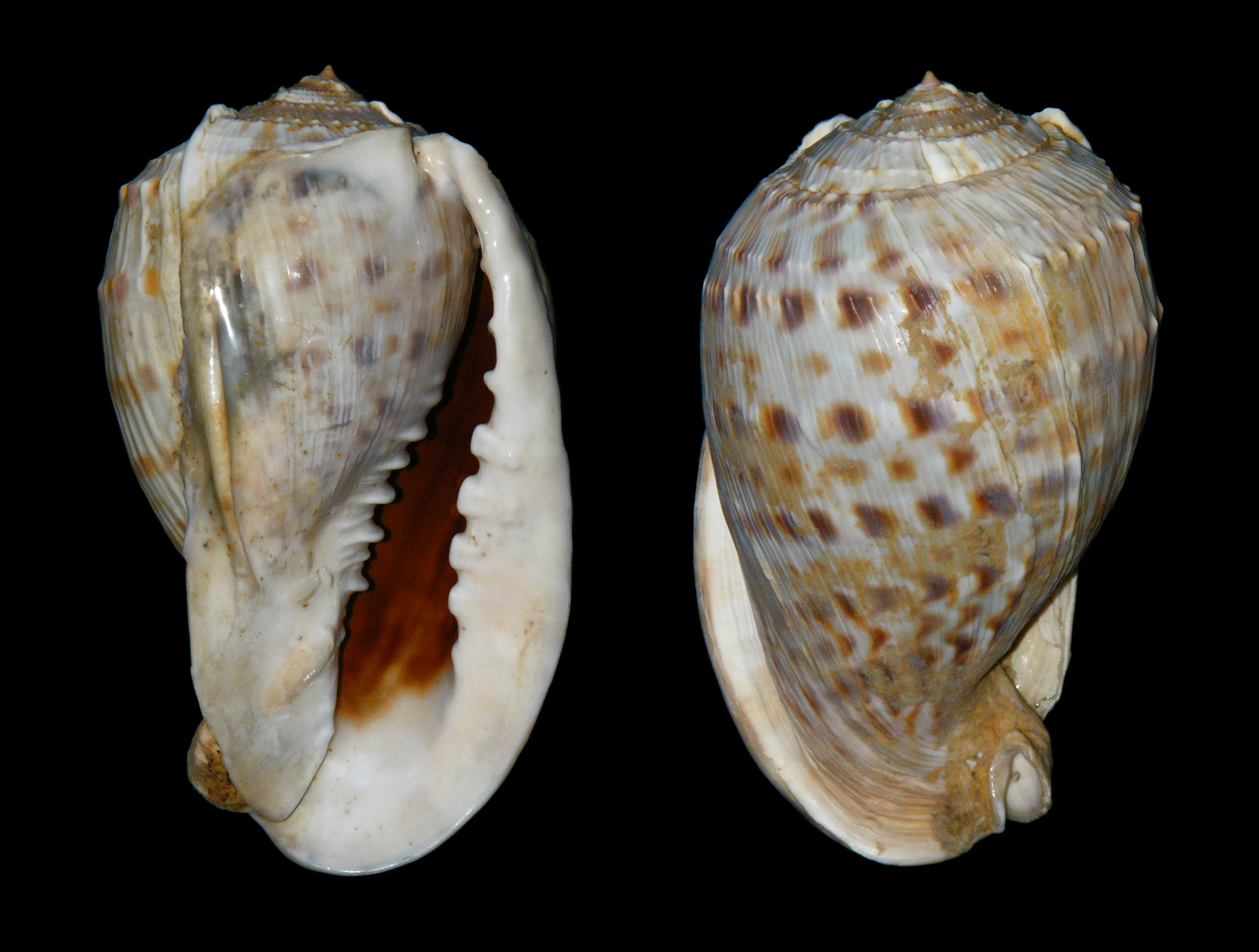

Scientific classification
- Kingdom: Animalia
- Phylum: Mollusca
- Class: Gastropoda
- Subclass: Caenogastropoda
- Order: Littorinimorpha
- Family: Cassidae
- Genus: Cassis
- Species: C. tessellata

Binomial name
- Cassis tessellata Gmelin, 1791

Synonyms
- Buccinum maculosa Gmelin, J.F., 1791; Buccinum rumpfii Gmelin, J.F., 1791; Cassis coronata Röding, P.F., 1798; Cassis fasciata Bruguière, J.G., 1792; Cassis spinosa "Gronovius" Deshayes, G.P., 1844; Cassis spinosa "Meuschen, F.C." Iredale, T., 1927

= Cassis tessellata =

Species of gastropod

Cassis tessellata, common name : the West African helmet, is a species of large sea snail, a marine gastropod mollusk in the family Cassidae, the helmet snails and bonnet snails.

== Description ==
The shell is cone-shaped with a flattened apex, light with darker symmetrical spots. On the outer surface are small short spikes. The siphon (short and narrow) is strongly bent back. From the side of the mouth, the shell is white. The size of an adult shell varies between 66 mm and 300 mm.

== Distribution ==
This species occurs in the Caribbean Sea and in the Atlantic Ocean along Cape Verde and from Senegal to Angola.
