= Cassis kreipli =

Scientific classification
- Kingdom: Animalia
- Phylum: Mollusca
- Class: Gastropoda
- Subclass: Caenogastropoda
- Order: Littorinimorpha
- Family: Cassidae
- Genus: Cassis
- Species: C. kreipli

Binomial name
- Cassis kreipli Morrison, 2003

Species of gastropod

Cassis kreipli is a species of sea snail, a marine gastropod mollusk in the family Cassidae, the helmet snails and bonnet snails.
