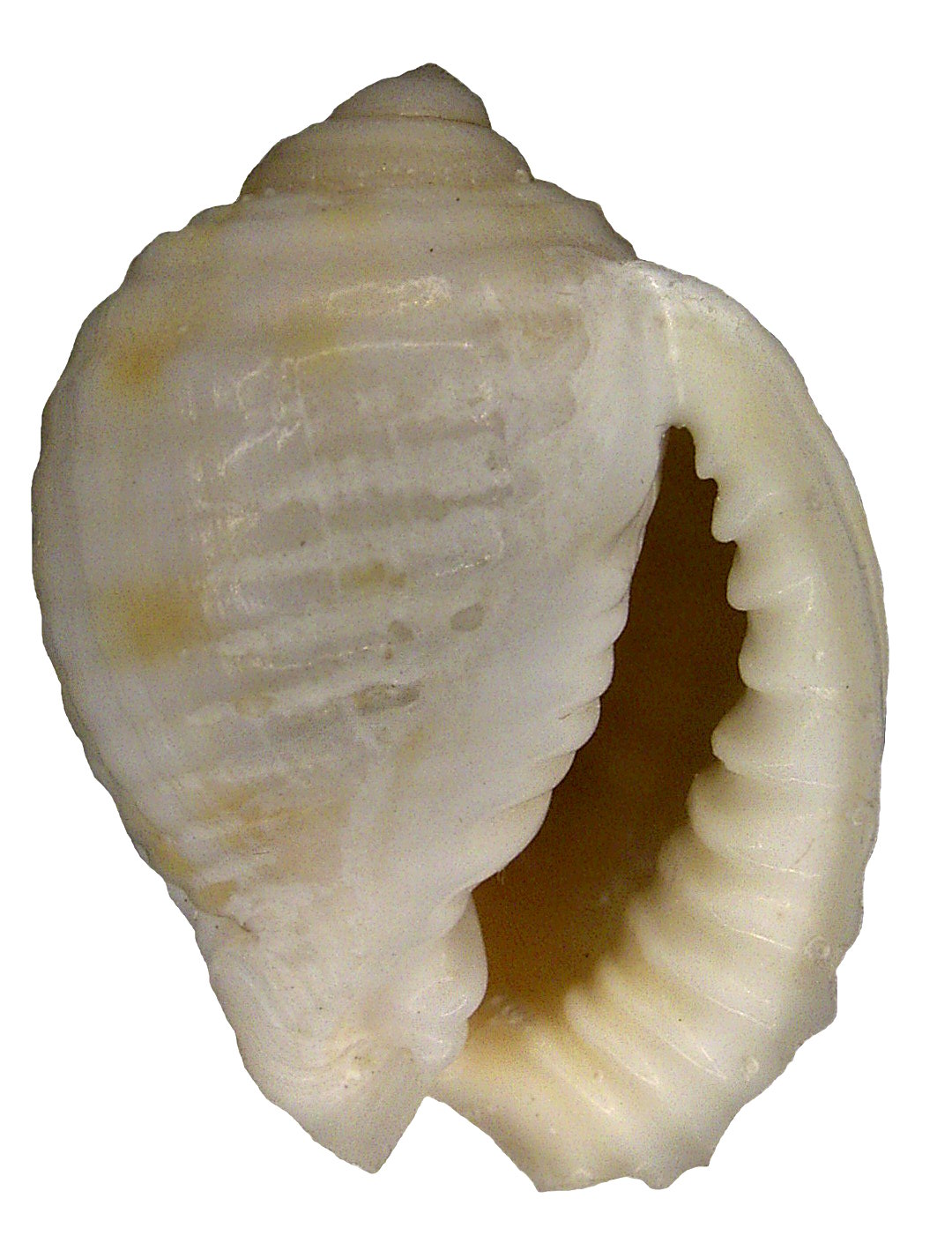
- Apertural view of a shell of Malea pomum

Scientific classification
- Kingdom: Animalia
- Phylum: Mollusca
- Class: Gastropoda
- Subclass: Caenogastropoda
- Order: Littorinimorpha
- Superfamily: Tonnoidea
- Family: Tonnidae
- Genus: Malea; Valenciennes, 1832

Type species
- Malea latilabris Valenciennes, 1832

Synonyms
- Dolium (Cadium) Link, 1807 (Recombination of synonym); Dolium (Malea) Valenciennes, 1832 (Recombination); Malea (Malea) Valenciennes, 1832 (Recombination as subgenus); Malea (Quimalea) Iredale, 1929 (Recombination); Quimalea Iredale, 1929; Tonna (Malea) Valenciennes, 1832 (Recombination)

= Malea (gastropod) =

Genus of gastropods

Malea is a genus of large sea snails, marine gastropod mollusks in the family Tonnidae, the tun shells.

== Species ==
Species within the genus Malea include:

- † Malea densecostata (Rutsch, 1934)
- † Malea hyaducki Petuch & Berschauer, 2021
- † Malea orbiculata (Brocchi, 1814)
- † Malea papuana (Beets, 1943)
- † Malea petiti Petuch, 1989
- Malea pomum (Linnaeus, 1758)
- Malea ringens (Swainson, 1822)
- † Malea springi Petuch, 1989

Species brought into synonymy

- Malea crassilabris Valenciennes, 1832: synonym of Malea ringens (Swainson, 1822)
- Malea crassilabrumValenciennes, 1832 synonym of Malea ringens (Swainson, 1822)
- Malea dentatum (Barnes, 1824): synonym of Malea ringens (Swainson, 1822)
- Malea latilabris Valenciennes, 1832: synonym of Malea ringens (Swainson, 1822)
- Malea noronhensis Kempf & Matthews, 1969: synonym of Malea pomum (Linnaeus, 1758)
- Malea pommum (Linnaeus, 1758): synonym of Malea pomum (Linnaeus, 1758)

== Distribution ==
This marine genus of cone snails occurs in the Red Sea, the tropical Indo-West Pacific; off the Philippines and Australia (the Northern Territory, Queensland and Western Australia).
