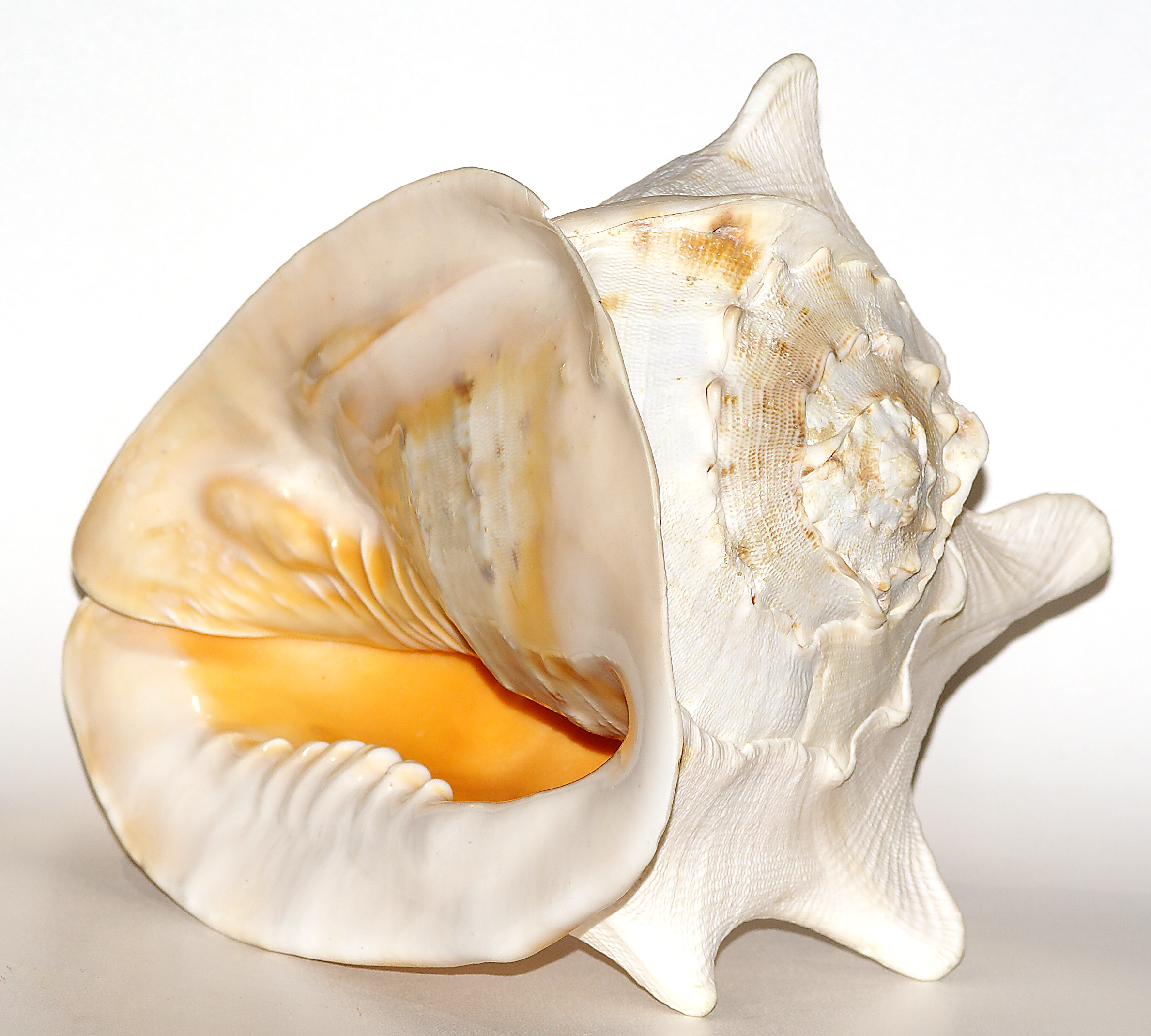
- A shell of Cassis cornuta
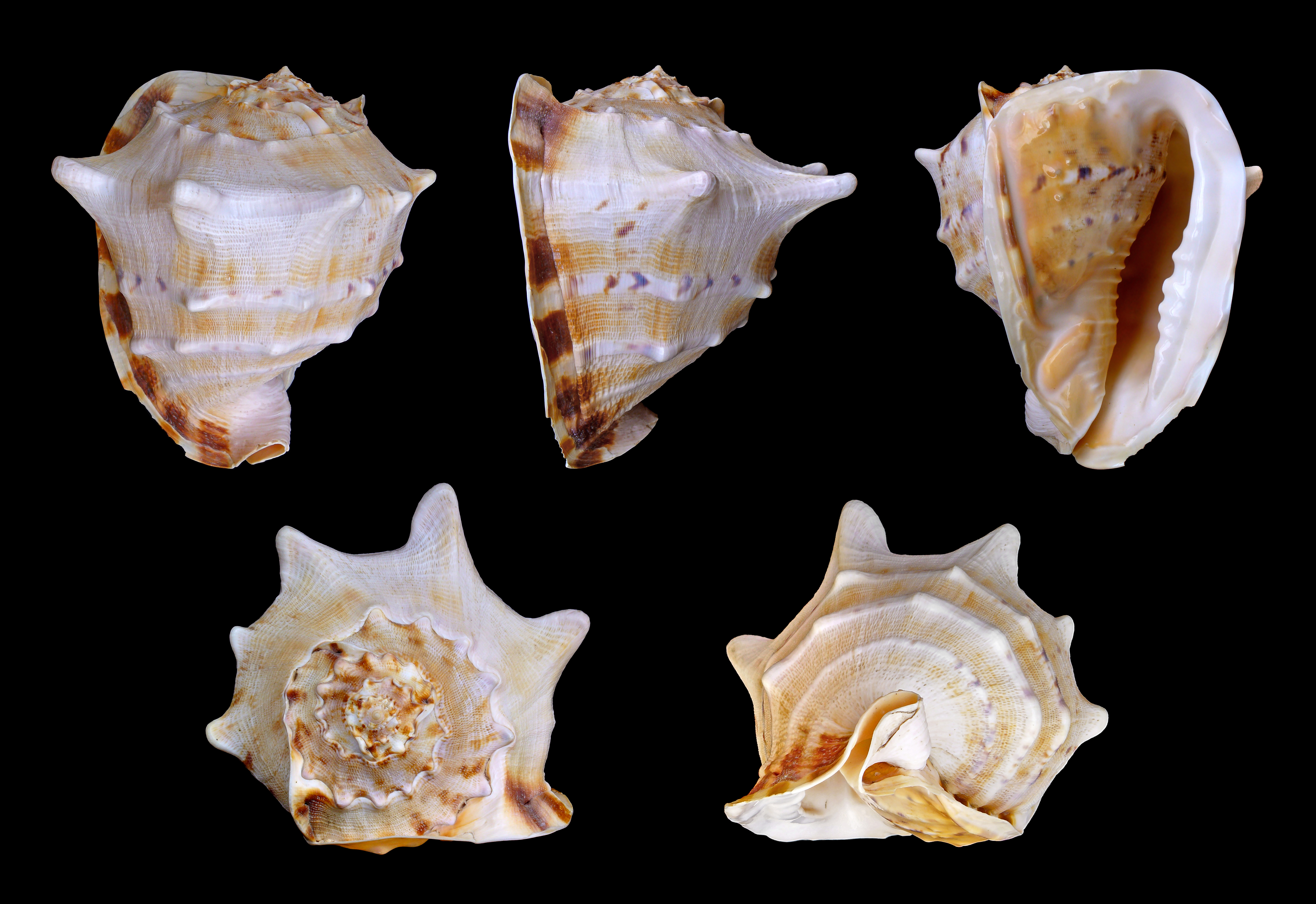
- Five views of a shell of Cassis cornuta

Scientific classification
- Kingdom: Animalia
- Phylum: Mollusca
- Class: Gastropoda
- Subclass: Caenogastropoda
- Order: Littorinimorpha
- Family: Cassidae
- Genus: Cassis
- Species: C. cornuta

Binomial name
- Cassis cornuta (Linnaeus, 1758)

Synonyms
- Buccinum cornutum Linnaeus, 1758 (basionym); Cassis amboinensis Petivier in Tryon, G.W., 1885; Cassis brevirostrum Petivier in Tryon, G.W., 1885; Cassis caputequinum Röding, 1798; Cassis hamata Röding, 1798; Cassis labiata Dillwyn, L.W., 1817

= Cassis cornuta =

Species of gastropod

Cassis cornuta, common name the horned helmet, is a species of extremely large sea snail, a marine gastropod mollusc in the family Cassidae, the helmet shells and their allies.

== Description ==
The length of the shell varies between 50 mm and 410 mm. It is the largest of all helmet shells. It has a very solid, heavy, rotund shell with large, horn-like knobs and a wide, flat base. The shell has a dorsally pale orange colour, its base vivid orange, faintly marked with white and brown.

== Habitat ==
This large sea snail is found on sand and coral rubble, often around reefs.

== Distribution ==
This species occurs in the Red Sea, the Indian Ocean, off the southern African coast from northern KwaZulu-Natal and from Mozambique, as well as in the Pacific Ocean.

== Relevance to humans ==
The shell of Cassis cornuta is a very popular collector's item. In some places the snail is hunted for meat and is traditionally roasted in the shell over fire. Because of both of these factors, humans are a major enemy, and the species is now at risk in many places. However, worldwide it is not listed in the Red List. Because this snail hunts the crown-of-thorns starfish, which feed on corals, Cassis cornuta has been put under strict protection in Queensland.
