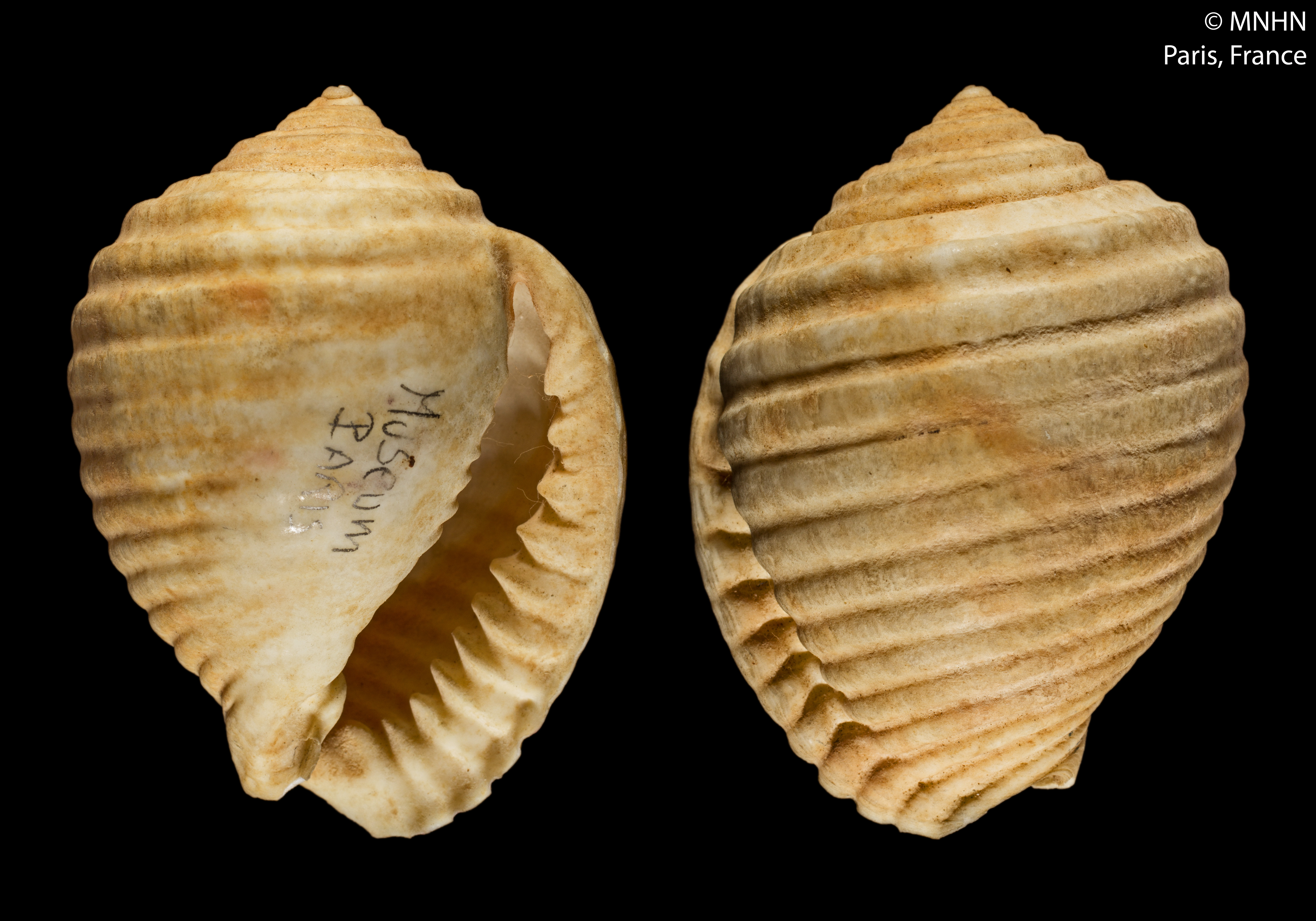
- Malea pomum shell (paratype at MNHN, Paris)

Scientific classification
- Kingdom: Animalia
- Phylum: Mollusca
- Class: Gastropoda
- Subclass: Caenogastropoda
- Order: Littorinimorpha
- Family: Tonnidae
- Genus: Malea
- Species: M. pomum

Binomial name
- Malea pomum (Linnaeus, 1758)

Synonyms
- Buccinum pomum Linnaeus, 1758; Cadium pomum (Linnaeus, 1758) (Recombined); Cadus pomum Röding, 1798; Cassis labrosa Martini, 1773; Dolium (Cadium) pomum (Linnaeus, 1758) (Recombined); Dolium (Cadium) pomum var. macgregori (Iredale, 1931) (Recombination of synonym); Dolium (Malea) pomum (Linnaeus, 1758) (Recombined); Dolium pomum Lamarck, 1822; Malea (Quimalea) pomum (Linnaeus, 1758) (Recombination); Malea noronhensis Kempf & Matthews, 1969; Malea pommum (Linnaeus, 1758); Malea pomum noronhensis Kempf & Matthews, 1969; Quimalea pomum (Linnaeus, 1758); Quimalea pomum macgregori Iredale, 1931; Quimalea pomum var. mcgregori Iredale, 1931; Tonna (Malea) pomum (Linnaeus, 1758) (Recombination); Tonna (Malea) pomum macgregori (Iredale, 1931) (Recombination of synonym); Tonna (Malea) pomum pomum (Linnaeus, 1758) (Recombination)

= Malea pomum =

Pacific grinning tun

Species of gastropod

Malea pomum, common name the Pacific grinning tun, is a species of large sea snail, a marine gastropod mollusk in the family Tonnidae, the tun shells.

== Description ==
The size of the shell varies between 40 mm and 90 mm.

The somewhat thick shell is ovate and inflated. It has a whitish ground color, varied and spotted with square spots, of a yellow more or less reddish, alternating upon the transverse ribs, with other spots of a dull white. The short spire is composed of six convex whorls, slightly flattened above, banded with ribs equally convex, wide, not distant, and divided by narrow, shallow furrows. The aperture is somewhat narrow, toothed upon both edges, colored yellow within. The outer lip is dilated, particularly towards the base, and forms externally a very thick convex margin, the external part of which is sharp, undulated, and its internal surface furnished with ten or twelve transverse, distant teeth, resembling folds. The inner lip consists of a smooth plate, convex and white, which partially covers the body of the shell. The columella presents a pretty deep emargination, above which are observed several transverse thick folds, and some others, less numerous, more oblique, and less distinctly marked.

The color of the animal is of a beautiful white, marked upon its circumference with triangular flames of a violet brown. The tentacles are long, slender and pointed, spotted with brown, in the form of triple rings. The trunk is white, the tube very long, pointed with brown and violet at its extremity.

== Distribution ==
This marine species occurs in the Red Sea, the tropical Indo-West Pacific, the Philippines; off Tanzania, Madagascar, Mauritius, Mascarenes, Houtman Abrolhos, China; off Australia (the Northern Territory, Queensland and Western Australia).
