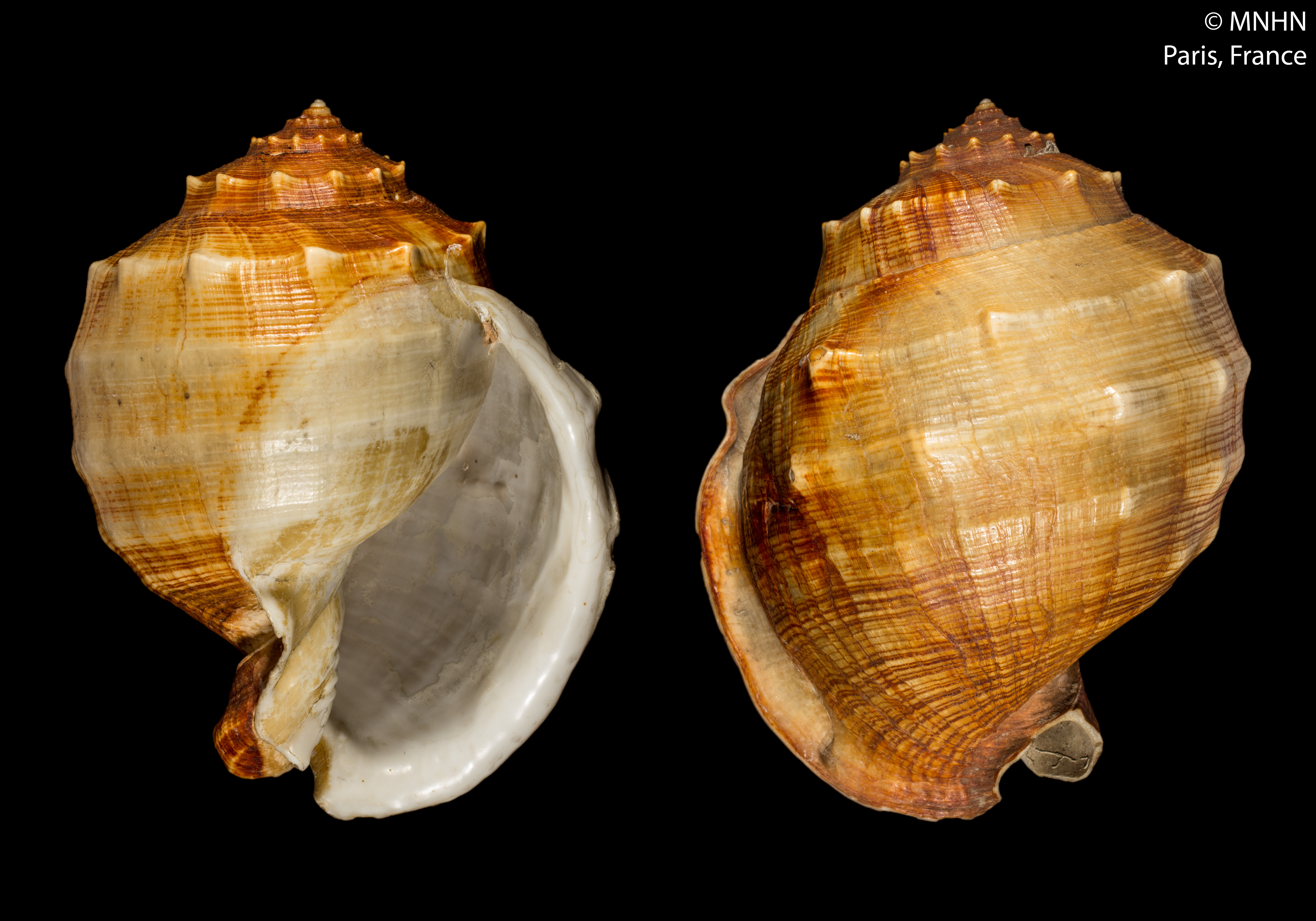

Scientific classification
- Kingdom: Animalia
- Phylum: Mollusca
- Class: Gastropoda
- Subclass: Caenogastropoda
- Order: Littorinimorpha
- Family: Cassidae
- Genus: Echinophoria
- Species: E. coronadoi

Binomial name
- Echinophoria coronadoi (Crosse, 1867)

Synonyms
- Cassis coronadoi Crosse, 1867 (basionym)

= Echinophoria coronadoi =

Species of gastropod

Echinophoria coronadoi is a species of large sea snail, a marine gastropod mollusk in the family Cassidae, the helmet snails and bonnet snails.

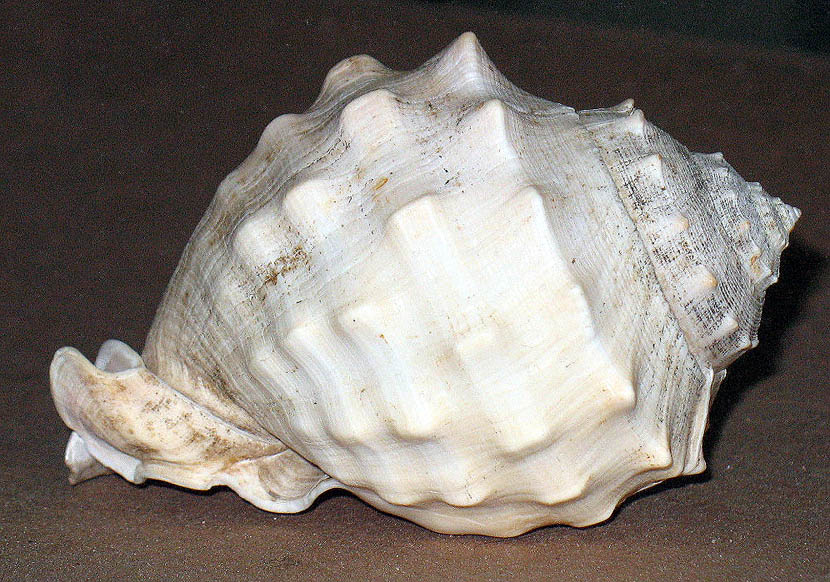
Crabbed shell from continental shelf, Trinidad Island, West Indies.

== Distribution ==
This species occurs in the Caribbean Sea and the Gulf of Mexico. On the continental shelf near Trinidad Isl., crabbed shells of this sp. are sometimes caught in fish traps at 100 m. depth.

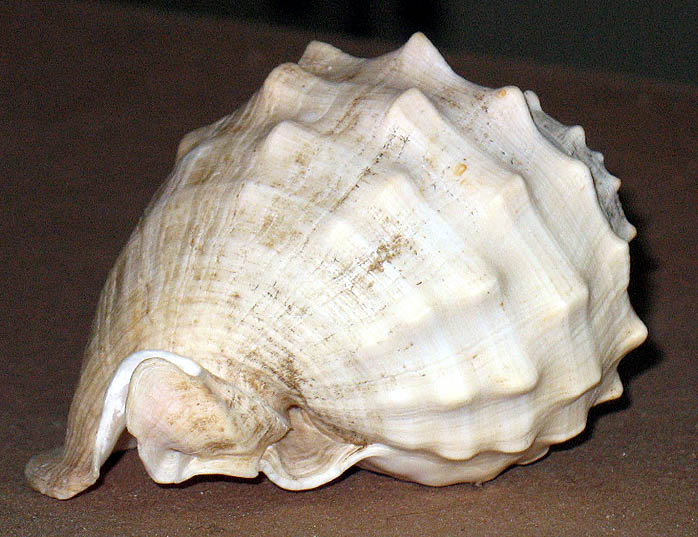
Crabbed shell from continental shelf, Trinidad Island, West Indies.

== Description ==
The maximum recorded shell length is 120.8 mm.

== Habitat ==
Minimum recorded depth is 33 m. Maximum recorded depth is 275 m.
