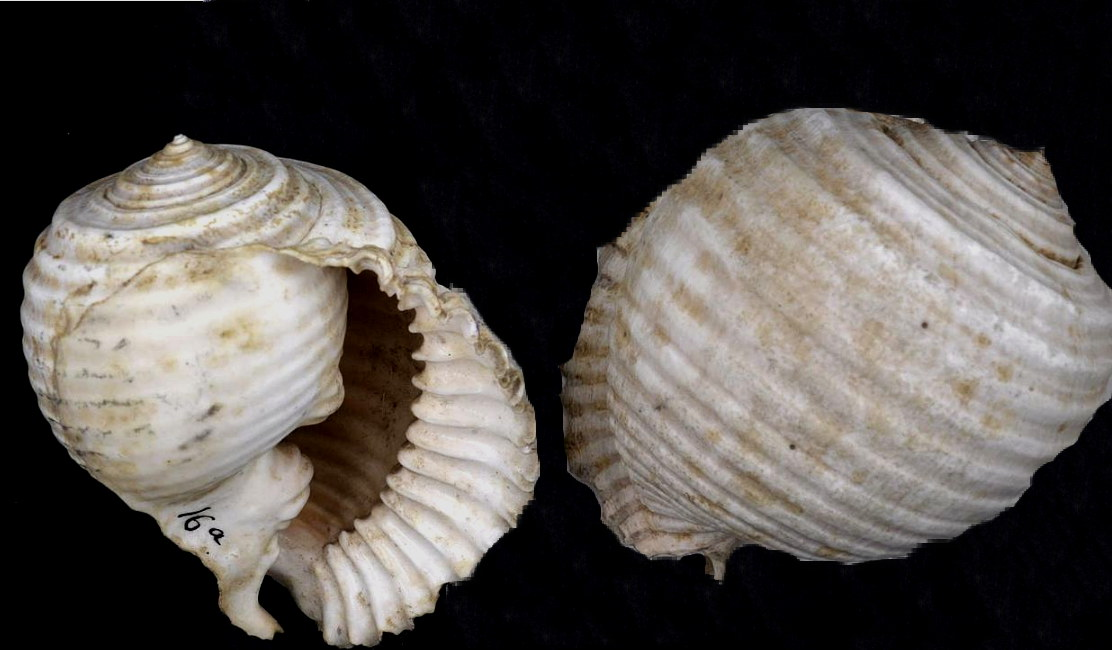
- Two views of a shell of Malea ringens (museum specimens at Naturalis Biodiversity Center)

Scientific classification
- Kingdom: Animalia
- Phylum: Mollusca
- Class: Gastropoda
- Subclass: Caenogastropoda
- Order: Littorinimorpha
- Family: Tonnidae
- Genus: Malea
- Species: M. ringens

Binomial name
- Malea ringens (Swainson, 1822)

Synonyms
- synonymy: Buccinum ringens (Swainson, 1822); Cassis ringens Swainson, 1822; Dolium (Cadium) dentatum Barnes, 1824; Dolium (Cadium) dentatum var. crassilabris (Valenciennes, 1832) (Recombination of synonym); Dolium (Malea) ringens (Swainson, 1822) (Recombination); Dolium crassilabre Menke, 1850; Dolium dentatum Barnes, 1824; Dolium latilabre Kiener, 1835; Dolium personatum Menke, 1828; Dolium plicatum Deshayes in Milne-Edwards, 1843; Dolium plicosum Menke, 1828; Dolium ringens (Swainson, 1822) (Recombination); Malea crassilabris Valenciennes, 1832; Malea crassilabrum Sowerby, 1842 (Spelling mistake); Malea latilabris Valenciennes, 1832; Tonna (Malea) ringens (Swainson, 1822) (Recombination)

= Malea ringens =

Grinning tun

Species of gastropod

Malea ringens, common name the grinning tun, is a species of large sea snail, a marine gastropod mollusk in the family Tonnidae, the tun shells.

== Distribution ==
This species occurs in the Pacific Ocean from Mexico to Peru and off Galapagos Islands.

== Description ==
The size of the shell of Malea ringens varies between 60 mm and 270 mm, with an average diameter of about 100 mm. It is one of the largest of Panamic shells. These shells are basically white and delicately spotted with yellow under the thin periostracum.

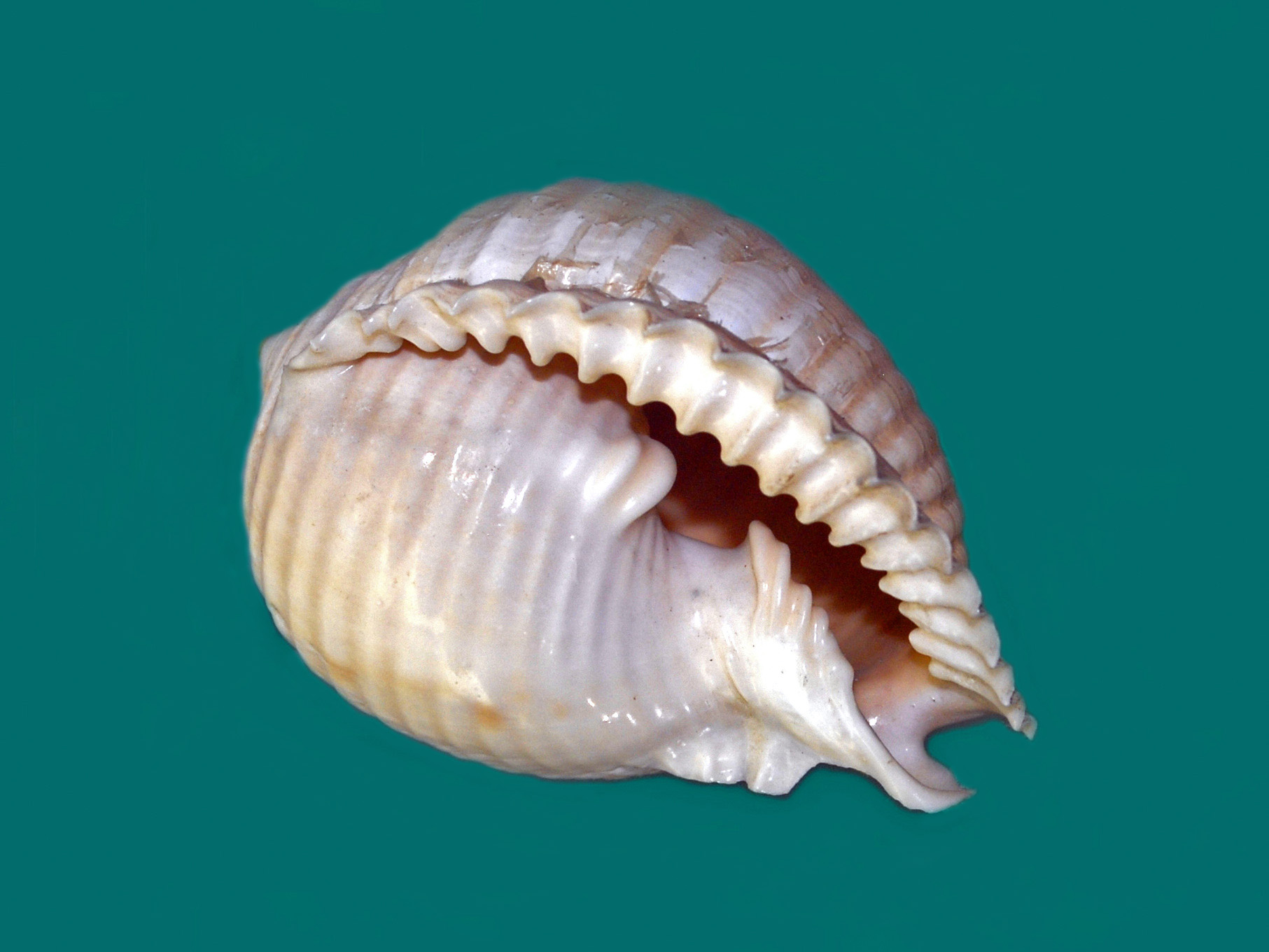
A shell of Malea ringens. Museum specimen

The pretty thick shell is ovate-globose and ventricose. The pointed spire is formed of six whorls, the upper of which are slightly convex, but little developed, having three or four transverse striae, very apparent, and spotted with brown blotches. The body whorl is very much inflated, completely surrounded by from fifteen to twenty equal ribs, depressed, but slightly rounded. These ribs are separated from each other by a shallow furrow, which becomes wider between the first two or three upper ribs, by the disappearance of the intermediate ribs. The longitudinal striae of growth are numerous, very fine, and slightly apparent.

The aperture is narrow, for it is much contracted by two protuberances situated upon the two lower thirds of the columella. The outer lip is arched, flattened, widened within, having a wide longitudinal ridge outside of it. It has, on the inside, the whole length, from sixteen to eighteen ridges, or very strongly prominent teeth. The edge is undulated and denticulated. The inner lip is thin, diaphanous, spreading upon the body of the shell, to which it adheres, except towards the base, where it becomes free and thicker. The columella is twisted, and presents a very deep emargination, above which is seen a wide, thick, furrowed tubercle, which appears as if suspended over this hollow. Another tubercle projects near the base, separated from the first by the cavity just spoken of. It is furnished with wrinkles and numerous furrows of a brilliant white, which imperceptibly diminish in size at the base, and above the emargination, which is turned out like a gutter, and perfectly smooth. The color of this shell is whitish, slightly blended with a dull yellow. The interior is red. The periostracum is thin and yellowish.
