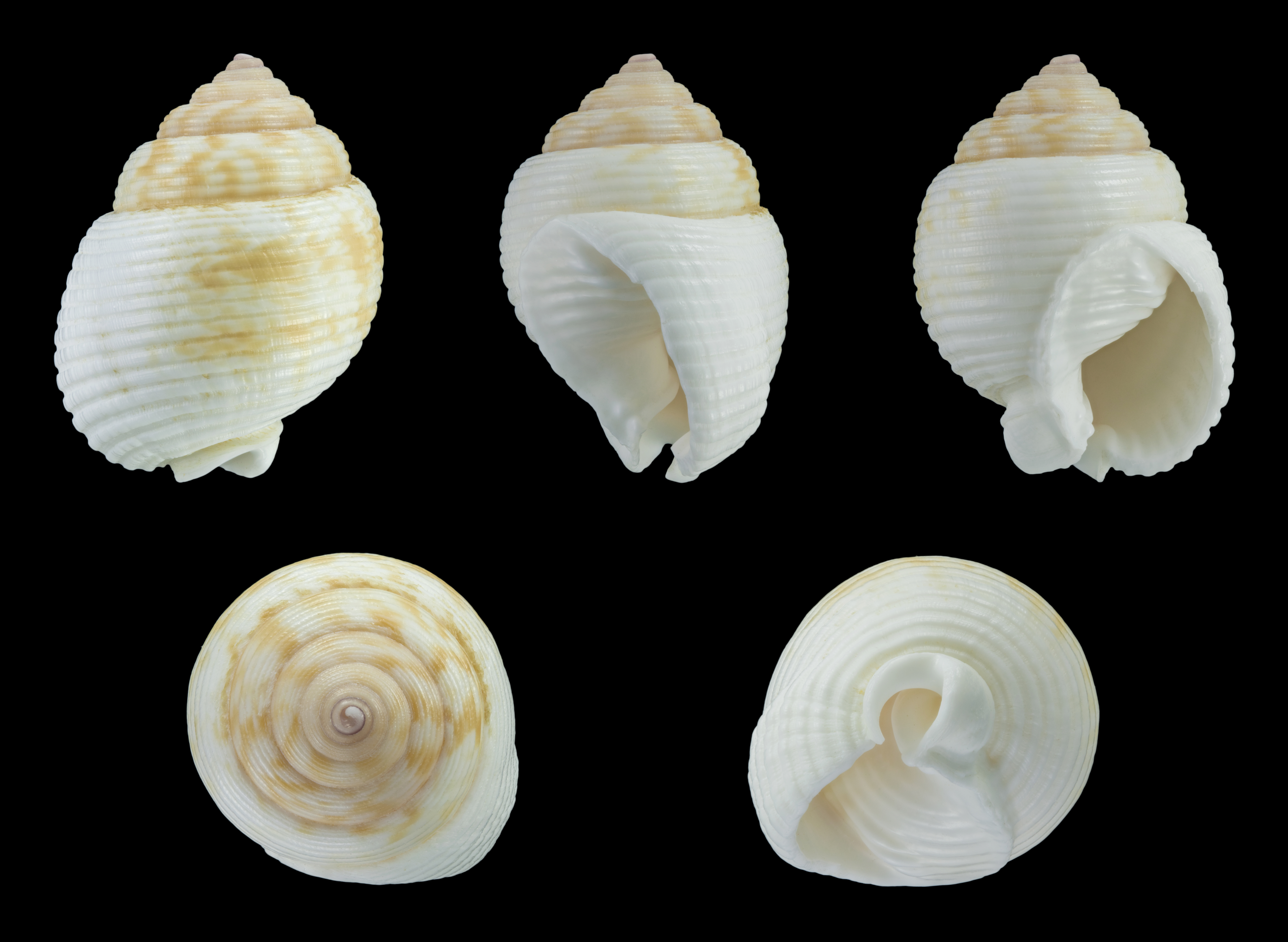

Scientific classification
- Kingdom: Animalia
- Phylum: Mollusca
- Class: Gastropoda
- Subclass: Caenogastropoda
- Order: Neogastropoda
- Family: Nassariidae
- Genus: Demoulia
- Species: D. abbreviata

Binomial name
- Demoulia abbreviata (Gmelin, 1791)

Synonyms
- Buccinum abbreviatum Gmelin, 1791 (original combination); Buccinum cassideum G.B. Sowerby I, 1825; Cassis glans Röding, 1798; Nassa (Demoulea) abbreviata (Gmelin, 1791); Nassa (Demoulia) abbreviata (Gmelin, 1791); Nassa globosa G.B. Sowerby I, 1825

= Demoulia abbreviata =

Species of gastropod

Demoulia abbreviata, common name : the obtuse demoulia, is a species of sea snail, a marine gastropod mollusk in the family Nassariidae, the Nassa mud snails or dog whelks.

== Description ==
The shell size varies between 20 mm and 36 mm. The ovate, ventricose shell is of a whitish or chestnut color, marked sometimes with deeper spots. The suture is deep and canaliculated, the exterior edge of which is slightly rounded and surrounded by a white band, alternated with fawn-colored blotches. The scaffolded spire is formed of six or seven nearly flat whorls. The body whorl, on the contrary, is very convex, and larger than all the others united. Upon the surface of this shell, are seen equal, raised striae. The white aperture is subrotund, narrowed at the upper part and dilated inferiorly. The thin outer lip is crenulated upon the edge, and marked interiorly with very prominent transverse striae . The columella is arcuated and covered by the inner lip, which is obliterated, flattened and corrugated above. It forms, from the middle to the base, a thick and projecting callus, which is terminated by a very apparent fold, and by two guttules.

== Distribution ==
This marine species occurs off Saldanha Bay, South Transkei, Rep. South Africa. Sometimes is trawled 85 metres depth.
