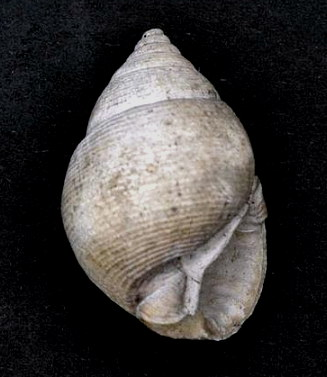
- Apertural view of a shell of Demoulia ventricosa (museum specimen at Naturalis Biodiversity Center)

Scientific classification
- Kingdom: Animalia
- Phylum: Mollusca
- Class: Gastropoda
- Subclass: Caenogastropoda
- Order: Neogastropoda
- Family: Nassariidae
- Genus: Demoulia
- Species: D. ventricosa

Binomial name
- Demoulia ventricosa (Lamarck, 1816)

Synonyms
- Buccinum retusum Lamarck, 1822; Cassis globulus Menke, 1829; Demoulia retusa (Lamarck, 1822); Demoulia ventricosa ventricosa (Lamarck, 1816) · accepted, alternate representation; Nassa obtusa Marrat, 1880; Nassa retusa (Lamarck, 1822); Nassa ventricosa Lamarck, 1816 (original combination)

= Demoulia ventricosa =

Species of gastropod

Demoulia ventricosa, common name : the blunt demoulia, is a species of sea snail, a marine gastropod mollusk in the family Nassariidae, the Nassa mud snails or dog whelks.

There is one subspecies: Demoulia ventricosa nataliae Kilburn, 1972

== Description ==
The shell size varies between 17 mm and 27 mm. The ovate shell is slightly cylindrical and is blunted at its summit. The short spire is flattened. It is composed of five whorls. The two last whorls are much more swollen, and covered upon their whole surface with very fine and very close transverse striae. The suture is very apparent, and a little canaliculated. The white aperture is ovate, narrowed at its upper part and dilated inferiorly. The outer lip is thin and is ornamented interiorly with numerous transverse striae. The smooth columella is arcuated at its base and is covered throughout its whole length with the inner lip, the base of which is a little thicker. The surface of this shell is reddish or violet-colored, with wide, reddish spots. It is ornamented at the upper part of the whorls, and along the suture, with a white band, alternating with irregular deeper spots.

== Distribution ==
This marine species occurs off False Bay, South Africa, and Mozambique.
