= O. grandis =

O. grandis may refer to:

- Ocepeia grandis, an extinct Afrotherian mammal from the Paleocene epoch of Morocco
- Ocyale grandis, a wolf spider species in the genus Ocyale found in Togo, Congo and Namibia
- Oenothera grandis, a herbaceous flowering plant species in the genus Oenothera
- Oldenburgia grandis, a small gnarled tree species found in South Africa
- Onobrychis grandis, a Eurasian perennial herb species in the genus Onobrychis
- Oocorys grandis, a large sea snail species
- Opesia grandis, a fly species in the genus Opesia
- Ophiacodon grandis, an extinct large pelycosaur species found in Joggins, Nova Scotia, Canada and that lived in the early Permian
- Orthogeomys grandis, the giant pocket gopher, a rodent species found in Guatemala, Honduras and Mexico
- Oudenodon grandis, an extinct dicynodont species common throughout southern Africa during the Late Permian

== See also ==
- Grandis (disambiguation)
