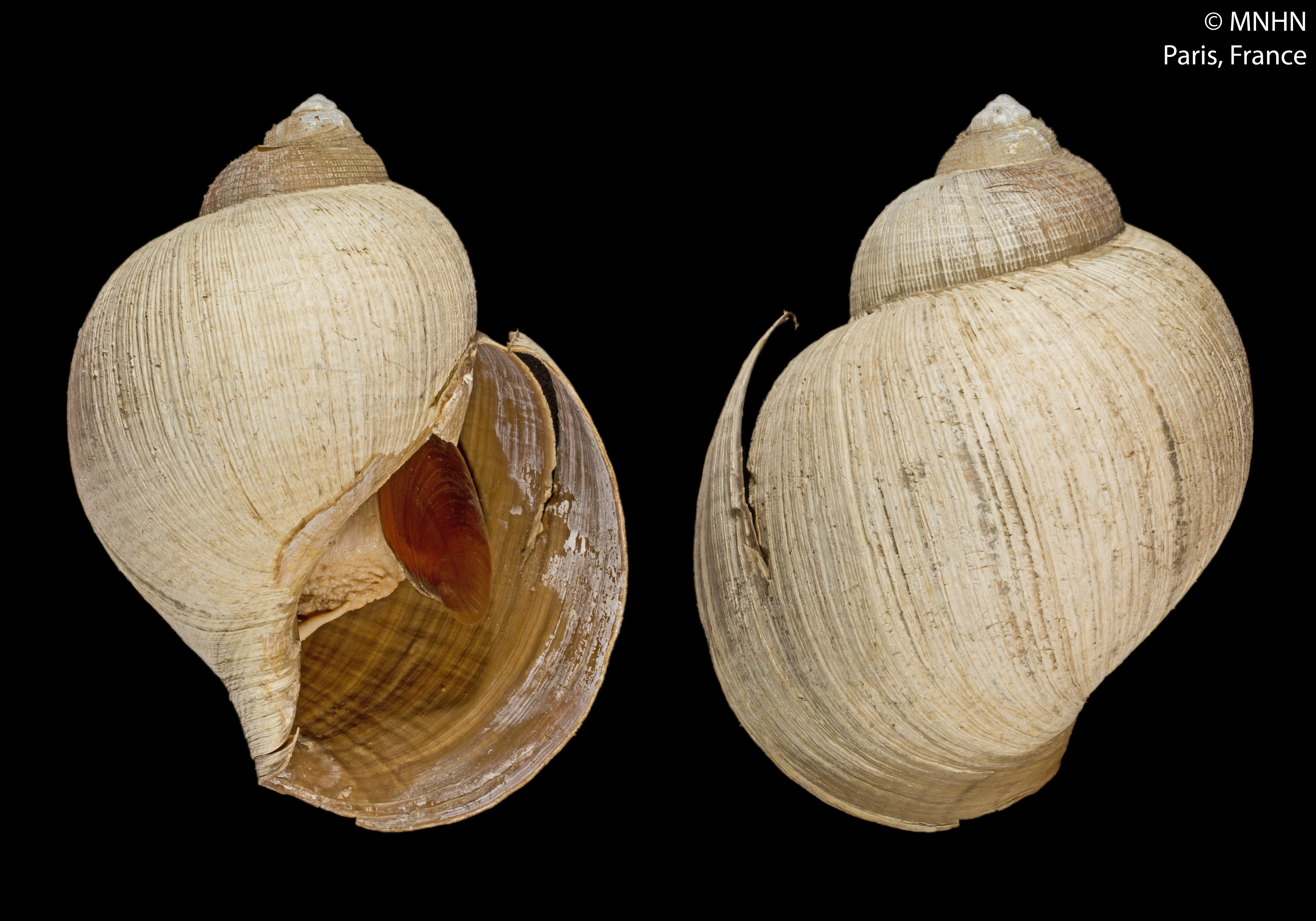
- Shell of Oocorys grandis (holotype at MNHN, Paris)

Scientific classification
- Kingdom: Animalia
- Phylum: Mollusca
- Class: Gastropoda
- Subclass: Caenogastropoda
- Order: Littorinimorpha
- Superfamily: Tonnoidea
- Family: Cassidae
- Genus: Oocorys; Fischer, 1883

Type species
- Oocorys sulcata P. Fischer, 1884

Synonyms
- Benthodolium Verrill & S. Smith [in Verrill], 1884; Hadroocorys Quinn, 1980

= Oocorys =

Genus of gastropods

Oocorys is a genus of large, deepwater sea snails, marine gastropod mollusk in the family Cassidae, the helmet snails and bonnet snails.

== Species ==
Species within the genus Oocorys include:

- Oocorys clericus Quinn, 1980
- Oocorys elevata Dall, 1908
- Oocorys grandis Beu, 2008
- Oocorys sulcata P. Fischer, 1884
- Oocorys verrillii (Dall, 1889)

Species brought into synonymy

- Oocorys barbouri Clench & Aguayo, 1939: synonym of Eucorys barbouri (Clench & Aguayo, 1939) (original combination)
- Oocorys bartschi Rehder, 1943: synonym of Eucorys bartschi (Rehder, 1943) (original combination)
- Oocorys morrisoni Kreipl & Alf, 2001: synonym of Oocorys verrillii (Dall, 1889)
