= Glabrousness =

Lack of hair or fur

Glabrousness (from Latin glaber 'bald, hairless, shaved, smooth, etc.') is the technical term for a lack of hair, down, setae, trichomes, or other such covering. A glabrous surface may be a natural characteristic of all or part of a plant or animal, or be due to loss because of a physical condition, such as alopecia universalis in humans, which causes hair to fall out or not regrow.

== In botany ==
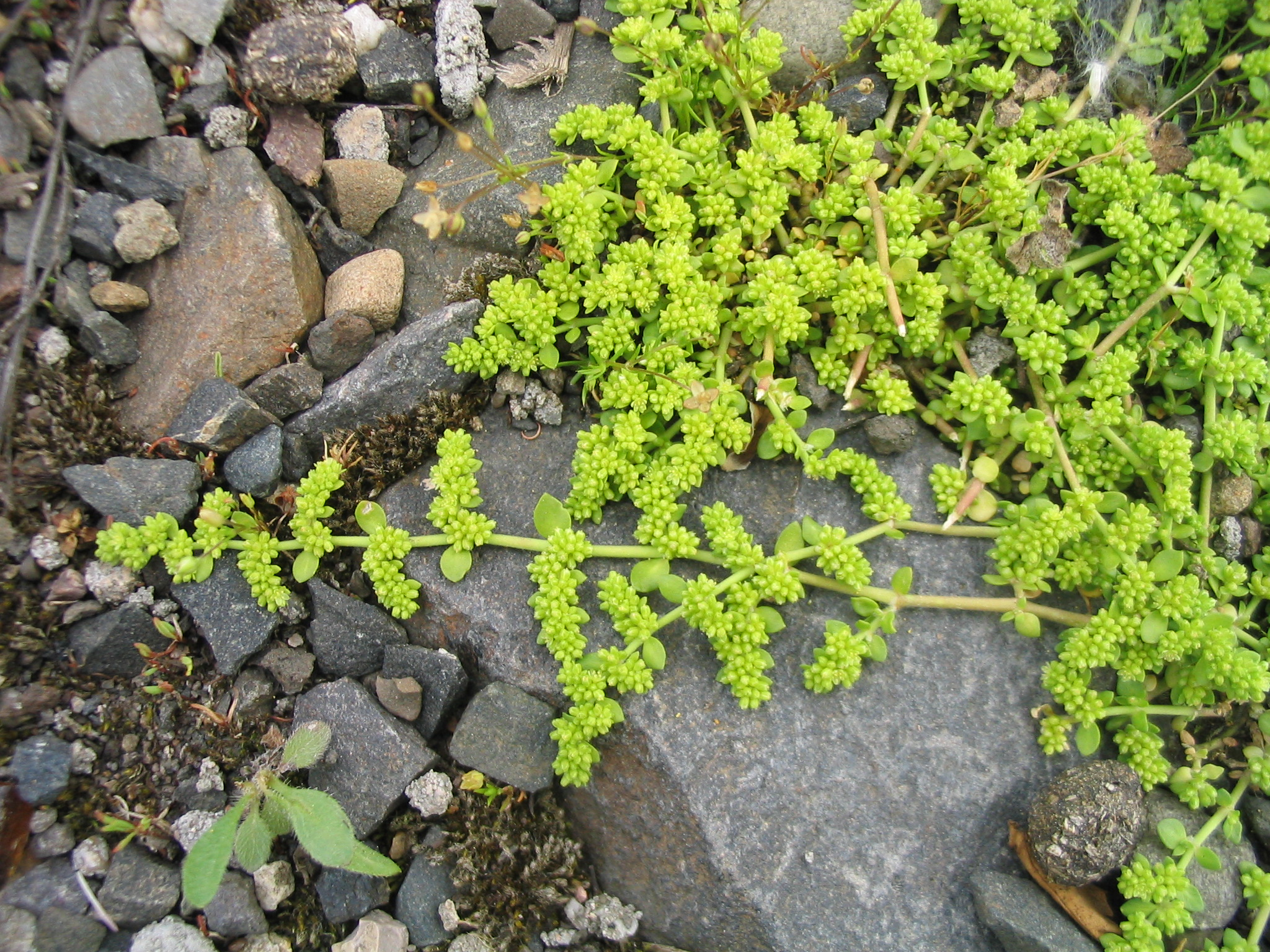
Smooth rupturewort (Herniaria glabra) - a creeping plant with glabrous leaves and stems

Glabrousness or otherwise, of leaves, stems, and fruit is a feature commonly mentioned in plant keys; in botany and mycology, a glabrous morphological feature is one that is smooth and may be glossy. It has no bristles or hair-like structures such as trichomes. In anything like the zoological sense, no plants or fungi have hair or wool, although some structures may resemble such materials.

The term "glabrous" strictly applies only to features that lack trichomes at all times. When an organ bears trichomes at first, but loses them with age, the term used is glabrescent.

In the model plant Arabidopsis thaliana, trichome formation is initiated by the GLABROUS1 protein. Knockouts of the corresponding gene lead to glabrous plants. This phenotype has already been used in gene editing experiments and might be of interest as a visual marker for plant research to improve gene editing methods such as CRISPR/Cas9.

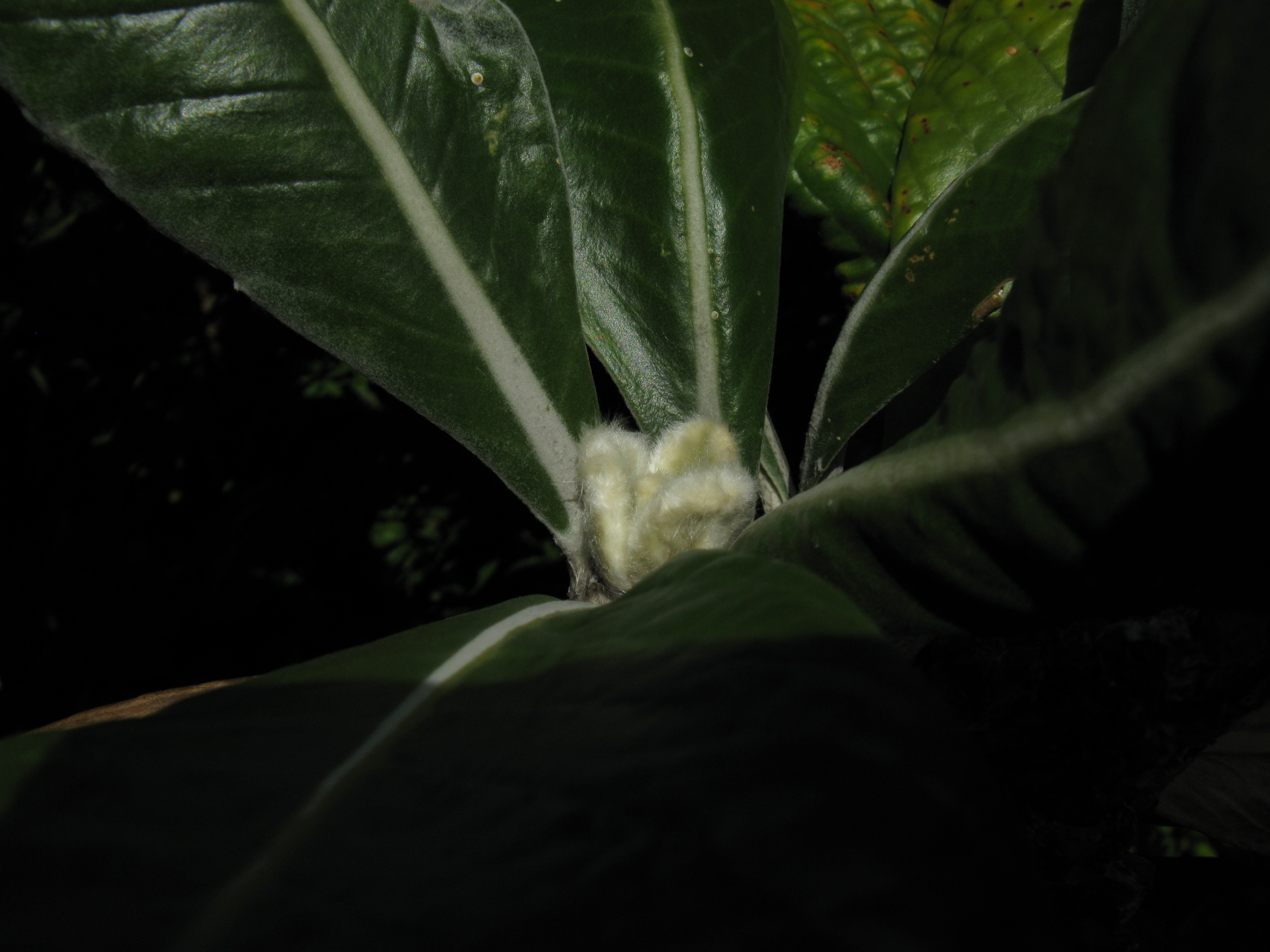
Leaves emerging from buds of Oldenburgia grandis are densely tomentose with a dense indumentum, but their upper surface is glabrescent; as seen here they lose their white felt as they mature.

== In zoology ==
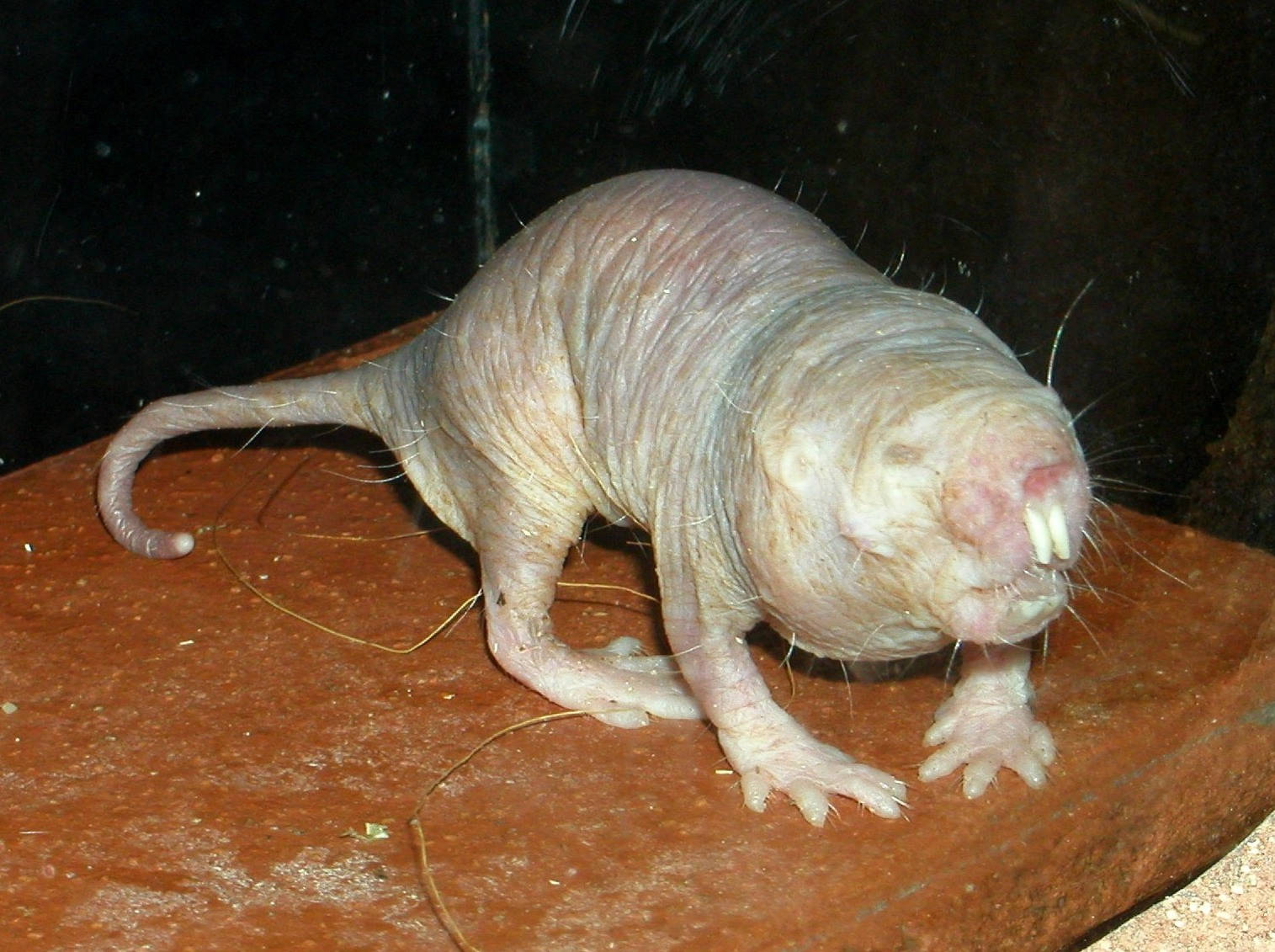
Naked mole-rat (Heterocephalus glaber) in a zoo.

In varying degrees most mammals have some skin areas without natural hair. In humans, glabrous skin is found on the ventral portion of the fingers, palms, soles of feet and lips, which are all parts of the body most closely associated with interacting with the world around us, as are the labia minora and glans penis. There are four main types of mechanoreceptors in the glabrous skin of humans: Pacinian corpuscles, Meissner's corpuscles, Merkel's discs, and Ruffini corpuscles.

The naked mole-rat (Heterocephalus glaber) has evolved skin lacking in general, pelagic hair covering, yet has retained long, very sparsely scattered tactile hairs over its body. Glabrousness is a trait that may be associated with neoteny.

Within entomology, the term glabrous is used to refer to those parts of an insect's body which are lacking in setae (bristles) or scales.

== See also ==
- Glossary of botanical terms
- Glossary of entomology terms
- Trichophilia (hair fetishism)
- Merkin, a "pubic wig"
