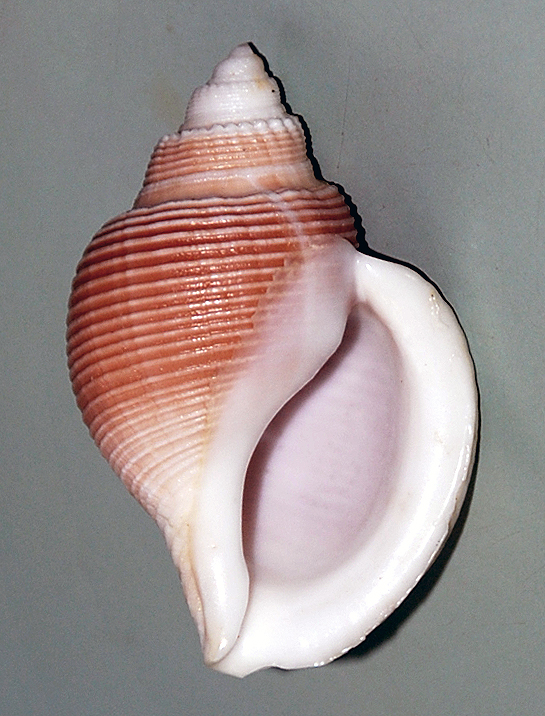
- Eucorys barbouri shell

Scientific classification
- Kingdom: Animalia
- Phylum: Mollusca
- Class: Gastropoda
- Subclass: Caenogastropoda
- Order: Littorinimorpha
- Family: Cassidae
- Subfamily: Cassinae
- Genus: Eucorys; Beu, 2008

= Eucorys =

Genus of gastropods

Eucorys is a genus of large sea snails, marine gastropod molluscs in the family Cassidae, the helmet snails and bonnet snails.

== Species ==
Species within the genus Eucorys include:

- Eucorys barbouri (Clench & Aguayo, 1939)
- Eucorys bartschi (Rehder, 1943)
