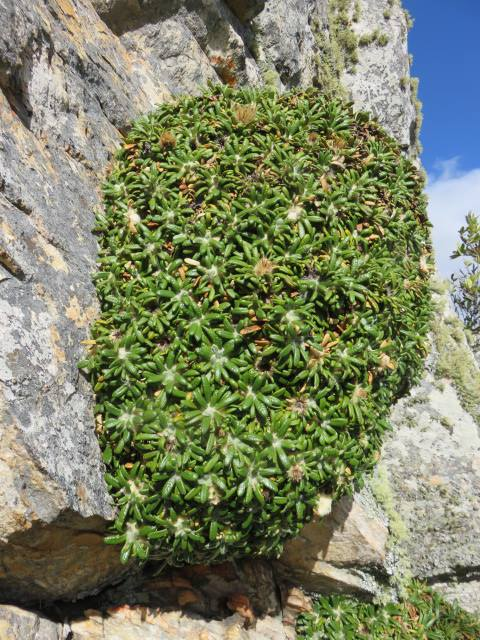

Scientific classification
- Kingdom: Plantae
- Clade: Tracheophytes
- Clade: Angiosperms
- Clade: Eudicots
- Clade: Asterids
- Order: Asterales
- Family: Asteraceae
- Genus: Oldenburgia
- Species: O. paradoxa

Binomial name
- Oldenburgia paradoxa Less.

= Oldenburgia paradoxa =

Species of flowering plant

Oldenburgia paradoxa is a species in the genus Oldenburgia, in the family Asteraceae.

== Description ==
In its habit Oldenburgia paradoxa is a remarkably dense, usually cushion-shaped, subshrub, typically growing in the form of a hemisphere. Plants will sometimes exceed a metre in height, but usually are much shorter, commonly 30 cm or so. The leaves are elliptical, alternate, and in appearance are typical of the genus, leathery, deep green above, and felted white below. They are suggestive of loquat leaves with the margins slightly rolled down. Young leaves are vividly white-felted all over; as they mature, they shed the felt on the upper surface, but retain the felt on their under-surfaces.

Unlike the leaves of other members of the genus, the leaves of Oldenburgia paradoxa are crowded impenetrably closely at the branch tips around the periphery of the plant, and they are much smaller, being some 10 cm long. The branches have thick, corky bark that generally is not visible on an undamaged plant.

The flower heads are pedunculate to nearly sessile, but are exceptional among Oldenburgias, being borne among the leaves at the surface of the plant cushion; the other Oldenburgia species have tall peduncles that stand proud of the plant. The flower heads are about 5 cm in diameter, creamy, sometimes with a tinge of pink or purple. The flowerheads are solitary and terminal.

== Distribution and environment ==
The species is endemic to the mountains of the southern part of the Western Cape Province in South Africa. Its status is not clear; it always was uncommon and persists largely in mountain reserves. It grows in sandstone on cliffs, in rock crevices, and near mountain tops where it has little competition from other plants.
