= Subshrub =

Short woody plant

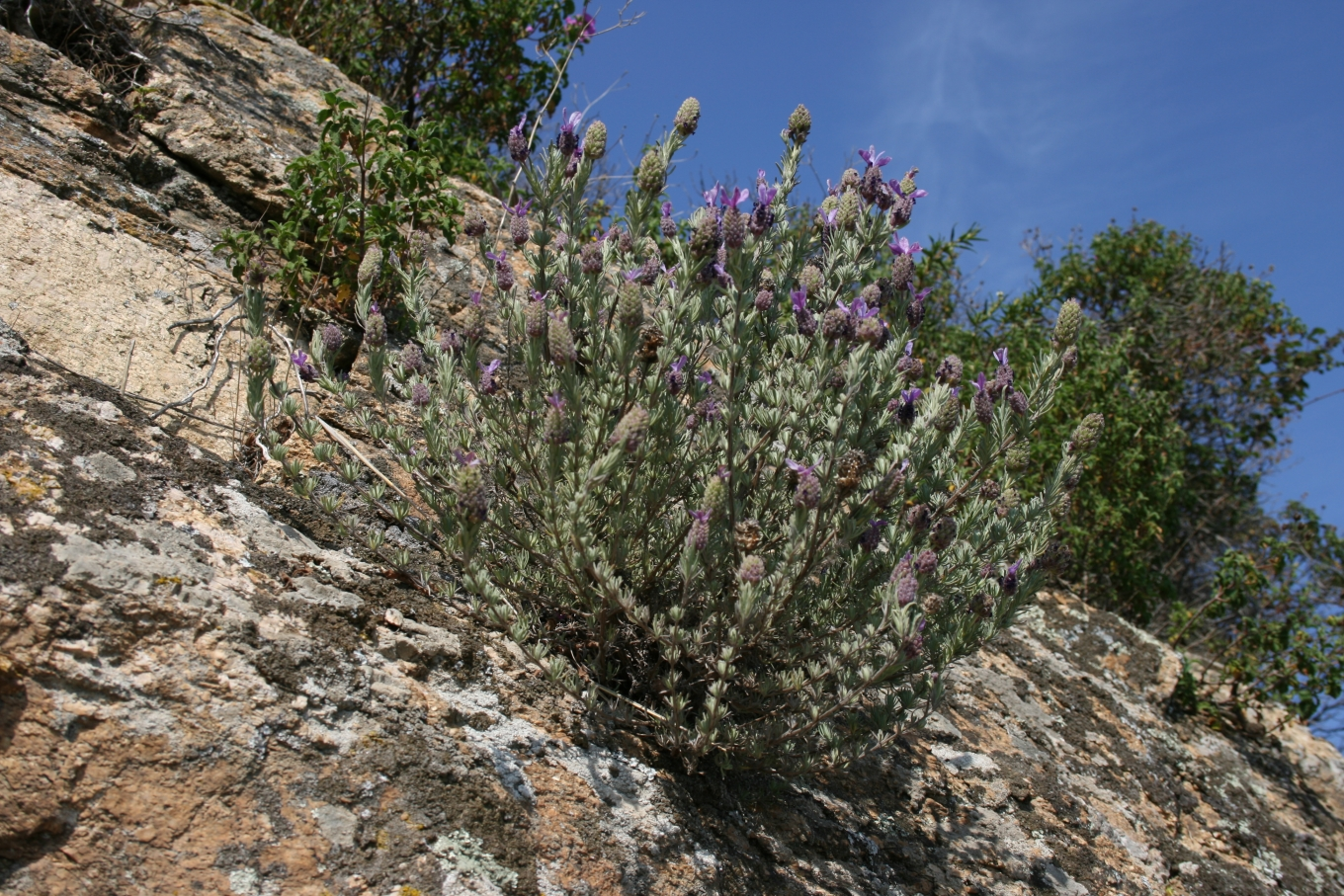
Lavandula stoechas

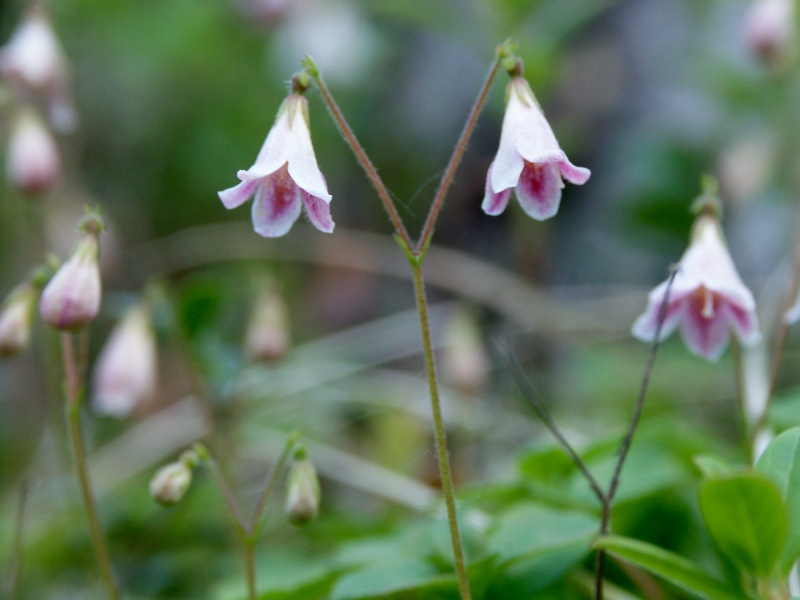
Linnaea borealis

A subshrub (Latin suffrutex), undershrub, or shrublet is either a small shrub (e.g. prostrate shrubs) or a perennial that is largely herbaceous but slightly woody at the base (e.g. garden pink and florist's chrysanthemum). The term is often interchangeable with "bush".

Because the criteria are matters of degree (typically height) rather than kind, the definition of a subshrub is not sharply distinguishable from that of a shrub; examples of reasons for describing plants as subshrubs include ground-hugging stems or a low growth habit. Subshrubs may be largely herbaceous, although still classified as woody, with overwintering perennial woody growth that is much lower-growing than the deciduous summer growth. Some plants described as subshrubs are only weakly woody, and some persist for only a few years at most. Others, such as Oldenburgia paradoxa, live indefinitely (though they are still vulnerable to external effects), rooted in rocky cracks.

Small, low shrubs such as lavender, periwinkle, and thyme, and many shrub-like members of the family Ericaceae, such as cranberries and small species of Erica, are often classed as subshrubs.

== Definition ==
A chamaephyte, subshrub or dwarf-shrub is a plant that bears hibernating buds on persistent shoots near the ground – usually woody plants with perennating buds borne close to the ground, generally less than 25 centimetres (9.8 in) above the soil surface. The significance of the closeness to the ground is that the buds remain within the soil surface layer and are thus somewhat protected from various adverse external influences. Accordingly, the chamaephyte habit is prevalent in stressful environments, for example:

- ecosystems on nutrient-poor soils or rock
- exposed alpine or arctic ecosystems where seasonal or perennial wind and freezing conditions are prone to kill vulnerable growing shoots
- ecosystems subject to frequent fires and burning, where many species of e.g. Banksia or Eucalyptus regrow from a lignotuber or caudex.
- heavily grazed or overgrazed ecosystems, such as tortoise turf

== Examples of chamaephytes ==
The term chamaephyte is most formally used within the context of Raunkiær plant life-forms' classification. Examples of chamaephytes are many of the species living in the maquis shrubland and other plants of submediterranean dry ecosystems (species such as thyme, Thymus vulgaris, and rosemary, Salvia rosmarinus); others include heather species (e.g. Calluna vulgaris and Ericas), African wild olive (Olea europaea subsp. cuspidata) and edelweiss (Leontopodium alpinum). Chamaephytes also include cushion plants.

== See also ==
- Raunkiær plant life-form
- Shrub
- Prostrate shrub
- Woody plant
