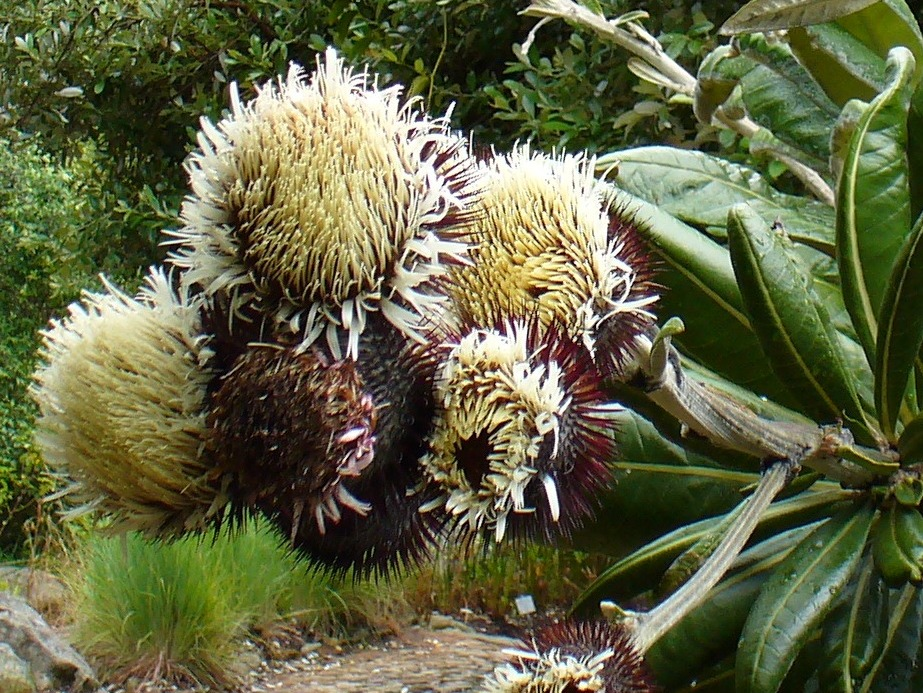
- Oldenbergia grandis

Scientific classification
- Kingdom: Plantae
- Clade: Tracheophytes
- Clade: Angiosperms
- Clade: Eudicots
- Clade: Asterids
- Order: Asterales
- Family: Asteraceae
- Subfamily: Tarchonanthoideae
- Tribe: Oldenburgieae
- Genus: Oldenburgia; Less., 1830

Species
- 4, See text

= Oldenburgia =

Genus of flowering plants

Oldenburgia is a genus of flowering plant in the family Asteraceae. It contains four accepted species, including the commonly cultivated, near-endangered species Oldenburgia grandis (Thunb.) Baill. (=Oldenburgia arbuscula DC.); the petricolous Oldenburgia paradoxa Less. (type-species); Oldenburgia intermedia Bond (small distribution around Cape Town); and Oldenburgia papionum DC. Oldenburgia herbacea (L.) Roxb., an unresolved name. They are endemic to South Africa, southern parts of western and eastern Cape.
