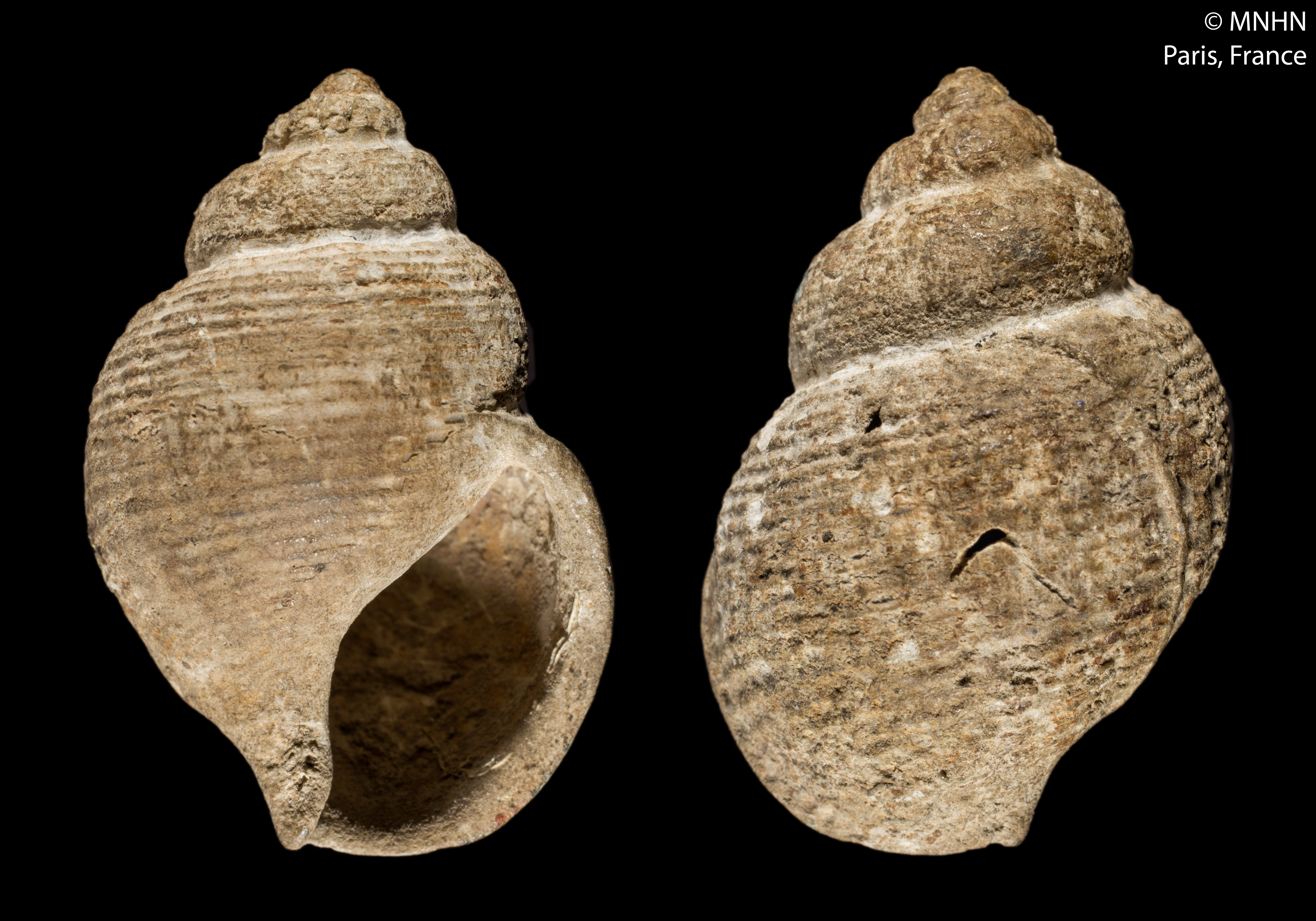
- Shell of Oocorys sulcata (syntype at MNHN, Paris)

Scientific classification
- Kingdom: Animalia
- Phylum: Mollusca
- Class: Gastropoda
- Subclass: Caenogastropoda
- Order: Littorinimorpha
- Family: Cassidae
- Genus: Oocorys
- Species: O. sulcata

Binomial name
- Oocorys sulcata P. Fischer, 1883

Synonyms
- Benthodolium abyssorum Verrill & S. Smith [in Verrill], 1884; Dolium (Eudolium) aulacodes (Tomlin, 1927) (Recombination of synonym); Eudolium aulacodes Tomlin, 1927 (junior synonym); Oocorys abyssorum (Verrill & Smith, 1884); Oocorys elongata Schepman, 1909 (Junior primary homonym of Oocorys sulcata var. elongata Locard, 1897; O. schepmani is a replacement name); Oocorys fischeri Locard, 1897; Oocorys fischeri var. minor Locard, 1897; Oocorys rotunda Dall, 1908; Oocorys schepmani R. D. Turner, 1948; Oocorys sulcata var. elongata Locard, 1897; Oocorys sulcata var. indica E. A. Smith, 1906; Oocorys sulcata var. minor Locard, 1897; Oocorys umbilicata Quinn, 1980; Oocorys watsoni Locard, 1897; Oocorys weberi Schepman, 1909; Tonna (Eudolium) aulacodes (Tomlin, 1927) (Recombination of synonym)

= Oocorys sulcata =

Species of gastropod

Oocorys sulcata is a species of large sea snail, a marine gastropod mollusc in the family Cassidae, the helmet snails and bonnet snails.

== Distribution ==
This species occurs in the Atlantic Ocean off Morocco and the Azores.

== Description ==
The maximum recorded shell length is 55 mm.

== Habitat ==
Minimum recorded depth is 161 m. Maximum recorded depth is 5073 m.
