= Oocorys verrillii =

Scientific classification
- Kingdom: Animalia
- Phylum: Mollusca
- Class: Gastropoda
- Subclass: Caenogastropoda
- Order: Littorinimorpha
- Family: Cassidae
- Genus: Oocorys
- Species: O. verrillii

Binomial name
- Oocorys verrillii (Dall, 1889)

Synonyms
- Benthodolium pacificum Dall, 1896; Dolium (Eudolium) verrillii Dall, 1889 (basionym); Oocorys lussii Bozzetti, 1990; Oocorys verrillii Kreipl & Alf, 2001; Oocorys sulcata caribbaea Clench & Aguayo, 1939; Oocorys sulcata var. cancellata Dautzenberg & H. Fischer, 1897; Oocorys tosaensis Habe & Azuma, 1959

Species of gastropod

Oocorys verrillii is a species of large sea snail, a marine gastropod mollusc in the family Cassidae, the helmet snails and bonnet snails.

== Description ==
The maximum recorded shell length is 47 mm.

== Habitat ==
Minimum recorded depth is 134 m. Maximum recorded depth is 2926 m.
