= Opesia =

Scientific classification
- Kingdom: Animalia
- Phylum: Arthropoda
- Class: Insecta
- Order: Diptera
- Family: Tachinidae
- Subfamily: Phasiinae
- Tribe: Strongygastrini
- Genus: Opesia; Robineau-Desvoidy, 1863

Type species
- Opesia gagatea Robineau-Desvoidy, 1863

Synonyms
- Euxysta Townsend, 1911; Trichoclytia Townsend, 1916

Genus of flies

Opesia is a genus of flies in the family Tachinidae.

== Species ==
- Opesia atrata (Coquillett, 1895)
- Opesia cana (Meigen, 1824)
- Opesia descendens Herting, 1973
- Opesia grandis (Egger, 1860)
