= Opesia cana =

Scientific classification
- Kingdom: Animalia
- Phylum: Arthropoda
- Clade: Pancrustacea
- Class: Insecta
- Order: Diptera
- Family: Tachinidae
- Subfamily: Phasiinae
- Tribe: Strongygastrini
- Genus: Opesia
- Species: O. cana

Binomial name
- Opesia cana (Meigen, 1824)

Synonyms
- Phasia cana Meigen, 1824; Opesia adspersa Robineau-Desvoidy, 1863; Opesia florilega Robineau-Desvoidy, 1863; Opesia gagatea Robineau-Desvoidy, 1863; Phasia rothi Zetterstedt, 1859; Xysta semicana Egger, 1860

Species of fly

Opesia cana is a European species of fly in the family Tachinidae.

== Distribution ==
British Isles, Czech Republic, Hungary, Poland, Romania, Slovakia, Ukraine, Denmark, Finland, Sweden, Bulgaria, Greece, Italy, Portugal, Serbia, Spain, Austria, France, Germany, Switzerland, Iran, Mongolia, Russia, China.
