= Opesia grandis =

Scientific classification
- Kingdom: Animalia
- Phylum: Arthropoda
- Clade: Pancrustacea
- Class: Insecta
- Order: Diptera
- Family: Tachinidae
- Subfamily: Phasiinae
- Tribe: Strongygastrini
- Genus: Opesia
- Species: O. grandis

Binomial name
- Opesia grandis (Egger, 1860)

Synonyms
- Xysta grandis Egger, 1860; Opesia grisea Robineau-Desvoidy, 1863

Species of fly

Opesia grandis is a European and Asian species of fly in the family Tachinidae.

== Distribution ==
British Isles, Czech Republic, Hungary, Poland, Romania, Ukraine, Bulgaria, Italy, Serbia, Austria, France, Germany, Japan, Israel, Mongolia, Russia, Transcaucasia, China.
