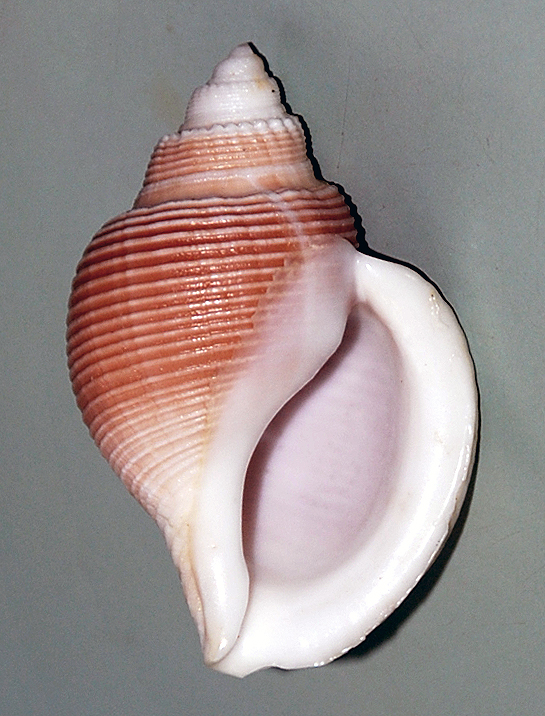
- Eucorys barbouri shell

Scientific classification
- Kingdom: Animalia
- Phylum: Mollusca
- Class: Gastropoda
- Subclass: Caenogastropoda
- Order: Littorinimorpha
- Family: Cassidae
- Genus: Eucorys
- Species: E. barbouri

Binomial name
- Eucorys barbouri Clench & Aguayo, 1939

Synonyms
- Oocorys barbouri Clench & Aguayo, 1939 (basionym)

= Eucorys barbouri =

Species of gastropod

Eucorys barbouri is a species of large sea snail, a marine gastropod mollusc in the family Cassidae, the helmet snails and bonnet snails.

== Distribution ==
Recorded from offshore Barbados, as crabbed shells in deepwater traps.

== Description ==
The maximum recorded shell length is 65 mm.

Abapertural view of a shell of E. barbouri

== Habitat ==
Minimum recorded depth is 238 m. Maximum recorded depth is 1829 m.
