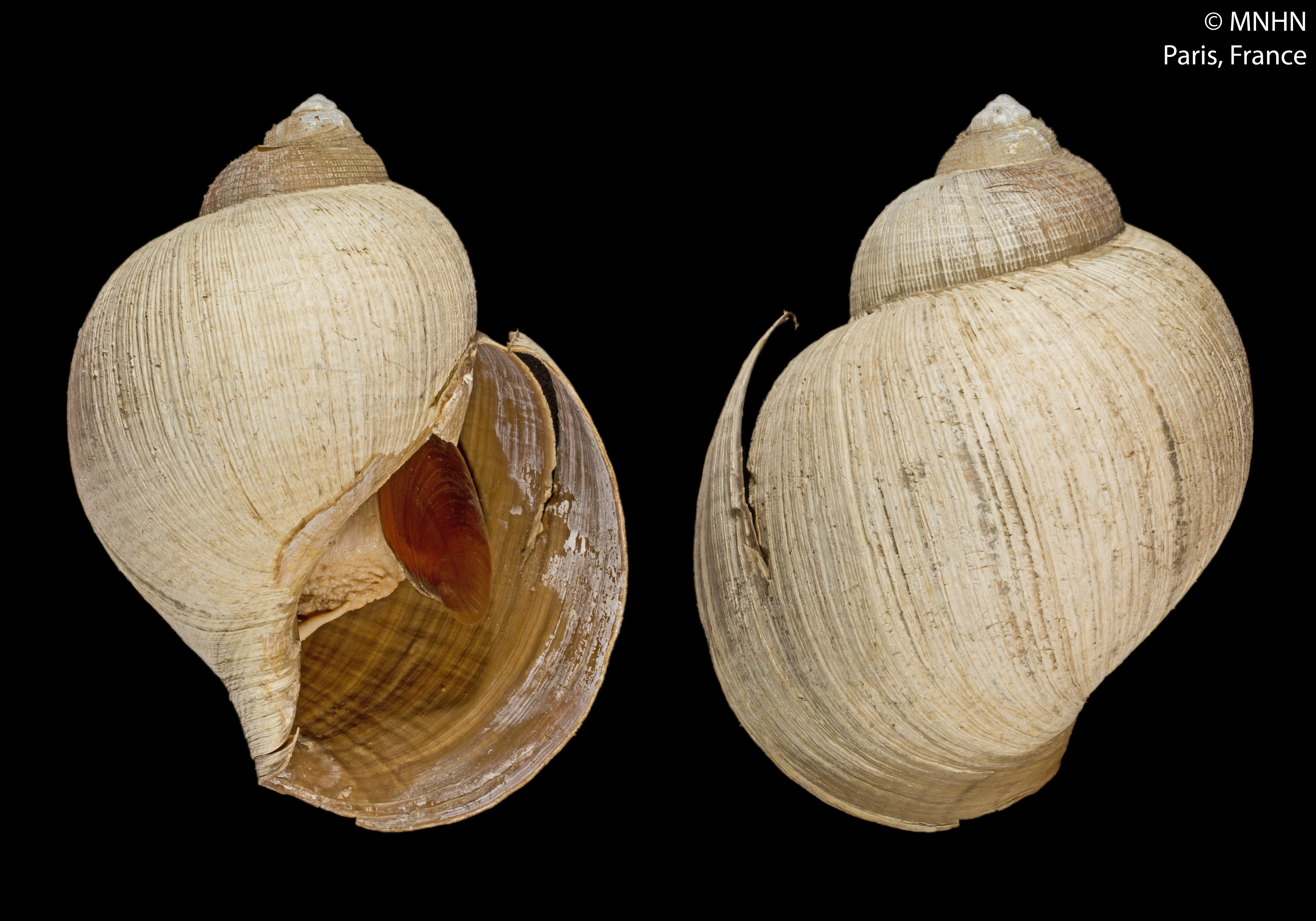
- Shell of Oocorys grandis (holotype at MNHN, Paris)

Scientific classification
- Kingdom: Animalia
- Phylum: Mollusca
- Class: Gastropoda
- Subclass: Caenogastropoda
- Order: Littorinimorpha
- Family: Cassidae
- Genus: Oocorys
- Species: O. grandis

Binomial name
- Oocorys grandis Beu, 2008

= Oocorys grandis =

Species of gastropod

Oocorys grandis is a species of large sea snail, a marine gastropod mollusc in the family Cassidae, the helmet snails and bonnet snails.

== Description ==
The length of the shell attains 103 mm.

The color of the shell is a baige white with the inside having a dark orange color

== Distribution ==
The holotype was found in the Central Indian Ocean at depths between 2953 m and 4660 m.
