= Eucorys bartschi =

Scientific classification
- Kingdom: Animalia
- Phylum: Mollusca
- Class: Gastropoda
- Subclass: Caenogastropoda
- Order: Littorinimorpha
- Family: Cassidae
- Genus: Eucorys
- Species: E. bartschi

Binomial name
- Eucorys bartschi (Rehder, 1943)

Synonyms
- Oocorys bartschi Rehder, 1943 (basionym)

Species of gastropod

Eucorys bartschi is a species of large sea snail, a marine gastropod mollusc in the family Cassidae, the helmet snails and bonnet snails.

== Description ==
The maximum recorded shell length is 135 mm.

== Habitat ==
Minimum recorded depth is 128 m. Maximum recorded depth is 1061 m.
