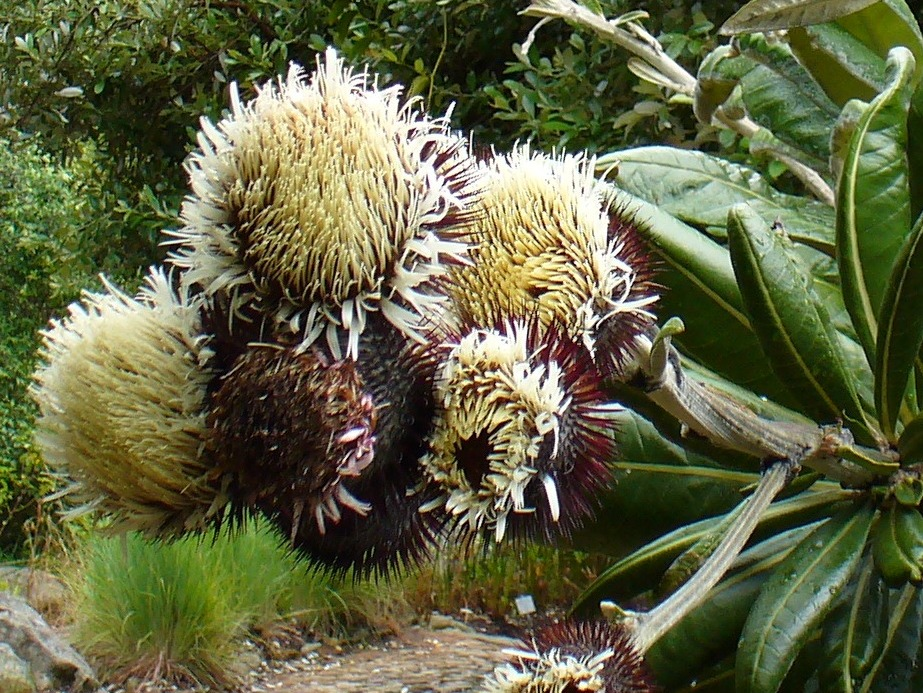

Conservation status
- Near Threatened (IUCN 2.3)

Scientific classification
- Kingdom: Plantae
- Clade: Tracheophytes
- Clade: Angiosperms
- Clade: Eudicots
- Clade: Asterids
- Order: Asterales
- Family: Asteraceae
- Genus: Oldenburgia
- Species: O. grandis

Binomial name
- Oldenburgia grandis (Thunb.) Baill.

= Oldenburgia grandis =

Species of tree

Oldenburgia grandis, commonly known as Suurberg cushion bush or Suurberg-kussingbos, is a shrub or small, gnarled tree in the family Asteraceae.

It occurs in the mountains around Makhanda in South Africa. It grows to a height of about 5 m on sandstone outcrops. It has thick corky bark and large leaves clustered at the ends of branches. The leaves are dark green and leathery, reminiscent of loquat leaves, but generally a good deal larger. The emergent leaves are densely and completely felted with white hair. Most of the felt is lost as the leaf matures, but some persists on under-surfaces.It has woolly young leaves for the cold. Flowers are white or purplish and borne in large heads some 5- to 12 cm in diameter. The flowerheads are terminal; The same plant may bear solitary heads, plus heads borne in loose, irregular panicles.

O. grandis is threatened by habitat loss.

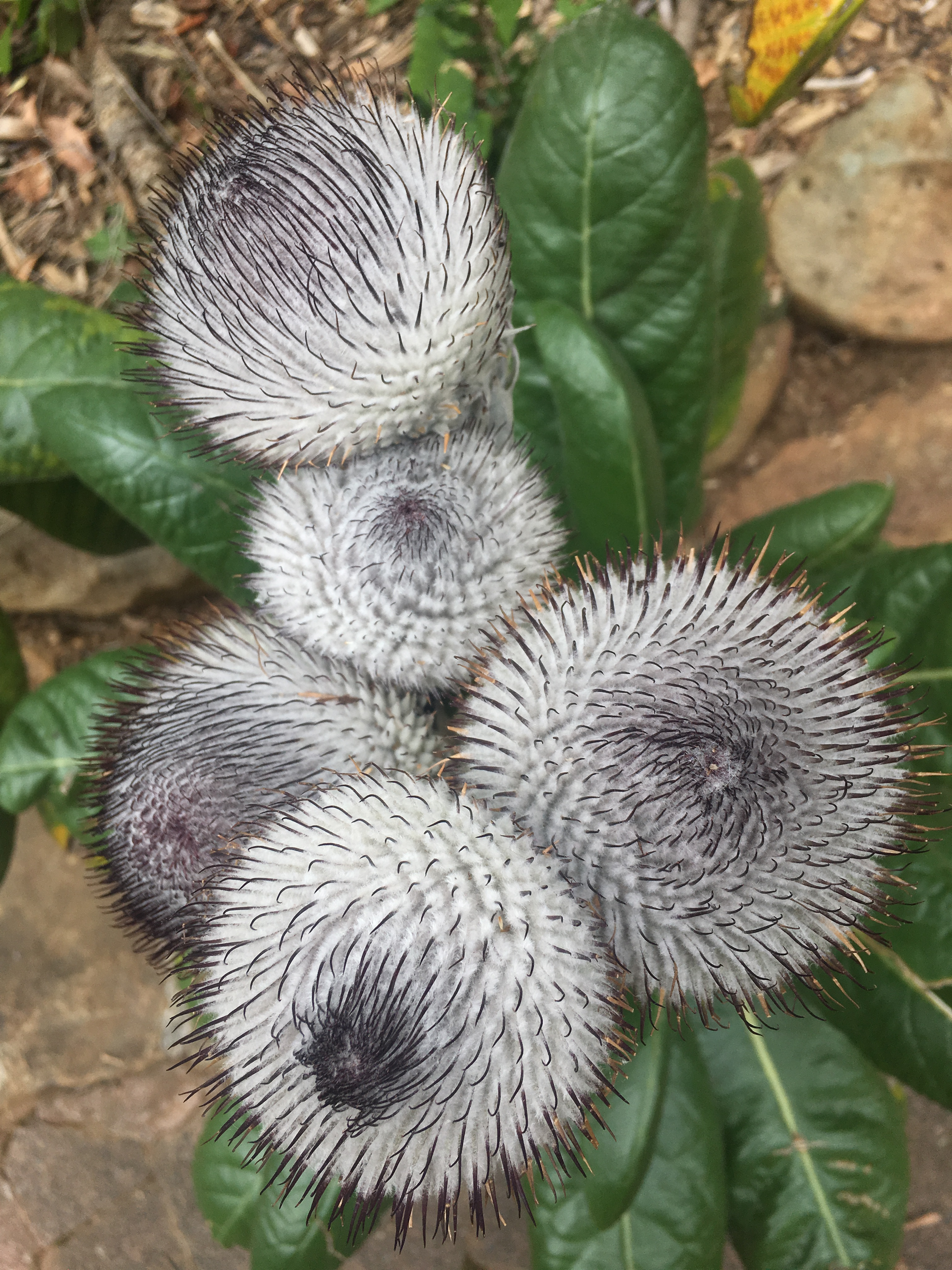
Oldenburgia grandis (flower buds) in Kirstenbosch National Botanical Garden, South Africa

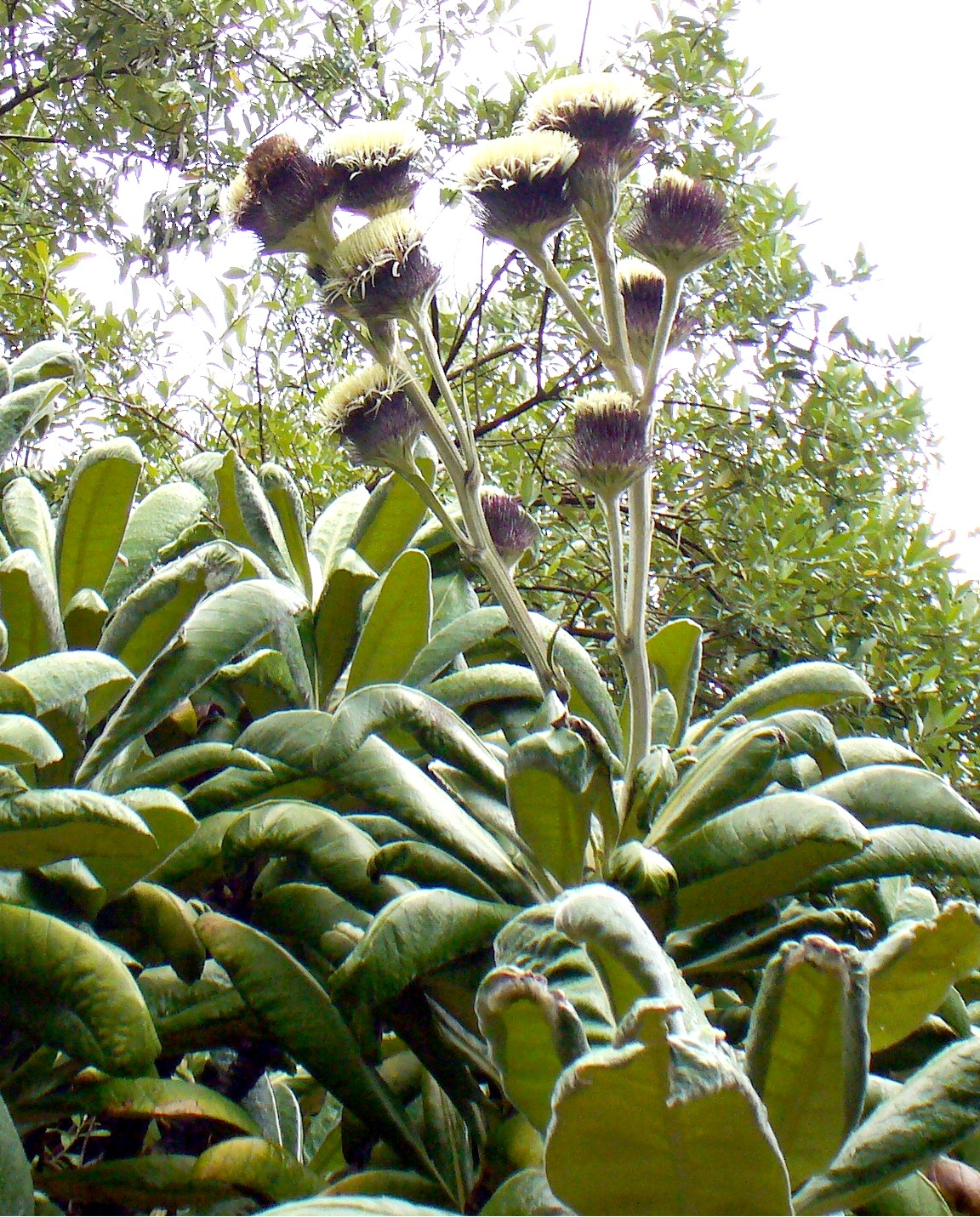
Oldenburgia grandis

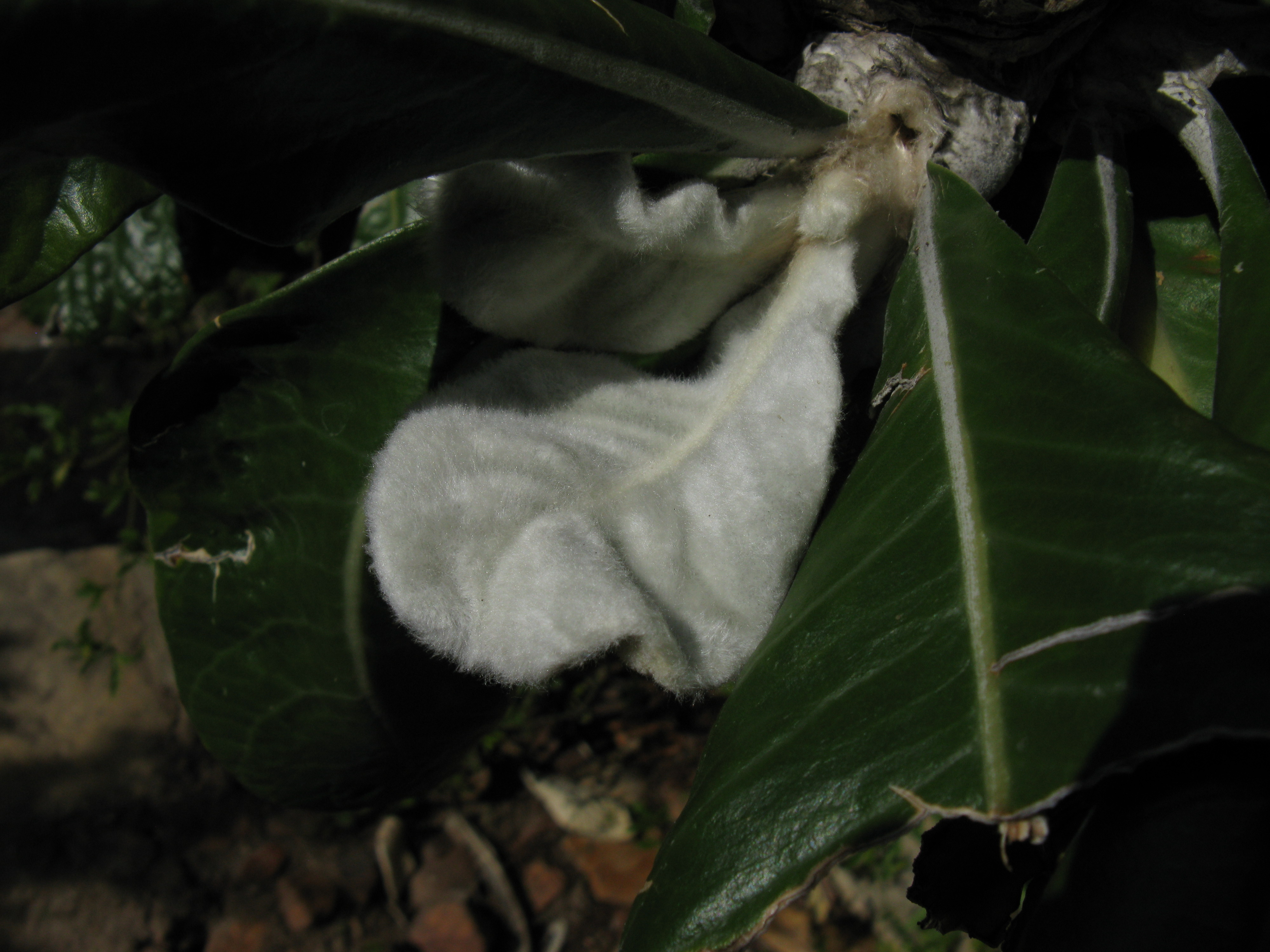
Oldenburgia grandis Felted emerging leaf

== Sources ==
- Hilton-Taylor, C.; et al. (1998). "Oldenburgia grandis". IUCN Red List of Threatened Species. 1998 e.T34944A9899927. doi:10.2305/IUCN.UK.1998.RLTS.T34944A9899927.en.
