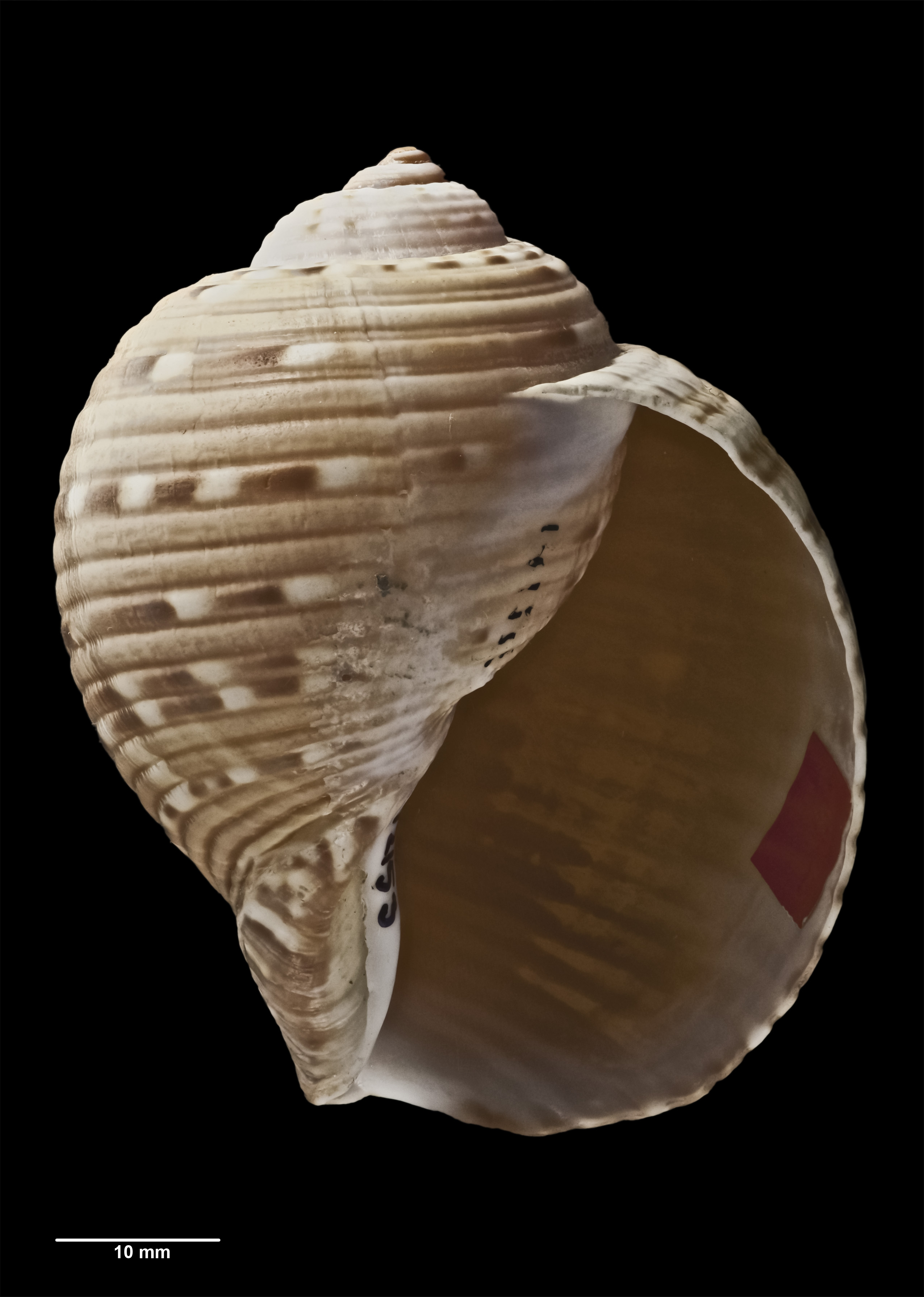
- Tonna cumingii shell

Scientific classification
- Kingdom: Animalia
- Phylum: Mollusca
- Class: Gastropoda
- Subclass: Caenogastropoda
- Order: Littorinimorpha
- Family: Tonnidae
- Genus: Tonna
- Species: T. cumingii

Binomial name
- Tonna cumingii (Reeve, 1849)

Synonyms
- List: Dolium (Dolium) cumingii (Hanley in Reeve, 1849) (Recombination); Dolium (Dolium) cumingii var. perselecta (Iredale, 1931) (Recombination of synonym); Dolium (Dolium) testardi Montrouzier, 1863 (Recombination of synonym); Dolium cumingii Hanley in Reeve, 1849 (original combination); Dolium olearium var. cumingii Hanley in Reeve, 1849; Dolium olearium var. testardi Montrouzier, 1863; Dolium testardi Montrouzier, 1863; Eudolium testardi (Montrouzier, 1863) (Erroneous recombination); Parvitonna perselecta Iredale, 1931; Tonna (Eudolium) perselecta (Iredale, 1931) (Recombination of synonym); Tonna (Tonna) cumingii (Hanley in Reeve, 1849) (Recombination); Tonna (Tonna) testardi (Montrouzier, 1863) (Recombination of synonym); Tonna maoria Powell, 1938

= Tonna cumingii =

Species of gastropod

Tonna cumingi, common name Cuming's tun, is a species of very large sea snail, a tun snail, a marine gastropod mollusc in the family Tonnidae, the tuns.

== Taxonomy ==
The species currently referred to as Tonna cumingii (Hanley in Reeve, 1849) has been referred to as:

- Tonna canaliculata (Linnaeus, 1758) by Thach (2005:91, pl. 23, fig. 5)
- Tonna cumingii 'Reeve' by (a. o.) Hedley (1919:331); Winckworth & Tomlin (1933:209); Hinton (1977:26); Powell (1979:161); Kilburn (1986:4); Thach (2005:91)

The species currently referred to as Tonna chinensis (Dillwyn, 1817) was referred to as Tonna cumingii (Hanley in Reeve, 1849) by Springsteen & Leobrera (1986:100, pl. 26, fig. 2)

The species currently referred to as Tonna poppei Vos, 2005 was illustrated by Cernohorsky (1972:111); Hinton (1974:19, fig. 7; 1977:26 fig. 7a) and referred to as Tonna cumingii 'Reeve'

The species currently referred to as Tonna deshayesii (Reeve, 1849) was referred to as Tonna cumingii 'Reeve' by (a. o.) Powell (1979:61); Cernohorsky (1972:112)

Additional information on Cernohorsky (1972:111-112): Whilst showing specimens of Tonna poppei Vos, 2005 on pl. 30, figs 5, Cernohorsky lists this species as Tonna cumingii (Reeve, 1849), with in synonymy: "Synonyms of T. cumingii are deshayesii Reeve, 1849, perselecta Iredale, 1931, and maoria Powell, 1938. Tonna magnifica (Sowerby III 1904) belongs either to T. cumingii or T. chinensis " (fide Cernohorsy, 1972:112)

== Distribution ==
This species is found often off the southern coasts of India and Sri Lanka. Populations of animals with similar-looking shells from New Zealand and Australian waters have been assimilated into this species. Occasional records indicate a possible presence of the species in Philippine waters. Further study on this species should reveal its exact distribution. (Reference: Vos, 2007, A Conchological Iconography - Family Tonnidae)

== Shell description ==
The shell height is up to 91 mm, and width up to 66 mm.

(Original description) The shell is globosely ovate, thin, and ventricose, and it is distinctly umbilicated. It consists of seven whorls, which are transversely covered with numerous ribs; these ribs are somewhat flattened and closely set, while the interstices are marked by linear grooves. The columella is slightly twisted, and the lip is simple. The coloration is a fulvous chestnut, peculiarly clouded in a banded pattern with brown and white spots.
