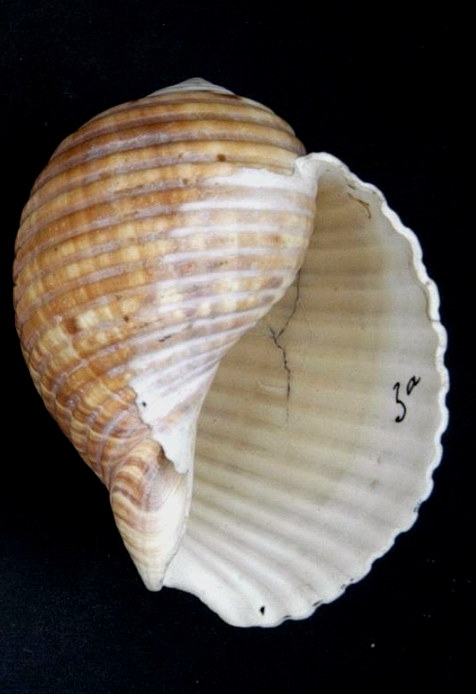
- Apertural view of a shell of Tonna variegata (museum specimen at Naturalis Biodiversity Center)

Scientific classification
- Kingdom: Animalia
- Phylum: Mollusca
- Class: Gastropoda
- Subclass: Caenogastropoda
- Order: Littorinimorpha
- Family: Tonnidae
- Genus: Tonna
- Species: T. variegata

Binomial name
- Tonna variegata (Linnaeus, 1758)

Synonyms
- Dolium (Dolium) variegatum Lamarck, 1822 (Recombination); Dolium (Dolium) variegatum var. angusta Hanley, 1860; Dolium kieneri Philippi, 1847; Dolium variegatum Lamarck, 1822 (original combination); Dolium variegatum var. angusta Hanley, 1860; Tonna (Tonna) variegata (Lamarck, 1822) (Recombination); Tonna chinensis angusta (Hanley, 1860) (Recombination of synonym)

= Tonna variegata =

Variegated tun

Species of gastropod

Tonna variegata, commonly known as the variegated tun, is a species of marine gastropod mollusc in the family Tonnidae (also known as the tun shells).

The forma Tonna variegata f. dunkeri (Hanley, 1860) is a synonym of Tonna dunkeri (Hanley, 1860)

== Description ==
The size of the shell varies between 70 mm and 200mm.

The thin shell has an ovate-globose, ventricose shape. The spire is composed of six convex whorls, slightly separated by a shallow suture, and loaded with transverse rounded ribs, which are very approximate. The body whorl composes, itself, almost the whole of the shell. Twenty to twenty-six transverse ribs may be counted upon its surface, among which, in old specimens, are found other smaller ones which are alternately disposed between the first, towards the most elevated part. All the ribs are separated by furrows which are not throughout of the same size. The aperture is wide, large and ovate. Its lips are white, and the interior reddish. The outer lip, terminated by a scolloped dilatation, is traversed by a canal of no great depth. The inner lip is white, thin, applied to the body of the body whorl and forms a part of the umbilicus. The columella is twisted spirally. The coloring of the exterior is whitish, varied with red, and covered, upon the transverse ribs, with irregular spots which sometimes form longitudinal or zigzag bands of a deeper color. Upon some specimens are observed ribs which have no other tint of coloring than the ground of the shell. Young specimens are diaphanous and slightly colored by spots. The periostracum is thin and reddish.

== Distribution ==
This marine species occurs off South and Southeast Africa; off New Zealand and off Australia (Western Australia).
