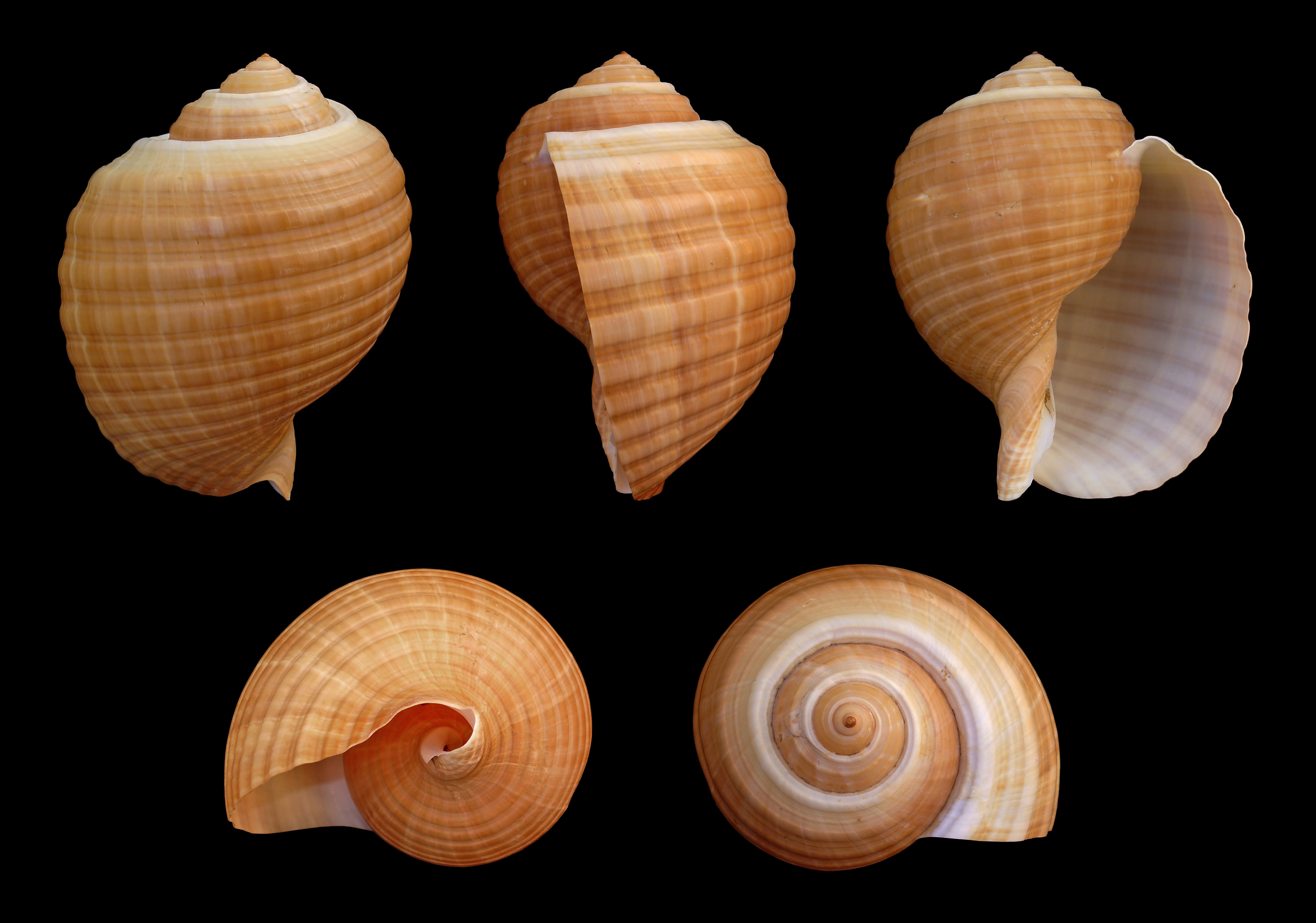
- Five views of a shell of Tonna galea
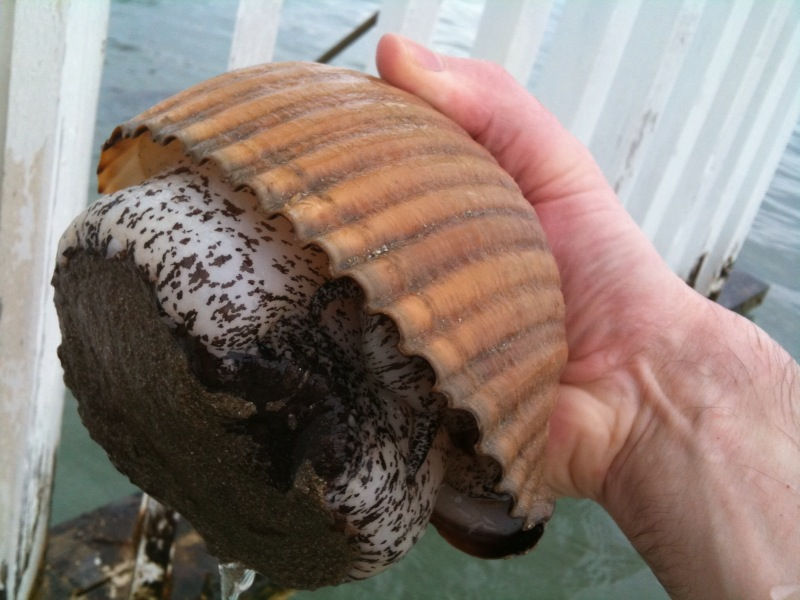
- A live giant tun, from Greece

Scientific classification
- Kingdom: Animalia
- Phylum: Mollusca
- Class: Gastropoda
- Subclass: Caenogastropoda
- Order: Littorinimorpha
- Family: Tonnidae
- Genus: Tonna
- Species: T. galea

Binomial name
- Tonna galea (Linnaeus, 1758)

Synonyms
- See List of synonyms

= Tonna galea =

Giant tun

Species of gastropod

Tonna galea, commonly known as the giant tun, is a species of marine gastropod mollusc in the family Tonnidae (also known as the tun shells). This very large sea snail or tun snail is found in the North Atlantic Ocean as far as the coast of West Africa, in the Mediterranean Sea and the Caribbean Sea. The species was first described by Carl Linnaeus in 1758.

== Description ==
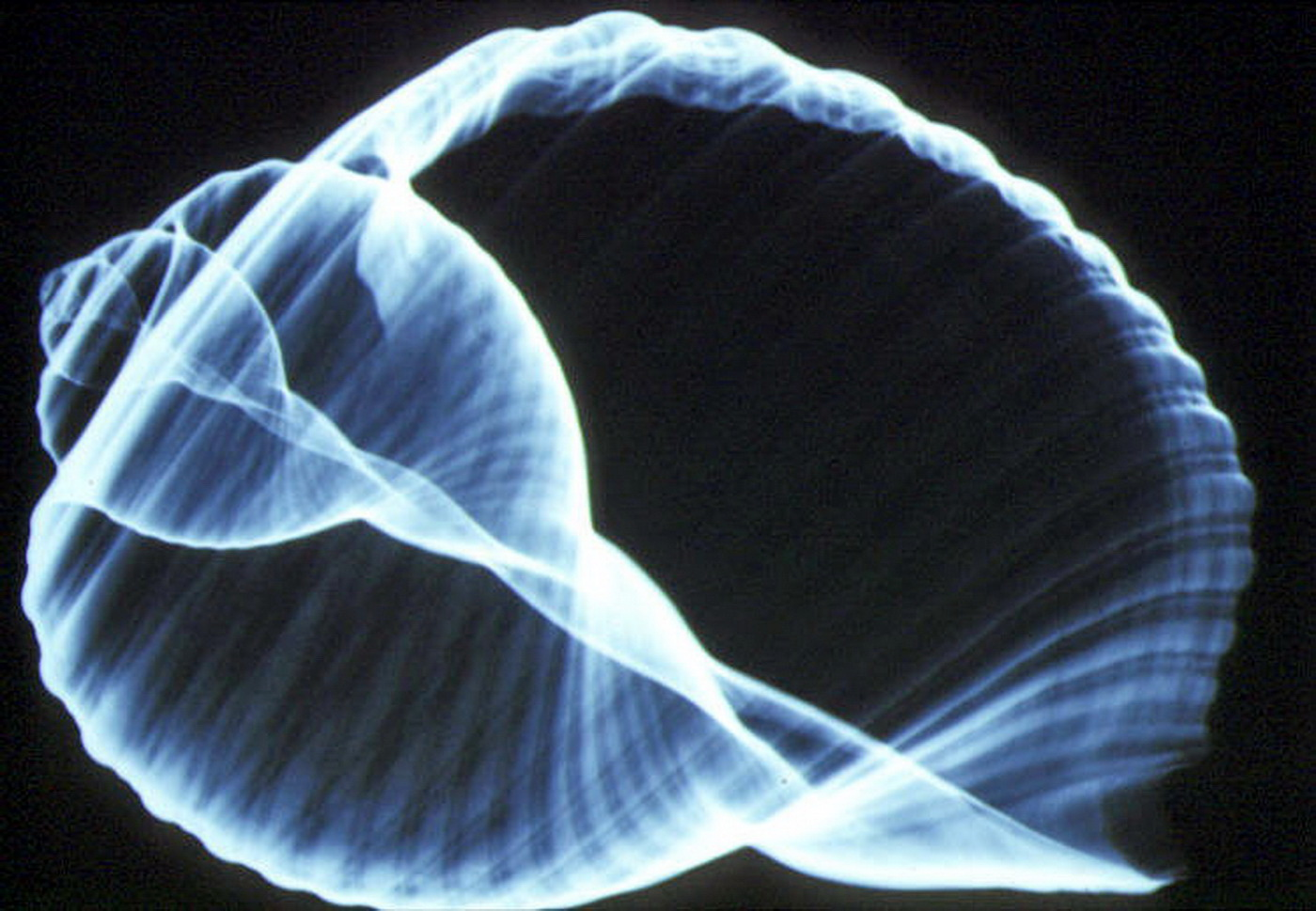
X-ray image of a shell of Tonna galea

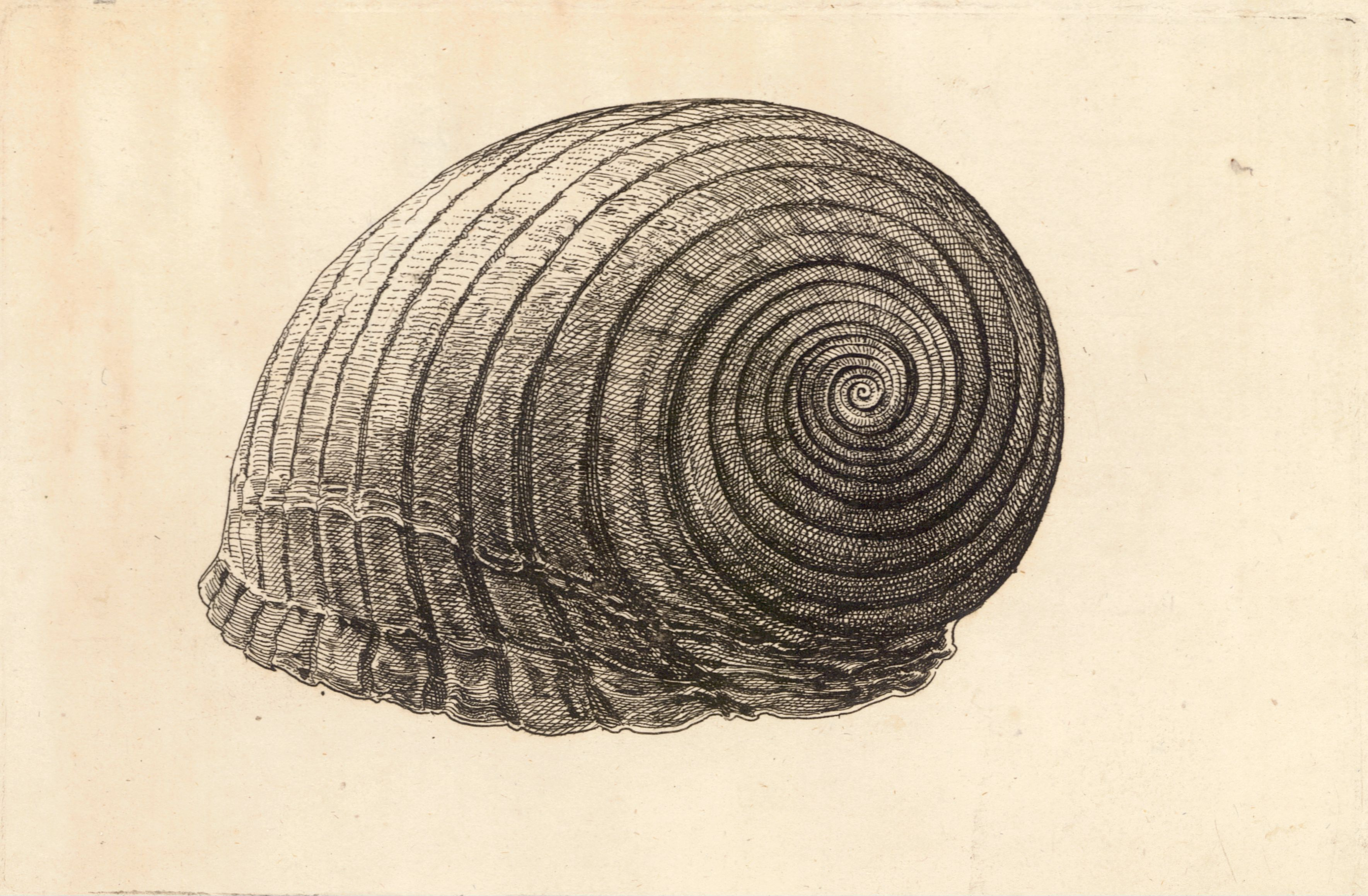
17th-century engraving of Tonna galea by Wenceslas Hollar. The image is reversed because of the engraving process.

The ventricose shell of adult Tonna galea is very large, with an average height of 6 inches (150 mm). Specimens of this species have been quoted of the size of a man's head. The shell is thin and inflated, but still relatively solid and durable. The shell is almost diaphanous when young; at that time the transverse ribs of the surface are only indicated by lines of a slightly deeper tint. In terms of its weight however, the thin shell is very much lighter than the shell of most other large sea snails. The aperture of the shell is "distinctly round" and wide.

The conical spire is formed of six convex, very distinct whorls, loaded externally with wide, flat, slightly raised ribs, separated by narrow and superficial furrows. The whorls of the spire are isolated by a deep channeled suture. The body whorl is rounded and very ventricose. The aperture is large, subovate, colored interiorly with reddish, and marked with transverse ribs corresponding to the furrows without. The outer lip is dilated, undulated, tinged with black, or a deep brown upon the edge. The inner lip is whitish, spread out in a very thin plate upon the belly of the body whorl. The columella is smooth, polished, and forms at the left of the umbilicus a thick rib, marked by transverse striae, which terminates at the emargination of the base. The external surface of this shell is of a uniform reddish fawn color; nevertheless the ribs are varied with wide spots or irregular brown and white blotches which are very remarkable.

The animal is of a clear brownish red, without spots, and its tentacles are encircled, towards the point, with a wide reddish-brown ring. The foot beneath is of a dark violet, with the edge embroidered with deep brown. Tonna galea possess large salivary glands. The structure of these glands was first described and detailed by Heinrich Weber in 1927. Furthermore, the giant tun is also a luminescent species; this is an extremely rare characteristic among the prosobranch gastropods. The animal gives off light that is green-white in colour when it traverses through the water with its foot "well-extended".

== Distribution and habitat ==
This large sea snail is found in the North Atlantic Ocean (specifically the Canary Islands and Madeira), the Mediterranean Sea, the Caribbean Sea, and in the waters off the coast of Angola, Cape Verde and West Africa. The preferred habitat for this species is seabeds that are muddy or sandy with seagrass beds. In the Mediterranean, these snails are typically found at depths ranging from just beneath the surface to 120 metres (390 ft).

Tonna galea has been placed on Annex II of both the Berne Convention on the Conservation of European Wildlife and Natural Habitats and the Protocol of the Barcelona Convention for Protection against Pollution in the Mediterranean Sea. In spite these designations, it continues to be "exploited".

== Ecology ==
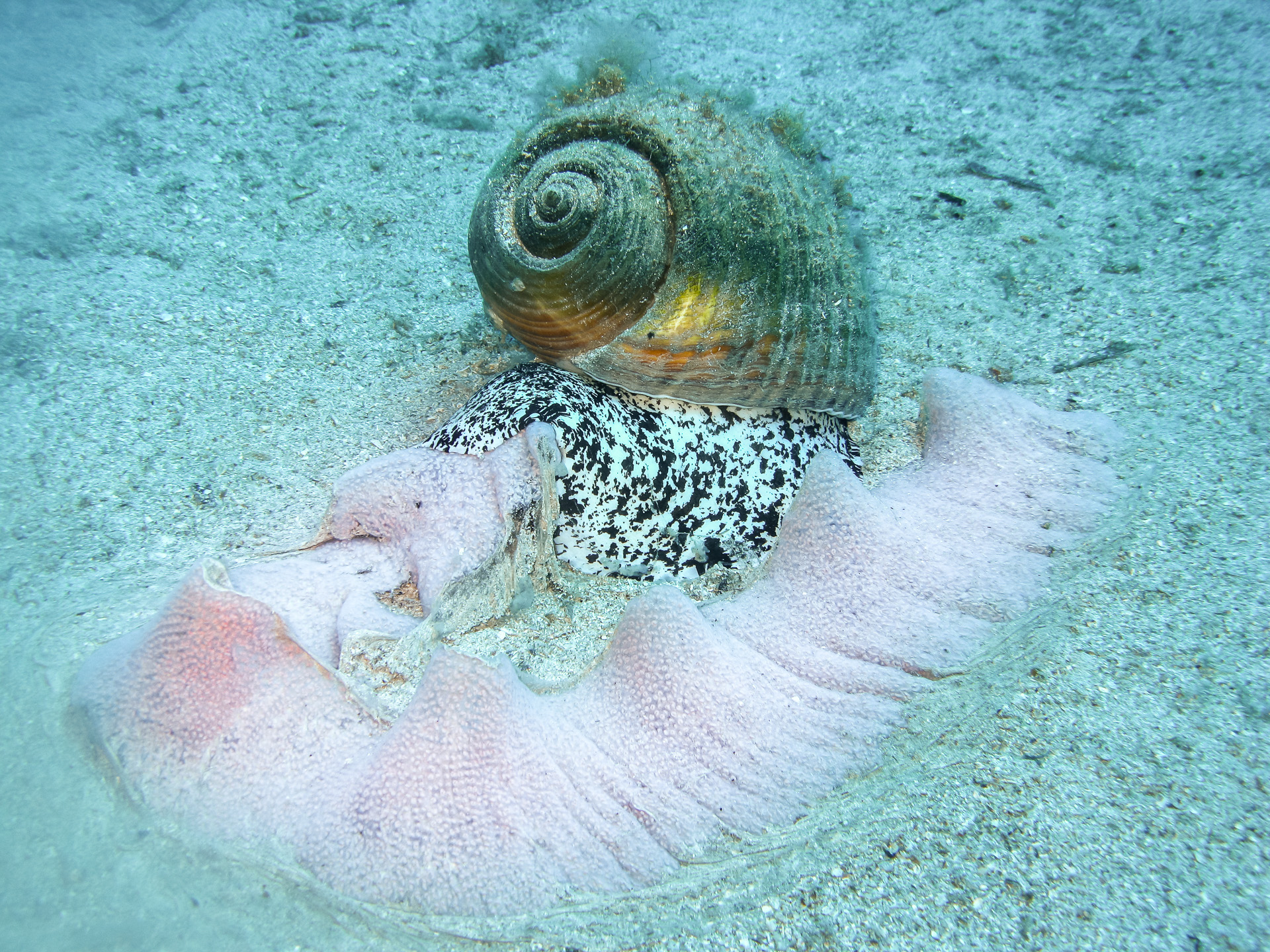
The female lays her eggs on the sandy bottom.

Information on the biology and life history of Tonna galea is scarce, due to the fact that the species has only rarely been studied. It is carnivorous, and utilizes its two proboscises—located on top of its head—to envelop its prey, which primarily consists of sea cucumbers. To a lesser extent it also feeds on sea urchins, starfish. fish, bivalves and crustaceans. As a defense mechanism, the snail will squirt its highly-acidic saliva when disturbed. This contains approximately 2–5% sulfuric acid, which is used to kill its prey. The presence of this acid was recorded by Franz Hermann Troschel in 1854. Females lay eggs on the sandy bottom in the form of wrinkled egg rosette.

== List of synonyms ==
This is a list of all the various scientific names that have been applied to this species over time.

- Buccinum galea Linnaeus, 1758 (original combination)
- Buccinum olearium Linnaeus, 1758
- Cadium galea (Linnaeus, 1758)
- Cadus galea (Linnaeus, 1758)
- Dolium (Dolium) galea (Linnaeus, 1758)
- Dolium (Dolium) galea antillarum (Mörch, 1877)
- Dolium (Dolium) galea var. brasiliana (Mörch, 1877)
- Dolium (Dolium) galea var. epidermata (de Gregorio, 1884)
- Dolium (Dolium) galea var. spirintrorsum (de Gregorio, 1884)
- Dolium (Dolium) galea var. tardina (de Gregorio, 1884)
- Dolium antillarum Mörch, 1877
- Dolium antillarum var. brasiliana Mörch, 1877
- Dolium epidermata de Gregorio, 1884
- Dolium galea (Linnaeus, 1758)
- Dolium galea var. epidermata de Gregorio, 1884
- Dolium galea var. spirintrorsa de Gregorio, 1884
- Dolium galea var. spirintrorsum de Gregorio, 1884
- Dolium galea var. tardina de Gregorio, 1884
- Dolium galeatum Locard, 1886
- † Dolium modjokasriense Martin, 1899
- Dolium tardina de Gregorio, 1884
- Dolium tenue Menke, 1830
- Tonna (Tonna) galea (Linnaeus, 1758)
- Tonna (Tonna) galea brasiliana (Mörch, 1877)
- Tonna (Tonna) galea galea (Linnaeus, 1758)
- Tonna galea abbotti Macsotay & Campos, 2001
- Tonna galea brasiliana (Mörch, 1877)
- Tonna olearium (Linnaeus, 1758)
