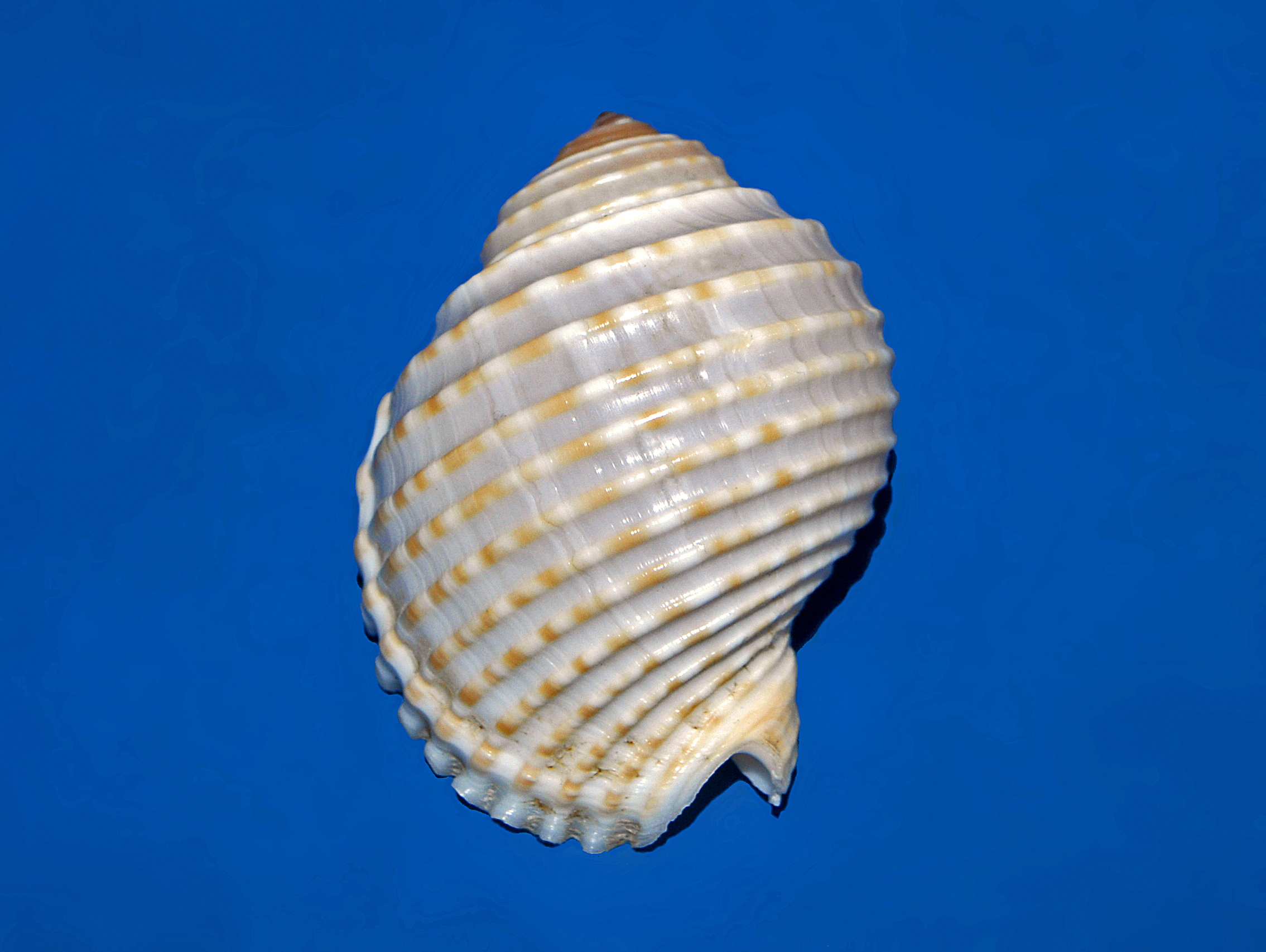
- A Shell of Tonna tessellata from Japan on display at the Museo Civico di Storia Naturale di Milano

Scientific classification
- Kingdom: Animalia
- Phylum: Mollusca
- Class: Gastropoda
- Subclass: Caenogastropoda
- Order: Littorinimorpha
- Family: Tonnidae
- Genus: Tonna
- Species: T. tessellata

Binomial name
- Tonna tessellata (Lamarck, 1816)

Synonyms
- Cadus doliolum Röding, 1798; Dolium (Dolium) dolium var. parvula (Tapparone Canefri, 1878) superseded combination; Dolium costatum var. fimbriatum G. B. Sowerby I, 1827; Dolium fimbriatum Sowerby I, 1827; Dolium fimbriatum var. parvulum Tapparone-Canefri, 1878; Dolium minjac Deshayes, 1844; Dolium tessellatum Lamarck, 1816; Tonna (Tonna) dolium parvula (Tapparone Canefri, 1878) superseded combination; Tonna (Tonna) tessellata (Lamarck, 1816) (Recombination); Tonna maculata (Lamarck, 1822) (Recombination of synonym); Tonna parvula (Tapparone Canefri, 1878) superseded combination

= Tonna tessellata =

Species of gastropod

Tonna tessellata, the mosaic tun, tessellate tun or maculated tun, is a species of large sea snail, a marine gastropod mollusk in the family Tonnidae.

== Description ==
The shell of an adult Tonna tessellata can be as large as 45–150 millimetres (1.8–5.9 in). It is a relatively thin and light weight shell, nearly spherical. The body whorl is inflated, with a very wide aperture. Surface is white, smooth and glossy, with distinctive brown-red markings and sculptured by thick spiral ribs. It lacks the operculum. This sea snail feeds on crustaceans, sea urchins and fishes.

== Distribution ==
This species is widespread from South Africa, Madagascar and Western Pacific to Australia, New Zealand, Thailand, Indonesia, Papua New Guinea, Vietnam, Philippines and Japan. It lives in sandy seabed, at depths of 0 to 50 m.

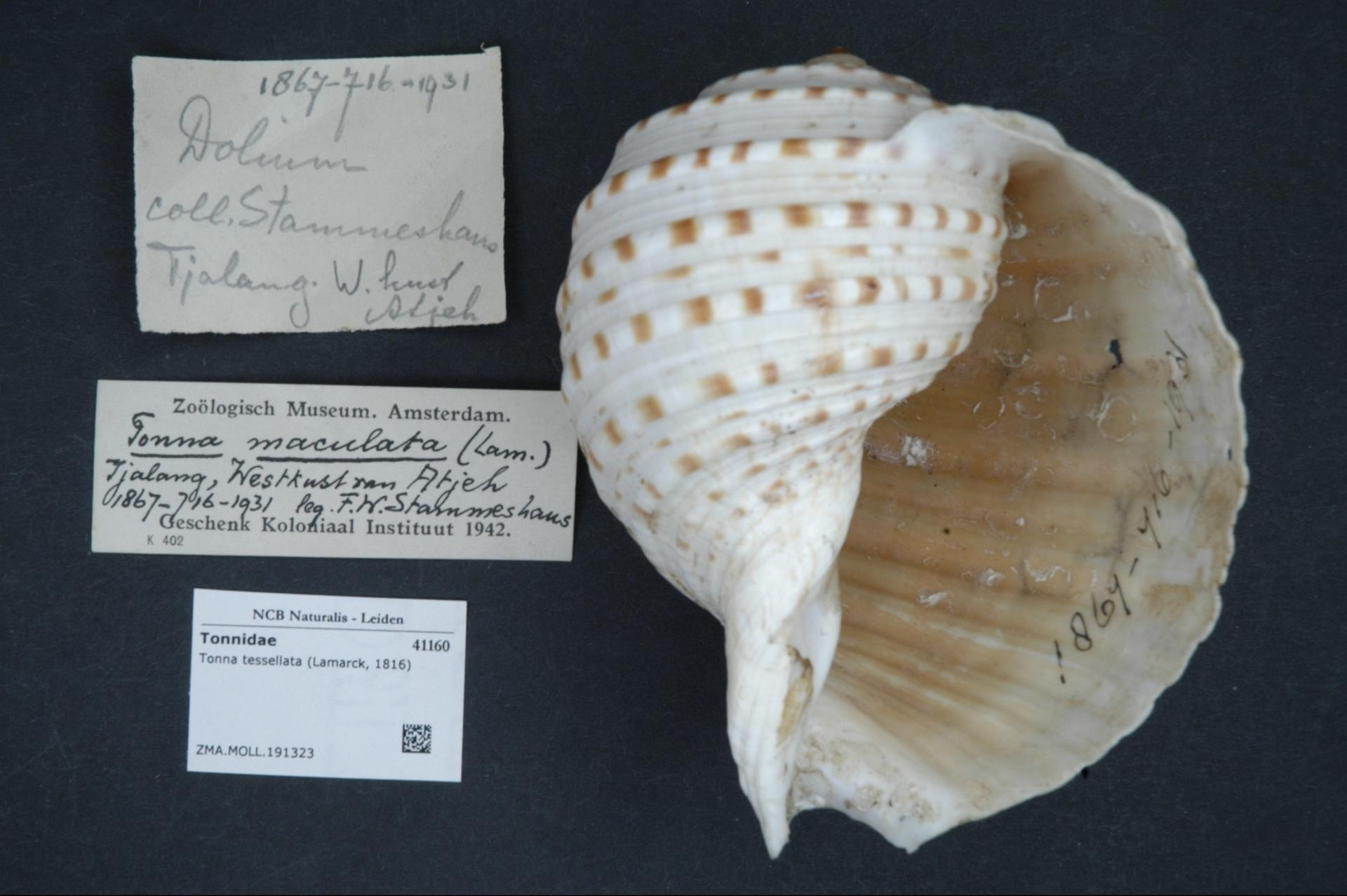
Museum specimen. Naturalis
