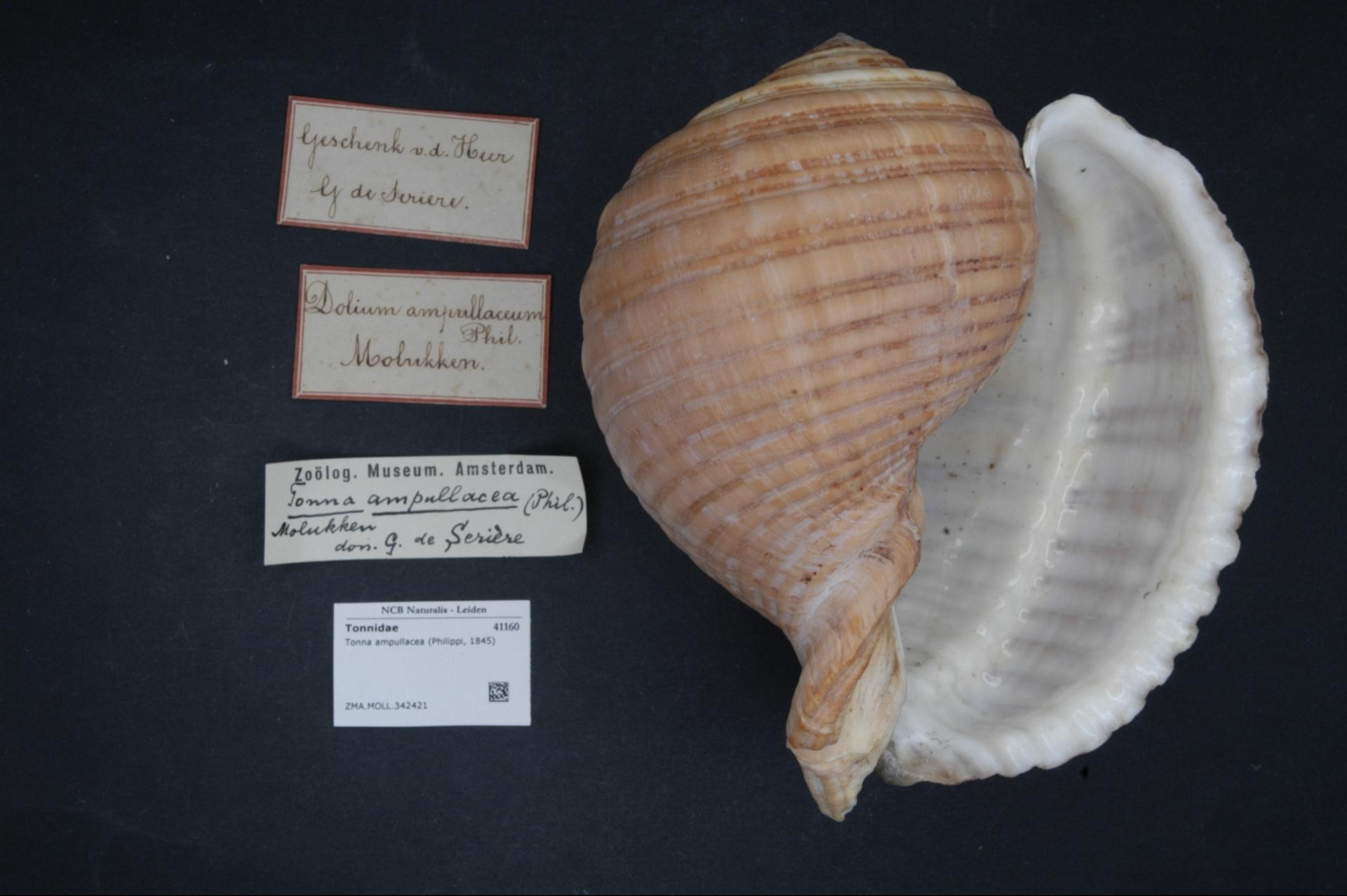

Scientific classification
- Kingdom: Animalia
- Phylum: Mollusca
- Class: Gastropoda
- Subclass: Caenogastropoda
- Order: Littorinimorpha
- Family: Tonnidae
- Genus: Tonna
- Species: T. ampullacea

Binomial name
- Tonna ampullacea (Philippi, 1845)

Synonyms
- Dolium ampullaceum Philippi, 1845; Dolium costatum Tryon, 1885

= Tonna ampullacea =

Species of gastropod

Tonna ampullacea is a species of large sea snail, a marine gastropod mollusk in the family Tonnidae, the tun shells.
