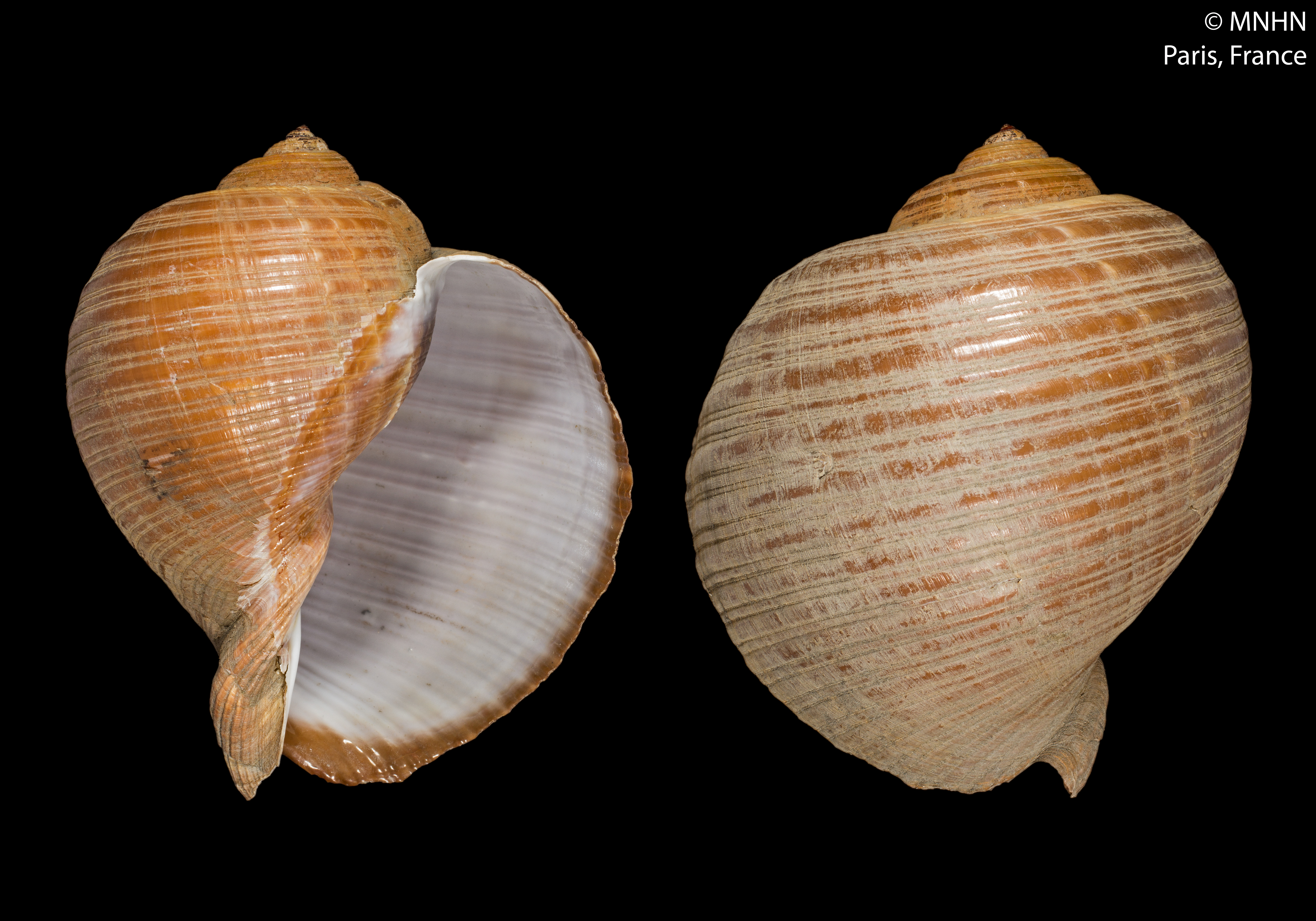
- Shell of Tonna zonata (neotype at MNHN, Paris)

Scientific classification
- Kingdom: Animalia
- Phylum: Mollusca
- Class: Gastropoda
- Subclass: Caenogastropoda
- Order: Littorinimorpha
- Family: Tonnidae
- Genus: Tonna
- Species: T. zonata

Binomial name
- Tonna zonata (Green, 1830)

Synonyms
- Dolium (Dolium) zonatum Green, 1830 superseded combination; Dolium (Eudolium) zonatum Green, 1830 superseded combination; Dolium crenulatum Philippi, 1845; Dolium zonatum Green, 1830; Tonna (Tonna) zonata (Green, 1830) (Recombination)

= Tonna zonata =

Species of gastropod

Tonna zonata is a species of large sea snail, a marine gastropod mollusk in the family Tonnidae, the tun shells.

== Description ==
The length of the shell varies between 100 mm and 280 mm.

== Distribution ==
This marine species has a wide distribution : East China Sea, South China Sea, the Philippines, Indonesia, Japan, and New Zealand.

== Life cycle and mating behavior ==
Members of the order Neotaenioglossa are mostly gonochoric and broadcast spawners. Life cycle: Embryos develop into planktonic trocophore larvae and later into juvenile veligers before becoming fully grown adults.
