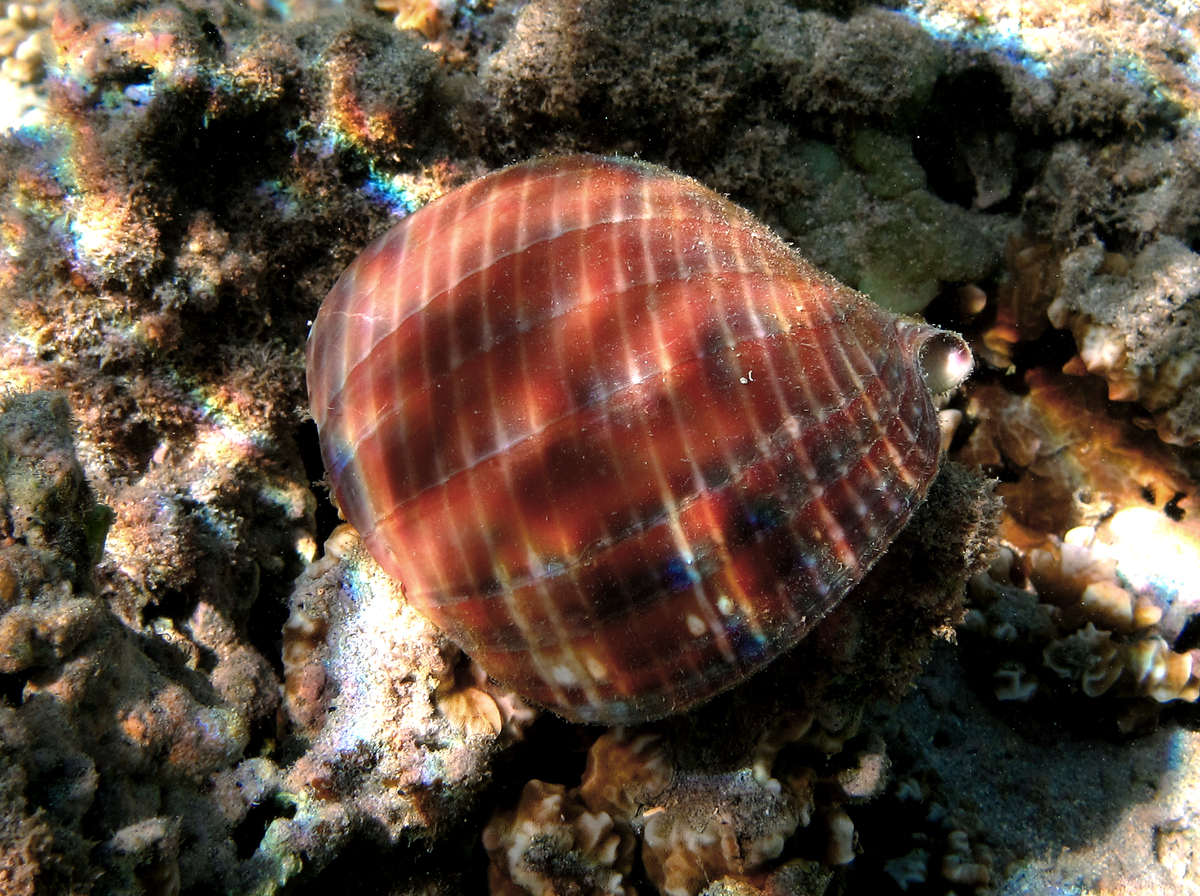
- A live species of Tonna canaliculata

Scientific classification
- Kingdom: Animalia
- Phylum: Mollusca
- Class: Gastropoda
- Subclass: Caenogastropoda
- Order: Littorinimorpha
- Family: Tonnidae
- Genus: Tonna
- Species: T. canaliculata

Binomial name
- Tonna canaliculata (Linnaeus, 1758)

Synonyms
- Buccinum galea Wood, 1825; Buccinum olearium Bruguière, 1789; Buccinum olearium Dillwyn, 1817; Bulla canaliculata Linnaeus, 1758; Cadium olearium Link, 1807; Cadus cepa Röding, 1798; Dolium cepa Martini, 1777; Dolium marmoreum Schröter in Martini, 1788

= Tonna canaliculata =

Species of gastropod

Tonna canaliculata is a species of large sea snail, a marine gastropod mollusk in the family Tonnidae, the tun shells.

== Description ==
This type of sea snail is distinguished from many others by the fact that its fleshy foot is so much larger than its shell. As with land snails, this gastropod ("stomach-footed") secretes mucus which helps it glide across the bottom.

Its shell length varies between 30 mm and 145 mm., with its long siphon (for respiration) and tentacles (with eyes at their base) clearly visible. They are known for their thin shells. They are night predators and are usually seen in sandy areas, feeding on bivalve molluscs (clams, oysters, mussels and scallops) and sea cucumbers.

== Distribution ==
This marine species occurs in the Indo-Pacific.
