= Tonna tetracotula =

Scientific classification
- Kingdom: Animalia
- Phylum: Mollusca
- Class: Gastropoda
- Subclass: Caenogastropoda
- Order: Littorinimorpha
- Family: Tonnidae
- Genus: Tonna
- Species: T. tetracotula

Binomial name
- Tonna tetracotula Hedley, 1919

Species of gastropod

Tonna tetracotula is a species of very large sea snail or tun snail, a marine gastropod mollusc in the family Tonnidae, the tun shells.
