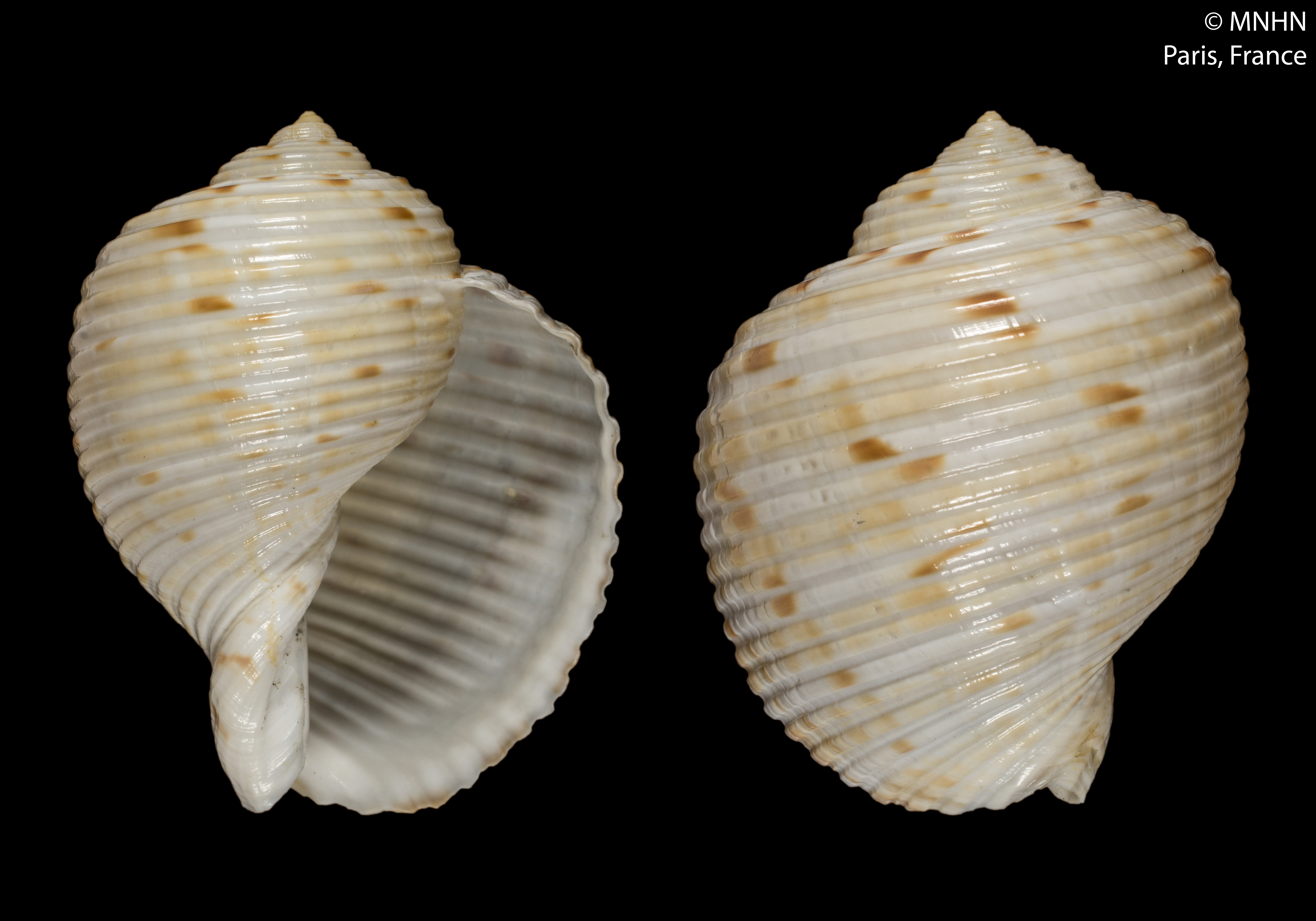
- Shell ofTonna boucheti (holotype at MNHN, Paris)

Scientific classification
- Kingdom: Animalia
- Phylum: Mollusca
- Class: Gastropoda
- Subclass: Caenogastropoda
- Order: Littorinimorpha
- Family: Tonnidae
- Genus: Tonna
- Species: T. boucheti

Binomial name
- Tonna boucheti Vos, 2005

Synonyms
- Tonna chinensis Zhang & Ma, 2004

= Tonna boucheti =

Species of gastropod

Tonna boucheti is a species of large sea snail, a marine gastropod mollusk in the family Tonnidae, the tun shells.

== Description ==
The size of an adult shell varies between 60 and 81 mm (2.4 and 3.2 in).

== Distribution ==
This species occurs in the Pacific Ocean off Taiwan.
