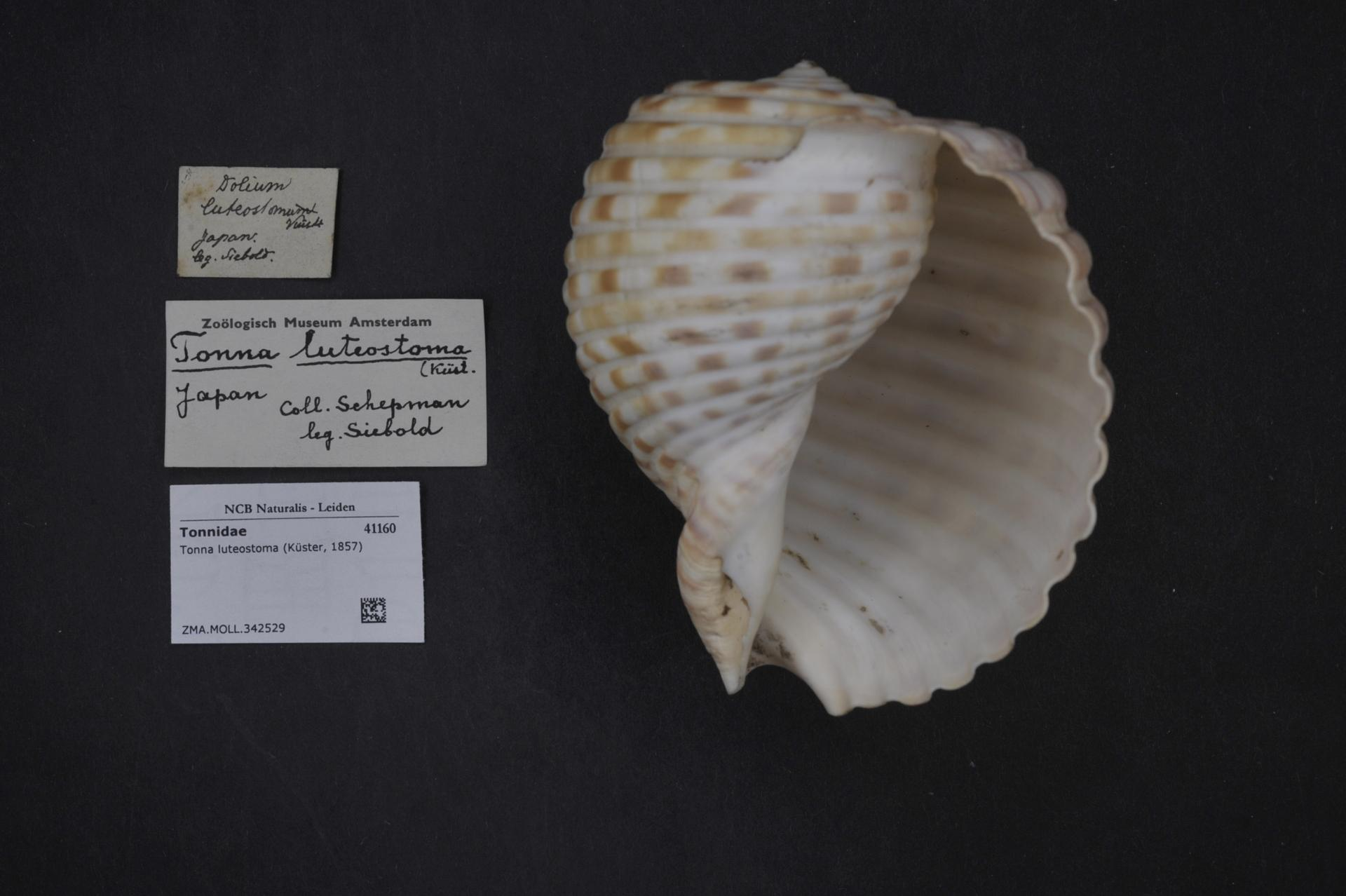

Scientific classification
- Kingdom: Animalia
- Phylum: Mollusca
- Class: Gastropoda
- Subclass: Caenogastropoda
- Order: Littorinimorpha
- Family: Tonnidae
- Genus: Tonna
- Species: T. luteostoma

Binomial name
- Tonna luteostoma (Küster, 1857)

Synonyms
- Dolium luteostomum Küster, 1857

= Tonna luteostoma =

Species of gastropod

Tonna luteostoma is a species of large sea snail, a marine gastropod mollusc in the family Tonnidae, the tun snails or tun shells. The species typically grows to a height of 100mm, width 85mm.

== Taxonomy ==
The accepted name Tonna luteostoma was proposed by Küster in 1857.

== Distribution ==
Tonna luteostoma can be found across Japan, where they are common. From 1976, the species began to appear in New Zealand waters, specifically in the Far North Aupourian geographical range.
