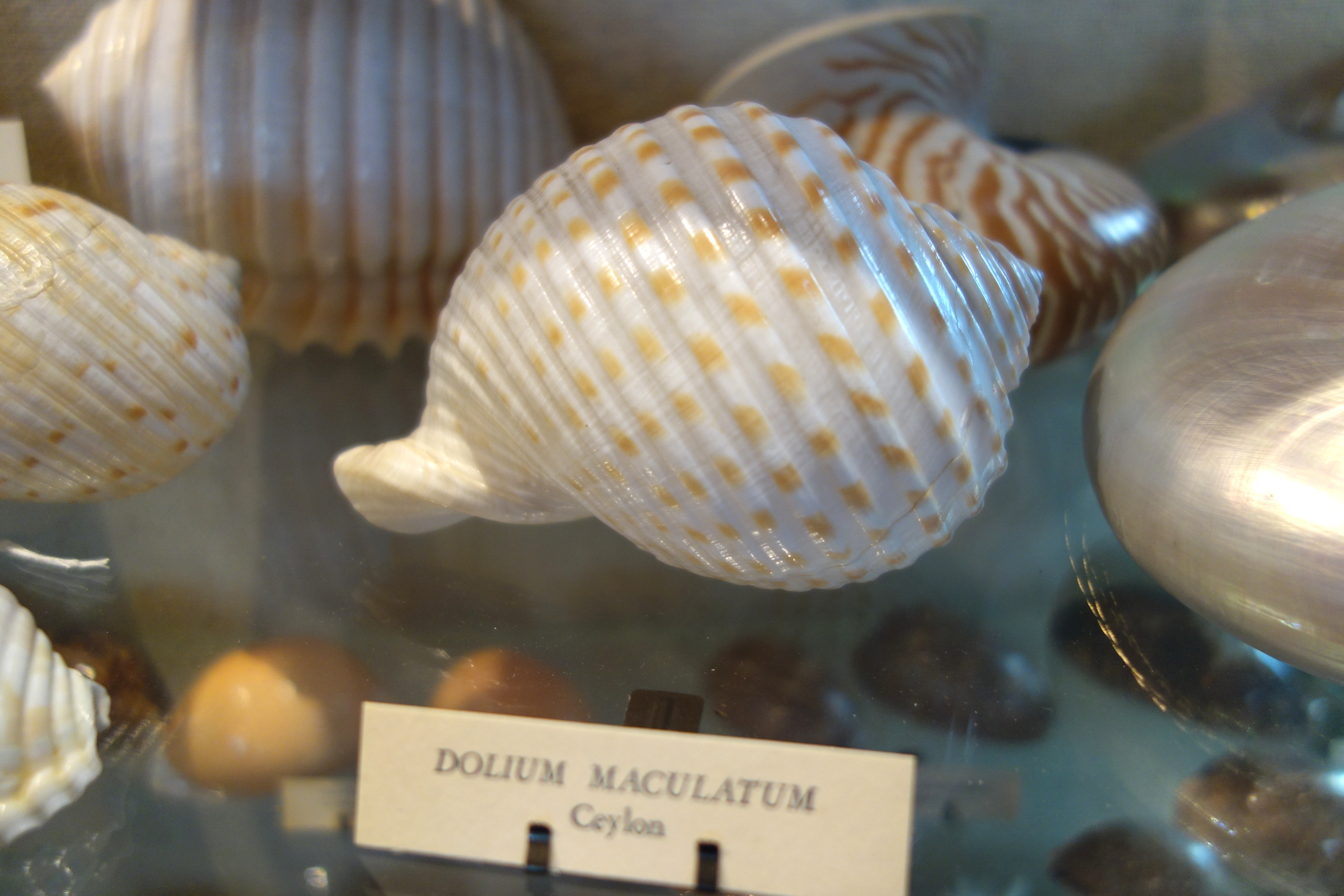

Scientific classification
- Kingdom: Animalia
- Phylum: Mollusca
- Class: Gastropoda
- Subclass: Caenogastropoda
- Order: Littorinimorpha
- Family: Tonnidae
- Genus: Tonna
- Species: T. dolium

Binomial name
- Tonna dolium (Lamarck, 1822)

Synonyms
- Buccinum dolium Linnaeus, 1758 (original combination); Cadium dolium (Linnaeus, 1758) (Recombined in synonymous genus); Cadus cassis Röding, 1798; Cadus dolium Röding, 1798 (Recombined in synonymous genus); Dolium (Dolium) maculatum (Lamarck, 1822) (Recombination of synonym); Dolium cassis (Röding, 1798) (Recombination of synonym); Dolium costatum var. maculatum Lamarck, 1822; Dolium maculatum Lamarck, 1822; Dolium maculatum Schröter in Martini, 1788 (Synonym - Unavailable under Direction 1 as index to non-binomial work); Tonna (Tonna) maculata (Lamarck, 1822) (Recombination of synonym)

= Tonna dolium =

Spotted tun

Species of gastropod

Tonna dolium, common name the spotted tun, is a species of large sea snail or tun snail, a marine gastropod mollusc in the family Tonnidae, the tun shells.

== Description ==
The size of the shell varies between 100 mm and 181 mm.

The thin shell is ovate-globose and ventricose. The spire is generally short. It is composed of six whorls, slightly flattened above. The body whorl is large and very convex. All these whorls are encircled by wide and distant ribs, slightly convex, numbering ten upon the body whorl. Others, more narrow, are placed alternately within the furrows, which are wide and very slightly striated. The surface of this shell is of a white color, slightly grayish, and sometimes rose-colored. It is ornamented upon the ribs, with alternate white and red spots, often also orange, which, disposed thus in regular series, present a beautiful appearance. The aperture is very large, colored within of a chestnut tint. The outer lip is thin, notched, canaliculated within, and its edge is white and undulated. The inner lip is only slightly perceptible towards the base, where it forms a part of the umbilicus, which is hardly developed. The columella is twisted spirally, and furnished externally, even to the emargination of the base, with longitudinal ribs.

Its ribs, wide and distant, its furrows equally wide, render it easily distinguishable.

== Distribution ==
This marine species occurs in the Indo-West Pacific off Tanzania, the Mascarene Basin and off the Philippines.
