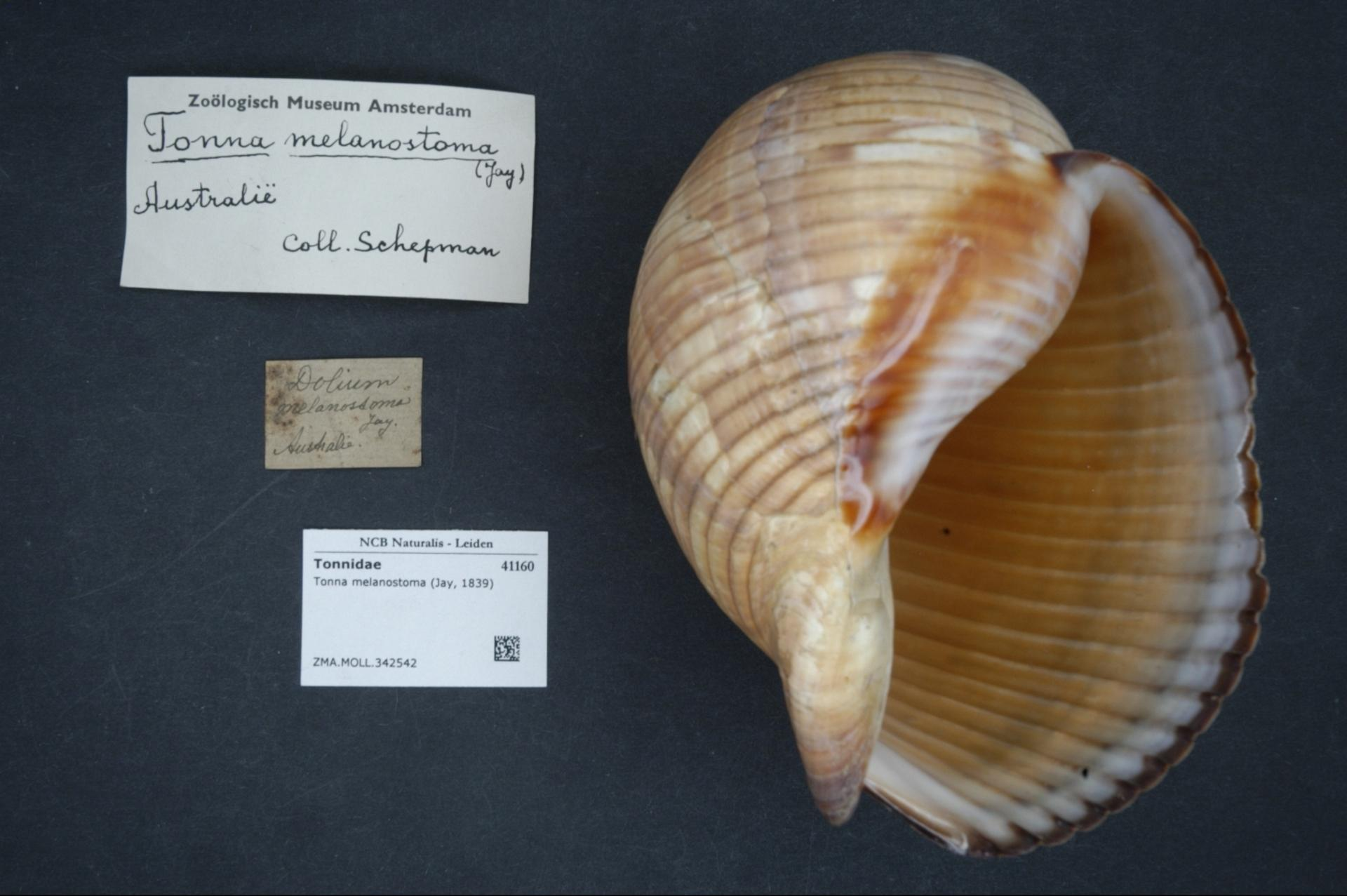

Scientific classification
- Kingdom: Animalia
- Phylum: Mollusca
- Class: Gastropoda
- Subclass: Caenogastropoda
- Order: Littorinimorpha
- Family: Tonnidae
- Genus: Tonna
- Species: T. melanostoma

Binomial name
- Tonna melanostoma (Jay, 1839)

Synonyms
- Dolium melanostoma Jay, 1839

= Tonna melanostoma =

Species of gastropod

Tonna melanostoma is a species of large sea snail, a marine gastropod mollusc in the family Tonnidae, the tun shells.

== Distribution ==
This species occurs off New Zealand
