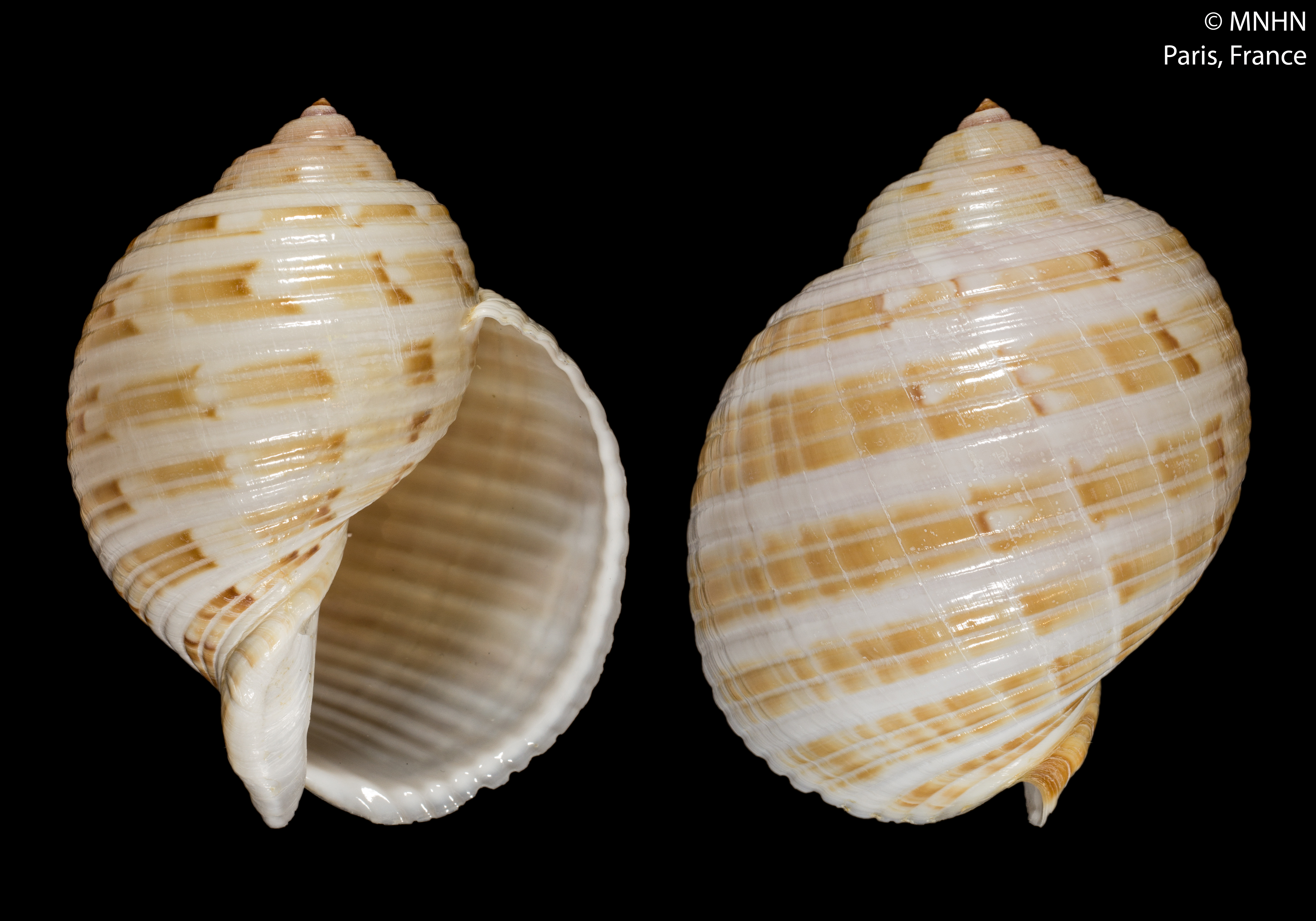
- Shell of Tonna oentoengi (holotype at MNHN, Paris)

Scientific classification
- Kingdom: Animalia
- Phylum: Mollusca
- Class: Gastropoda
- Subclass: Caenogastropoda
- Order: Littorinimorpha
- Family: Tonnidae
- Genus: Tonna
- Species: T. oentoengi

Binomial name
- Tonna oentoengi Vos, 2005

Synonyms
- Tonna oentoengi Dharma, 2005

= Tonna oentoengi =

Species of gastropod

Tonna oentoengi is a species of large sea snail, a marine gastropod mollusk in the family Tonnidae, also known as tun shells.

== Description ==
The length of the shell attains 110 mm.

== Distribution ==
This marine species occurs in the Arafura Sea.
