= Tonna hawaiiensis =

Scientific classification
- Kingdom: Animalia
- Phylum: Mollusca
- Class: Gastropoda
- Subclass: Caenogastropoda
- Order: Littorinimorpha
- Family: Tonnidae
- Genus: Tonna
- Species: T. hawaiiensis

Binomial name
- Tonna hawaiiensis Vos, 2007

Species of gastropod

Tonna hawaiiensis is a species of large sea snail, a marine gastropod mollusk in the family Tonnidae, the tun shells.
