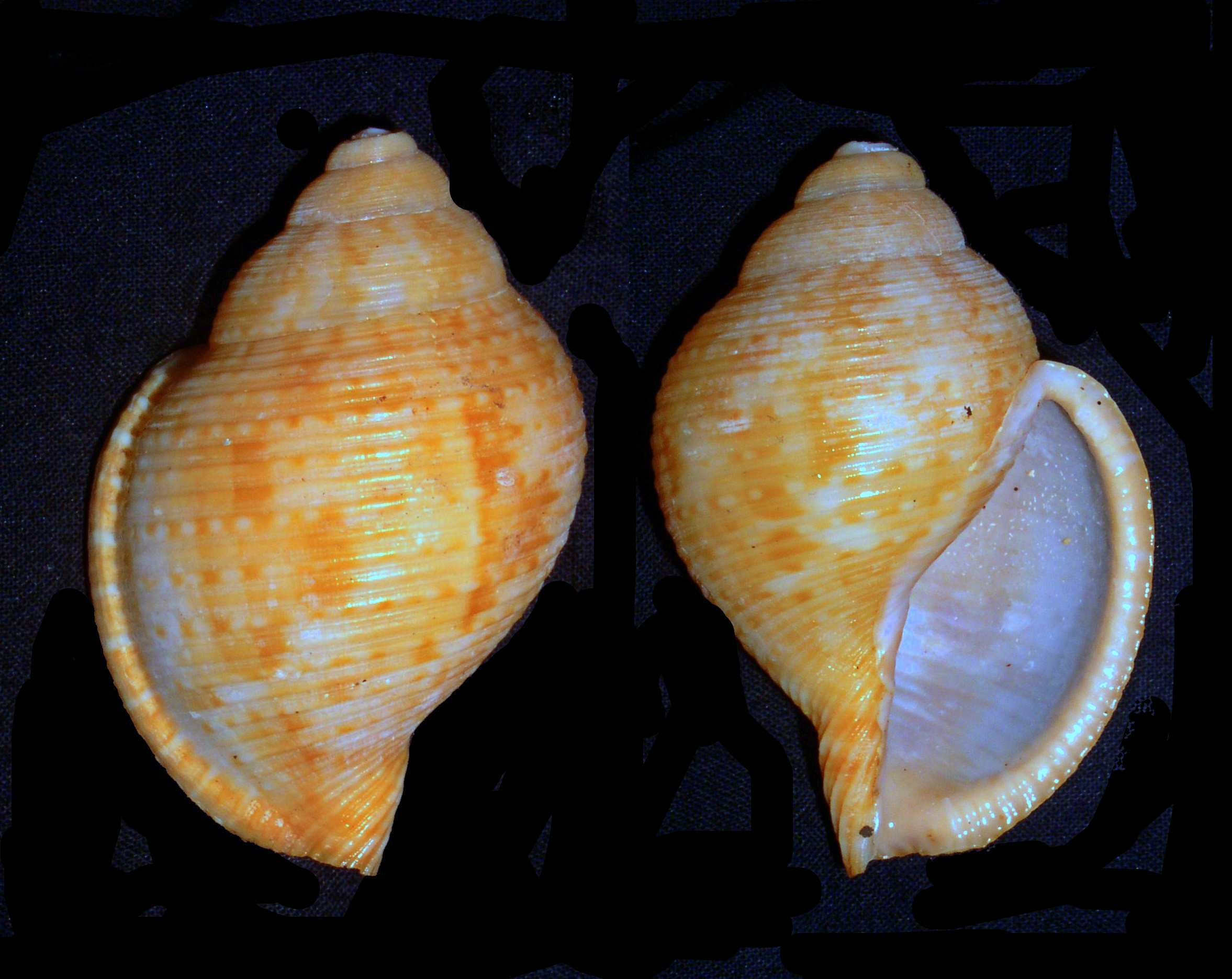
- Two views of a shell of Tonna allium

Scientific classification
- Kingdom: Animalia
- Phylum: Mollusca
- Class: Gastropoda
- Subclass: Caenogastropoda
- Order: Littorinimorpha
- Family: Tonnidae
- Genus: Tonna
- Species: T. allium

Binomial name
- Tonna allium (Dillwyn, 1817)

Synonyms
- Buccinum allium Dillwyn, 1817; Buccinum latescens Schröter in Martini, 1788; Cadus albus Röding, 1798; Dolium (Dolium) costatum Menke, 1828 superseded combination; Dolium (Dolium) costatum var. picta Hanley, 1860 superseded combination; Dolium (Dolium) dolium var. natalensis E. A. Smith, 1906; Dolium costatum Menke, 1828; Dolium costatum Deshayes, 1844 (invalid: junior homonym of Dolium costatum Menke, 1828); † Dolium costatum martini O. Boettger, 1883 superseded combination; † Dolium costatum var. martini O. Boettger, 1883; Dolium fasciatum Bruguière, 1789; Dolium fasciatum var. Kiener, 1835 non Buccinum fasciatum Bruguière, 1789; Dolium fimbriatum var. natalensis E. A. Smith, 1906; Dolium hochstetteri K. Martin, 1879 † · unaccepted > junior subjective synonym; Dolium lactescens Martini, 1777 (Unavailable under Dir. 1.); Dolium latescens Schröter, 1788; Dolium latesulcatum Hanley, 1860; Dolium latesulcatum var. picta Hanley, 1860; Dolium natalensis Bartsch, 1915; Tonna (Tonna) costata (Menke, 1828) > superseded combination; Tonna (Tonna) dolium natalensis (E. A. Smith, 1906) superseded combination; † Tonna (Tonna) hochstetteri (K. Martin, 1879); Tonna costata Tonna hardyi Bozzetti & Ferrario, 2005; Tonna fimbriata (G. B. Sowerby I, 1827) (Recombination); Tonna hardyi Bozzetti & Ferrario, 2005

= Tonna allium =

Costate tun

Species of gastropod

Tonna allium, common name the costate tun, is a species of large sea snail, a marine gastropod mollusk in the family Tonnidae, the tun shells.

== Description ==
The length of an adult shell varies between 50 mm and 131 mm.

== Distribution ==
This species occurs in the Indian Ocean off Madagascar, the Mascarene Basin and Mauritius.
