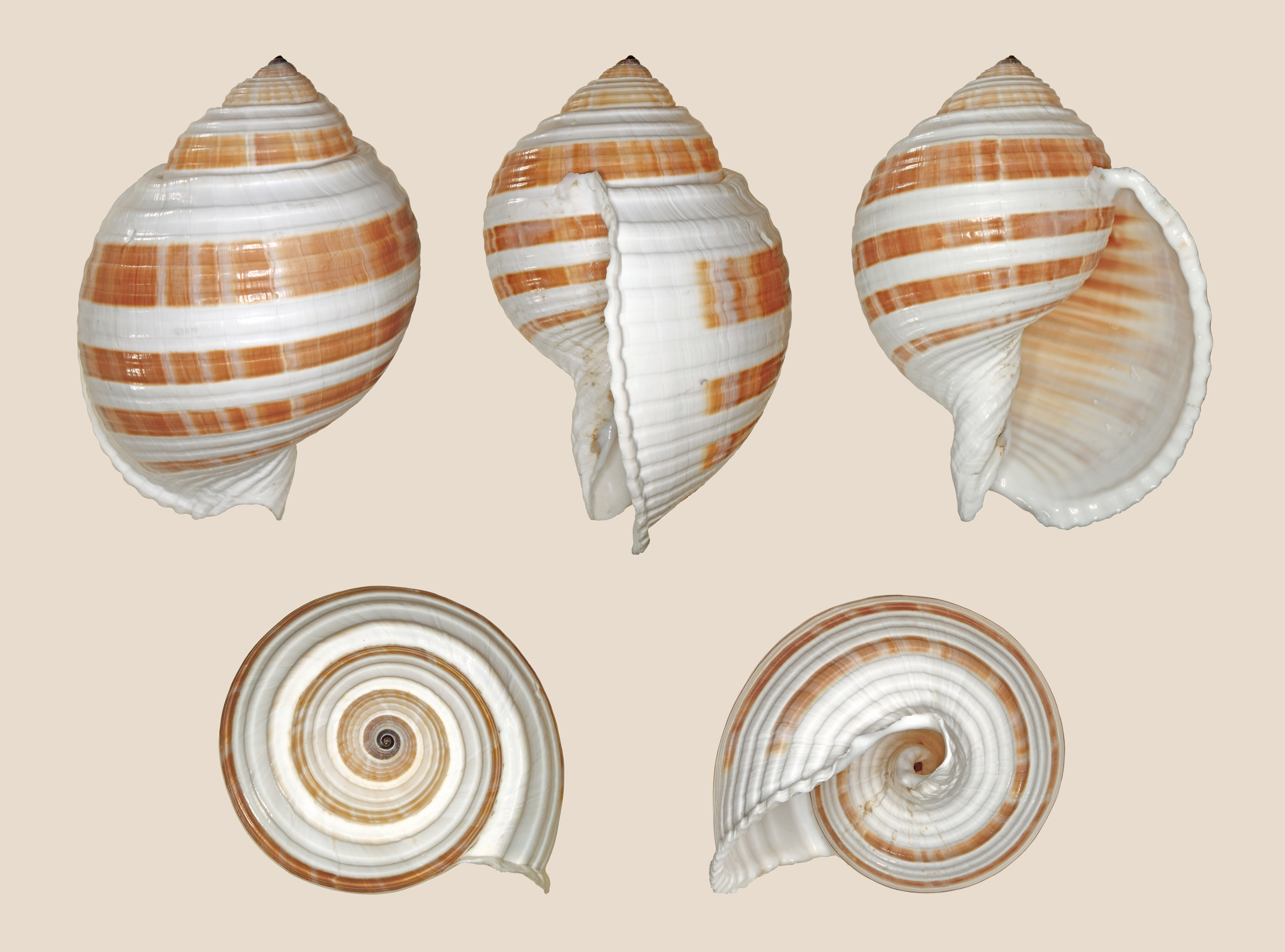
- Five views of a shell of Tonna sulcosa

Scientific classification
- Kingdom: Animalia
- Phylum: Mollusca
- Class: Gastropoda
- Subclass: Caenogastropoda
- Order: Littorinimorpha
- Family: Tonnidae
- Genus: Tonna
- Species: T. sulcosa

Binomial name
- Tonna sulcosa (Born, 1778)

Synonyms
- Buccinum fasciatum Bruguière, 1789; Buccinum fasciatum Martini, 1777; Buccinum sulcosum Born, 1778 (original combination); Cadus diaphanus Röding, 1798; Cadus fasciatus Röding, 1798; Dolium (Dolium) fasciatum (Martini, 1777) (Recombination of synonym); Dolium (Dolium) varicosum Preston, 1910; Dolium (Eudolium) fasciatum Martini, 1777 (Unavailable under Dir. 1.); Dolium fasciatum Martini, 1777 (Unavailable under Direction 1 as published in non-binominal work); Dolium varicosum Preston, 1910; Tonna (Tonna) fasciata (Martini, 1777) (Recombination of synonym); Tonna (Tonna) varicosa (Preston, 1910) (Recombination of synonym); Tonna fasciata (Martini, 1777) (Recombination of synonym); † Tonna niasensis Wissema, 1947

= Tonna sulcosa =

Species of gastropod

Tonna sulcosa, common name banded tun, is a species of large sea snail, a marine gastropod mollusk in the family Tonnidae, the tun shells.

== Description ==
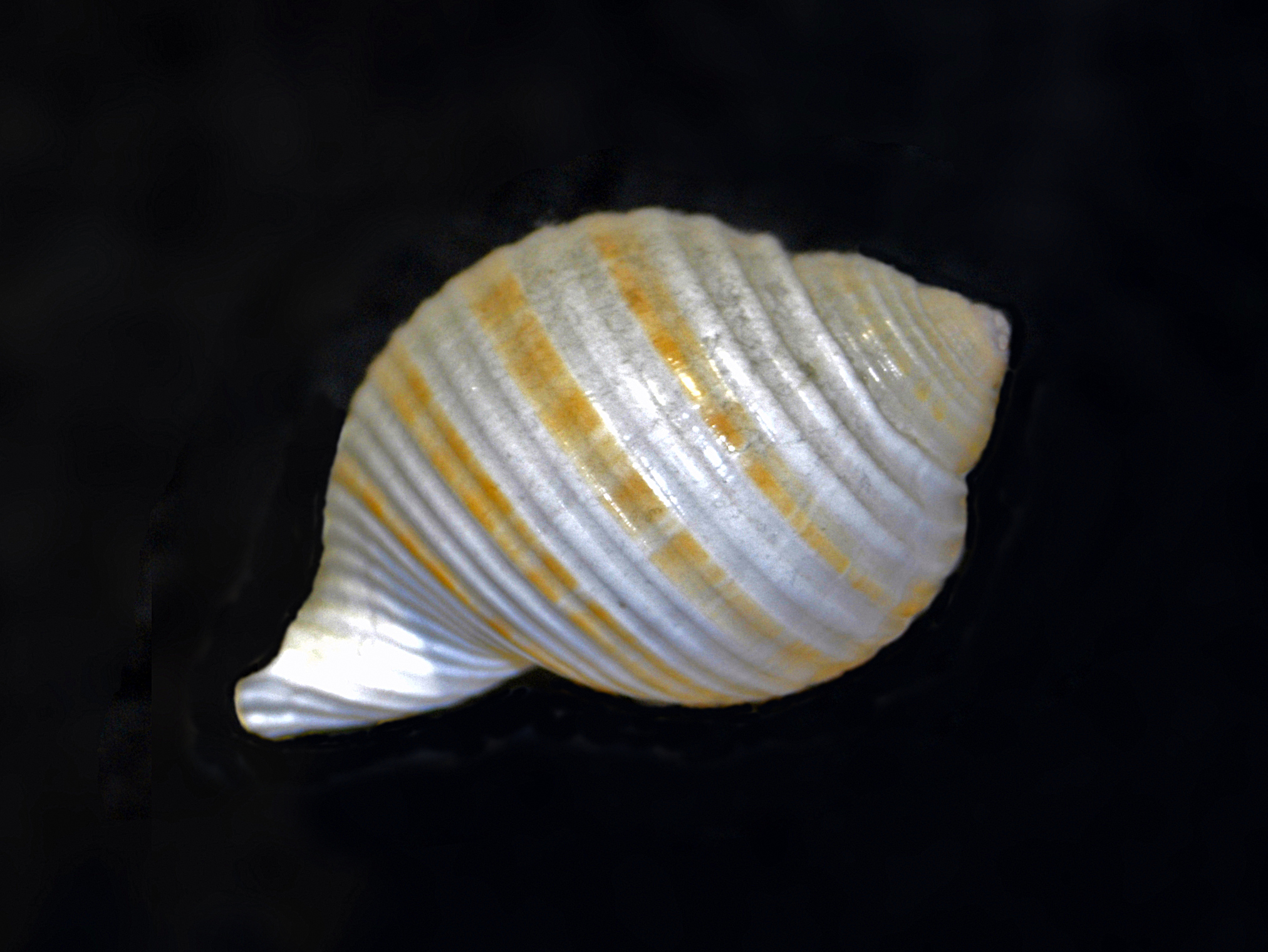
A shell of Tonna sulcosa

Shells of Tonna sulcosa usually can reach a length of 50–125 millimetres (2.0–4.9 in), with a maximum of 153 millimetres (6.0 in). These medium-sized shells are quite strong, oval-globose, with 4 -5 moderately convex turns and flat ridges. The aperture is large, semi-circular, with reflected lip and long, sharp teeth.

The shell surface is white with 3 - 5 wide brown bands.

Thin shell is ovate and ventricose. Its ground color is whitish, with four or five distinct bands of a reddish fawn-color, rarely continued to the outer lip. There is only one upon the two whorls next above the lowest. The spire is brown at top, and is formed of six convex whorls, encircled by projecting, pretty narrow, equal, approximate, flattened ribs, a little more distant towards the upper part..They are separated by shallow furrows. Two of the upper whorls are chequered as it were by intersections of striae. The suture is a little flattened, and slightly channeled. The ovate aperture is white, colored with red at the bottom. The outer lip is arcuated, and presents externally a projecting margin, which is crenulated outwardly by the jutting of the ribs, undulated externally, and dentated within. The columella is twisted. And upon some specimens are observed several crenulations towards the base of the inner lip which partially covers the umbilicus. The periostracum is thin and reddish.

== Distribution ==
This species is widespread in the tropical Indo-West Pacific region - from the Red Sea and the Indian Ocean to the Indo-China, the Philippines and Australia (Queensland and Western Australia).

== Habitat ==
These benthic gastropods live on sandy bottoms in tropical environment at depths of 10 to 70 m.

== Life cycle ==
Embryos develop into free-swimming planktonic marine larvae (trochophore) and later into juvenile veligers.

== Bibliography ==
- Vos, C. (2007) A conchological Iconography (No. 13) - The family Tonnidae. 123 pp.,
- G. T. Poppe - Philippine Marine Molluscs Vol. 1, p 106
- Alan G. Hinton - Shells of New Guinea & Central Pacific
- R. Tucker Abbott - Seashells of South East Asia
- Cornelis Swennen and Robert Moolenbeek - The Molluscs of the southern Gulf of Thailand
- B. Dharma - Indonesian Shells I
- Hedley, C. 1919. A review of the Australian Tun Shells. Records of the Australian Museum 12(11): 329-336, pls 39-44
- Hinton, A.G. 1978. Guide to Australian Shells. Port Moresby : Robert Brown & Associates 82 pp.
- Wilson, B. 1993. Australian Marine Shells. Prosobranch Gastropods. Kallaroo, Western Australia : Odyssey Publishing Vol. 1 408 pp.
- Wilson, B. 2002. A handbook to Australian seashells on seashores east to west and north to south. Sydney : Reed New Holland 185 pp.
