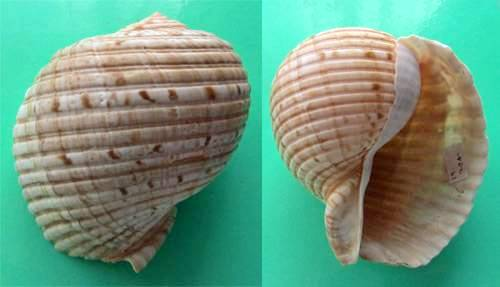

Scientific classification
- Kingdom: Animalia
- Phylum: Mollusca
- Class: Gastropoda
- Subclass: Caenogastropoda
- Order: Littorinimorpha
- Family: Tonnidae
- Genus: Tonna
- Species: T. berthae

Binomial name
- Tonna berthae Vos, 2005

= Tonna berthae =

Species of gastropod

Tonna berthae is a species of large sea snail or tun snail, a marine gastropod mollusc in the family Tonnidae, the tun shells.

== Distribution ==
This species is endemic to South Africa.

== Shell description ==
The shell height is up to about 90 mm.
