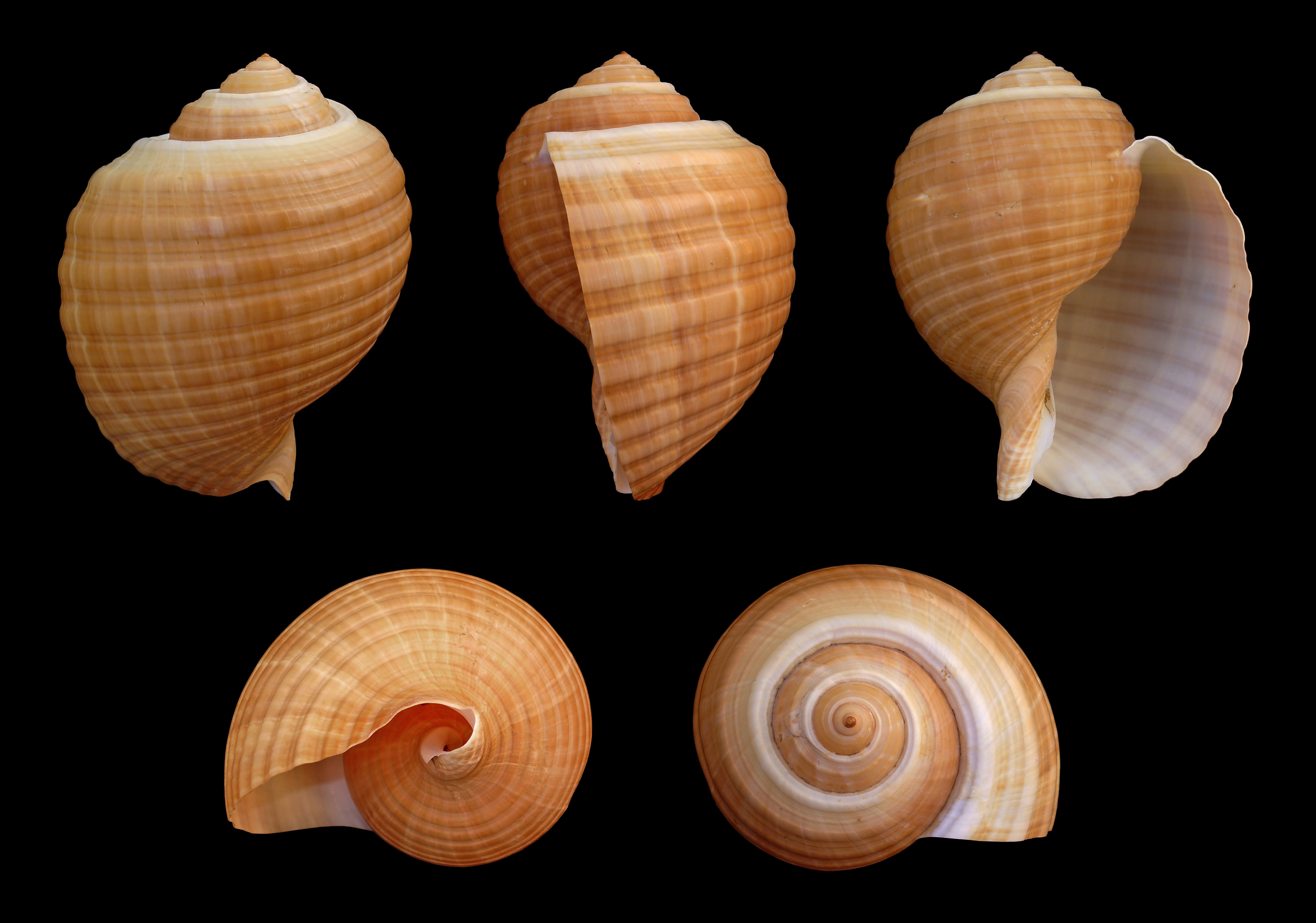
- Five views of a shell of Tonna galea

Scientific classification
- Kingdom: Animalia
- Phylum: Mollusca
- Class: Gastropoda
- Subclass: Caenogastropoda
- Order: Littorinimorpha
- Family: Tonnidae
- Genus: Tonna; Brunnich, 1772

Type species
- Buccinum galea Linnaeus, 1758

Species
- See text

Synonyms
- Cadium Link, 1807; Cadus Röding, 1798; Dolium Lamarck, 1801; Dolium (Dolium) Lamarck, 1801 (Recombination as subgenus); Foratidolium Rovereto, 1899 (Replacement name for Perdix Montfort, 1810 (non Brisson, 1760)); Macgillivrayia Forbes, 1852; Parvitonna Iredale, 1931; Perdix Montfort, 1810 (Invalid: junior homonym of Perdix Brisson, 1760 [Aves]; Foratidolium is a replacement name); Tonna (Tonna) Brünnich, 1771 (Recombination as subgenus)

= Tonna (gastropod) =

Genus of gastropods

Tonna is a genus of large sea snails, marine gastropod molluscs in the family Tonnidae, the tun or cask shells.

== Description ==
The thin shell is ventricose, inflated, generally globular, rarely oblong, and encircled with ribs. The spire is short. The outer lip is crenulated and sometimes denticulated throughout its whole length. The oblong aperture is very large and emarginated inferiorly. The columella is channeled. There is no operculum.

The animal is very large, so as scarcely to be contained within its shell. The head is broad and swollen anteriorly, supporting two long, slender, obtuse, distant tentacles, dilated towards the base, where the eyes are situated. The mouth is large, muscular, strong, and retractile. The respiratory tube is pretty stout. Its cavity is large, entirely open, provided with two branchiae placed on the left side, the larger of which forms a large semicircle. The trunk is cylindrical, very much developed, flexible, capable of being turned in every direction at the will of the animal, and of elongating itself in a remarkable manner. It is furnished internally with several rows of hooks. The foot is ovate, large, and fleshy, bordering all parts of the shell. It is rounded, widened, lobed, and dilated anteriorly, with a horizontal furrow. The posterior extremity has no trace of an operculum. The reproductive organ of the male is very retractile.

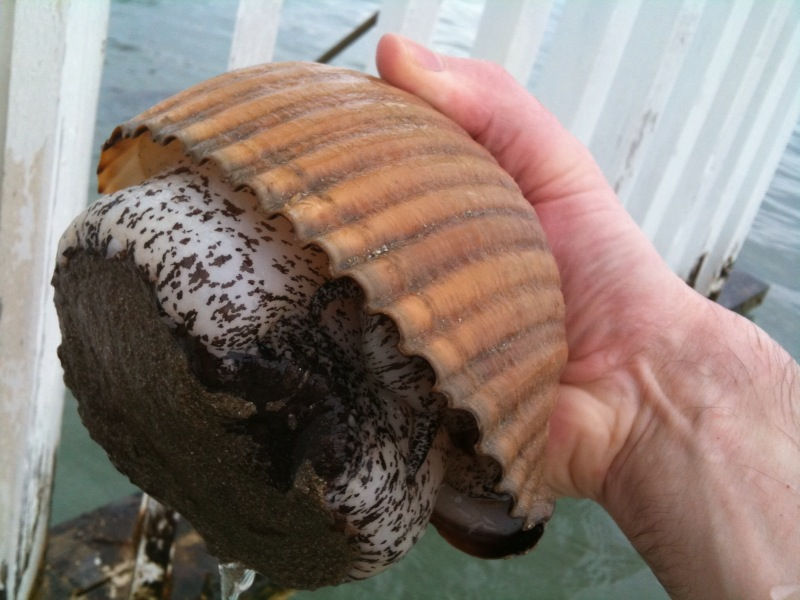
Anterior view of a live Tonna galea held in a human hand

The genus Tonna comprehends a small number of species, some of which attain so remarkable a growth that they are sometimes as large as a man's head. The general appearance of the shell, of an inflated, thick-set form, calls up the image of a tun, whence is derived its generic name. Thus, the characters which make up these species are a form more or less inflated, girdled, and very globular. The spire is much shorter than the body whorl. This causes the size of the aperture, which almost always occupies two-thirds of the length of the shell.

The animals of the tuns are in general strongly colored, and painted with different tints which form bands and spottings upon their entire exterior.

== Distribution ==
This marine genus is cosmopolitan.

== Species ==
Species within the genus Tonna include:

- Tonna alanbeui Vos, 2005
- Tonna allium (Dillwyn, 1817)
- Tonna ampullacea (Philippi, 1845)
- Tonna berthae Vos, 2005
- Tonna boucheti Vos, 2005
- Tonna bozzettii T. Cossignani, 2021
- Tonna canaliculata (Linnaeus, 1758)
- Tonna chinensis Dillwyn, 1817
- Tonna cumingii (Hanley in Reeve, 1849)
- Tonna deshayesii (Reeve, 1849)
- Tonna dolium (Linnaeus, 1758)
- Tonna dunkeri (Hanley, 1860)
- Tonna galea (Linnaeus, 1758)
- Tonna hawaiiensis Vos, 2007
- Tonna lischkeana (Küster, 1857)
- Tonna luteostoma (Küster, 1857)
- Tonna melanostoma (Jay, 1839)
- Tonna morrisoni Vos, 2005
- Tonna oentoengi Vos, 2005
- Tonna pennata (Mörch, 1853)
- Tonna perdix (Linnaeus, 1758)
- Tonna poppei Vos, 2005
- Tonna rosemaryae Vos, 1999
- Tonna sulcosa (Born, 1778)
- Tonna tankervillii (Hanley, 1860)
- Tonna tenebrosa (Hanley, 1860)
- Tonna tessellata (Lamarck, 1816)
- Tonna tetracotula Hedley, 1919
- Tonna variegata (Lamarck, 1822)
- Tonna zonata (Green, 1830)

Species brought into synonymy

- Tonna cepa (Röding, 1798): synonym of Tonna canaliculata (Linnaeus, 1758)
- Tonna cerevisina Hedley, 1919: synonym of Tonna tankervillii (Hanley, 1860)
- Tonna chinensis Hinton, 1972: synonym of Tonna alanbeui (Vos, 2005)
- Tonna chinensis Zhang & Ma, 2004: synonym of Tonna boucheti (Vos, 2005)
- Tonna cimingii Hinton, 1974 : synonym of Tonna poppei (Vos, 2005)
- Tonna costata : synonym of Tonna allium (Dillwyn, 1817)
- Tonna fasciata (Martini, 1777): synonym of Tonna sulcosa (Born, 1778)
- Tonna fimbriata (G. B. Sowerby I, 1827): synonym of Tonna allium (Dillwyn, 1817)
- Tonna hardyi Bozzetti & Ferrario, 2005 : synonym of Tonna allium (Dillwyn, 1817)
- Tonna haurakiensis (Hedley, 1919): synonym of Tonna tankervillii (Hanley, 1860)
- Tonna maculata (Lamarck, 1822): synonym of Tonna dolium (Linnaeus, 1758)
- Tonna maculosa (Dillwyn, 1817): synonym of Tonna pennata (Mörch, 1853)
- Tonna maoria Powell, 1938 : synonym of Tonna cumingii (Hanley in Reeve, 1849)
- Tonna marginata (Philippi, 1845): synonym of Tonna lischkeana (Küster, 1857)
- Tonna niasensis Wissema, 1947 †: synonym of Tonna sulcosa (Born, 1778)
- Tonna olearium (Linnaeus, 1758): synonym of Tonna galea (Linnaeus, 1758)
- Tonna oentoengi Dharma, 2005 : synonym of Tonna oentoengi (Vos, 2005)
- Tonna parvula (Tapparone Canefri, 1878): synonym of Tonna tessellata (Lamarck, 1816)
- Tonna perdix Steyn & Steyn, 2002 : synonym of Tonna dunkeri (Hanley, 1860)
- Tonna planicostata Dodge, 1956: synonym of Tonna canaliculata (Linnaeus, 1758)
- Tonna pyriformis (G. B. Sowerby III, 1914): synonym of Eudolium crosseanum (Monterosato, 1869)
- Tonna variegata Kilburn, 1971 : synonym of Tonna dunkeri (Hanley, 1860)
- Tonna variegata Suter, 1913 : synonym of Tonna tankervillii (Hanley, 1860)
