= Tonna alanbeui =

Scientific classification
- Kingdom: Animalia
- Phylum: Mollusca
- Class: Gastropoda
- Subclass: Caenogastropoda
- Order: Littorinimorpha
- Family: Tonnidae
- Genus: Tonna
- Species: T. alanbeui

Binomial name
- Tonna alanbeui Vos, 2005

Synonyms
- Tonna chinensis Hinton, 1972

Species of gastropod

Tonna alanbeui is a species of large sea snail, a marine gastropod mollusk in the family Tonnidae, the tun shells.
