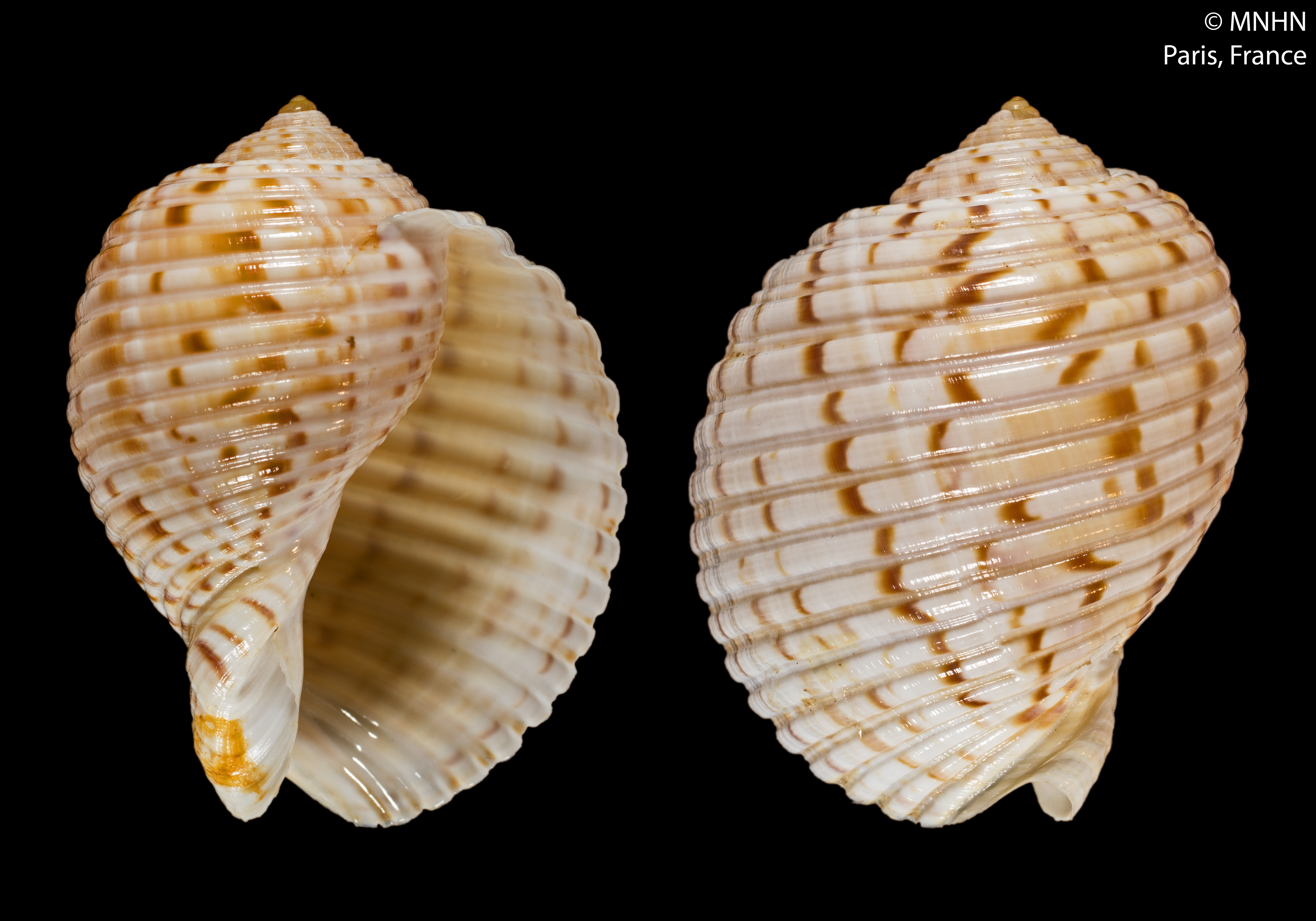
- Shell of Tonna morrisoni (holotype at MNHN, Paris)

Scientific classification
- Kingdom: Animalia
- Phylum: Mollusca
- Class: Gastropoda
- Subclass: Caenogastropoda
- Order: Littorinimorpha
- Family: Tonnidae
- Genus: Tonna
- Species: T. morrisoni

Binomial name
- Tonna morrisoni Vos, 2005

= Tonna morrisoni =

Species of gastropod

Tonna morrisoni is a species of large sea snail, a marine gastropod mollusk in the family Tonnidae, the tun shells.

== Description ==
The length of the shell attains 90 mm.

== Distribution ==
This marine species occurs off South Africa, Mozambique and Madagascar.
