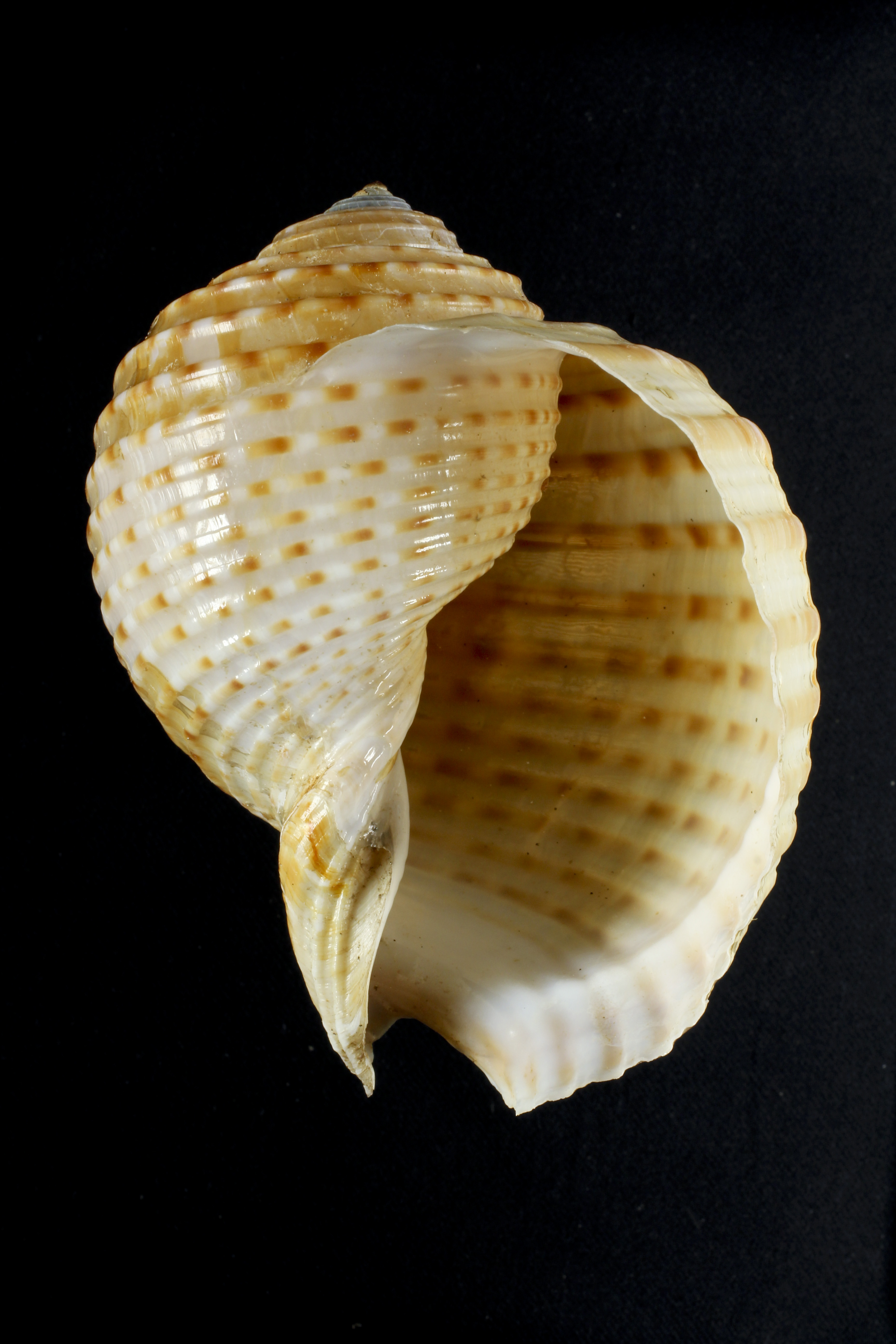
- Shell of Tonna lischkeana (specimen at MNHN, Paris)

Scientific classification
- Kingdom: Animalia
- Phylum: Mollusca
- Class: Gastropoda
- Subclass: Caenogastropoda
- Order: Littorinimorpha
- Family: Tonnidae
- Genus: Tonna
- Species: T. lischkeana

Binomial name
- Tonna lischkeana (Küster, 1857)

Synonyms
- Cadus globosus Röding, 1798 (nomen nudum); Dolium (Dolium) lischkeanum (Küster, 1857) · (Recombination); Dolium (Dolium) marginatum (Philippi, 1845)(Recombination of synonym); Dolium (Dolium) reevii Hanley, 1860; Dolium fimbriatum Reeve, 1848 not G. B. Sowerby I, 1827; Dolium lischkeanum Küster, 1857; Dolium marginatum Philippi, 1845; Dolium reevii Hanley, 1860; Tonna reevei G.W. Tryon, 1885; Tonna (Tonna) lischkeana (Küster, 1857) (Recombination); Tonna (Tonna) marginata (Philippi, 1845) (Recombination of synonym); Tonna marginata (Philippi, 1845) (Recombination of synonym)

= Tonna lischkeana =

Species of gastropod

Tonna lischkeana aalso known as Lischke's tun, is a species of large sea snail, a marine gastropod mollusk in the family Tonnidae, the tun shells.

== Description ==
The length of the shell attains 165 mm.

== Distribution ==
This marine species occurs off the ¨Philippines.
