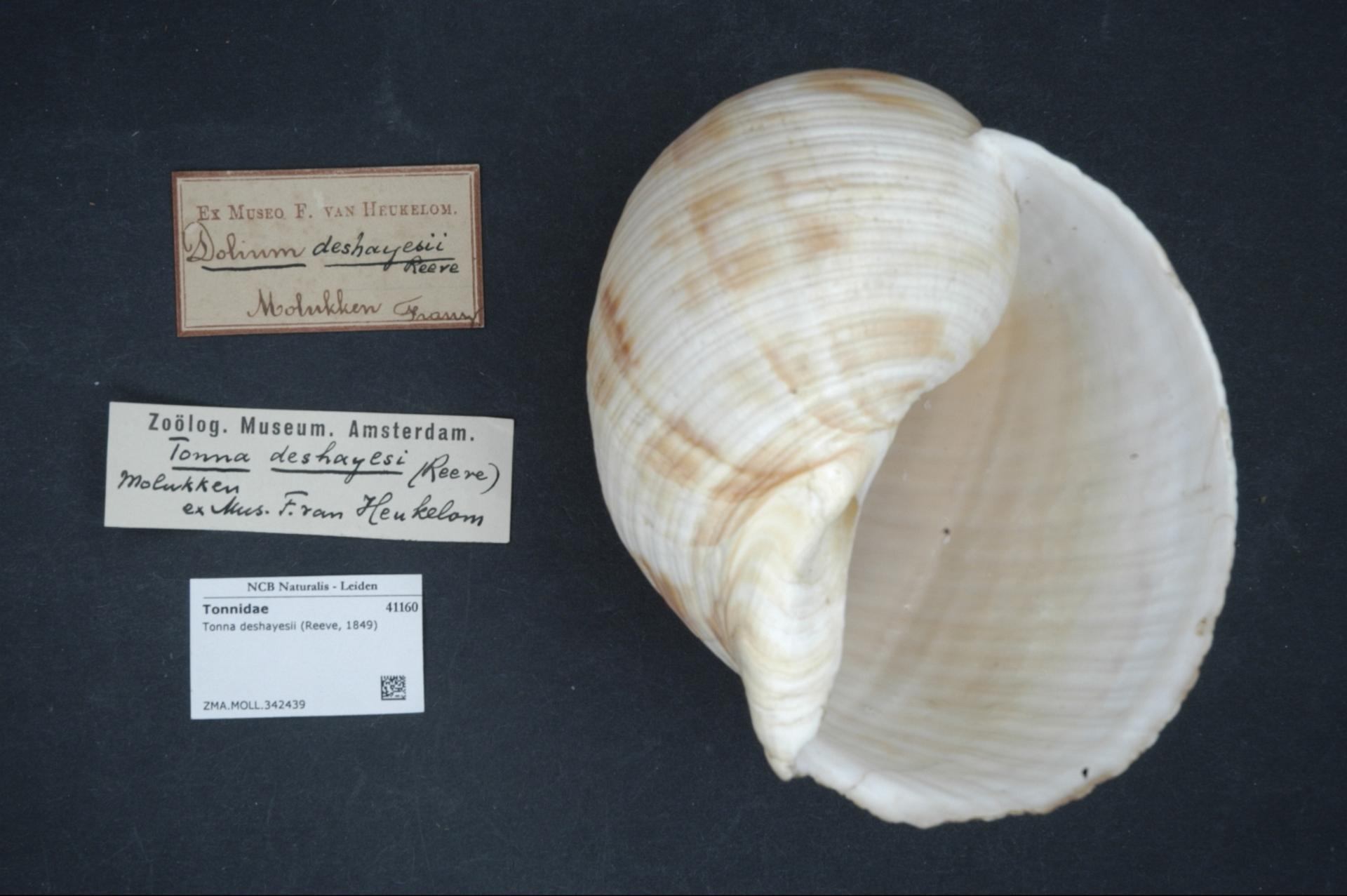
- Tonna deshayesii

Scientific classification
- Kingdom: Animalia
- Phylum: Mollusca
- Class: Gastropoda
- Subclass: Caenogastropoda
- Order: Littorinimorpha
- Family: Tonnidae
- Genus: Tonna
- Species: T. deshayesii

Binomial name
- Tonna deshayesii (Reeve, 1849)

Synonyms
- Dolium deshayesii Reeve, 1849

= Tonna deshayesii =

Species of gastropod

Tonna deshayesii is a species of large sea snail, a marine gastropod mollusk in the family Tonnidae, the tun shells.
