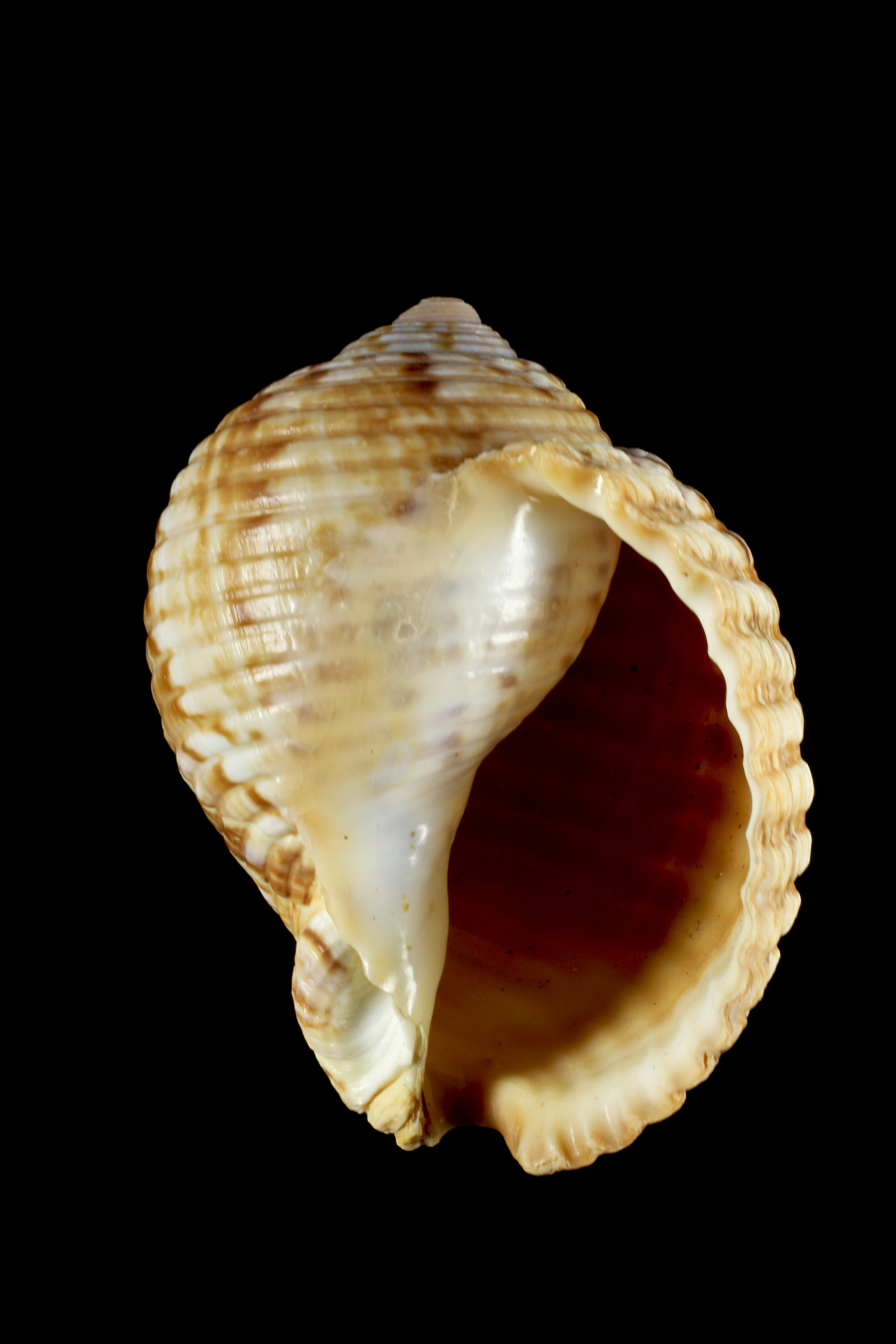
- Shell of Tonna dunkeri (specimen at MNHN, Paris)

Scientific classification
- Kingdom: Animalia
- Phylum: Mollusca
- Class: Gastropoda
- Subclass: Caenogastropoda
- Order: Littorinimorpha
- Family: Tonnidae
- Genus: Tonna
- Species: T. dunkeri

Binomial name
- Tonna dunkeri (Hanley, 1860)

Synonyms
- Dolium (Dolium) dunkeri (Hanley, 1860) (Unnecessary interpolation); Dolium dunkeri Hanley, 1860; Tonna perdix Steyn & Steyn, 2002; Tonna variegata Kilburn, 1971; Tonna variegata f. dunkeri Hanley, 1860

= Tonna dunkeri =

Species of gastropod

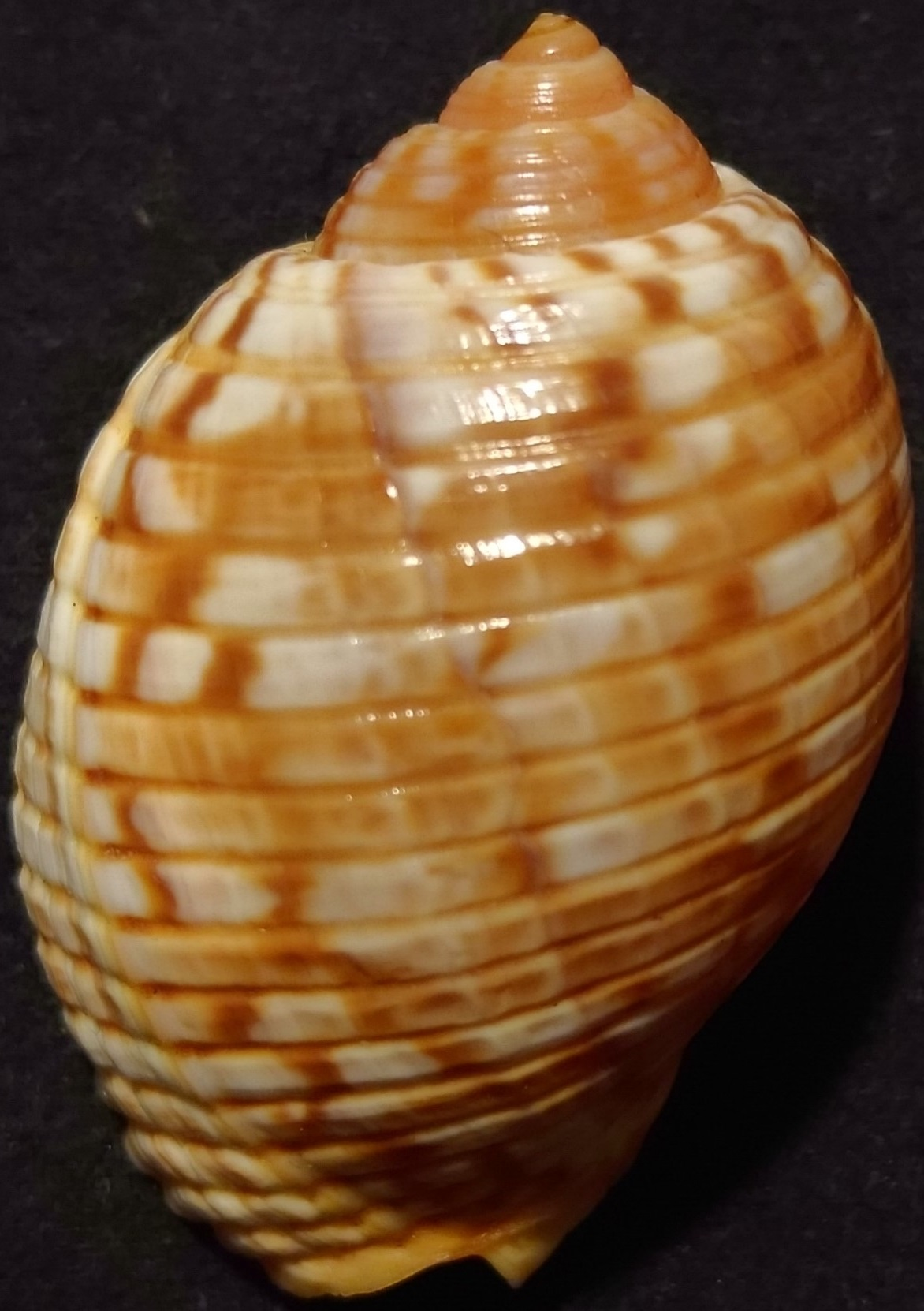

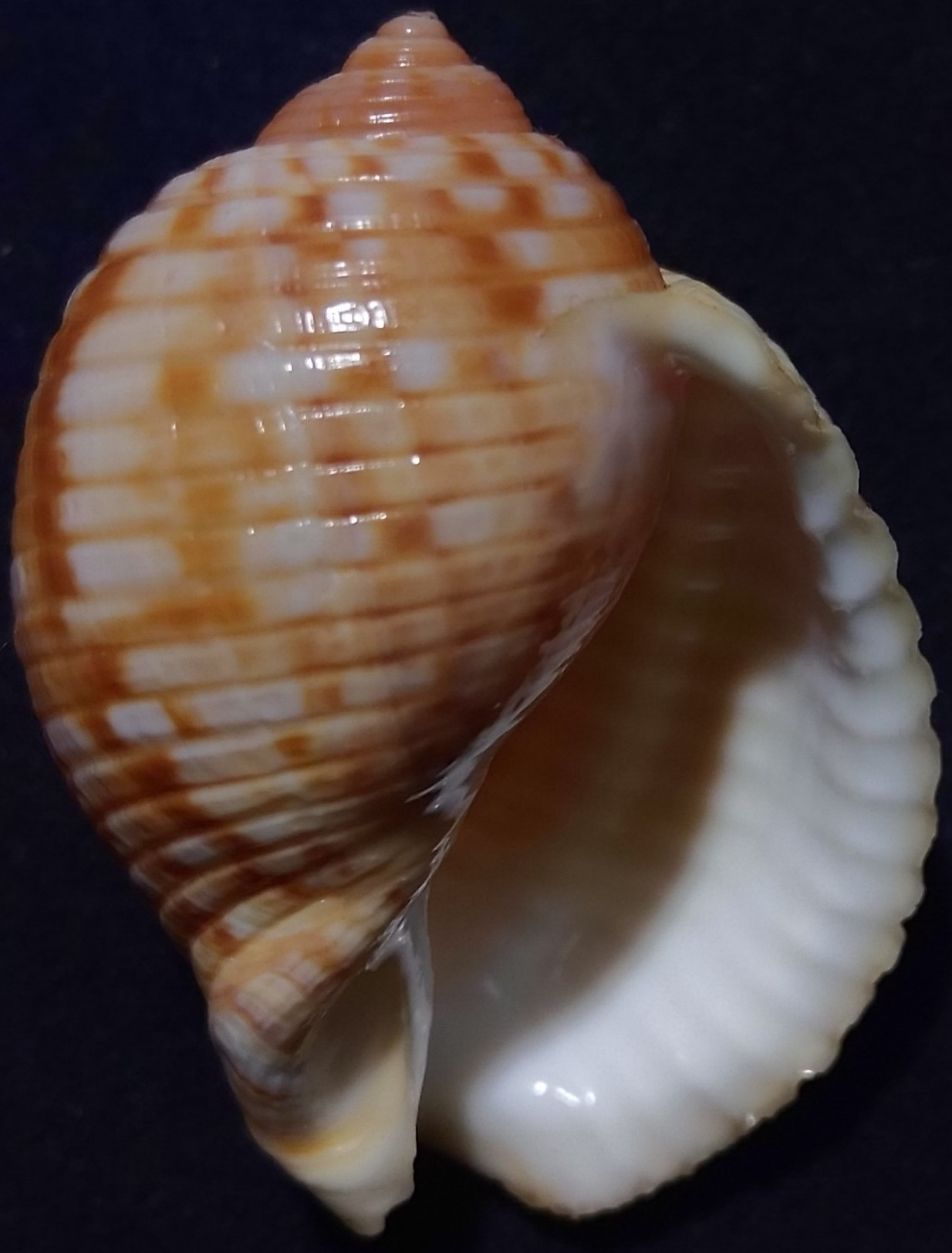

Tonna dunkeri, common name boxing glove, is a species of large sea snail, a marine gastropod mollusk in the family Tonnidae, the tun shells.

== Description ==
The length of the shell attains 125 mm.

The shell is moderate to large, fragile and globular in shape. It features a very large aperture and a low spire. The surface is sculpted with well-developed, broad, flat-topped spiral cords, and the base has a pronounced siphonal notch. Adult animals lack an operculum. This species is highly variable, with both shallow- and deep-water forms. On the Agulhas Bank, shells tend to be more globular, with a lower spire, a pronounced shoulder, and a slightly sunken suture.

The color of fresh shells is light brown to orange-brown. The ribs are marked with irregular white blotches, bordered by darker brown bars.

== Distribution ==
This marine species occurs off South Africa, off the Agulhas Bank and East coast at depths between 50 m and 100 m; also off Madagascar.
