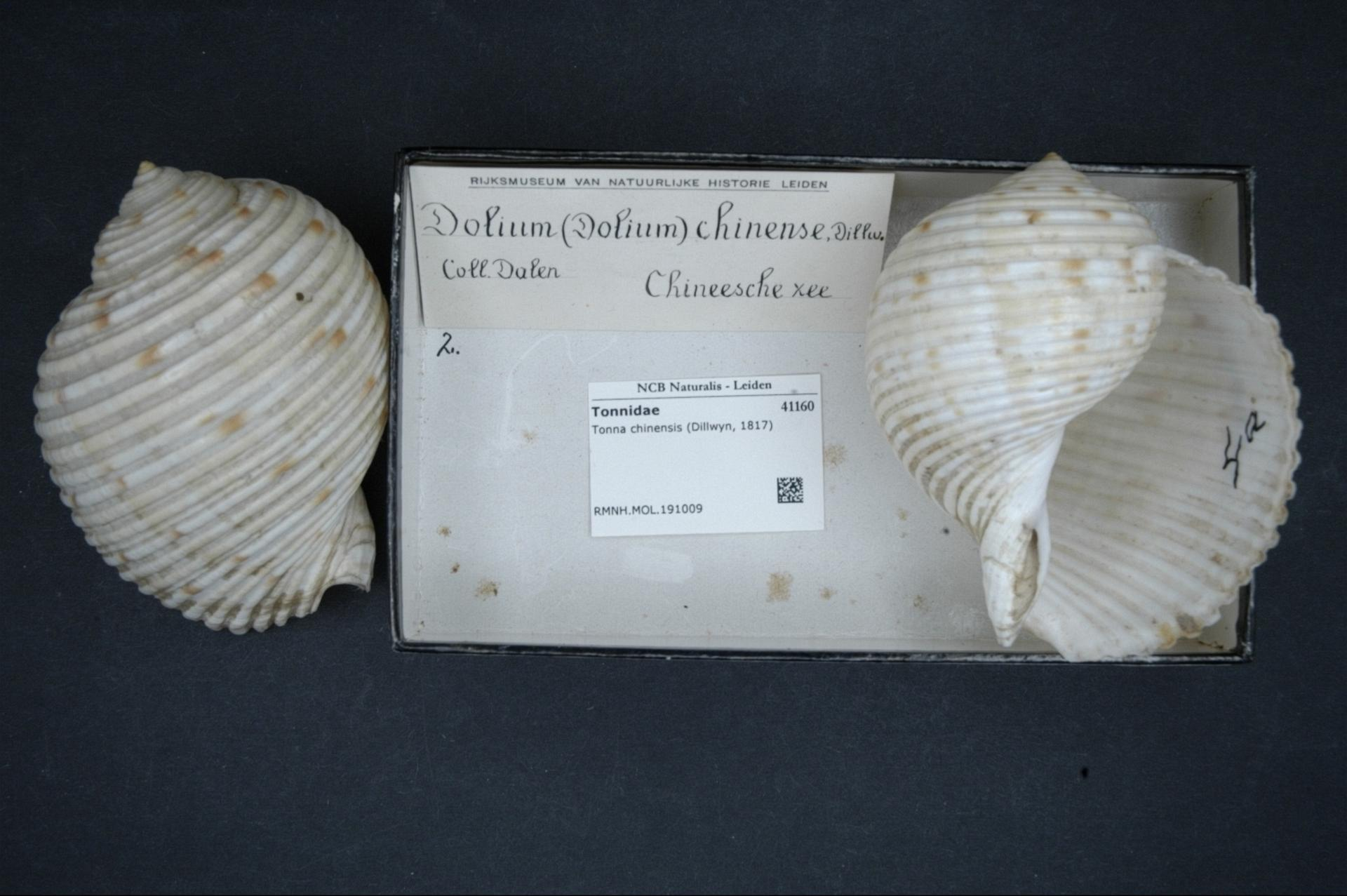

Scientific classification
- Kingdom: Animalia
- Phylum: Mollusca
- Class: Gastropoda
- Subclass: Caenogastropoda
- Order: Littorinimorpha
- Family: Tonnidae
- Genus: Tonna
- Species: T. chinensis

Binomial name
- Tonna chinensis (Dillwyn, 1817)

Synonyms
- Buccinum chinense Dillwyn, 1817 (basionym); Dolium (Dolium) chinense (Dillwyn, 1817)(Recombination); Dolium (Dolium) chinense var. magnifica (G. B. Sowerby III, 1904) (Recombination of synonym); Dolium australe Mörch, 1853; Dolium chinense (Dillwyn, 1817)(Recombination); Dolium magnificum G.B. Sowerby III, 1904; Dolium pictum Schepman, 1893; Dolium schepmani Bayer, 1937; Dolium variegatum Philippi, 1847; Dolium variegatum var. chinense Tryon, 1885; Tonna (Tonna) chinensis (Dillwyn, 1817) (Recombination); Tonna (Tonna) schepmani (Bayer, 1937) (Recombination of synonym); Tonna chinensis magnifica Kira, 1959

= Tonna chinensis =

China tun

Species of gastropod

Tonna chinensis, common name : the China tun, is a species of large sea snail, a marine gastropod mollusk in the family Tonnidae, the tun shells.

== Description ==
The size of an adult shell can grow to 98 mm, but most are usually below 50 mm.

== Distribution ==
This species occurs in the Indo-West Pacific.

== Bibliography ==
- Beu, A. G. (2005) Neogene fossil tonnoidean gastropods of Indonesia. Scripta Geologica 130, p. 1-186, pp. 166, figs. 327
- Vos C. (2005) Notes on Tonnidae of the T. variegata complex and T. chinensis complex, with descriptions of four new species (Gastropoda: Tonnidae). Visaya 1(5): 45–62. [November 2005]
- Vos, C. (2007). A conchological Iconography (No. 13) - The family Tonnidae. 123 pp., 30 numb. plus 41 (1 col.) un-numb. text-figs, 33 maps., 63 col. pls, Conchbooks, Germany
- Vos, C. (2008) Tonnidae. in Poppe G.T. (ed.) Philippine Marine Mollusks, Volume 1: Gastropoda 1: 594–611, pls 242–250. Conchbooks, Hackenheim, Germany
- Liu, J.Y. [Ruiyu] (ed.). (2008). Checklist of marine biota of China seas. China Science Press. 1267 pp.
- Vos, C. (2012) Overview of the Tonnidae (MOLLUSCA: GASTROPODA) in Chinese waters. Shell Discoveries 1(1); pp. 12–22; Pls. 1-9
- Vos, C. (2013) Overview of the Tonnidae (Mollusca: Gastropoda) in Chinese waters. Gloria Maris 52(1-2); pp. 22–53; Pls. 1-9
