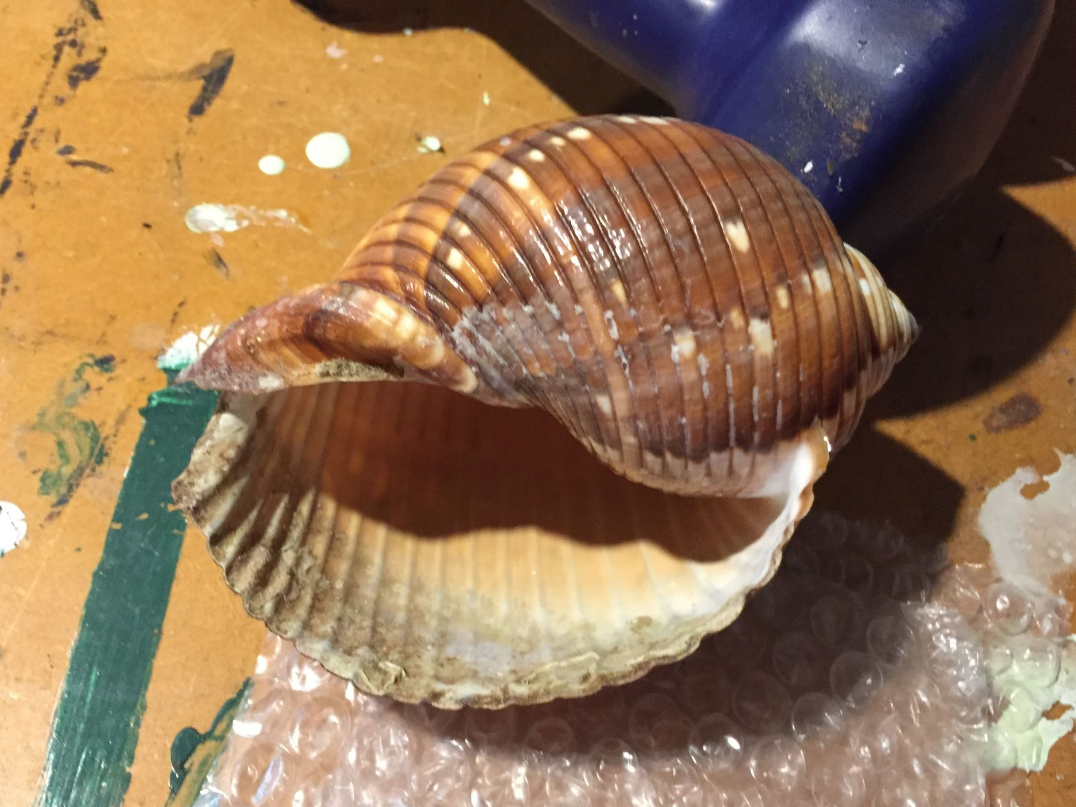

Scientific classification
- Kingdom: Animalia
- Phylum: Mollusca
- Class: Gastropoda
- Subclass: Caenogastropoda
- Order: Littorinimorpha
- Family: Tonnidae
- Genus: Tonna
- Species: T. poppei

Binomial name
- Tonna poppei Vos, 2005

Synonyms
- Tonna cimingii Hinton, 1974

= Tonna poppei =

Species of gastropod

Tonna poppei is a large species of sea snail, a marine gastropod mollusk in the family Tonnidae, the tun shells.
