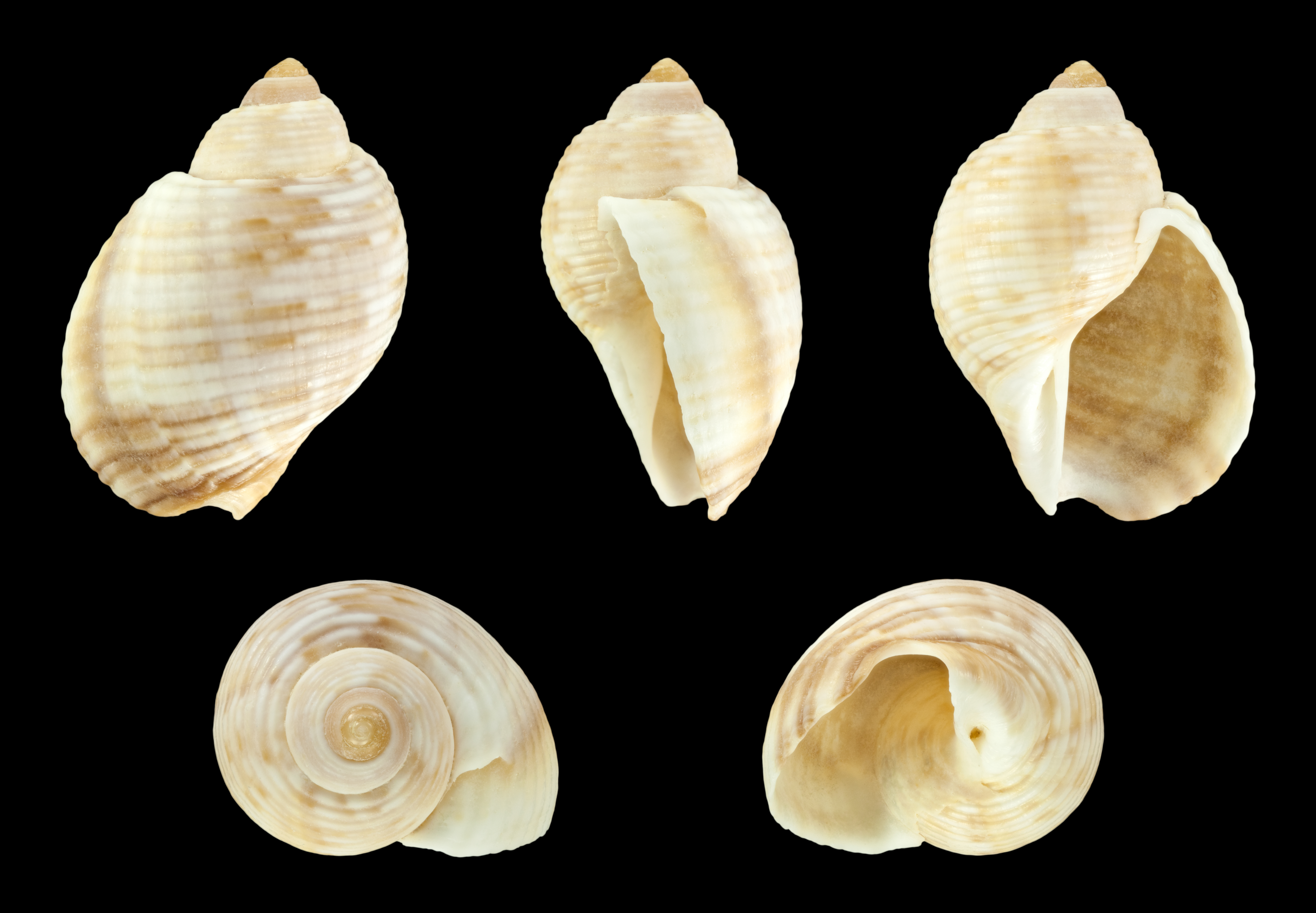
- Five views of a shell of Tonna pennata

Scientific classification
- Kingdom: Animalia
- Phylum: Mollusca
- Class: Gastropoda
- Subclass: Caenogastropoda
- Order: Littorinimorpha
- Family: Tonnidae
- Genus: Tonna
- Species: T. pennata

Binomial name
- Tonna pennata (Mörch, 1853)

Synonyms
- Buccinum maculosum Dillwyn, 1817; Dolium album Conrad, 1854; Dolium (Dolium) album (Conrad, 1854) (Recombination of synonym); Dolium (Dolium) perdix pennata (Mörch, 1853) (Recombination); Dolium pennatum Mörch, 1853; Dolium perdix occidentalis Mörch, 1877; Helix sulfurea Dall, 1889; Helix sulphurea C. B. Adams, 1849(Synonym – Not available); Tonna (Tonna) maculosa (Dillwyn, 1817) (Recombination of synonym); Tonna maculosa (Dillwyn, 1817) (Recombination of synonym)

= Tonna pennata =

Species of gastropod

Tonna pennata is a large species of sea snail, a marine gastropod mollusc in the family Tonnidae, the tun shells. Commonly known as the Atlantic partridge tun, the species is a predator of animals much larger than itself, particularly sea cucumbers.

== Description ==
This shell varies in colour from beige to dark brown, and the whitish markings are quite variable, which may account for the large number of synonyms that exist. The shell is pear-shaped, with a moderately blunt apex; the wide, flared aperture with a thin lip occupies about three quarters of the length of the shell. The umbilicus is open and the columella twisted. The surface of the shell is finely striated, with shallow grooves between the ribs. The largest whorl has about twenty ribs, and there is no operculum. The maximum shell length is about 15 cm (6 in). In living animals, the mantle is white with brown markings, and flares widely as the animal moves about. The snail could be confused with Tonna galea, but that species is more globular with a blunter apex; another similar species is Eudolium bairdii, but that is usually found at much greater depths. Tonna perdix is a similar species from the Pacific Ocean, and the two may be part of a species complex.

== Distribution and habitat ==
Tonna pennata is found in shallow water in the tropical western Atlantic Ocean, the Caribbean Sea and the Gulf of Mexico and in the eastern Atlantic in the Canary Islands, Madeira and the West African coast. It is usually found in reef areas, on coral and rock, and in sandy areas and seagrass meadows. The minimum recorded depth for this species is 0 m; the maximum recorded depth is 13 m.

== Ecology ==
Tonna pennata is a predator, specialising in sea cucumbers, particularly those in the family Stichopodidae. It also preys on bivalve molluscs and fish. It has a long eversible proboscis, with which it envelops smaller prey, or presses the organ against larger prey, secreting saliva containing sulphuric acid which paralyses its victim and starts the digestive processes. It attacks prey much larger than itself, such as the slow-moving sea cucumber Isostichopus badionotus, which can grow to a length of 50 cm (20 in). The sea cucumber has developed a strategy for getting rid of its attacker. It stiffens the area round the injury which then softens, and muscular contractions cause a patch of integument to autotomise (come away from its body).
