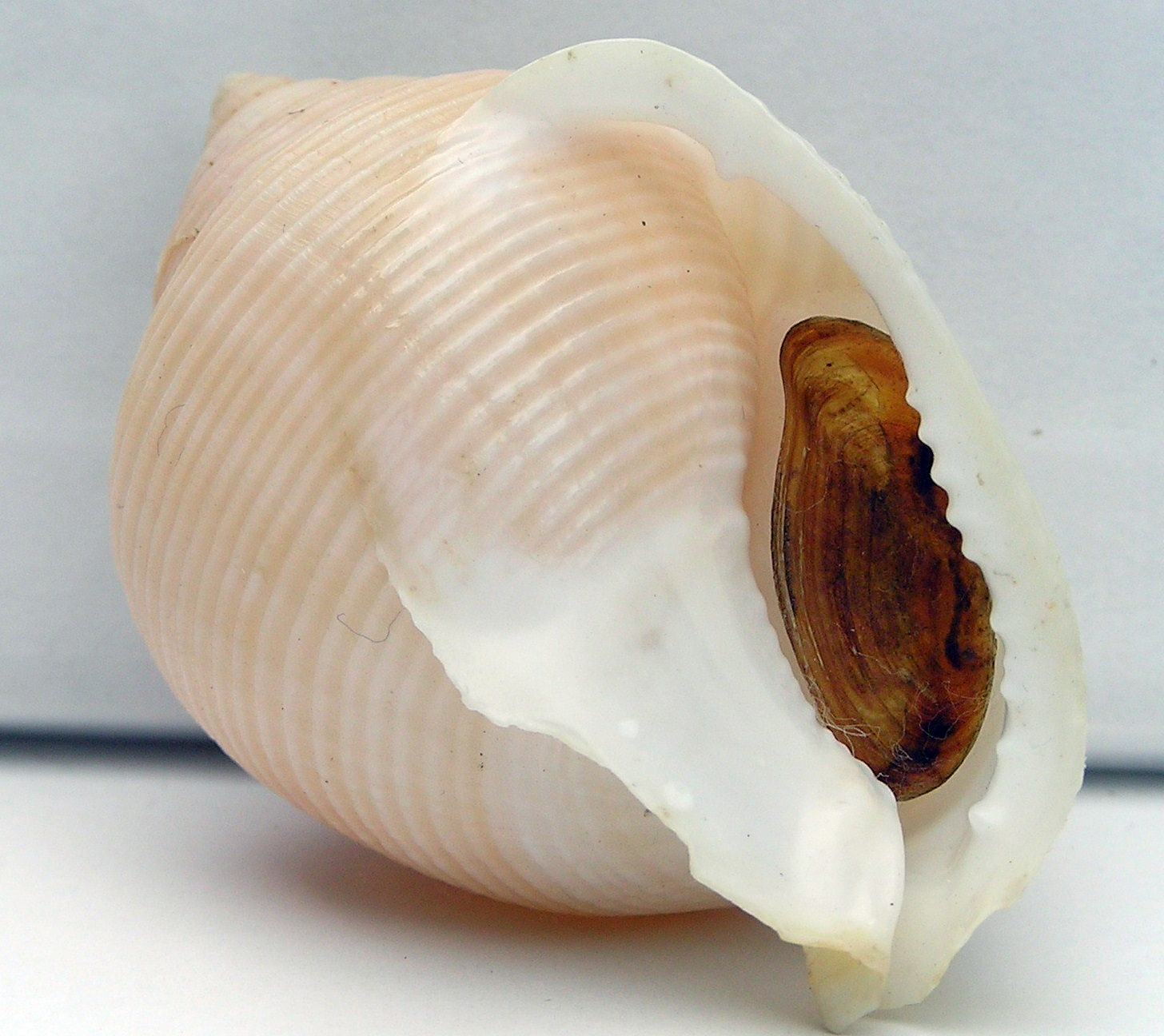
- Galeodea rugosa

Scientific classification
- Domain: Eukaryota
- Kingdom: Animalia
- Phylum: Mollusca
- Class: Gastropoda
- Subclass: Caenogastropoda
- Order: Littorinimorpha
- Superfamily: Tonnoidea
- Family: Cassidae
- Genus: Galeodea; Link, 1807

Type species
- Buccinum echinophorum (Linnaeus, 1758)

Synonyms
- Cassidaria Lamarck, 1816; Echinora Schumacher, 1817; Galeodea (Galeoocorys) Kuroda & Habe, 1957; † Galeodea (Mambrinia) J. Gardner, 1939 · accepted, alternate representation; Galeoocorys Kuroda & Habe, 1957; Morio Montfort, 1810; † Taieria Finlay & Marwick, 1937

= Galeodea =

Galeodea Temporal range: Cretaceous - Quaternary

Genus of gastropods

Galeodea is a genus of large sea snails, marine gastropod mollusks in the subfamily Cassinae of the family Cassidae.

== Fossil record ==
This genus is known in the fossil record from the Cretaceous period to the Quaternary period (age range: from 99.7 to 0.126 million years ago.). Fossil shells within this genus have been found all over the world.

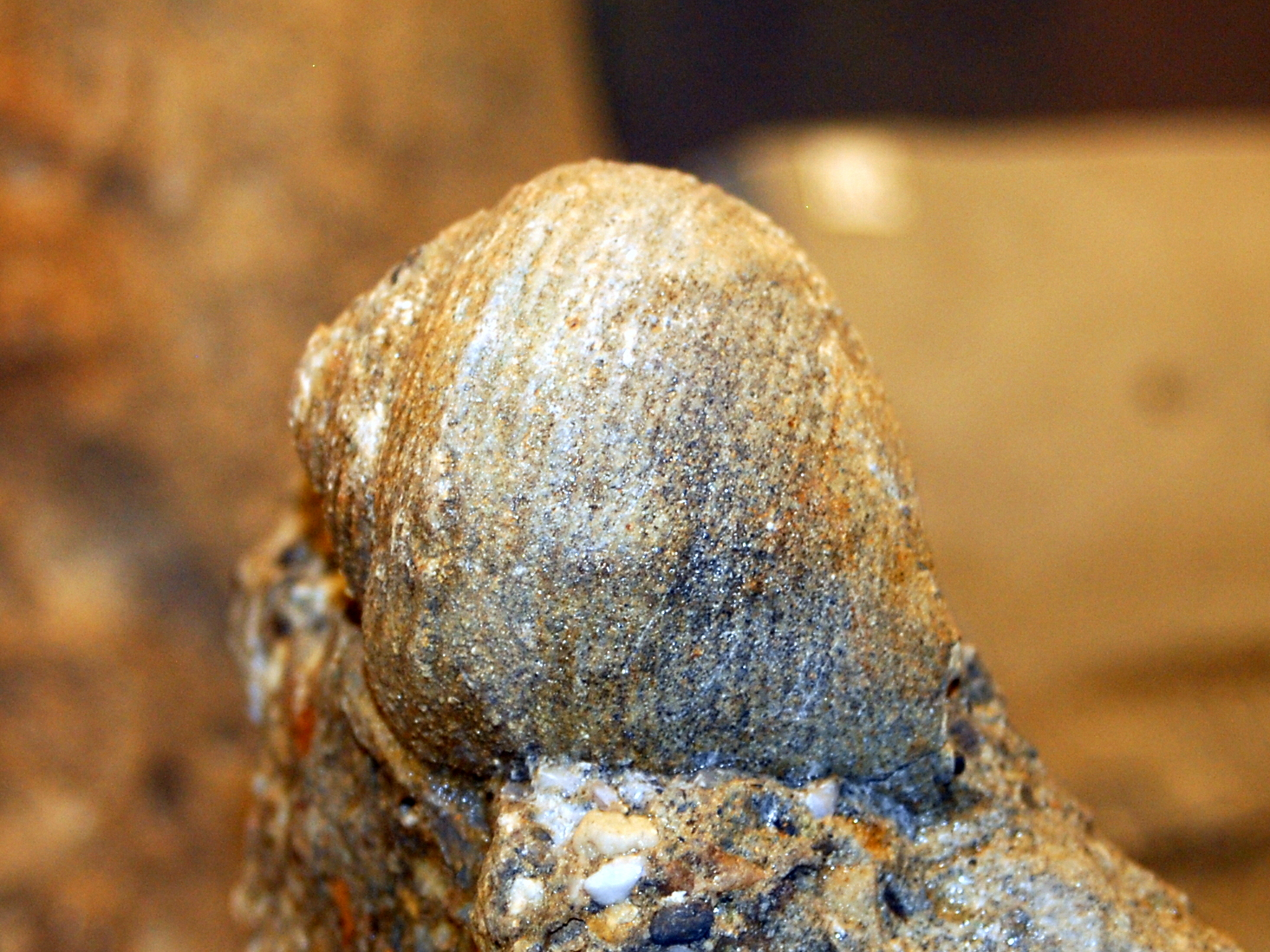
Fossil of Galeodea tauroglobosa

== Species ==
Species within the genus Galeodea include:

- † Galeodea aegyptiaca Oppenheim, 1906
- Galeodea alcocki (E. A. Smith, 1906)
- † Galeodea allani Finlay and Marwick, 1937
- †Galeodea apodemetes Marwick, 1934
- Galeodea bicatenata Sowerby I, 1815
- Galeodea bituminata (K. Martin, 1933)
- † Galeodea californica B. L. Clark, 1942
- † Galeodea depressa Buch, 1831
- Galeodea echinophora Linnaeus, 1758
- † Galeodea flemingi Beu & Maxwell, 1990
- † Galeodea geniculosa Marwick, 1942
- Galeodea hoaraui Drivas & Jay, 1989
- Galeodea keyteri (Kilburn, 1975)
- Galeodea koureos Gardner, 1939
- Galeodea leucodoma Dall, 1907
- Galeodea maccamleyi Ponder, 1983
- † Galeodea megacephala Philippi, 1843
- † Galeodea modesta (Suter, 1917)
- † Galeodea petersoni Conrad, 1854
- † Galeodea planotecta Meyer and Aldrich, 1886
- Galeodea plauta Beu, 2008
- Galeodea rugosa (Linnaeus, 1771)
- † Galeodea senex (Hutton, 1873)
- † Galeodea sulcata (Hutton, 1873)
- † Galeodea sutterensis Dickerson, 1916
- † Galeodea tetratropis Gain, Belliard & Le Renard, 2017
- Galeodea triganceae Dell, 1953
- †Galeodea wylliei Marwick, 1931

Species brought into synonymy

- Galeodea beui Kreipl & Alf, 2002: synonym of Galeodea alcocki (E.A. Smith, 1906)
- Galeodea carolimartini Beets, 1943 † : synonym of Galeodea bituminata (K. Martin, 1933)
- Galeodea echinophorella Habe, 1961: synonym of Galeodea bituminata (K. Martin, 1933)
- Galeodea javana (K. Martin, 1879) †: synonym of Eudolium crosseanum (Monterosato, 1869) (Recombination of synonym)
- Galeodea marginalba Yamamoto & Sakurai, 1977: synonym of Galeodea bituminata (K. Martin, 1933)
- Galeodea nipponica (Sakurai & Habe in Habe, 1961): synonym of Galeodea alcocki (E. A. Smith, 1906)
- Galeodea noharai Noda, 1980 † : synonym of Galeodea bituminata (K. Martin, 1933)
- Galeodea postcoronata Sacco, 1890: synonym of Galeodea echinophora (Linnaeus, 1758)
- Galeodea susanae Schenck, 1926 †: synonym of Galeodea sutterensis Dickerson, 1916 †
- Galeodea tyrrhena (Gmelin, 1791): synonym of Galeodea rugosa (Linnaeus, 1771)
