= List of marine molluscs of Australia =

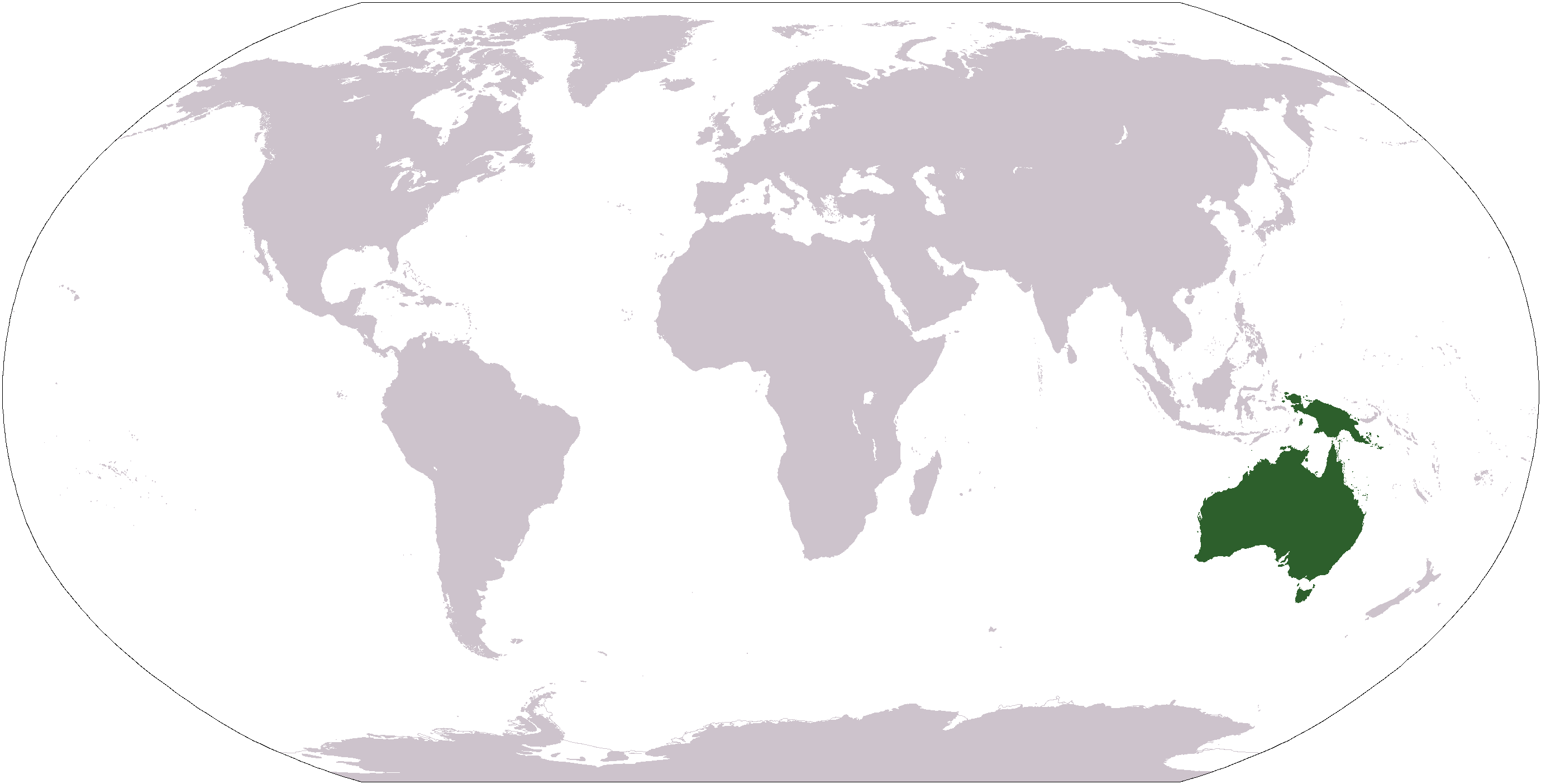
Location of Australia

Marine molluscs of Australia are a part of the molluscan fauna of Australia.

Marine molluscs include saltwater snails, clams and other classes of Mollusca.

== Gastropoda ==
- Tonna tankervillii (Hanley, 1860)

== See also ==
- List of molluscs of the Houtman Abrolhos
- List of non-marine molluscs of Australia
- List of marine molluscs of New Zealand
