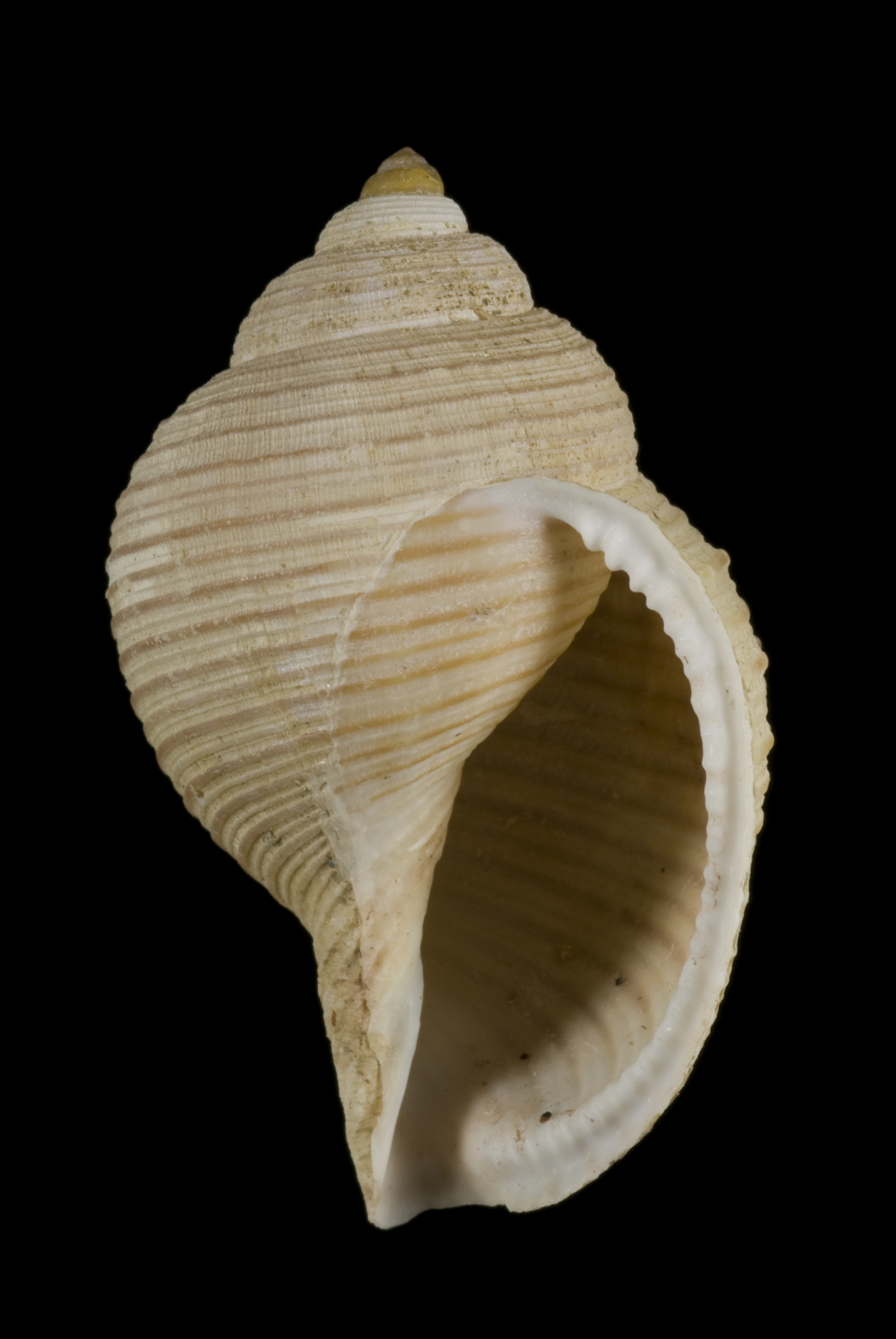
- Shell of Galeodea alcocki (specimen at MNHN, Paris)

Scientific classification
- Kingdom: Animalia
- Phylum: Mollusca
- Class: Gastropoda
- Subclass: Caenogastropoda
- Order: Littorinimorpha
- Family: Cassidae
- Genus: Galeodea
- Species: G. alcocki

Binomial name
- Galeodea alcocki (E.A. Smith, 1906)

Synonyms
- Galeoda beui Kreipl & Alf, 2002; Galeoocorys nipponica Sakurai & Habe [in Habe], 1961; Morio alcocki E.A. Smith, 1906 (basionym); Oocorys alcocki (E.A. Smith, 1906)

= Galeodea alcocki =

Species of gastropod

Galeodea alcocki, common name: Alcock's false tun, is a species of large sea snail, a marine gastropod mollusk in the family Cassidae, the helmet snails and bonnet snails.

== Description ==
The shell size varies between 50 mm and 115 mm.

== Distribution ==
This marine species occurs in the Bay of Bengal and off the Philippines and Papua New Guinea.
