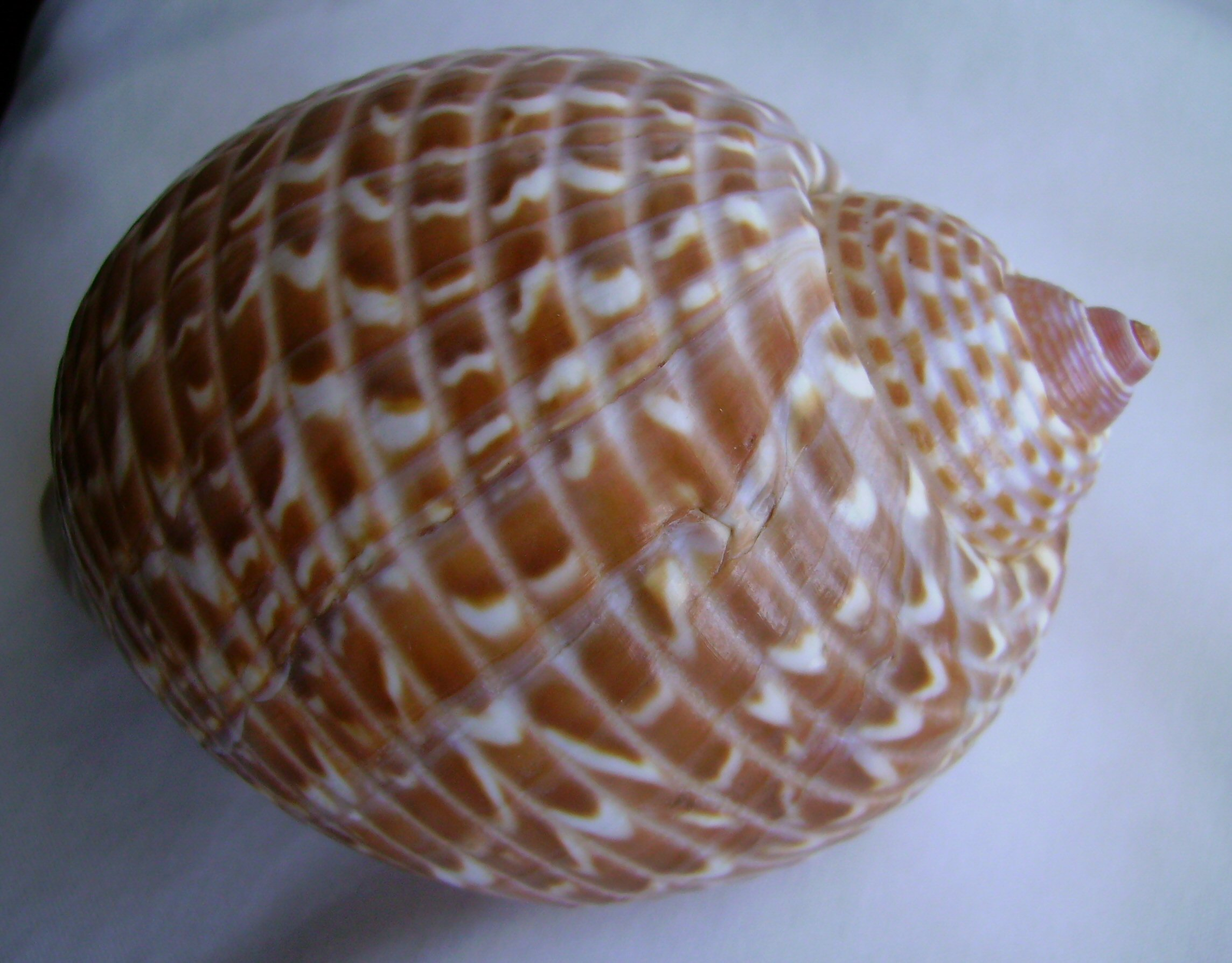
- Dorsal view of a shell of Tonna perdix
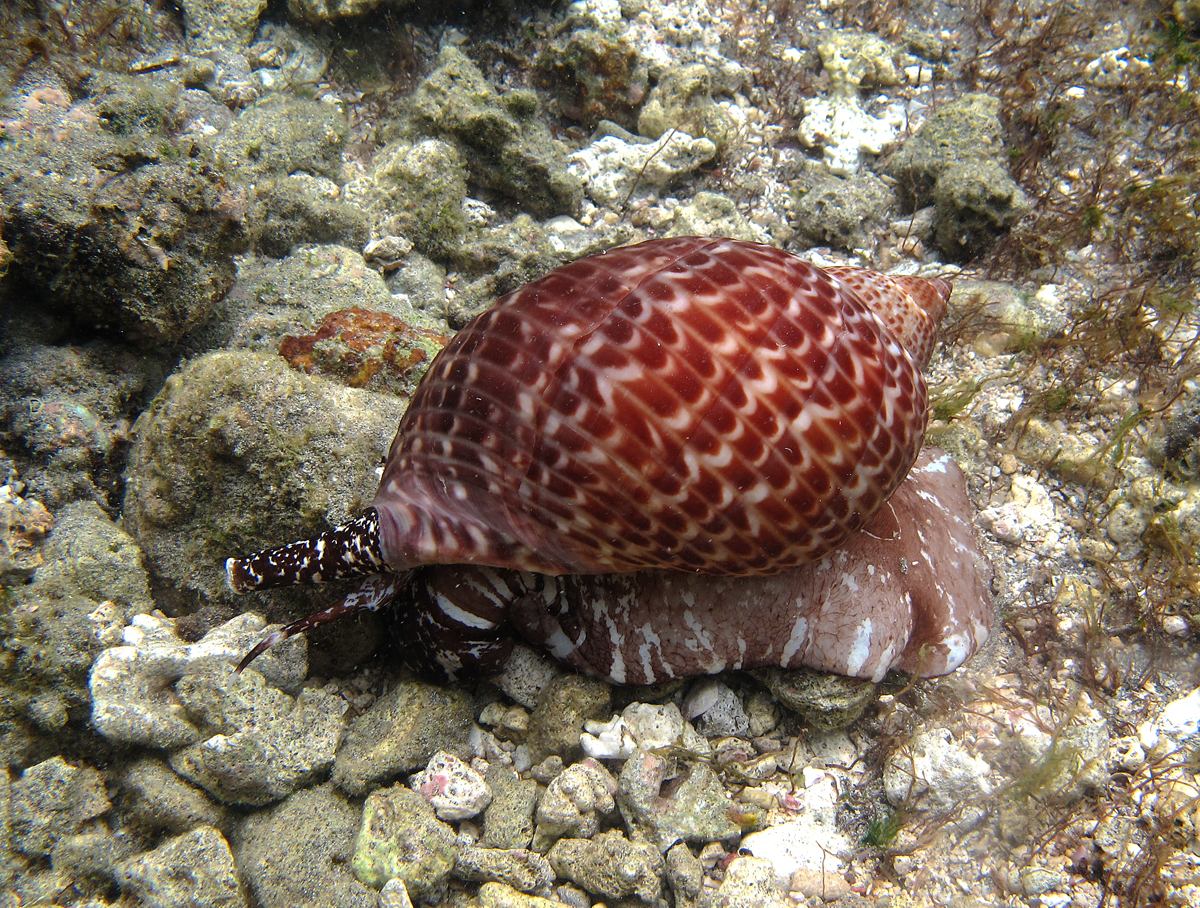
- An image of a live individual showing the siphon

Scientific classification
- Kingdom: Animalia
- Phylum: Mollusca
- Class: Gastropoda
- Subclass: Caenogastropoda
- Order: Littorinimorpha
- Family: Tonnidae
- Genus: Tonna
- Species: T. perdix

Binomial name
- Tonna perdix (Linnaeus, 1758)

Synonyms
- synonymy: Buccinum perdix Linnaeus, 1758 (basionym); Cadium perdix (Linnaeus, 1758); Cadus coturnix Röding, 1798; Cadus meleagris Röding, 1798; Cadus perdix (Linnaeus, 1758); Dolium (Dolium) perdix (Linnaeus, 1758) (Recombination); Dolium (Dolium) perdix var. rufa (Blainville, 1829) (Recombination of synonym); Dolium pennatum Schröter in Martini, 1788; Dolium perdix (Linnaeus, 1758); Dolium perdix var. rufa Blainville, 1829; Dolium plumatum Green, 1830; Dolium rufum Blainville, 1829; Macgillivrayia pelagica Forbes, 1852; Perdix reticulatus Montfort, 1810 (Unnecessary substitute name for Buccinum perdix); Tonna (Tonna) perdix (Linnaeus, 1758) (Recombination); Tonna perdix f. paucimaculata Bozzetti, 2010; Tonna perdix var. rufa (Blainville, 1829)

= Tonna perdix =

Partridge tun

Species of gastropod

Tonna perdix, common name the partridge tun, is a species of very large sea snail, a marine gastropod mollusc in the family Tonnidae, the tun shells.

== Description ==
The pattern and brownish colour of the shell is reminiscent of a partridge's plumage hence the common name. The size of an adult shell varies between 70 mm and 220 mm.

The ovate-oblong shell is ventricose and pretty thin. It is of a reddish-brown color, pleasingly varied with white spots in transverse series, for the most part semi-lunar, and more or less distant. The conical spire is slightly projecting and pointed. It is composed of five to six whorls which are furnished with numerous ribs, often widened, feebly convex, and separated by furrows hardly apparent. The suture is very distinct and is slightly channeled towards the body whorl. The aperture is large, subovate, marked by transverse and slightly projecting bands, which correspond to the furrows of the exterior. The interior of this cavity is of a fawn color. The outer lip is thin, everted, a little undulated, and adorned with a white band the whole length of its interior, with the exception of the edge, which is of a deep brown. The inner lip is spread out over the body of the shell. It is very thin, transparent, and terminated below by a projecting plate which covers the umbilicus, and seems also to form a part of it. The columella is smooth, polished, and forms at the left of the umbilicus a thick rib, marked by transverse striae, which terminates at the emargination of the base.

The ground color of the shell is a bluish white, covered with irregular spots of a red brown, bordering upon the violet. The foot is colored in the same manner beneath, but above, it is furrowed with wide triangular radiating bands. The tentacles are doubly ringed with brown.

== Distribution ==
This species occurs in the Red Sea and in the Indian Ocean off Aldabra, Chagos, Madagascar, the Mascarene Basin, Mauritius and Tanzania, and in the Pacific Ocean off New Zealand, Australia (Northern Territory, Queensland, Western Australia) and the Galapagos Islands.

The mollusk of this shell inhabits rapid waters, and appears pretty quick in its movements.

== Biology and diet ==
This gastropod is a highly specialized carnivorous predator, preying on sea cucumbers.

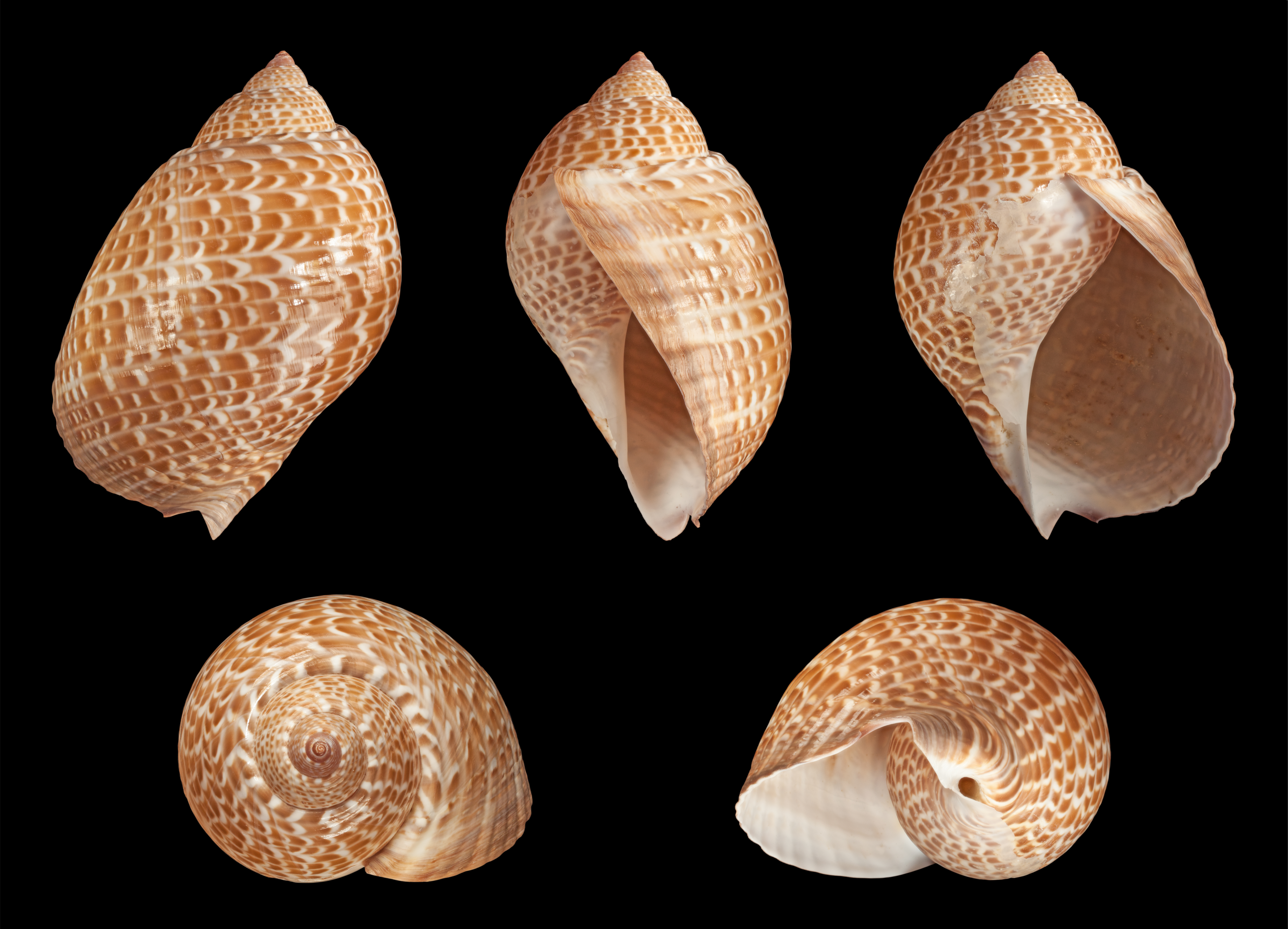
Spotted form

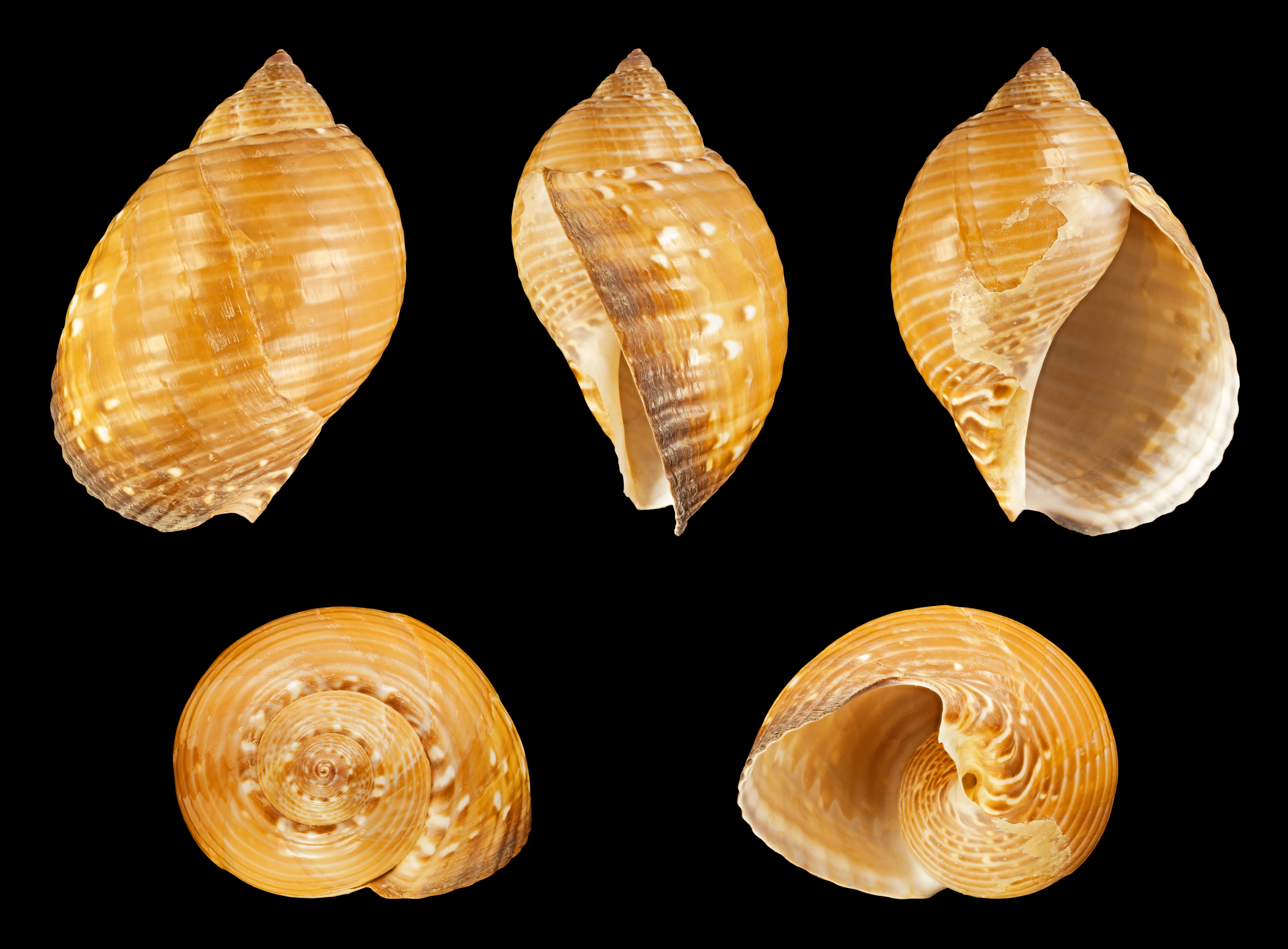
Brown form

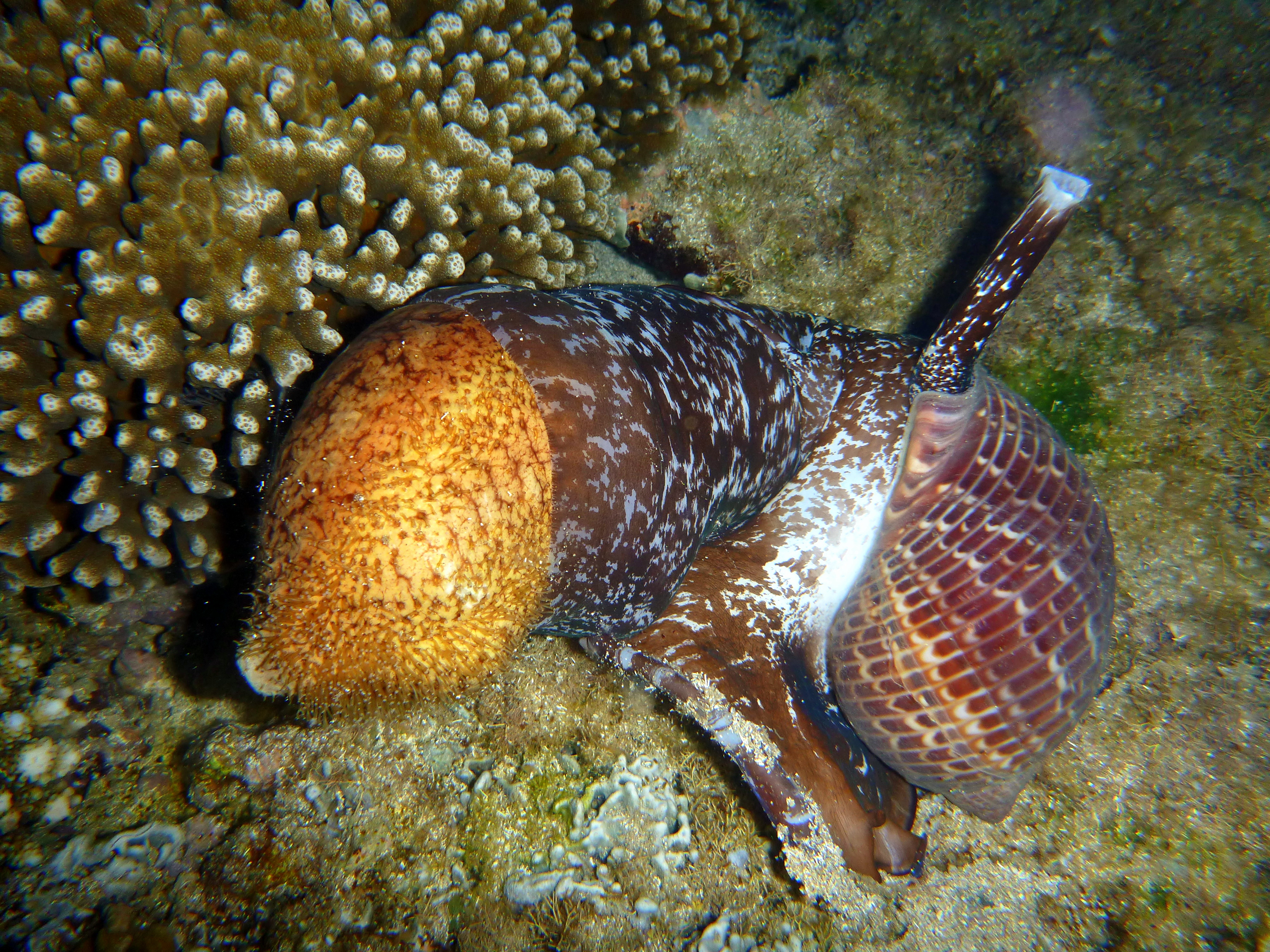
This tun has paralyzed an Actinopyga echinites at Réunion Island, and is in the process of eating it.

== Bibliography ==
- Hedley, C. 1919. A review of the Australian Tun Shells. Records of the Australian Museum 12(11): 329-336, pls 39-44
- Dautzenberg, Ph. (1929). Mollusques testacés marins de Madagascar. Faune des Colonies Francaises, Tome III
- Turner, R.D. 1948. The family Tonnidae in the western Atlantic. Johnsonia: Monographs of the marine mollusks of the Western Atlantic 2(26): 165-192, pl. 74-85
- Kilias, R. 1962. Gastropoda/Prosobranchia. Tonnidae. Das Tierreich 77: 1-63
- Kay, E.A. 1979. Hawaiian Marine Shells. Reef and shore fauna of Hawaii. Section 4 : Mollusca. Honolulu, Hawaii : Bishop Museum Press Bernice P. Bishop Museum Special Publication Vol. 64(4) 653 pp.
- Drivas, J. & M. Jay (1988). Coquillages de La Réunion et de l'île Maurice
- Morton, B. (1991) Aspects of Predation by Tonna zonatum (PROSOBRANCHIA: TONNOIDEA) Feeding on Holothurians in Hong Kong. J. Moll. Stud. (1991), 57, 11-19.
- Wilson, B. 1993. Australian Marine Shells. Prosobranch Gastropods. Kallaroo, Western Australia : Odyssey Publishing Vol. 1 408 pp.
- Vos, C. (2007). A conchological Iconography (No. 13) - The family Tonnidae. 123 pp., 30 numb. plus 41 (1 col.) un-numb. text-figs, 33 maps., 63 col. pls, Conchbooks, Germany
- Vos, C. (2008) Tonnidae. in Poppe G.T. (ed.) Philippine Marine Mollusks, Volume 1: Gastropoda 1: 594-611, pls 242-250. Conchbooks, Hackenheim, Germany.
- Spencer, H.; Marshall. B. (2009). All Mollusca except Opisthobranchia. In: Gordon, D. (Ed.) (2009). New Zealand Inventory of Biodiversity. Volume One: Kingdom Animalia. 584 pp
- Beu, A. G. (2005) Neogene fossil tonnoidean gastropods of Indonesia. Scripta Geologica 130, p. 1-186, pp. 166, figs. 327
- Beu, A.G., Bouchet, P. & Tröndlé, J. 2012. Tonnoidean gastropods of French Polynesia. Molluscan Research 32(2): 61-120
- Cernohorsky. W. O. (1972). Marine Shells of the Pacific. Vol. II. Pacific Publications, Sydney, 411 pp.
- Steyn, D.G. & Lussi, M. (1998) Marine Shells of South Africa. An Illustrated Collector's Guide to Beached Shells. Ekogilde Publishers, Hartebeespoort, South Africa, ii + 264 pp.
- Liu, J.Y. [Ruiyu] (ed.). (2008). Checklist of marine biota of China seas. China Science Press. 1267 pp.
- Steyn, D. G.; Lussi, M. (2005). Offshore Shells of Southern Africa: A pictorial guide to more than 750 Gastropods. Published by the authors. pp. i–vi, 1–289.
- Vos, C. (2012) Overview of the Tonnidae (MOLLUSCA: GASTROPODA) in Chinese waters. Shell Discoveries 1(1); pp. 12–22; Pls. 1-9
- Vos, C. (2013) Overview of the Tonnidae (Mollusca: Gastropoda) in Chinese waters. Gloria Maris 52(1-2); pp. 22–53; Pls. 1-9
- Severns, M. (2011). Shells of the Hawaiian Islands - The Sea Shells. Conchbooks, Hackenheim. 564 pp.
