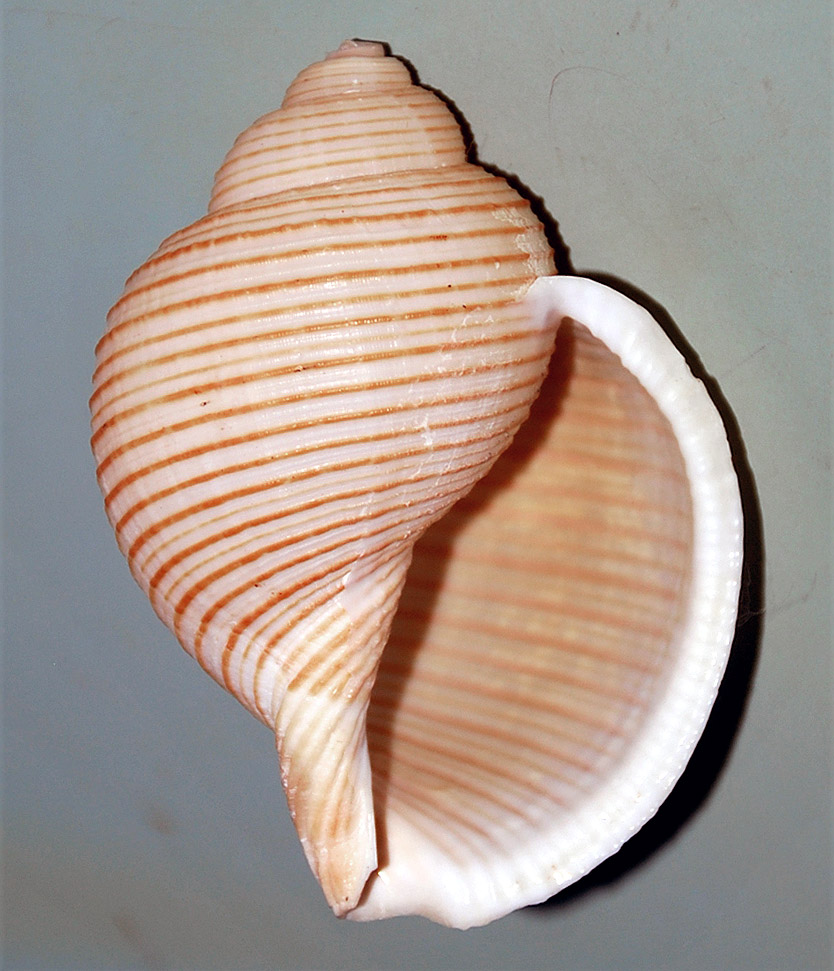
- Eudolium crosseanum shell

Scientific classification
- Kingdom: Animalia
- Phylum: Mollusca
- Class: Gastropoda
- Subclass: Caenogastropoda
- Order: Littorinimorpha
- Superfamily: Tonnoidea
- Family: Tonnidae
- Genus: Eudolium; Dall, 1889

Type species
- Dolium crosseanum Monterosato, T.A. de M. di, 1869

Synonyms
- Doliopsis di Monterosato, 1872 (non Vogt, 1852; non Conrad, 1865); Dolium (Eudolium) Dall, 1889; Tonna (Eudolium) Dall, 1889 (Eudolium is considered an independent genus.)

= Eudolium =

Genus of gastropods

Eudolium is a genus of large sea snails, marine gastropod mollusks in the family Tonnidae, the tun shells.

== Species ==
Species within the genus Eudolium include:

- † Eudolium aoteanum Beu, 1970
- Eudolium bairdii (Verrill & Smith in Verrill, 1881)
- Eudolium crosseanum (di Monterosato, 1869)

Species brought into synonymy

- Eudolium aulacodes Tomlin, 1927: synonym of Oocorys sulcata P. Fischer, 1884
- Eudolium inflatum Kuroda & Habe, 1952: synonym of Eudolium bairdii (Verrill & Smith in Verrill, 1881)
- Eudolium javanum (K. Martin, 1879) : synonym of Eudolium crosseanum (Monterosato, 1869) (Recombined synonym)
- Eudolium kuroharai Azuma, 1960: synonym of Eudolium bairdii (Verrill & Smith in Verrill, 1881)
- Eudolium lineatum Osima, 1943: synonym of Eudolium bairdii (Verrill & Smith in Verrill, 1881)
- Eudolium pyriforme (Sowerby, 1914): synonym of Eudolium crosseanum (Monterosato, 1869) (Recombined synonym)
- Eudolium solidior (Dautzenberg & Fischer, 1906): synonym of Eudolium bairdii (Verrill & S. Smith, 1881) (Recombined synonym)
- Eudolium testardi (Montrouzier, 1863): synonym of Tonna cumingii (Reeve, 1849) (erroneous recombination)
- Eudolium thompsoni McGinty, 1955: synonym of Eudolium crosseanum (di Monterosato, 1869)
