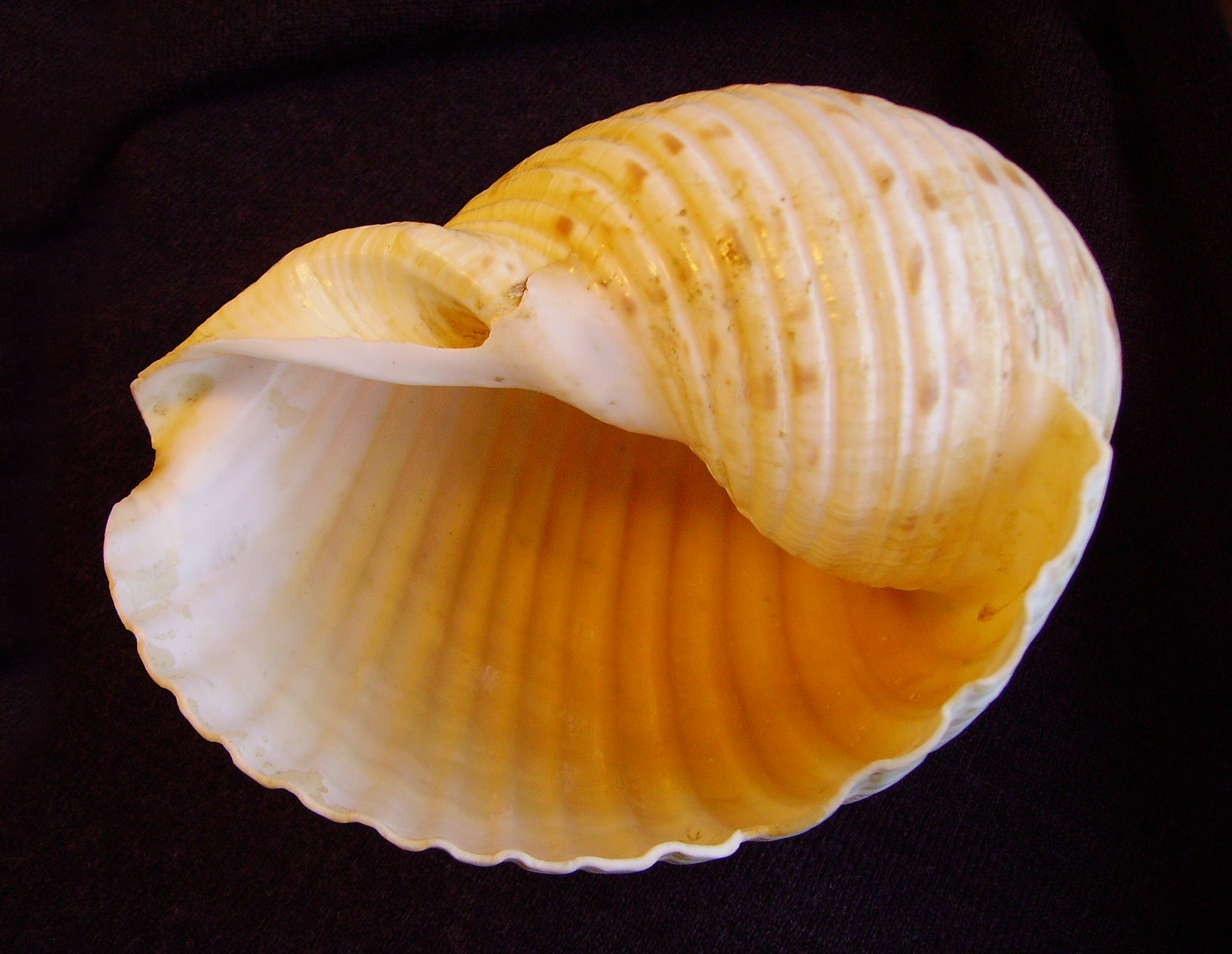
- A shell of Tonna tankervillii found on a northern New Zealand beach

Scientific classification
- Kingdom: Animalia
- Phylum: Mollusca
- Class: Gastropoda
- Subclass: Caenogastropoda
- Order: Littorinimorpha
- Family: Tonnidae
- Genus: Tonna
- Species: T. tankervillii

Binomial name
- Tonna tankervillii (Hanley, 1860)

Synonyms
- Tonna cerevisina Hedley, 1919

= Tonna tankervillii =

Species of gastropod

Tonna tankervillii is a very large species of sea snail or tun snail, a marine gastropod mollusc in the family Tonnidae, the tun shells.

== Distribution ==
This species is found in Australia, from Torres Strait in the north, down the east coast, and also on the northeast coast of New Zealand.

== Shell description ==
The shell height is up to 23 cm, and width 19 cm.
