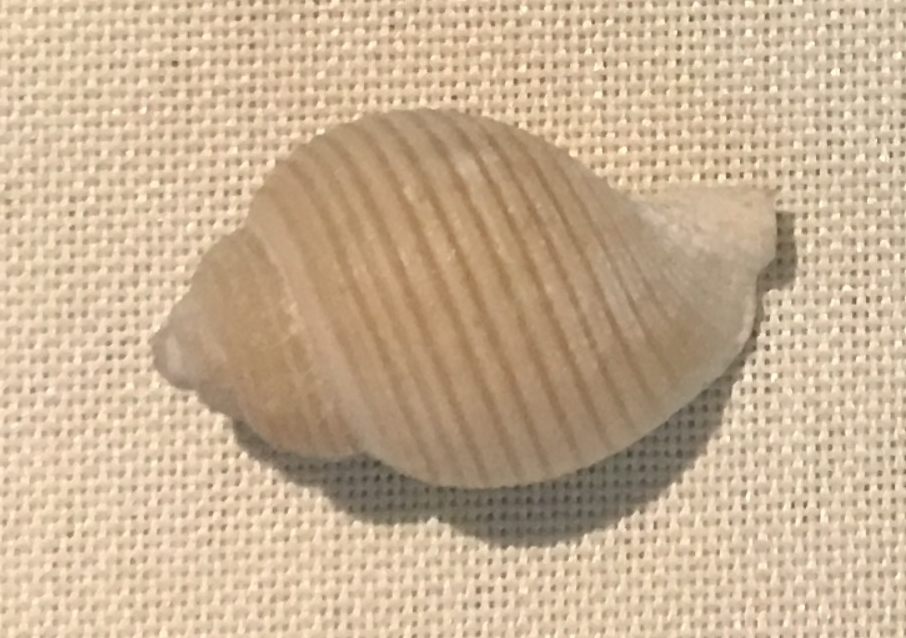
- Specimen from the Beijing Museum of Natural History

Scientific classification
- Kingdom: Animalia
- Phylum: Mollusca
- Class: Gastropoda
- Subclass: Caenogastropoda
- Order: Littorinimorpha
- Family: Tonnidae
- Genus: Eudolium
- Species: E. bairdii

Binomial name
- Eudolium bairdii (Verrill & Smith in Verrill, 1881)

Synonyms
- Dolium (Eudolium) bituminatum Martin, 1933; Dolium (Eudolium) crosseanum var. solidior Dautzenberg & Fischer, 1906; Dolium bairdii Verrill & Smith in Verrill, 1881; Dolium bayrdi 'Verrill' Paetel, 1887; Dolium biornatum Tate, 1894; Eudolium inflatum Kuroda & Habe, 1952; Eudolium kuroharai Azuma, 1960; Eudolium lineatum Osima, 1943; Morio lineata Schepman, 1909

= Eudolium bairdii =

Species of gastropod

Eudolium bairdii, common name Baird's bonnet, is a species of large sea snail, a marine gastropod mollusk in the family Tonnidae, the tun shells.

== Distribution ==
This marine species has a circumtropical distribution in the Atlantic, Indian, and Pacific Oceans. The species is recorded off South and East coast of South Africa at depths between 100 m and 500 m.

== Description ==
The maximum recorded shell length is 76 mm.

The shell is thin and globose, with a prominent spire and rounded whorls, accompanied by a strongly indented suture. Its surface is adorned with well-defined, narrow spiral cords of alternating strength. In adult specimens, the outer lip is thickened and flares outward, with a finely toothed inner edge. The anterior end features a pronounced siphonal notch.

The colour of the shell ranges from buff to pale brown, with the primary spiral cords being a darker brown. The spire may exhibit a subtle grey-blue tinge, while the tip of the spire (protoconch/apex), if present, is distinctly brown in color.

== Habitat ==
Minimum recorded depth is 17 m and maximum recorded depth is 823 m.
