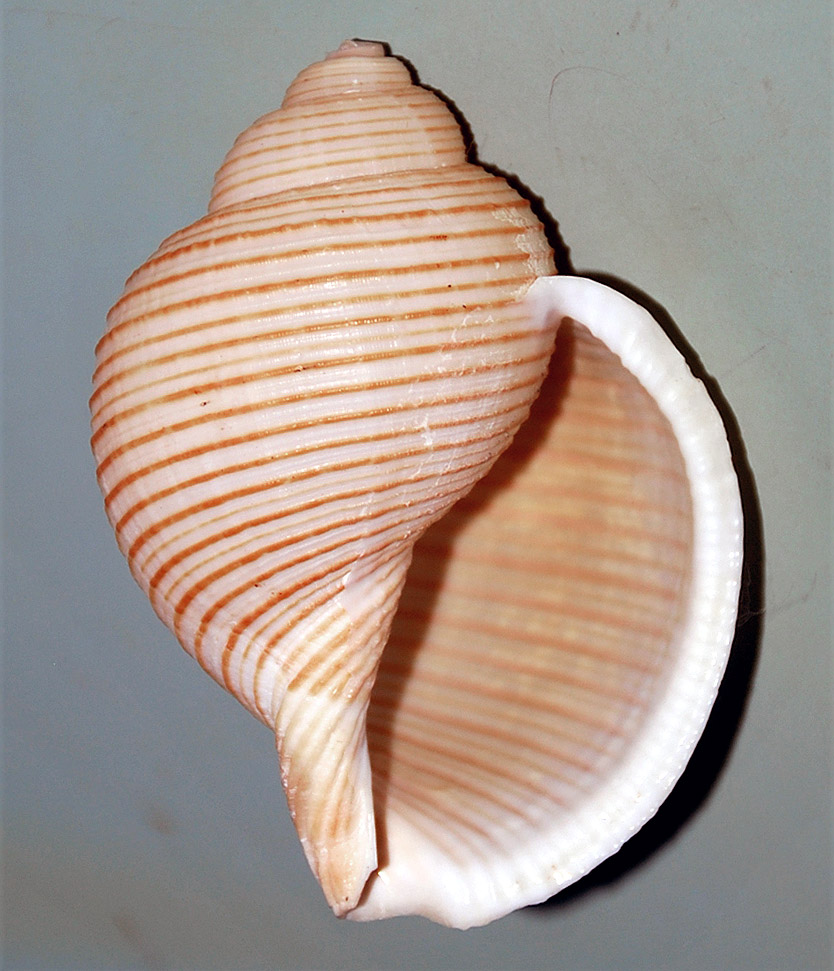
- Eudolium crosseanum shell

Scientific classification
- Kingdom: Animalia
- Phylum: Mollusca
- Class: Gastropoda
- Subclass: Caenogastropoda
- Order: Littorinimorpha
- Family: Tonnidae
- Genus: Eudolium
- Species: E. crosseanum

Binomial name
- Eudolium crosseanum (di Monterosato, 1869)

Synonyms
- Cassidaria javana Martin, 1879; Doliopsis crosseana di Monterosato, 1872; Dolium (Eudolium) crosseanum Monterosato, 1869 superseded combination; Dolium (Eudolium) pyriforme G. B. Sowerby III, 1914 junior subjective synonym; Dolium crosseanum di Monterosato, 1869; Dolium pyriforme G. B. Sowerby III, 1914; Eudolium javanum (K. Martin, 1879) (Recombined synonym); Eudolium pyriforme (G. B. Sowerby III, 1914) (Recombined synonym); Eudolium thompsoni McGinty, 1955; † Galeodea javana (K. Martin, 1879) (Recombination of synonym); Tonna (Eudolium) crosseana (Monterosato, 1869) superseded combination; Tonna (Eudolium) pyriformis (G. B. Sowerby III, 1914) (Recombined synonym); Tonna (Eudolium) thompsoni (McGinty, 1955) (Recombined synonym); Tonna pyriformis (G. B. Sowerby III, 1914) (Recombination of synonym)

= Eudolium crosseanum =

Species of gastropod

Eudolium crosseanum is a species of large sea snail, a marine gastropod mollusk in the family Tonnidae, the tun shells. It was first described as Dolium crosseanum in 1869 by Dolium crosseanum Tommaso Di Maria Allery Monterosato, but was transferred to the genus, Eudolium, in 1992 by Bruce A. Marshall.

== Distribution ==
Offshore Barbados, Lesser Antilles, as crabbed shells in deepwater traps. This species has a cosmopolitan distribution, being also found in waters off Australia.

== Description ==
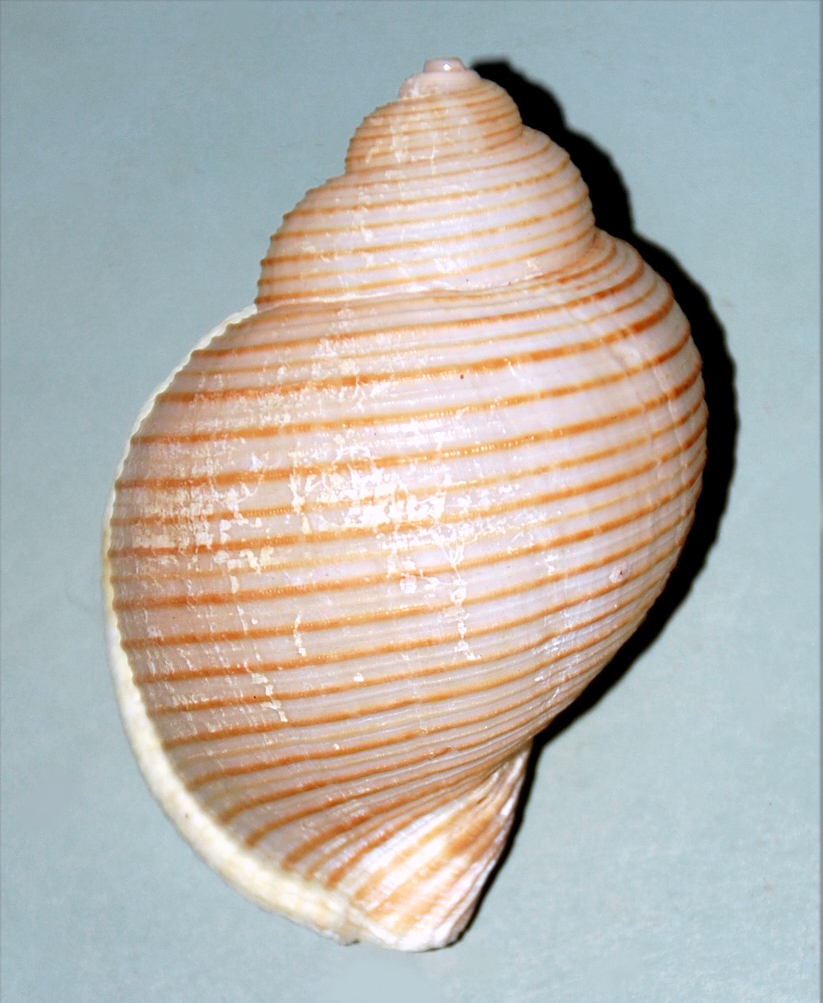
Abapertural view of a shell of E. crosseanum

The maximum recorded shell length is 81 mm, its diameter 56 mm.

(Original description in French) The shell is imperforate and oval-ventricose It is characterized by its thin structure and reddish-tawny coloration, marked with irregularly distributed, large whitish spots. Its surface is transversely ribbed, with the interstices between ribs exhibiting one to three small spiral striae, crossed at right angles by very fine, nearly obsolete longitudinal striae. The spire is conical and slightly elevated, featuring a deeply marked and narrowly subcanaliculate suture. The shell comprises six convex whorls, with the body whorl being exceptionally large and swollen, constituting more than 6/8 of the total length. It is adorned with 56 ribs (excluding spiral striae) and terminates in a straight siphonal canal. The aperture is nearly oval, slightly acuminate near the insertion point, and whitish-tawny in its interior. The peristome is simple, with its edges connected by a thin, barely discernible callus, which thickens behind the columella and forms a tooth-like projection near the insertion point. The columellar edge is nearly vertical, folded, and white. The basal edge is slightly notched and purplish-pink. The outer edge is broadly flared, reflected, slightly thickened, and features 55 internal denticulations with a pinkish hue, while its exterior is brown, often marked with white at the points where the ribs terminate. Several ribs are frequently articulated with white and red.

== Habitat ==
Minimum recorded depth is 17 m. Maximum recorded depth is 914 m.
