= Galeodea plauta =

Scientific classification
- Kingdom: Animalia
- Phylum: Mollusca
- Class: Gastropoda
- Subclass: Caenogastropoda
- Order: Littorinimorpha
- Family: Cassidae
- Genus: Galeodea
- Species: G. plauta

Binomial name
- Galeodea plauta Beu, 2008

Species of gastropod

Galeodea plauta is a species of large sea snail, a marine gastropod mollusc in the family Cassidae, the helmet snails and bonnet snails.

== Distribution ==
This marine species is endemic to New Zealand.
