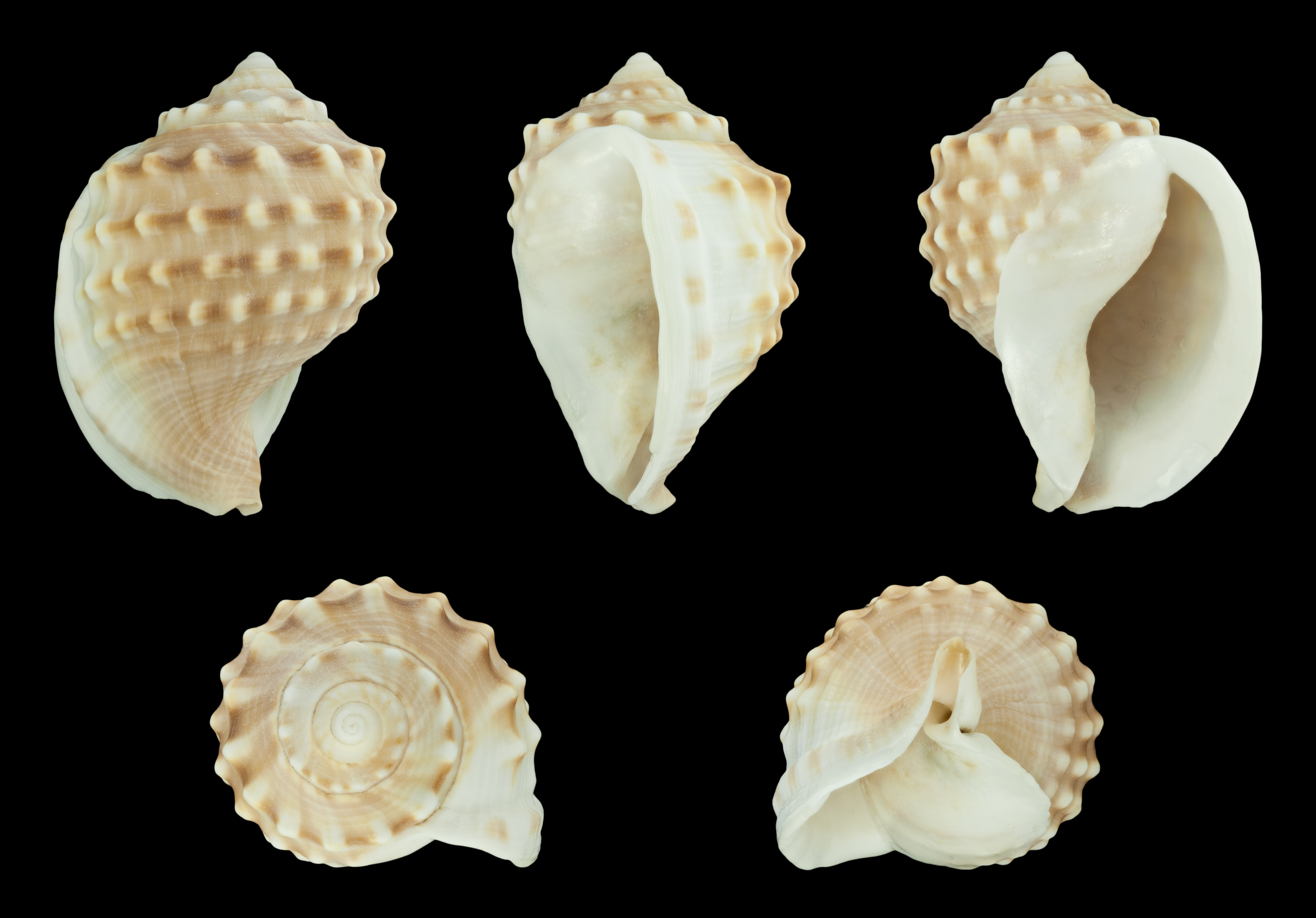
- A shell of Galeodea echinophora

Scientific classification
- Kingdom: Animalia
- Phylum: Mollusca
- Class: Gastropoda
- Subclass: Caenogastropoda
- Order: Littorinimorpha
- Family: Cassidae
- Genus: Galeodea
- Species: G. echinophora

Binomial name
- Galeodea echinophora (Linnaeus, 1758)

= Galeodea echinophora =

Galeodea echinophora Temporal range: Miocene-Recent

Species of gastropod

Galeodea echinophora, the spiny bonnet or helmet shell, is a species of large sea snail, a marine gastropod mollusk in the family Cassidae, the helmet snails and bonnet snails.

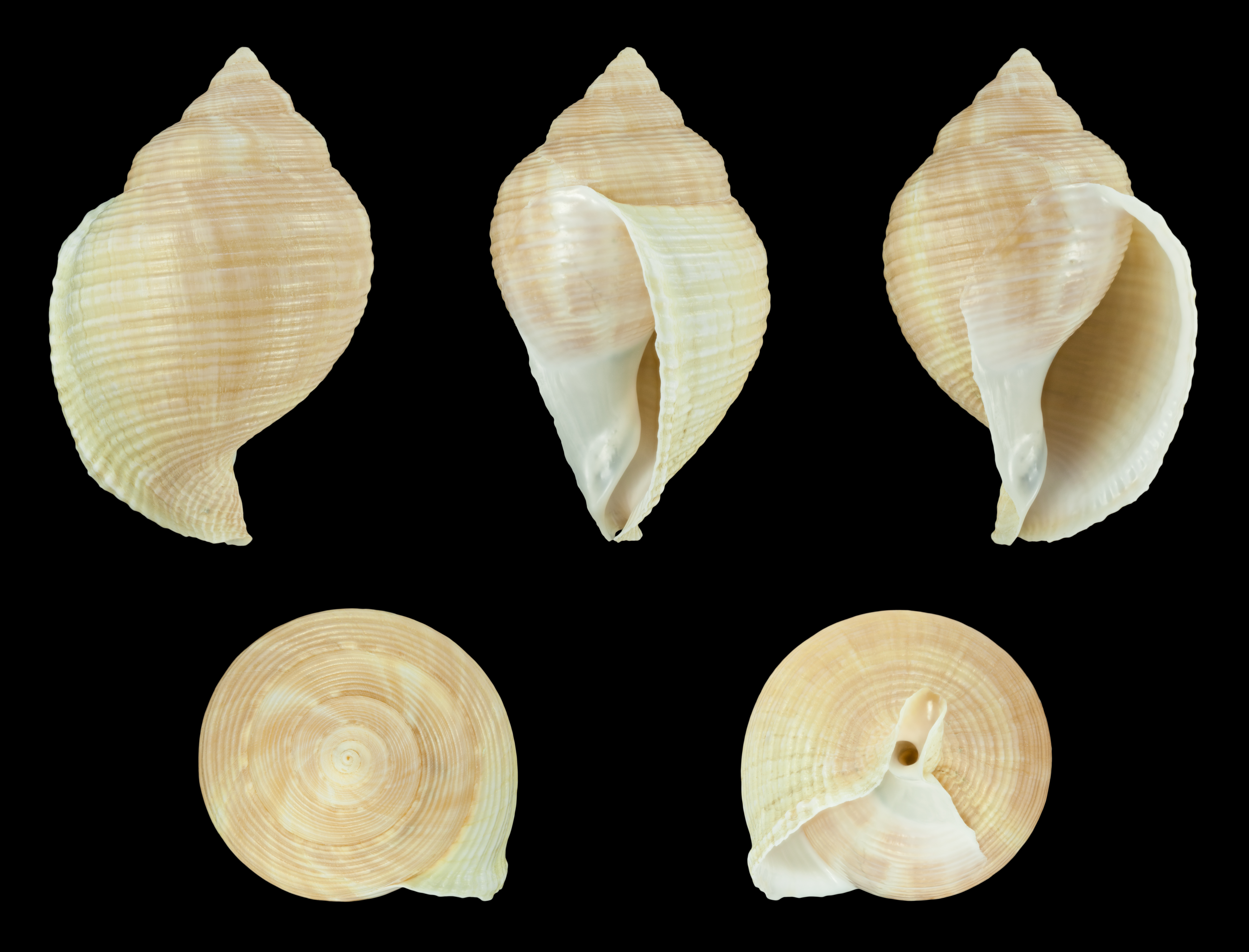
var. adriatica

The fossil record of this species dates back from the Miocene to the Quaternary (age range: 23.03 to 0.781 million years ago). These fossils have been found in India, Spain and Italy.

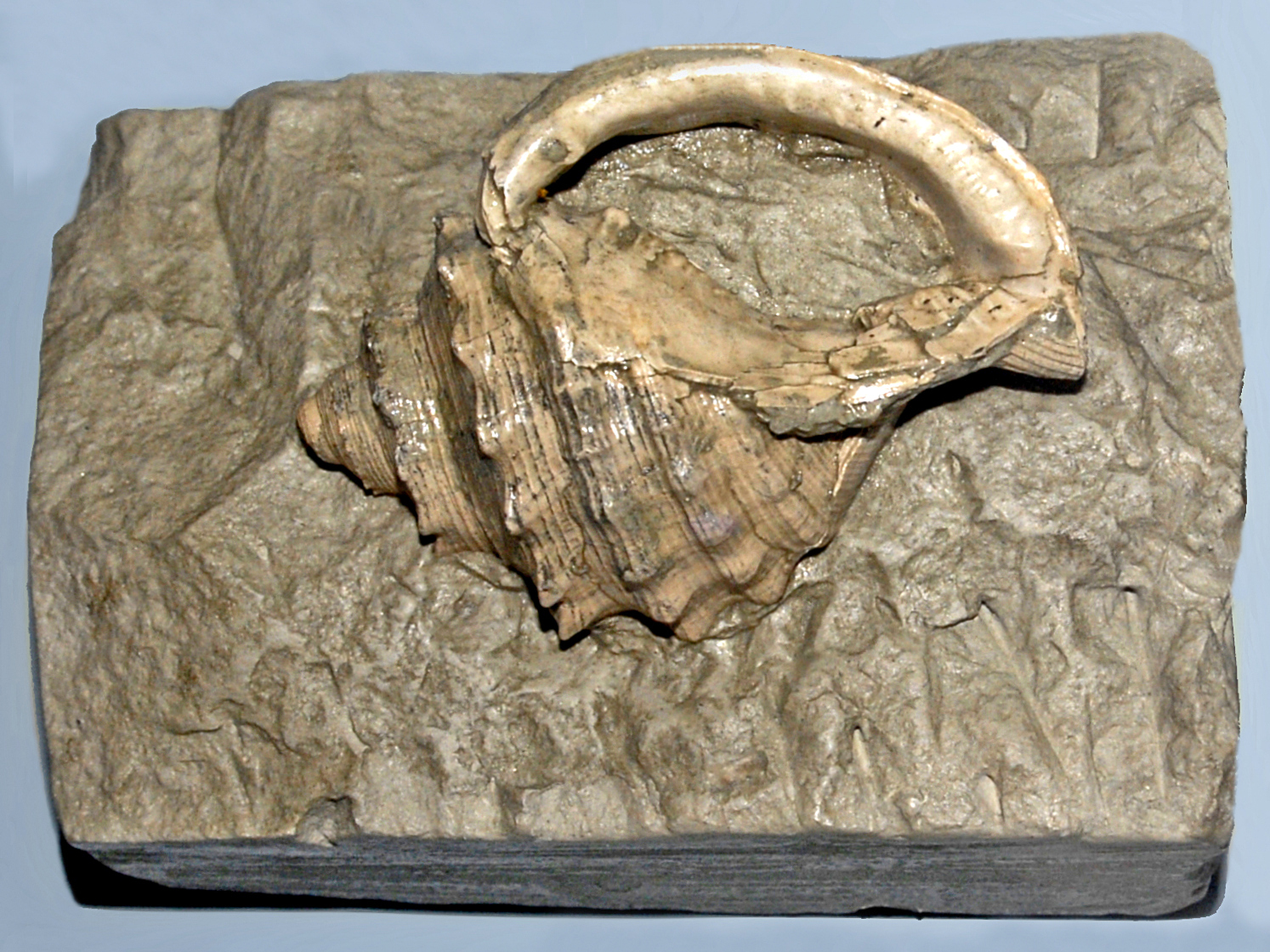
Fossil shell of Galeodea echinophora

== Description ==
The shell of Galeodea echinophora can reach a length of 50–110 millimetres (2.0–4.3 in). The shell is globular or oval, with a large body whorl. The surface of the shell is yellowish-brown. The aperture is wide, with denticulate lips, a curved siphonal canal and a large columellar edge. Tubercles are quite variable, usually not very pronounced and may be entirely absent. These mollusks are carnivorous and eat mostly echinoderms, especially Echinocardium cordatum.

== Distribution and habitat ==
This species can be found in the Eastern Mediterranean Sea and in the North Atlantic Ocean, mainly in Western Africa. It lives on sandy and muddy bottoms over 10 m in depth.
