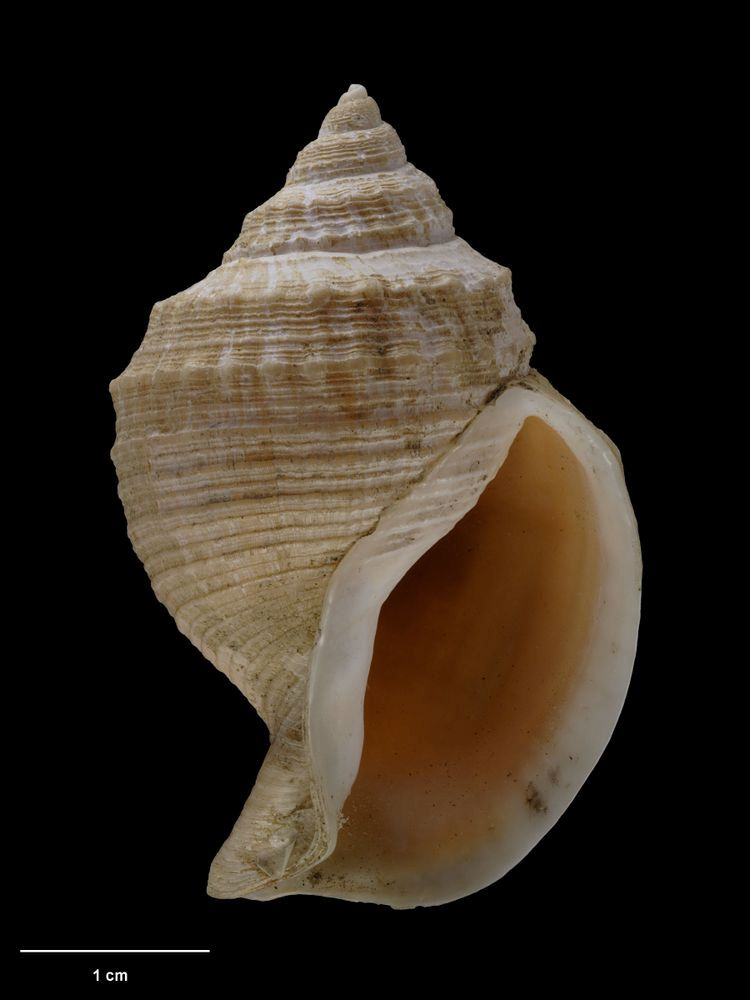

Scientific classification
- Kingdom: Animalia
- Phylum: Mollusca
- Class: Gastropoda
- Subclass: Caenogastropoda
- Order: Littorinimorpha
- Family: Cassidae
- Genus: Galeodea
- Species: G. triganceae

Binomial name
- Galeodea triganceae Dell, 1953

= Galeodea triganceae =

Species of gastropod

Galeodea triganceae is a species of large sea snail, a marine gastropod mollusc in the family Cassidae, the helmet snails.

== Shell description ==
The maximum shell height is 48 mm, and maximum width 31 mm.

== Distribution ==
This species is endemic to New Zealand including the Chatham Islands.

=== Habitat ===
This helmet shell is found at depths of between 90 and 600 m.
