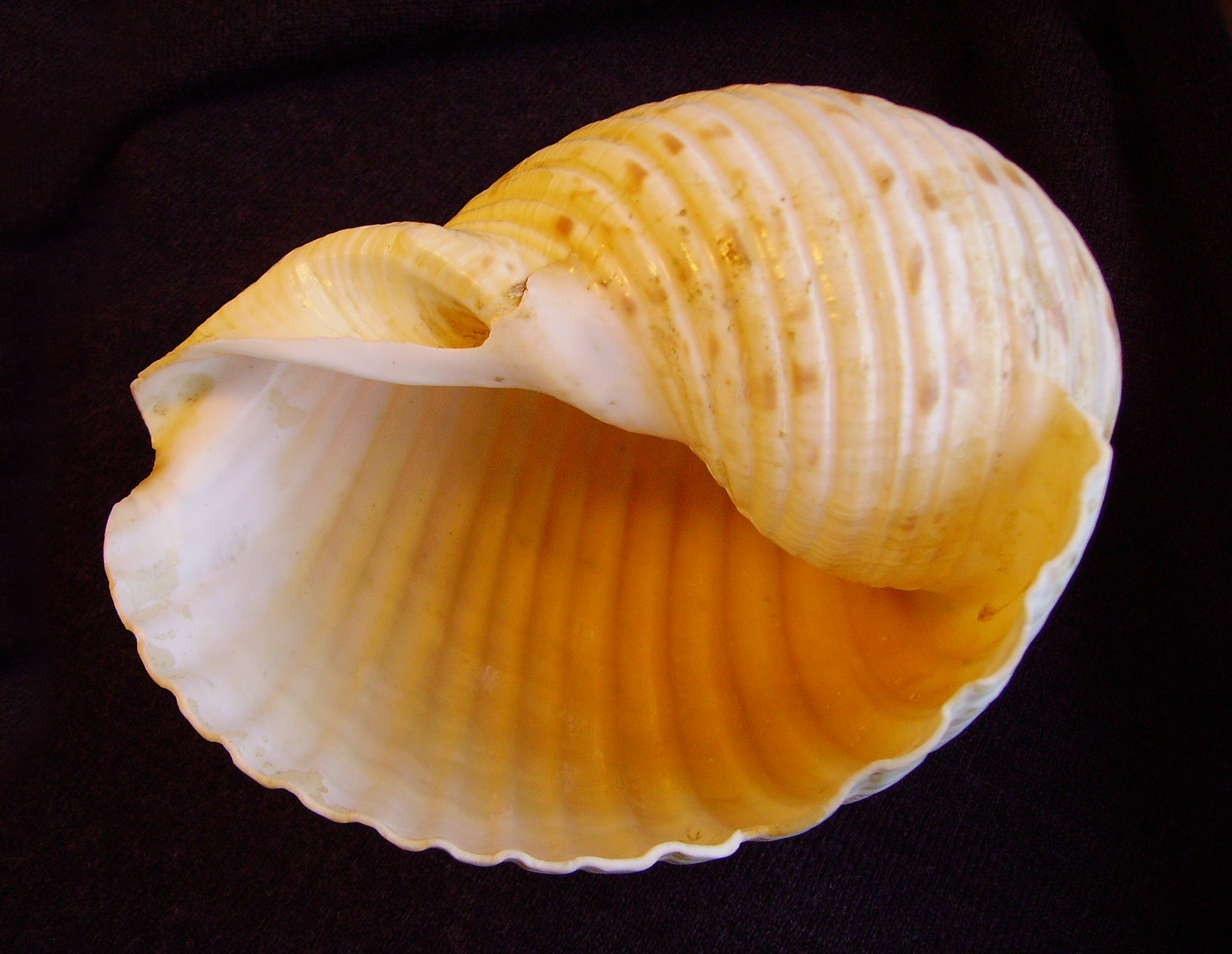
- A shell of Tonna tankervillii (Hanley, 1860)

Scientific classification
- Kingdom: Animalia
- Phylum: Mollusca
- Class: Gastropoda
- Subclass: Caenogastropoda
- Order: Littorinimorpha
- Superfamily: Tonnoidea
- Family: Tonnidae; Suter, 1913 (1825)

Genera
- See text

Synonyms
- Doliidae Latreille, 1825; Galeodoliidae Sacco, 1891; Macgillivrayiidae H. Adams & A. Adams, 1854

= Tonnidae =

Family of gastropods

The Tonnidae are a family of medium-sized to very large sea snails, known as the tun shells. These are marine gastropod molluscs in the clade Littorinimorpha. The name tun refers to the snails' shell shape, which resembles wine casks known as "tuns". While thin, the shells are also strong and lack opercula. They are found in all tropical seas, where they inhabit sandy areas. During the day, they bury themselves in the substrate, emerging at night to feed on echinoderms (especially sea cucumbers), crustaceans, and bivalves. Some larger species also capture fish, using their expandable probosces to swallow them whole. Females lay rows of eggs that become free-swimming larvae for several months before settling to the bottom.

== Taxonomy ==
In 2005, these subfamilies were recognized in the taxonomy of Bouchet & Rocroi:

- Cassinae Latreille, 1825
- Oocorythinae P. Fischer, 1885
- Phaliinae Beu, 1981
- Tonninae Suter, 1913

Bouchet & Rocroi (2005) listed Cassidae as a synonym of Tonnidae Suter, 1913 (1825), following Riedel (1995) in this. However, later Beu (2008: 272) separated the two families. This is in agreement with the action of Thiele (1925) who placed Tonnidae and Cassidae under "Tonnacea", therefore acting as first reviser under ICZN article 24. In this respect, the World Register of Marine Species follows the opinion of Beu.

== Genera ==
Genera and species within the family Tonnidae include:

The subfamily Cassinae has been raised to the rank of family Cassidae

- Eudolium Dall, 1889
- Malea Vallenciennes, 1832
- Tonna Brunnich, 1771

Genera brought into synonymy

- Cadium Link, 1807 : synonym of Tonna Brunnich, 1771
- Cadus Röding, 1798 : synonym of Tonna Brunnich, 1771
- Cassidaria Link, 1807 : synonym of Eudolium Dall, 1889
- Doliopsis di Monterosato, 1872 (non Vogt, 1852; non Conrad, 1865) : synonym of Eudolium Dall, 1889
- Foratidolium Rovereto, 1899: synonym of Tonna Brünnich, 1771
- Macgillivrayia Forbes, 1852 : synonym of Tonna Brünnich, 1771
- Dolium Lamarck, 1801: synonym of Tonna Brunnich, 1771
- Parvitonna Iredale, 1931: synonym of Tonna Brunnich, 1771
- Perdix Montfort, 1810: synonym of Tonna Brunnich, 1771
- Quimalea Iredale, 1929: synonym of Malea Valenciennes, 1832
